= 1914 Connecticut Attorney General election =

- November 3, 1914

Nominee	George E. Hinman	John F. McDonough
Party	Republican	Democratic
Popular vote	90,273	72,709
Percentage	55.4%	44.6%
- Hinman: 50–60% 60–70% 70–80% 80–90% McDonough: 50–60% 60–70%
Attorney General before election
John H. Light
Republican
Elected Attorney General
George E. Hinman
Republican

The 1914 Connecticut Attorney General election was held on November 3, 1914, in order to elect the Attorney General of Connecticut. Republican nominee George E. Hinman defeated Democratic nominee and incumbent member of the Connecticut State Senate John F. McDonough.

== General election ==
On election day, November 3, 1914, Republican nominee George E. Hinman won the election by a margin of 17,564 votes against his opponent Democratic nominee John F. McDonough, thereby retaining Republican control over the office of Attorney General. Hinman was sworn in as the 5th Attorney General of Connecticut in 1915.

=== Results ===
Connecticut Attorney General election, 1914
Party	Candidate	Votes	%
Republican	George E. Hinman	90,273	55.39%
Democratic	John F. McDonough	72,709	44.61%
Total votes		162,982	100.00%
Republican hold			
