= 1910 Connecticut Attorney General election =

- November 8, 1910
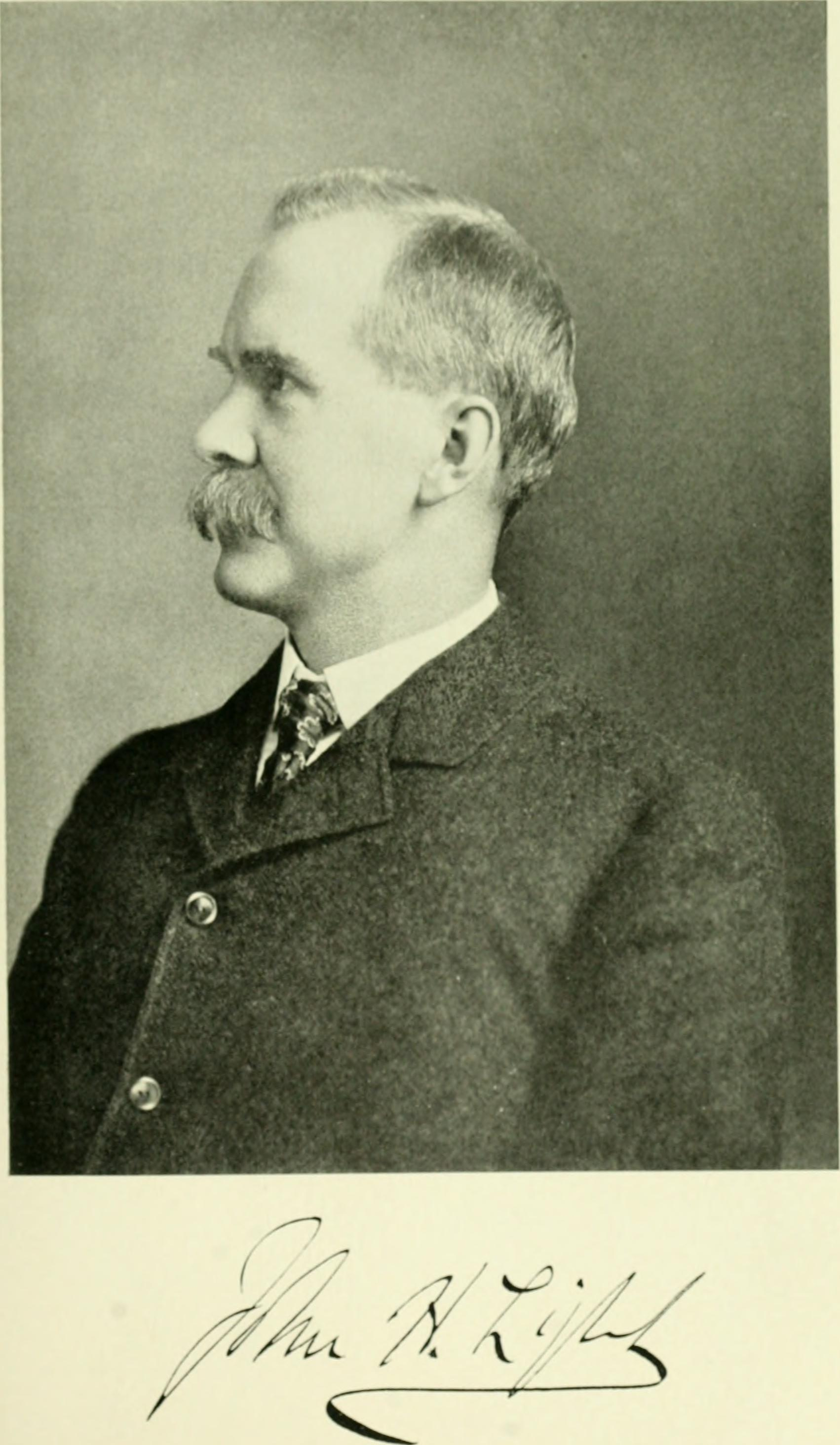

Nominee	John H. Light	Talcott H. Russell
Party	Republican	Democratic
Popular vote	79,700	73,303
Percentage	52.1%	47.9%
- Light: 50–60% 60–70% 70–80% 80–90% Russell: 50–60% 60–70% Tie: 50%
Attorney General before election
John H. Light (Acting)
Republican
Elected Attorney General
John H. Light
Republican

The 1910 Connecticut Attorney General election was held on November 8, 1910, in order to elect the Attorney General of Connecticut. Republican nominee and incumbent acting Attorney General John H. Light defeated Democratic nominee Talcott H. Russell.

== General election ==
On election day, November 8, 1910, Republican nominee John H. Light won the election by a margin of 6,397 votes against his opponent Democratic nominee Talcott H. Russell, thereby retaining Republican control over the office of Attorney General. Light was sworn in for his first full term in 1911.

=== Results ===
Connecticut Attorney General election, 1910
Party	Candidate	Votes	%
Republican	John H. Light (incumbent)	79,700	52.09%
Democratic	Talcott H. Russell	73,303	47.91%
Total votes		153,003	100.00%
Republican hold			
