= Mortimer M. Lee =

American politician (1846–1931)

Mortimer Montgomery Lee

18th and 22nd Mayor of South Norwalk, Connecticut
- In office 1901–1902
- Preceded by: Charles G. Bohannan
- Succeeded by: John J. Cavanagh
- In office 1894–1896
- Preceded by: George Lockwood
- Succeeded by: Charles G. Bohannan

Member of the Connecticut House of Representatives from Norwalk
- In office 1905–1907
- Preceded by: Wallace Dann, Jeremiah Donovan
- Succeeded by: William Low, Frederick Quintard

Personal details
- Born: May 28, 1846 Farmington, Pennsylvania, U.S.
- Party: Republican
- Spouse: Julia Clarissa Adams (m. June 24, 1885)
- Children: Two sons and a daughter: Guy E., Marion M. and Robert M.

Mortimer Montgomery Lee (May 28, 1846 – July 9, 1931) was a two-term Republican mayor of South Norwalk, Connecticut from 1894 to 1896 and from 1901 to 1902. He also served in the Connecticut House of Representatives from 1905 to 1907.

== Early life and family ==
Lee was born in the town of Farmington, Pennsylvania. He was the son of Alonzo and Almira A. Wright Lee. He received his education at the common schools, and also at Troupsburg Academy, Troupsburg, New York, and Union Academy, Knoxville, Pennsylvania. He became a member of the firm of Haughton & Lee of New York City, importer of lace, in 1880. He was vice-president of the Industrial Savings and Loan Company of New York.

Preceded by George Lockwood	Mayor of South Norwalk, Connecticut; 1894 – 1896	Succeeded by Charles G. Bohannan
Preceded by Charles G. Bohannan	Mayor of South Norwalk, Connecticut; 1901 – 1902	Succeeded by John J. Cavanagh
Preceded by Wallace Dann; Jeremiah Donovan	Member of the Connecticut House of Representatives from Norwalk; 1905 – 1907	Succeeded by William Low; Frederick Quintard
