= 1918 Connecticut Attorney General election =

- November 5, 1918

Nominee	Frank E. Healy	Harrison Hewitt
Party	Republican	Democratic
Popular vote	83,953	77,004
Percentage	52.2%	47.8%
- Healy: 50–60% 60–70% 70–80% 80–90% Hewitt: 50–60% 60–70% 70–80% Tie: 50%
Attorney General before election
George E. Hinman
Republican
Elected Attorney General
Frank E. Healy
Republican

The 1918 Connecticut Attorney General election was held on November 5, 1918, in order to elect the Attorney General of Connecticut. Republican nominee and incumbent member of the Connecticut House of Representatives Frank E. Healy defeated Democratic nominee Harrison Hewitt.

== General election ==
On election day, November 5, 1918, Republican nominee Frank E. Healy won the election by a margin of 6,949 votes against his opponent Democratic nominee Harrison Hewitt, thereby retaining Republican control over the office of Attorney General. Healy was sworn in as the 6th Attorney General of Connecticut in 1919.

=== Results ===
Connecticut Attorney General election, 1918
Party	Candidate	Votes	%
Republican	Frank E. Healy	83,953	52.16%
Democratic	Harrison Hewitt	77,004	47.84%
Total votes		160,957	100.00%
Republican hold			
