= Jesse Milton Coburn =

American physician

20th Mayor of South Norwalk, Connecticut
- In office 1897–1898
- Preceded by: Charles G. Bohannan
- Succeeded by: Charles G. Bohannan

Personal details
- Born: March 27, 1853 Pittsfield, New Hampshire
- Died: August 13, 1923 (aged 70) Bridgeport Hospital; Bridgeport, Connecticut
- Resting place: Mountain Grove Cemetery, Bridgeport
- Party: Prohibitionist; Republican
- Spouse(s): Abbie M. Cutler (m. August 4th, 1879)
- Children: two sons, Harrie Cutler Coburn (b. 1883. d. 1948), Aaron Cutler Coburn (b. 1885)
- Education: Pembroke Academy; Hahnemann Medical College; Boston University (M.D., 1874)
- Occupation: Physician

Jesse Milton Coburn (1853–1923) was a one-term Republican mayor of South Norwalk, Connecticut, from 1897 to 1898.

== Early life and family ==
Coburn was born and raised in Pittsfield, New Hampshire. He was the son of clergyman Jesse Milton Coburn and Almira Morse Coburn, who died at his birth. As a youth, he worked finishing leather in a currying shop. He attended high school in Manchester, New Hampshire, and at the Pembroke Academy in Pembroke, New Hampshire. He then worked in a doctor's office, and later studied at the Hahnemann Medical College in Philadelphia. He earned his medical degree at the Medical School of Boston University, where he was graduated in 1874.

He opened his practice in Brooklyn, Connecticut. He was soon made surgeon to the Boston and Albany Railroad.

In 1893 he moved to South Norwalk and became the surgeon for the New York, New Haven and Hartford Railroad, as well as city physician of South Norwalk.

== Political career ==
In 1899, he was elected mayor of South Norwalk as a Republican.

== Associations ==
- Member, Independent Order of Odd Fellows
- Fleet Surgeon, Norwalk Yacht Club
- Chairman, Worship Committee, Congregational Church

Preceded by Charles G. Bohannan	Mayor of South Norwalk, Connecticut; 1897–-1898	Succeeded by Charles G. Bohannan
