= Charles G. Bohannan =

American physician

19th and 21st Mayor of South Norwalk, Connecticut
- In office 1897–1898
- Preceded by: Mortimer M. Lee
- Succeeded by: J. Milton Coburn
- In office 1899–1901
- Preceded by: J. Milton Coburn
- Succeeded by: Mortimer M. Lee

Personal details
- Born: October 7, 1852 Westville, Virginia, US
- Died: April 19, 1934 (aged 81)
- Resting place: Norwalk, Connecticut, US
- Party: Democratic
- Education: University of the City of New York (1878, medicine)
- Occupation: physician

Charles Gordon Bohannan (1852–1934) was a two-term Democratic mayor of South Norwalk, Connecticut from 1897 to 1898 and from 1899 to 1901.

== Early life and family ==
Dr. Charles G. Bohannan was born in Westville, Virginia, October 7, 1852. He was the son of John G. Bohannan (1827–1897) and Laura Lee Daniel (died 1886). His father was a planter and a physician in Mathews County, Virginia, whose first wife was Ann Billups, the daughter of Major George Billups. They had seven children, but Ann died in 1841. When Virginia seceded, Bohannan's father entered the ranks of the Confederate Army, in which he remained for three years and became a colonel. In 1849, Bohannan's father married his mother, a daughter of William Daniell. They also had seven children together. His father served as a State Representative from Matthews County, Virginia from 1885 to 1886.

In 1875, Bohannan entered the Medical Department of the University of the City of New York, graduating in 1878. After completing his course in medicine he returned to Virginia, where he practiced his profession for a year and a half. He was then appointed house surgeon at the Orthopedic Hospital at New York City, spending six months as in-door and six months as out-door surgeon.

In 1881, Bohannan came to South Norwalk. He became active in the work of the local Democratic Party.

He served as school visitor, a member of the South Norwalk Common Council, and in 1897, was elected mayor of South Norwalk.

== Associations ==
- Member, Knights Templar
- Member, Mystic Shrine, of the I. O. O. F
- Member, Mystic Chain
- Member, Knights of Pythias
- Member, American Mechanics

Preceded by J. Milton Coburn	Mayor of South Norwalk, Connecticut; 1899–1901	Succeeded by Mortimer M. Lee
Preceded by Mortimer M. Lee	Mayor of South Norwalk, Connecticut; 1897–1898	Succeeded by J. Milton Coburn
