= Jeremiah Donovan =

American politician (1857–1935)

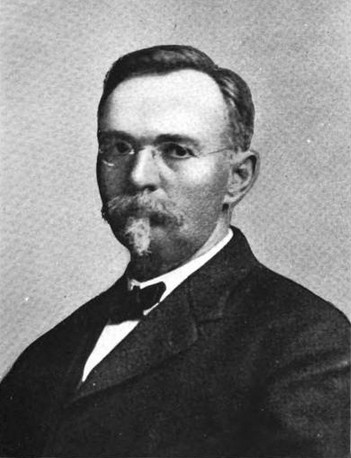

17th Mayor of Norwalk, Connecticut
- In office 1917–1921
- Preceded by: Carl Harstrom
- Succeeded by: Calvin Barton

Member of the United States House of Representatives from Connecticut's 4th District
- In office March 4, 1913 – March 3, 1915
- Preceded by: Ebenezer J. Hill
- Succeeded by: Ebenezer J. Hill

Member of the Connecticut Senate from the 26th District
- In office 1905–1909
- Preceded by: District Established
- Succeeded by: Joseph F. Silliman
- In office 1911–1913
- Preceded by: Joseph F. Silliman
- Succeeded by: Hanford Weed

Member of the Connecticut House of Representatives
- In office 1903–1904 Serving with Wallace Dann
- Preceded by: Elbert Adams, John H. Light
- Succeeded by: Mortimer M. Lee

Personal details
- Born: October 18, 1857 Ridgefield, Connecticut, US
- Died: April 22, 1935 (aged 77) Norwalk, Connecticut, US
- Resting place: St John's Cemetery; Norwalk, Connecticut, US
- Party: Democratic
- Education: Ridgefield Academy
- Occupation: Tavern owner

Jeremiah Donovan (October 18, 1857 – April 22, 1935) was a saloon owner and Democratic politician in Norwalk, Connecticut. He was a member of the Connecticut House of Representatives in 1903 and 1904. He served in the Connecticut Senate representing the 26th District from 1905 to 1909, and from 1911 to 1913. He served in the United States House of Representatives from Connecticut's 4th congressional district from 1913 to 1915. He was the 17th mayor of the city of Norwalk, Connecticut from 1917 to 1921.

== Early life ==
He was born in Ridgefield, Connecticut where he attended the public schools and was graduated from Ridgefield Academy. He moved to South Norwalk in 1870. He engaged in the retail liquor business until 1898 when he retired. His saloon at the corner of Washington and Water streets is still in business, now named Donovan's and Mackenzie's.

== Political career ==
Donovan was a member of the Norwalk city council and also served as deputy sheriff. Donovan was a delegate to the Democratic National Convention from 1896 to 1916. He was a member of the Connecticut House of Representatives in 1903 and 1904 and served in the Connecticut Senate 1905-1909. He was elected to the Sixty-third Congress from March 4, 1913 to March 3, 1915, but was an unsuccessful candidate for reelection in 1914 to the Sixty-fourth Congress. He was the mayor of the city of Norwalk, Connecticut 1917-1921. He retired before dying in Norwalk, Connecticut in 1935. He was buried at St. John's Cemetery.

Preceded by Elbert Adams; John H. Light	Member of the Connecticut House of Representatives from Norwalk; 1903 – 1904; With: Wallace Dann	Succeeded by Mortimer M. Lee
Preceded by District Established	Member of the Connecticut Senate from the 26th District; 1905 – 1909	Succeeded by Joseph F. Silliman
Preceded by Joseph F. Silliman	Member of the Connecticut Senate from the 26th District; 1911 – 1913	Succeeded by Hanford Weed
U.S. House of Representatives
Preceded by Ebenezer J. Hill	Member of the U.S. House of Representatives from Connecticut's 4th congressional district March 4, 1913–March 3, 1915	Succeeded by Ebenezer J. Hill
Preceded by Carl Harstrom	Mayor of Norwalk, Connecticut; 1917–1921	Succeeded by Calvin Barton
