= John Cavanagh (hatter) =

American hatter (1864–1957)

John J. Cavanagh

12th Mayor of Norwalk, Connecticut
- In office 1908–1909
- Preceded by: Charles A. Scofield
- Succeeded by: Leeman M. Brundage

23rd Mayor of South Norwalk, Connecticut
- In office 1902–1903
- Preceded by: Mortimer M. Lee
- Succeeded by: Charles E. Dow

Personal details
- Born: January 16, 1864
- Died: January 24, 1957 (aged 93) Old Saugatuck Road, Norwalk, Connecticut
- Party: Democratic
- Children: J. Garvan Cavanagh Lawrence Cavanagh Carroll Cavanagh
- Occupation: Hatter

John J. Cavanagh (January 16, 1864 – January 24, 1957) was an American gentleman's hatter based in New York City. He was a Democratic mayor of South Norwalk and of Norwalk, Connecticut. He was a leader in both styling and manufacturing of hats for fifty years.

== Political career ==
In 1902, Cavanagh was elected mayor of South Norwalk and in 1908, he was elected mayor of Norwalk. He is the only person to have served as mayors of both cities prior to their consolidation in 1913.

He was very active in Democratic Party politics, and in 1925 was considered for the candidacy for governor of Connecticut. However, he was unwilling, due to his business responsibilities. He was a founder of the Norwalk Hospital, and was a member of its board of trustees for 20 years.

He was a founder of the Shorehaven Golf Club, a member of the Merritt Parkway Commission, the Norwalk Housing Authority, the Norwalk Kiwanis Club, and the State Prison Board.

== Hat manufacturing business ==
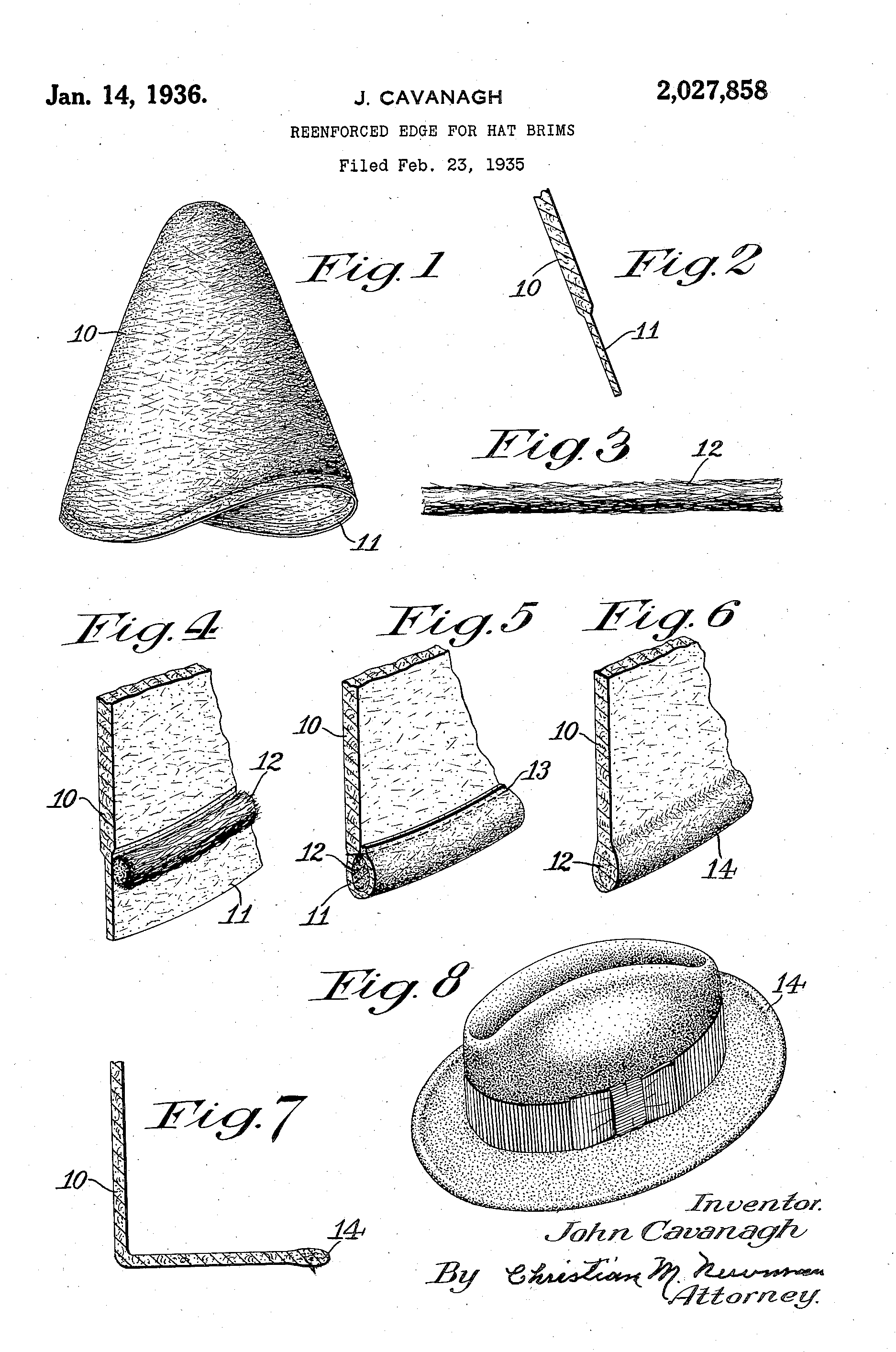
Patent drawing for the Cavanagh Edge, 1935

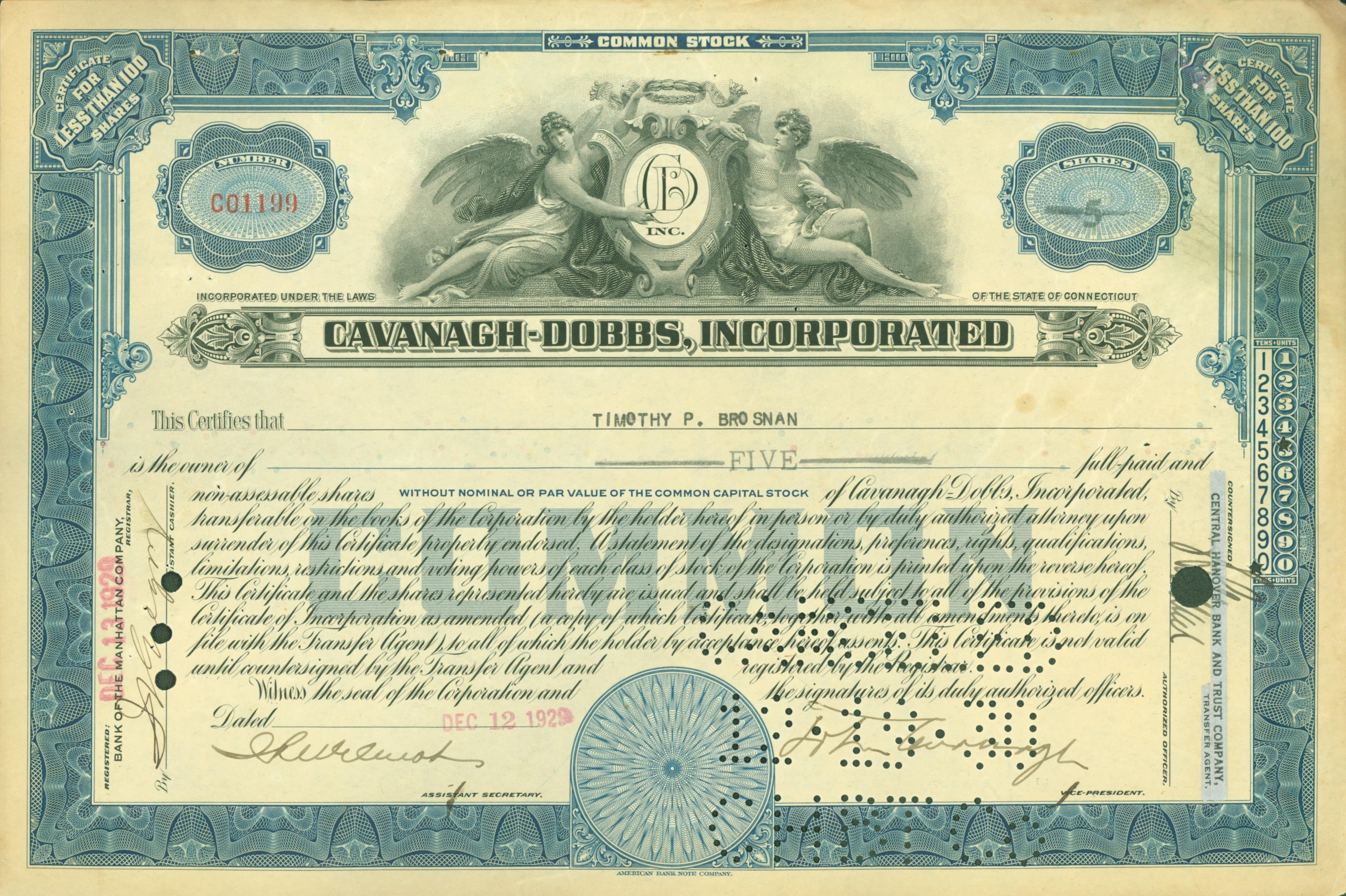
Share of the Cavanagh-Dobbs, Inc., issued 12 December 1929

Cavanagh went to work for William A. Brown hatters of Norwalk at the age of 17. He worked as a sizer, trimmer, finisher, expert cutter, curler, and plant superintendent. In 1880 he began working for Crofut & Knapp, where he was mentored by James H. Knapp. By 1907, Cavanagh was vice-president of Crofut & Knapp, and from 1923 to 1937, he was president of the company.

In 1928 Cavanagh created the company of Cavanagh-Dobbs Inc., which included his own hat label, Cavanagh Hats, and a retail outlet in New York City, John Cavanagh Ltd.

In 1932, he founded the Hat Corporation of America, merging his brands with Knox & Dunlap. In 1934 the Cavanagh Hat Research Corporation was founded to research materials and manufacturing methods to benefit the industry. He gave his name to a method of finishing hat brims known as the Cavanagh Edge. Cavanagh's other innovations included introducing regular, long and wide-oval fitting hats to enable customers to find better-fitting ready-to-wear hats. In 1939 John Cavanagh was awarded a Neiman Marcus Fashion Award in recognition of his services to the American hat industry.

He retired in 1947, though retained an honorary vice-presidency, and died in 1957. His son, J. Garvan Cavanagh, inherited vice presidency of the company, but left in 1961 to become a Roman Catholic priest.

== Cavanagh Hats ==
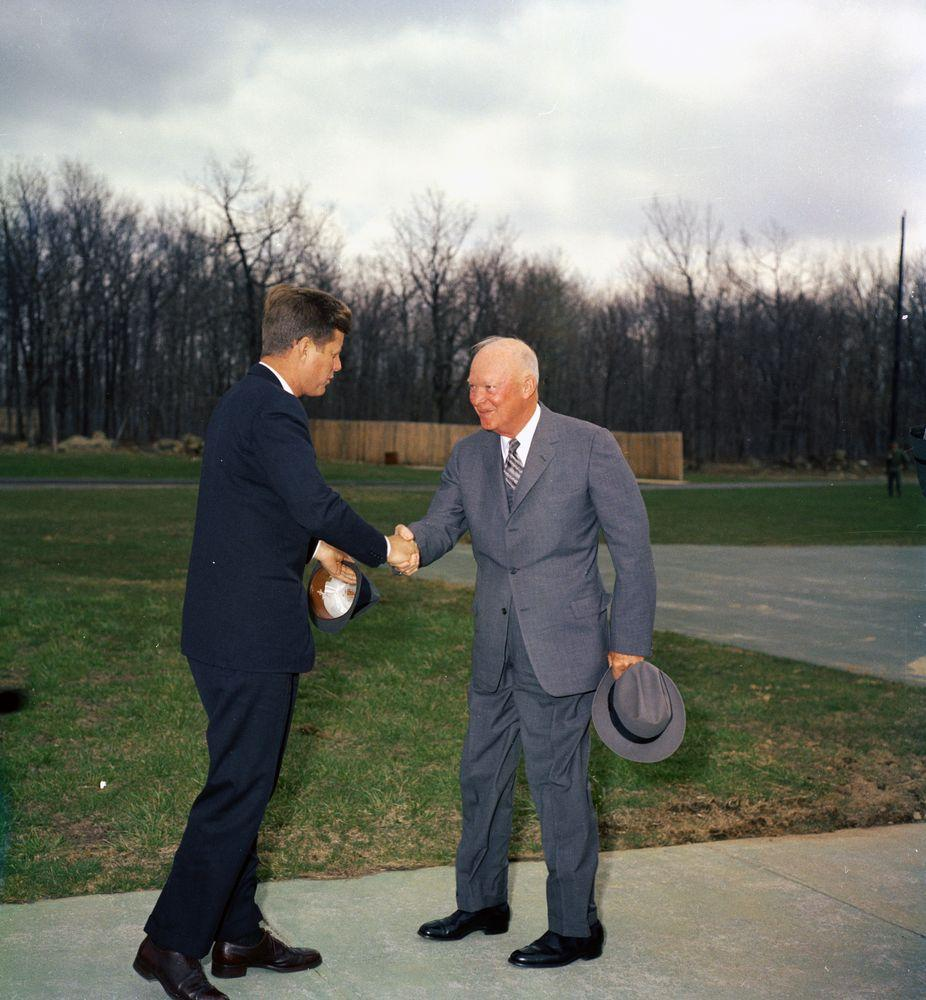
John F. Kennedy meeting with Eisenhower, April 22, 1961

Al Webb (b. February 15, 1920), who joined the company after the Second World War, was by 1961 Vice President of Sales for the Hat Corporation of America. Like J. Garvan Cavanagh, he was a close friend of John F. Kennedy, whose dislike of wearing hats had led to a downturn in hat sales. At a 1961 PT reunion in Washington, DC, Webb accused his friend of having ruined the American hat industry. In response, Kennedy began carrying a hat with the Cavanagh Hats label clearly visible. The first incidence of this was when Kennedy met with Dwight D. Eisenhower on April 22, 1961, at Camp David.

== Awards ==
- Citizen's Award, Jewish War Veterans, 1945
- Cross of the Order of the Knights of Malta

Preceded by Charles A. Scofield	Mayor of Norwalk, Connecticut; 1908–1909	Succeeded by Leeman M. Brundage
Preceded by Mortimer M. Lee	Mayor of South Norwalk, Connecticut; 1902–1903	Succeeded by Charles E. Dow
