= Calvin Barton =

American mayor

Calvin L. Barton

18th Mayor of Norwalk, Connecticut
- In office 1921–1923
- Preceded by: Jeremiah Donovan
- Succeeded by: Thomas Robins

Personal details
- Born: May 16, 1874
- Died: May 10, 1939 (aged 64)
- Party: Republican
- Spouse: Nina Whitlock Bagley Barton (died 1977) (m. September 19, 1908)
- Children: Bradford
- Education: Cornell University (1899)
- Occupation: civil engineer

Calvin Lewis Barton (1874 – May 10, 1939) was a one-term Republican mayor of Norwalk, Connecticut. He was the son of Lewis Barton and Caroline C. Bebee. He graduated from Cornell University in 1899 in civil engineering. He married Nina Bagley on September 19, 1908

He was president of C. L. Barton, engineers, of South Norwalk. Previously he had been an engineer with various companies, including the American Bridge Company, the Phoenix Construction Company, and the McHarg-Boston Company.

Preceded by Jeremiah Donovan	Mayor of Norwalk, Connecticut; 1921–1923	Succeeded by Thomas Robins
