= Beth Israel Synagogue (Norwalk, Connecticut) =

Religious building in Norwalk, Connecticut, United States

Beth Israel Synagogue (former); now Canaan Institutional Baptist Church
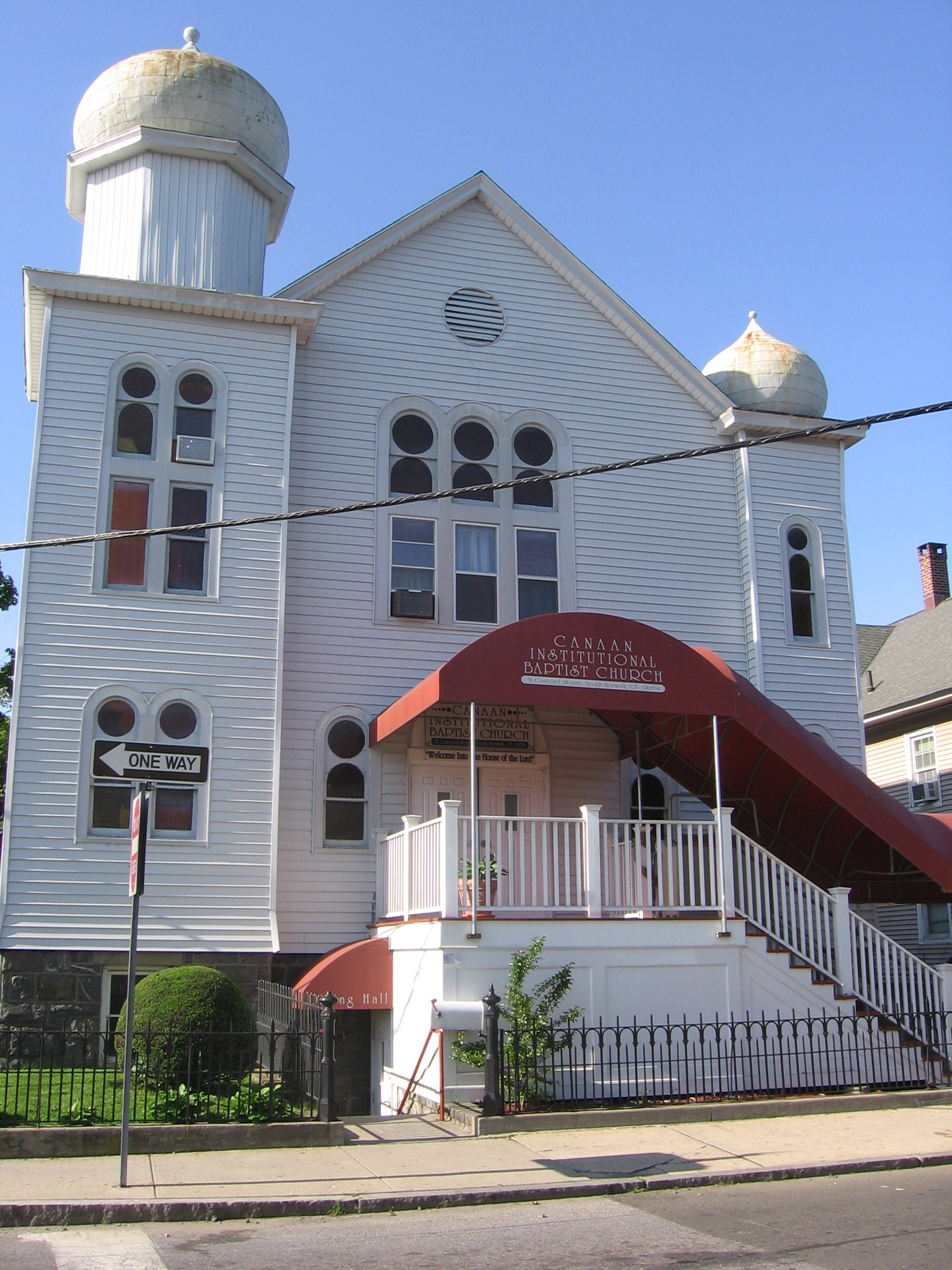
- Front entrance, in 2012

- Location in Connecticut

Religion
- Affiliation: Orthodox Judaism (former) (1906 – 1972); Baptism (since 1972)
- Ecclesiastical or organizational status: Synagogue (1906 – 1972); Church (since 1972)

Location
- Location: 31 Concord Street, Norwalk, Connecticut
- Country: United States
- Interactive map of: Beth Israel Synagogue (former); now Canaan Institutional Baptist Church
- Coordinates: 41°5′35″N 73°25′9″W

Architecture
- Type: Synagogue
- Style: Late 19th and 20th Century Revivals; Moorish Revival
- Completed: 1906
- Beth Israel Synagogue / Canaan Institutional Baptist Church
- U.S. National Register of Historic Places
- NRHP reference No.: 91001684
- Added to NRHP: November 29, 1991

Beth Israel Synagogue was an Orthodox synagogue and, since 1972, a Baptist church building located at 31 Concord Street in the South Norwalk section of Norwalk, Connecticut, in the United States.

Built in 1906, the Moorish Revival style building is the only known synagogue building in Connecticut displaying Moorish onion domes, and is an unusual example of an urban wood-frame synagogue. Since 1972, the building has been owned and occupied by the Canaan Institutional Ba'ptist Church. (Beth Israel's original Orthodox congregation is now known as Beth Israel Chabad of Norwalk/Westport and worships in a new building in East Norwalk.) The building was added to the National Register of Historical Places in 1991.

== Architecture and history ==
The former Beth Israel Synagogue building is located in South Norwalk, at the southwest corner of Concord Street and South Main Street. It is a two-story wood-frame structure, with a gabled roof and exterior finished in modern siding. Its main facade, facing Concord Street, is dominated by projecting square towers at each corner, each with an onion dome at its top. The left tower is larger and taller, with an octagonal section rising up above the main roof eave, while the right one is smaller and lacking in the octagonal section. Windows on the facade are in round-arch openings, with transom-like circular windows at the top of the opening, and either round-top or square-top sash windows below.

The building was erected in 1906 for the Orthodox Beth Israel Congregation, which was organized in 1865 by German Jewish immigrants. The building is the only wood-frame synagogue known in the state. Its design was influenced by that of the 1872 Central Synagogue in New York City, which also has onion domes. While the onion domes are an unusual detail, the architecture is otherwise within usual standards for synagogues in Connecticut. The congregation remained here until construction of a new synagogue was finished in 1972. It has been owned by the Canaan Institutional Baptist Church since then.

== See also ==
- National Register of Historic Places listings in Fairfield County, Connecticut
