= South Norwalk Railroad Bridge =

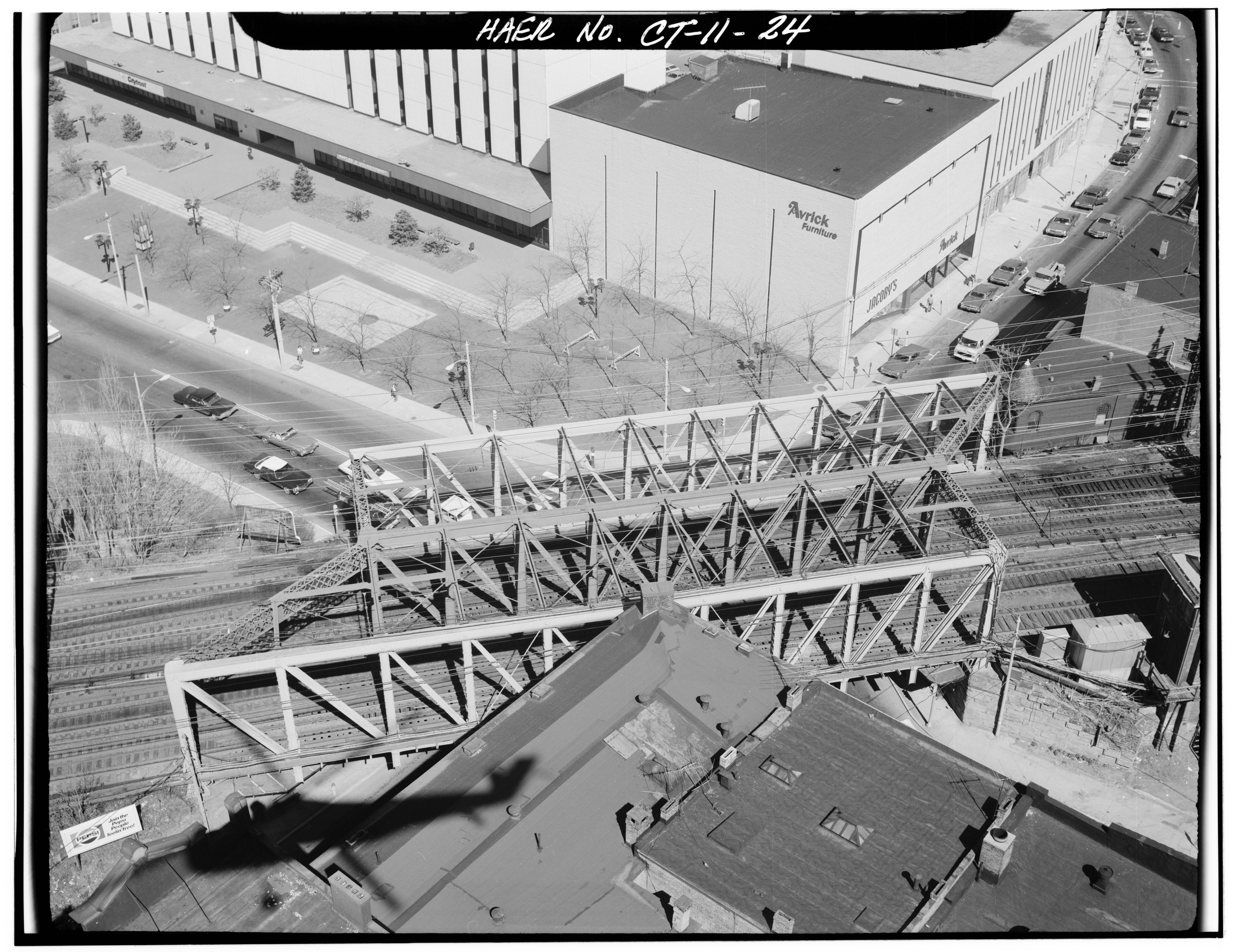
- Coordinates: 41°05′56″N 73°25′08″W
- South Norwalk Railroad Bridge
- U.S. Historic district – Contributing property
- Location within Connecticut Location within the United States
- Location: Main and Washington Streets Norwalk, Connecticut
- Coordinates: 41°05′56″N 73°25′08″W
- Area: 5.5 acres (2.2 ha) (original); 2.5 acres (1.0 ha) (increase I); 3 acres (1.2 ha) (increase II)
- Built: 1895
- Part of: South Main and Washington Streets Historic District (ID77001393, 85003505, and 99000449)
- Added to NRHP: December 16, 1977 (original); November 8, 1985 (increase I); April 15, 1999 (increase II)
- Carries: 4 tracks of New Haven Line

Characteristics
- Design: through Pratt truss
- Clearance below: 3.38 metres (11 ft 1 in)

History
- Constructed by: NY, NH&H RR
- Opened: 1895; 131 years ago

Location
- Interactive map of South Norwalk Railroad Bridge

The South Norwalk Railroad Bridge is an 1895 bridge in Norwalk, Connecticut. It carries the four sets of Metro-North railroad tracks across the busy intersection of Main Street and Washington Street in the South Norwalk section of the city. The bridge is adjacent to the South Norwalk Switch Tower Museum, which showcases the railroad switch tower where tracks were physically switched at the intersection of the Danbury Branch and the New Haven Line.

The bridge is a contributing structure in the South Main and Washington Streets Historic District.

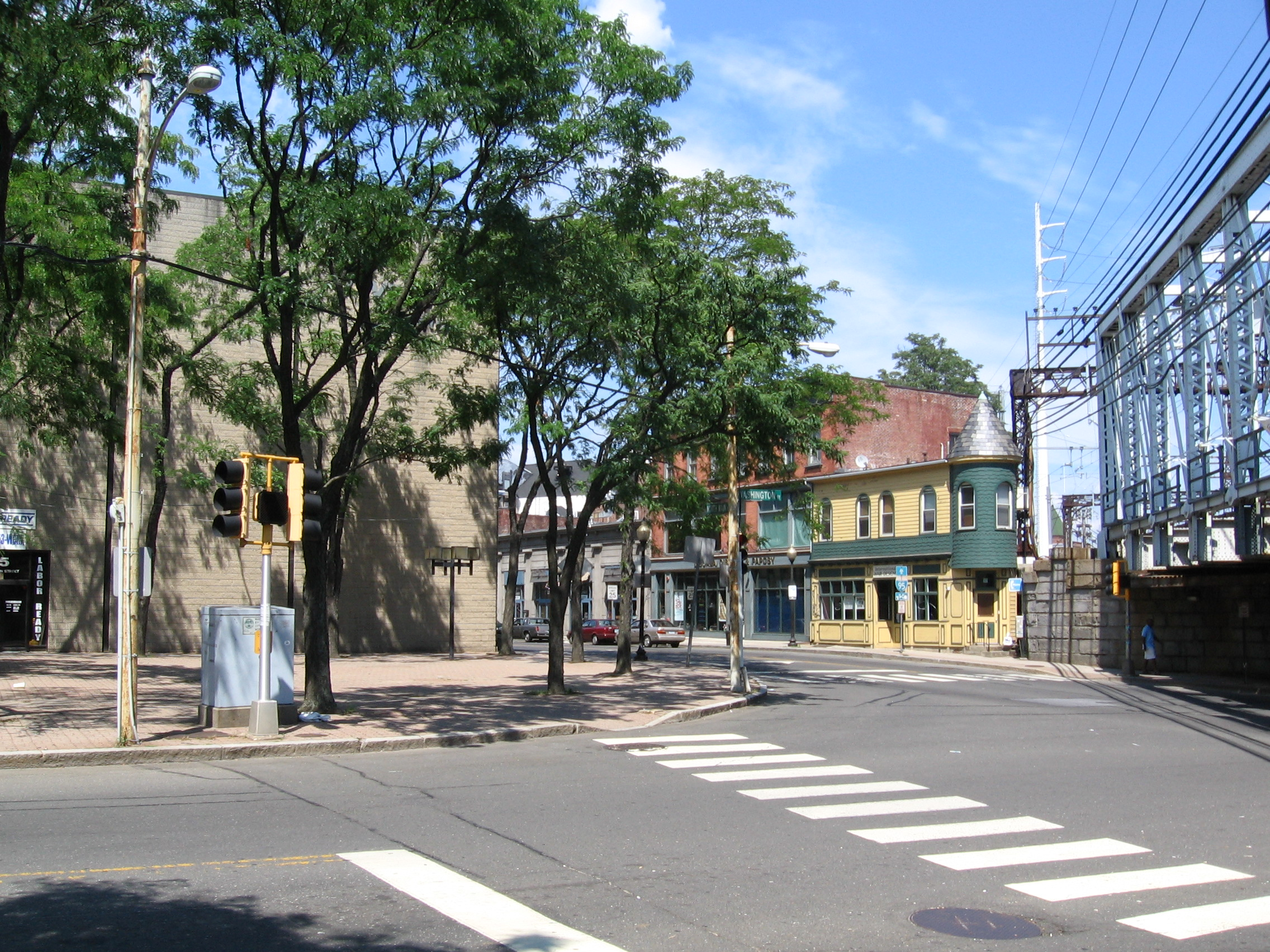
Unusual building adjacent to northeast corner of bridge with partial view of bridge on right, 12 August 2007

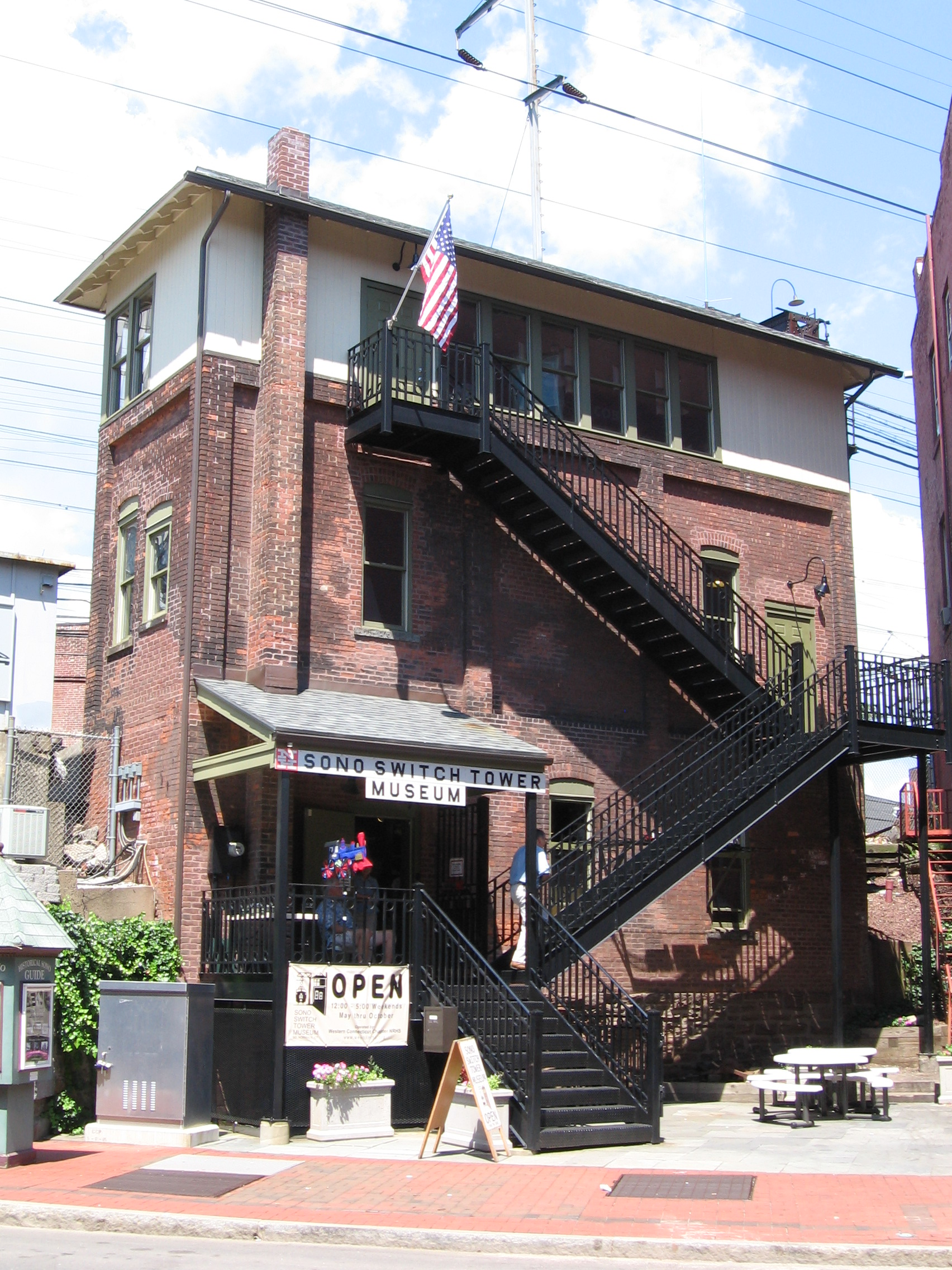
The Switch Tower Museum, 12 August 2007

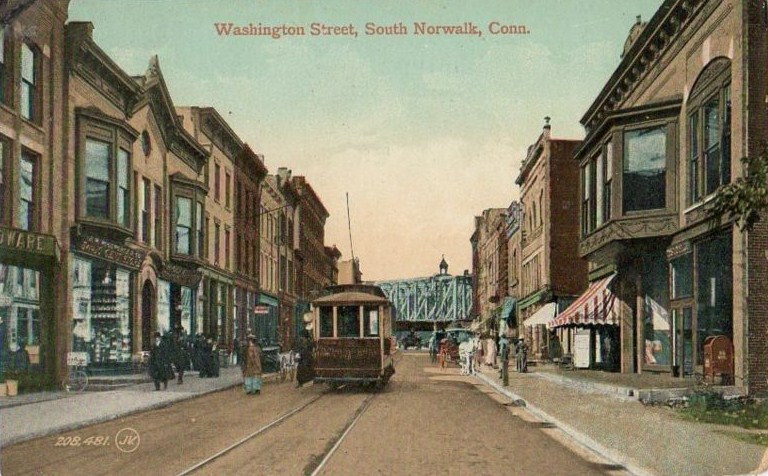
1910 postcard view along Washington Street with the bridge behind the trolley
