= The SoNo Collection =

Shopping mall in Norwalk, Connecticut, U.S.

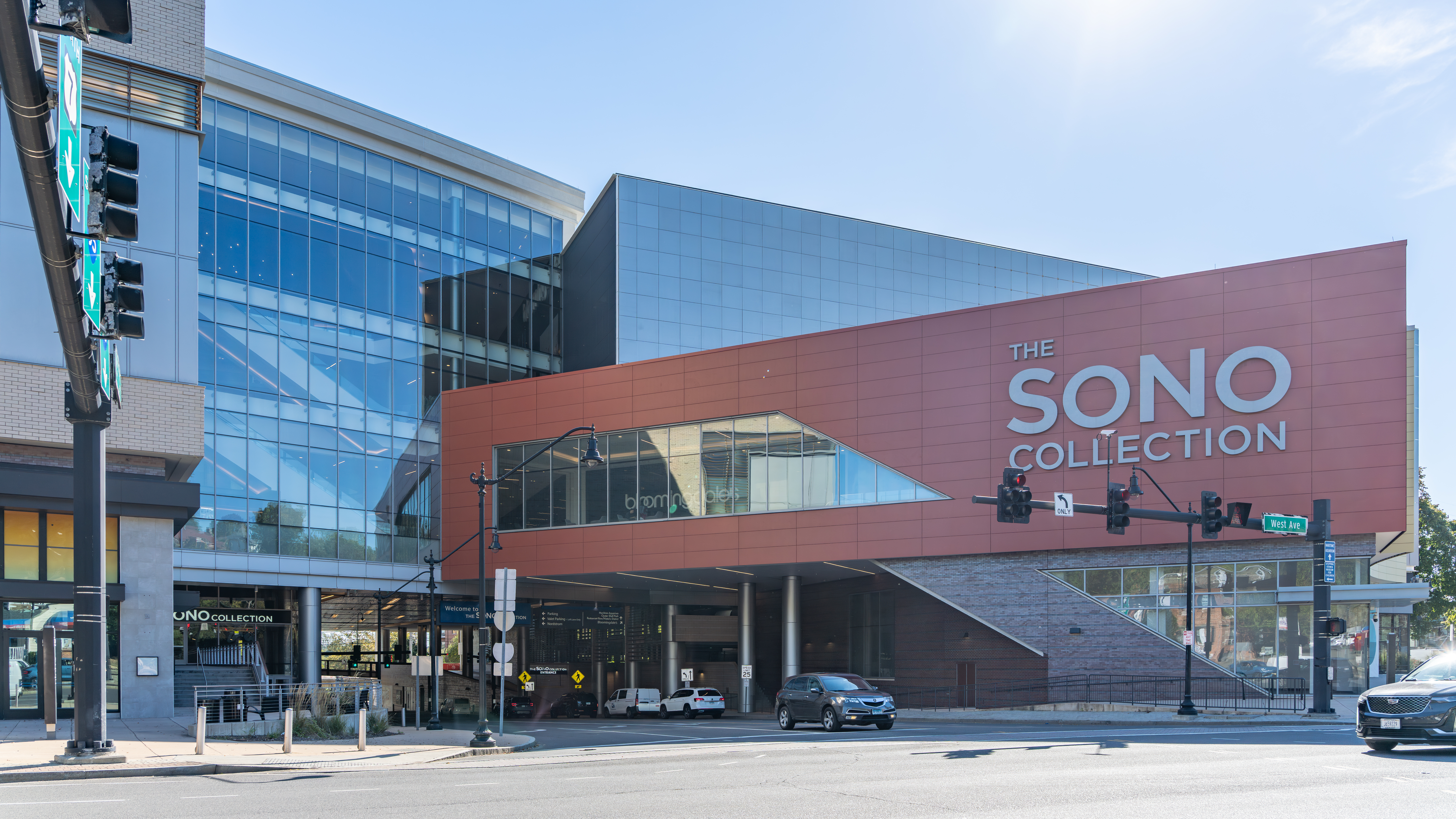
- Exterior view (October 2025)
- Location: Norwalk, Connecticut, United States
- Coordinates: 41.105110°N 73.419332°W
- Address: 100 North Water Street
- Opened: October 11, 2019; 7 years ago
- Developer: GGP Inc. (2017–2018); Brookfield Properties (2018–2019)
- Manager: Centennial Real Estate Management LLC
- Num. of stores: 89
- Num. of anchor tenants: 2
- Floor area: 717,000 sq ft (66,600 m^{2})
- Floors: 3
- Public transit: Norwalk Transit District: 10
- Website: thesonocollection.com

The SoNo Collection is an upscale shopping mall in the South Norwalk neighborhood of Norwalk, Connecticut. It was formerly operated from its opening until 2026 by the mall's developer, GGP, a subsidiary of Brookfield Properties. As of June 2026, it is leased and managed by the Dallas-based Centennial.

The mall opened on October 11, 2019, becoming the fourth mall in Fairfield County. It introduced phased opening approach, incorporating interactive art installations and community gathering spaces. The mall is anchored by southern Connecticut's only Nordstrom and the state’s only Bloomingdale's. It is situated next to Interstate 95 and Route 7.

== History ==
The SoNo Collection was announced in 2017 by mall developer General Growth Properties (GGP), with construction beginning later that year. A ground breaking ceremony was held on August 16, 2017. Following the acquisition of GGP by Brookfield Property Partners in August 2018, Brookfield continued development of the mall. Work on the Bloomingdale's anchor store commenced on October 18, 2018.

On March 14, 2024, it was announced that The Body Shop, located on the first floor, and Michaels Jewelers, on the second floor, would close as part of broader changes—including the shutdown of The Body Shop's U.S. operations. Around that time, Charlotte Russe opened a new store at the mall.

On April 1, 2026, it was reported that the mall was being marketed for sale, according to the broker of the Chicago-based real estate company JLL, and on May 21, the mall faced foreclosure. On June 8, 2026, it was confirmed that Dallas-based Centennial would take over management of the mall from Brookfield and GGP.
