= West End Library =

- U.S. National Register of Historic Places
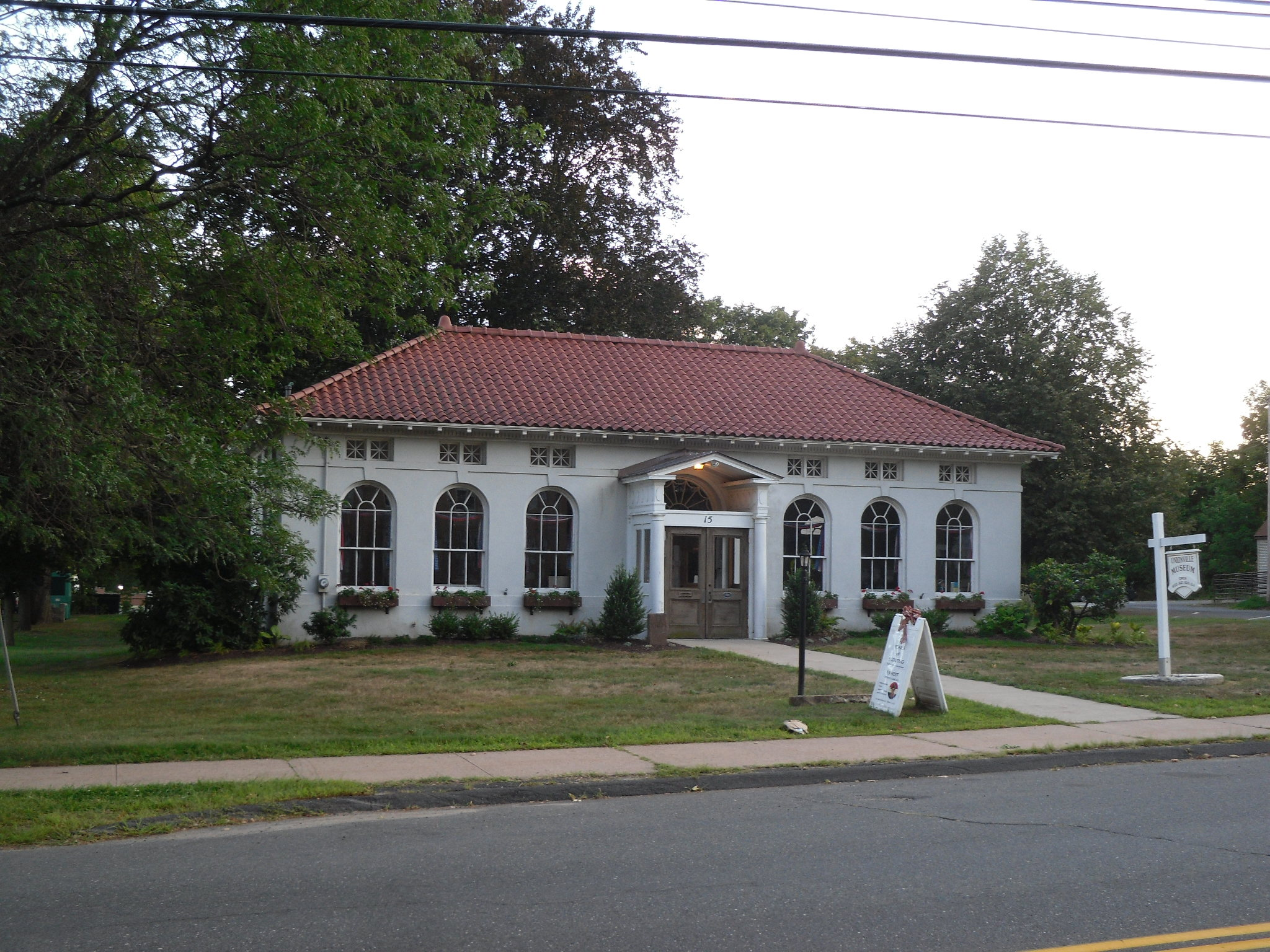

- Location within Connecticut Location within the United States
- Location: 15 School Street, Farmington, Connecticut
- Coordinates: 41°45′29″N 72°53′19″W
- Area: 0.2 acres (0.081 ha)
- Built: 1917
- Architect: Tilton, Edward Lippincott; Jones, Richard Fredrick
- Architectural style: Renaissance
- NRHP reference No.: 00000369
- Added to NRHP: April 25, 2000

The West End Library, now the Unionville Museum, is a historic library and museum building at 15 School Street in the Unionville village of Farmington, Connecticut. The Renaissance style building was designed by New York City architect Edward Tilton, and completed in 1917 with funding from Andrew Carnegie. The building was added to the National Register of Historic Places in 2000.

== Description and history ==
Farmington's former West End Library is located in the center of Unionville village, on the south side of School Street west of Connecticut Route 177. It is a single-story building, with load-bearing brick walls finished in stucco, and a red tile roof. Its main facade is seven bays wide, with a projecting gable-roofed entry portico in the center bay. The other bays have tall round-arch windows, with small rectangular transom-like windows set above, just below the roofline, with diamond grillwork.

The Unionville Library Association was founded in 1902, with its collection occupying a small room in Farmington's town hall, then located nearby this building's site. It grew rapidly in size and usage, and the need for a larger and more permanent home was evident. This building was built in 1917, funded in part by a grant of $8,500 from philanthropist Andrew Carnegie. Designed by Edward Tilton, it is based in simplified and reduced form on the McKim Building of the Boston Public Library.

In the 1960s library services moved from the building. It was then used by the town as a senior center for a time, and in 1984 the building opened as a museum.

== See also ==
- National Register of Historic Places listings in Hartford County, Connecticut
- List of Carnegie libraries in Connecticut
