= Haviland and Elizabeth Streets–Hanford Place Historic District =

Historic district in Connecticut, United States

- U.S. National Register of Historic Places
- U.S. Historic district
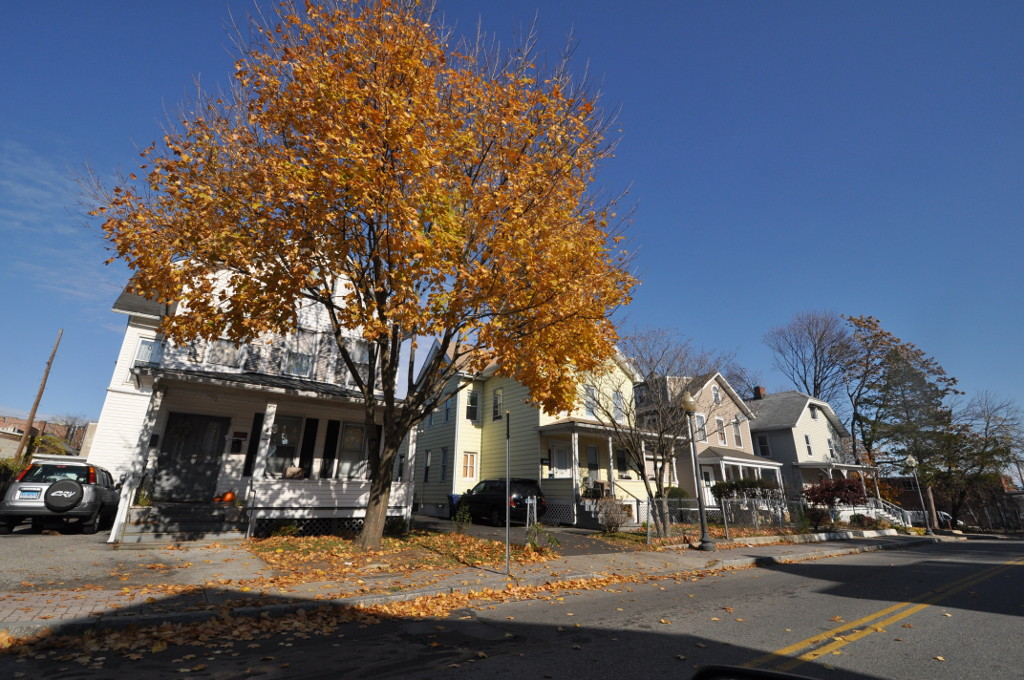
- Houses on Hanford Place

- Location within Connecticut Location within the United States
- Location: Roughly bounded by Haviland, Day Streets, Hanford Place, and South Main Street, Norwalk, Connecticut
- Coordinates: 41°5′49″N 73°25′7″W
- Area: 4.3 acres (1.7 ha)
- Architectural style: Second Empire, Italianate, Queen Anne
- NRHP reference No.: 88000664
- Added to NRHP: May 26, 1988

The Haviland and Elizabeth Streets–Hanford Place Historic District is an irregularly shaped 4.3-acre (1.7 ha) historic district in Norwalk, Connecticut that was listed on the National Register of Historic Places in 1988. It encompasses a neighborhood that developed in the late 19th century following the introduction of railroad service to South Norwalk.

== Description and history ==
The district lies within a primarily commercial area of the South Norwalk neighborhood. It includes 36 contributing buildings and 2 non-contributing ones. The district is significant as a cohesive grouping of late 19th and early 20th century residential architecture. Eight houses are Queen Anne style, which involves irregular massing and use of turned or sawn woodwork in porches and elsewhere. Others display Colonial Revival elements, including Tuscan columns on some. Some are Italianate or display aspects of that style. Second Empire style is also represented.

Prior to the arrival of the railroad station and depot in South Norwalk in 1870, the area was economically focused on the waterfront, with oyster fishing its primary industry. The railroad spurred the introduction of factories and industrial production, resulting in the related growth of residential housing and a thriving commercial district. This historic district encompasses a cross section of residential architecture from this period of growth.

== Listed buildings ==
The buildings included in the district are:

1. 3 Elizabeth Street, Colonial Revival vernacular, c. 1900 (see accompanying photo #6)
2. 5 Elizabeth Street, Queen Anne, c. 1900 (see accompanying photo #6)
3. 7 Elizabeth Street, Queen Anne, c. 1900 (see accompanying photo #6)
4. 8 Elizabeth Street, Italianate, c. 1875, with Colonial Revival entrance porch
5. 9 Elizabeth Street, c. 1870 (see accompanying photo #6)
6. rear of 9 Elizabeth Street, c. 1920 (see accompanying photo #7)
7. 9 Elizabeth Street, 3 bay fieldstone garage (see accompanying photo #15)
8. 10 Elizabeth Street, Italianate vernacular, c. 1875 with Queen Anne style porch
9. 11 Elizabeth Street, Italianate, c. 1880
10. 12 Elizabeth Street
11. 13 Elizabeth Street
12. 14 Elizabeth Street
13. 15 Elizabeth Street
14. 17 Elizabeth Street, Italianate, c.1885
15. 2 Hanford Place, Queen Anne, c. 1880 (see photos #13 and #19)
16. 3 Hanford Place
17. 4 Hanford Place
18. 5 Hanford Place
19. 6 Hanford Place
20. 7 Hanford Place
21. 8 Hanford Place
22. 9 Hanford Place
23. 10 Hanford Place, Queen Anne, c.1890
24. 11 Hanford Place, Queen Anne, c.1880, includes a barn or carriagehouse (see photo #15)
25. 12 Hanford Place
26. 8 Haviland Street
27. 10 Haviland Street, non-contributing
28. 12 Haviland Street
29. 16 Haviland Street
30. 18 Haviland Street (see photo #4)
31. 20 Haviland Street (see photo #4)
32. 22 Haviland Street (see photo #5)
33. 24 Haviland Street
34. 26 Haviland Street
35. 72 South Main Street (see accompanying photos #3 and #20)
36. 74 South Main Street

== See also ==
- National Register of Historic Places listings in Fairfield County, Connecticut
