= South Main and Washington Streets Historic District =

Historic district in Connecticut, United States

- U.S. National Register of Historic Places
- U.S. Historic district
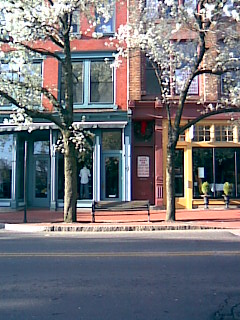
- Buildings along Washington Street, April 2009

- Location within Connecticut Location within the United States
- Location: 68-139 Washington Street and 2-24 South Main Street, (original); 11-15 through 54-60 South Main Street, (increase I); Roughly along North Main Street from Washington Street to Ann Street (increase II); Norwalk, Connecticut
- Coordinates: 41°5′55″N 73°24′22″W
- Area: 5.5 acres (2.2 ha) (original); 2.5 acres (1.0 ha) (first increase); 3 acres (1.2 ha) (second increase)
- Built: 1870
- Architectural style: Second Empire, Romanesque, Italianate (original); Late 19th And 20th Century Revivals, Late Victorian (increase I); Late Victorian, Late 19th And 20th Century Revivals (increase II)
- NRHP reference No.: 77001393 (original); 85003505 (increase 1); 99000449 (increase 2)

Significant dates
- Added to NRHP: December 16, 1977
- Boundary increases: November 8, 1985; April 15, 1999 (increase II)

The South Main and Washington Streets Historic District — 68-139 Washington Street and 2-24 South Main Street is a historic district in South Norwalk, Connecticut. The 110-acre (45 ha) district encompasses 35 buildings and two other structures (including the South Norwalk Railroad Bridge). Varied architectural styles from the late 19th and early 20th centuries include Romanesque Revival, Second Empire, and Italianate architecture. Half (5.5 acres (2.2 ha)) of the area first became part of the National Register of Historic Places in 1977 (35 buildings and two structures). The district was increased in 1985 with the addition of nine buildings on 2.5 acres (1.0 ha) (11-15 through 54-60 South Main Street) and again in 1999, with another 10 buildings on 3 acres (1.2 ha), roughly along North Main Street from Washington Street to Ann Street.

The original district included 26 contributing buildings and 2 other contributing structures over a 5.5-acre (2.2 ha) area. The district was first increased to add 9 contributing buildings over a 2.5-acre (1.0 ha) area. The second increase added 10 contributing buildings over a 3-acre (1.2 ha) area. The district is a densely packed area, with an 1895 railroad bridge at its "visual center". Its "primary significance" is as "an extensive and cohesive collection of late 19th century and early 20th century commercial structures."

== See also ==
- National Register of Historic Places listings in Fairfield County, Connecticut
