= List of Carnegie libraries in Connecticut =

Connecticut Carnegie libraries

The following list of Carnegie libraries in Connecticut provides detailed information on United States Carnegie libraries in Connecticut, where 11 libraries were built from 8 grants (totaling $191,900) awarded by the Carnegie Corporation of New York from 1901 to 1914.

== Key ==
Building still operating as a library
Building standing, but now serving another purpose
Building listed on the National Register of Historic Places

== Carnegie libraries ==
	Library	City or town	Image	Date granted	Grant amount	Location	Notes
1	Bridgeport East Branch	Bridgeport		Apr 13, 1914	$50,000	201 Jane St. 41°11′25″N 73°10′56″W	Designed by architect Edward Lippincott Tilton of New York City. This neoclassical building opened July 26, 1918, and was closed in the 1980s. It was recently a church.
2	Bridgeport North Branch	Bridgeport		Apr 13, 1914	($50,000)	3455 Madison Ave. 41°11′36″N 73°11′52″W	Designed by architect Edward Lippincott Tilton of New York City. This Neo-Renaissance building opened July 25, 1918, and served as a library until 1995. It is currently for sale.
3	Derby Neck	Derby		Mar 12, 1906	$3,400	307 Hawthorne Ave. 41°19′53″N 73°06′03″W	Designed by architect Henry Killam Murphy of New York City. Major expansions in 1972 and 2002 allowed this neoclassical design to be greatly enlarged. It opened January 5, 1907.
4	Enfield	Enfield		Nov 9, 1910	$20,000	159 Pearl St. 41°59′42″N 72°35′25″W	Designed by architects McLean & Wright of Boston. Opened May 5, 1914, this building remains a branch of the larger Enfield central library.
5	New Haven Fair Haven Branch	New Haven		Mar 14, 1913	$60,000	182 Grand Ave. 41°18′34″N 72°53′40″W	Designed by architect Leoni W. Robinson of New Haven. Opened in 1916, this building underwent a major renovation in 1993.
6	New Haven Davenport Branch	New Haven		Mar 14, 1913	($60,000)	265 Portsea St. 41°17′50″N 72°56′06″W	Designed by architect Charles Scranton Palmer of New Haven. This building was used as a library from 1922 until 1978 but is now used as a church and a radio station.
7	New Haven Dixwell Branch	New Haven		Mar 14, 1913	($60,000)	555 Dixwell Ave. 41°19′46″N 72°56′06″W	Designed by architects Norton & Townsend of New Haven. This building was used as a library from 1921 to 1968. It is now a church of the United Holy Church of America.
8	Norwalk	Norwalk		Aug 16, 1901	$20,000	1 Belden Ave. 41°07′16″N 73°24′55″W	Designed by architects W. & G. Audsley of New York City, this Elizabethan building was opened in 1903 and expanded greatly in 1982.
9	South Norwalk	South Norwalk		Apr 23, 1908	$20,000	10 Washington St. 41°05′59″N 73°25′16″W	Designed by architects McLean & Wright of Boston. Granted when South Norwalk was still independent of Norwalk, this building had additions built in 1950 and 2005.
10	Unionville	Unionville		Sep 25, 1914	$8,500	15 School St. 41°45′32″N 72°53′19″W	Designed by architect Edward Lippincott Tilton of New York City. This building was a library from 1917 to around 1970, after which it became the Unionville Museum.
11	West Haven	West Haven		Aug 6, 1906	$10,000	300 Elm St. 41°16′34″N 72°57′08″W	Designed by architects McLean & Wright of Boston. After opening September 1, 1909, it has remained in continuous use as a library since, expanding in 1960 and 2002.

== See also ==
- List of libraries in the United States
