= SONO 50 =

Office building in Norwalk, Connecticut

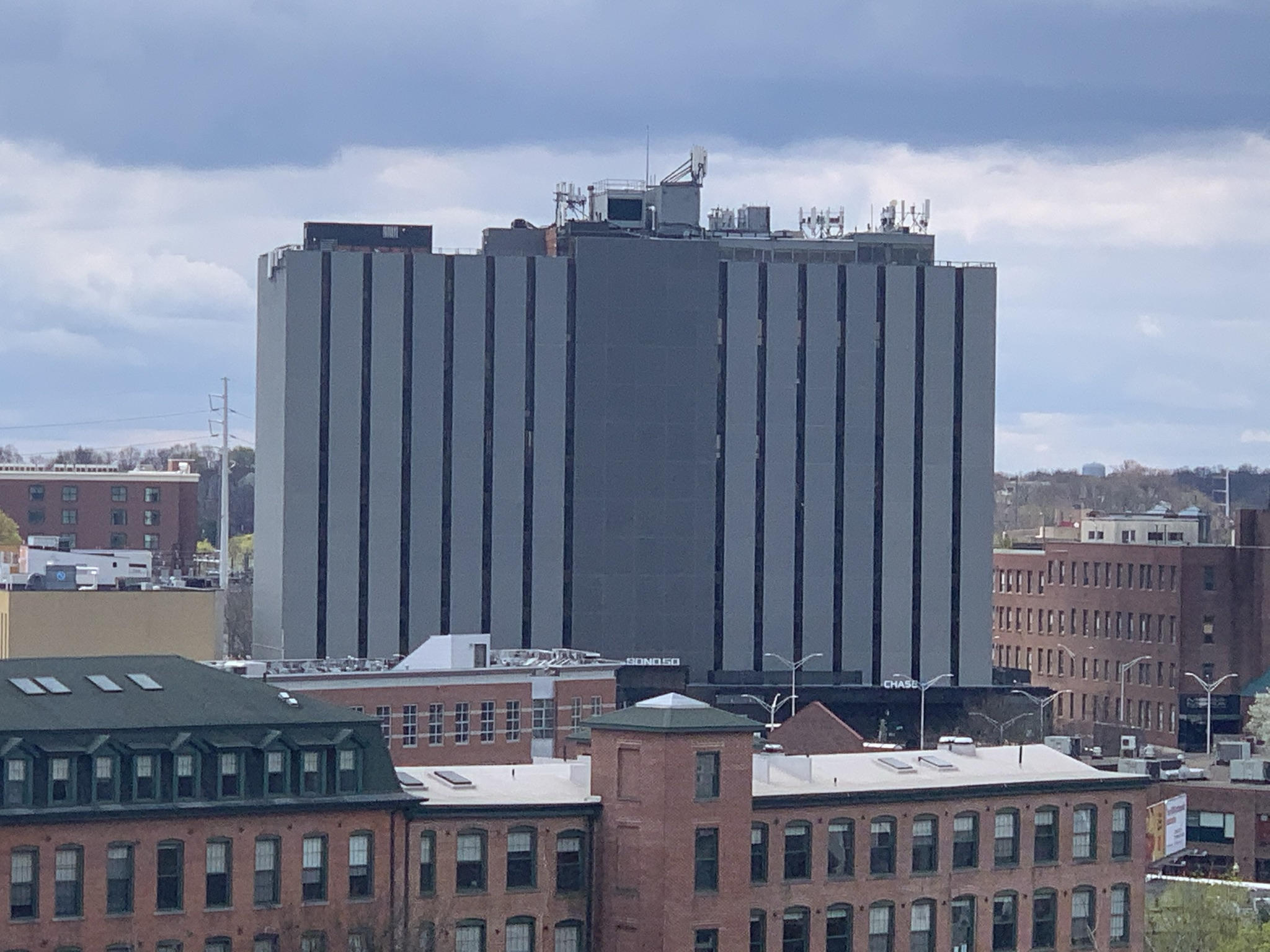
- SONO 50 in 2021
- Interactive map of the SONO 50 area

General information
- Type: Office Building
- Location: 50 Washington Street; Norwalk, Connecticut, U.S.
- Coordinates: 41.0994°N 73.4195°W
- Completed: 1970
- Renovated: 2015-2019
- Owner: Capital Equities Group

Height
- Roof: 150 ft (46 m)

Technical details
- Floor count: 14

SONO 50 (also known as the SoNo Corporate Center) is an office building in Norwalk, Connecticut in the modernist style. It is the tallest building in Norwalk, standing 14 stories and 150 feet (46 m) tall.

== Renovation ==
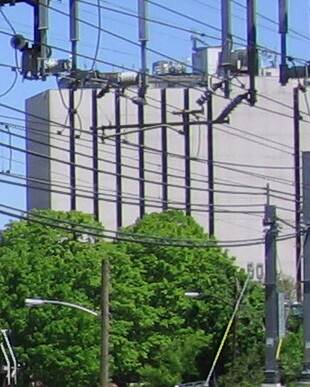
Seen in 2012, with its original facade

When Capital Equities Group acquired the building in 2014, work commenced on modernizing and upgrading the building's interior and exterior. Renovations included a new lobby, fitness center, and a repainting of the exterior facade. The building was generally considered an eyesore by the public, the original facade was a white color. In hopes of improving the aesthetics of the building, the exterior walls were painted over to grey in 2019, finishing the renovation process.

== See also ==
- SoNo Collection
