= Charles A. Scofield =

American politician (1853–1910)

11th Mayor of Norwalk, Connecticut
- In office 1907–1908
- Preceded by: Wallace Dann
- Succeeded by: John J. Cavanagh

Personal details
- Born: June 8, 1853 Connecticut
- Died: 1910
- Resting place: Stamford, Connecticut
- Party: Republican
- Spouse: Lilly M. Scofield

Charles Alfred Scofield (June 8, 1853 – 1910) was an American politician who was a one term Democratic mayor of Norwalk, Connecticut from 1907 to 1908. He defeated Democrat Ferdinand B. Smith for the office in 1907. He had previously served on the Norwalk City Council.

Preceded by Wallace Dann	Mayor of Norwalk, Connecticut; 1907–1908	Succeeded by John J. Cavanagh
