= Wallace Dann =

American politician (1847–1934)

10th Mayor of Norwalk, Connecticut
- In office 1905–1907
- Preceded by: Charles L. Glover
- Succeeded by: Charles A. Scofield

Member of the Connecticut House of Representatives from Norwalk, Connecticut
- In office 1903–1905 Serving with Jeremiah Donovan
- Preceded by: John H. Light, Elbert Adams
- Succeeded by: Mortimer M. Lee

Personal details
- Born: January 12, 1847 Stamford, Connecticut
- Died: 1934
- Resting place: Scott's Cemetery, Ridgefield, Connecticut
- Party: Democratic
- Spouse: Clarissa Jennie Dikeman
- Education: Wicoff's Academy
- Occupation: grocery, livery

Wallace Dann (January 12, 1847– 1934) was a two-term Democratic mayor of Norwalk, Connecticut from 1905 to 1907. He was also a member of the Connecticut House of Representatives from 1903 to 1905.

== Early life and family ==
He was born in Stamford, Connecticut on January 12, 1847. He was the son of William Edgar Dann, and Pauline Curtis Dann. He attended Professor Wicoff's Academy in New Canaan. He married Clarissa J. Dikeman on September 1, 1869. He was in the livery and grocery business in New Canaan.

== Political career ==
He was sheriff from 1875 to 1881 and from 1884 to 1887. He was police chief from 1892 to 1899. He was president of the Norwalk Brass Company beginning in 1901. On January 5, 1903, he was elected Water Commissioner.

From 1903 to 1904, he served in the Connecticut House of Representatives. He was a member of the School Fund Committee, and the Contested Elections Committee. He was a leader on the issue of whether South Norwalk and Norwalk would be separate or consolidated.

He ran for mayor of Norwalk, and served from 1905 to 1907. In 1906, he defeated Republican challenger Goold Hoyt for re-election.

In 1926, he was appointed by mayor Jeremiah Donovan to the Norwalk Board of Relief for a three-year term.

== Associations ==
- Member, Harmony Lodge of Masons, New Canaan
- High Priest (1884), Washington Chapter 24 Reformed and Accepted Masons.
- Member, Eminent Commander (1882), Clinton Commandery Number 3 Knights Templar
- Member, Pyramid Temple of Bridgeport
- Member, Odd Fellows
- Member, Mecca Temple, Nobles of the Mystic Shrine
- Vestryman, St. Paul's Episcopal Church
- Member, Sons of the American Revolution
- Member, Norwalk Club
- Member, Norwalk Board of Trade

Preceded by Elbert Adams; John H. Light	Member of the Connecticut House of Representatives from Norwalk; 1903 – 1905	Succeeded by Mortimer M. Lee
Preceded by Charles L. Glover	Mayor of Norwalk, Connecticut; 1905 – 1907	Succeeded by Charles A. Scofield
