= John H. Light =

American politician (1855–1947)

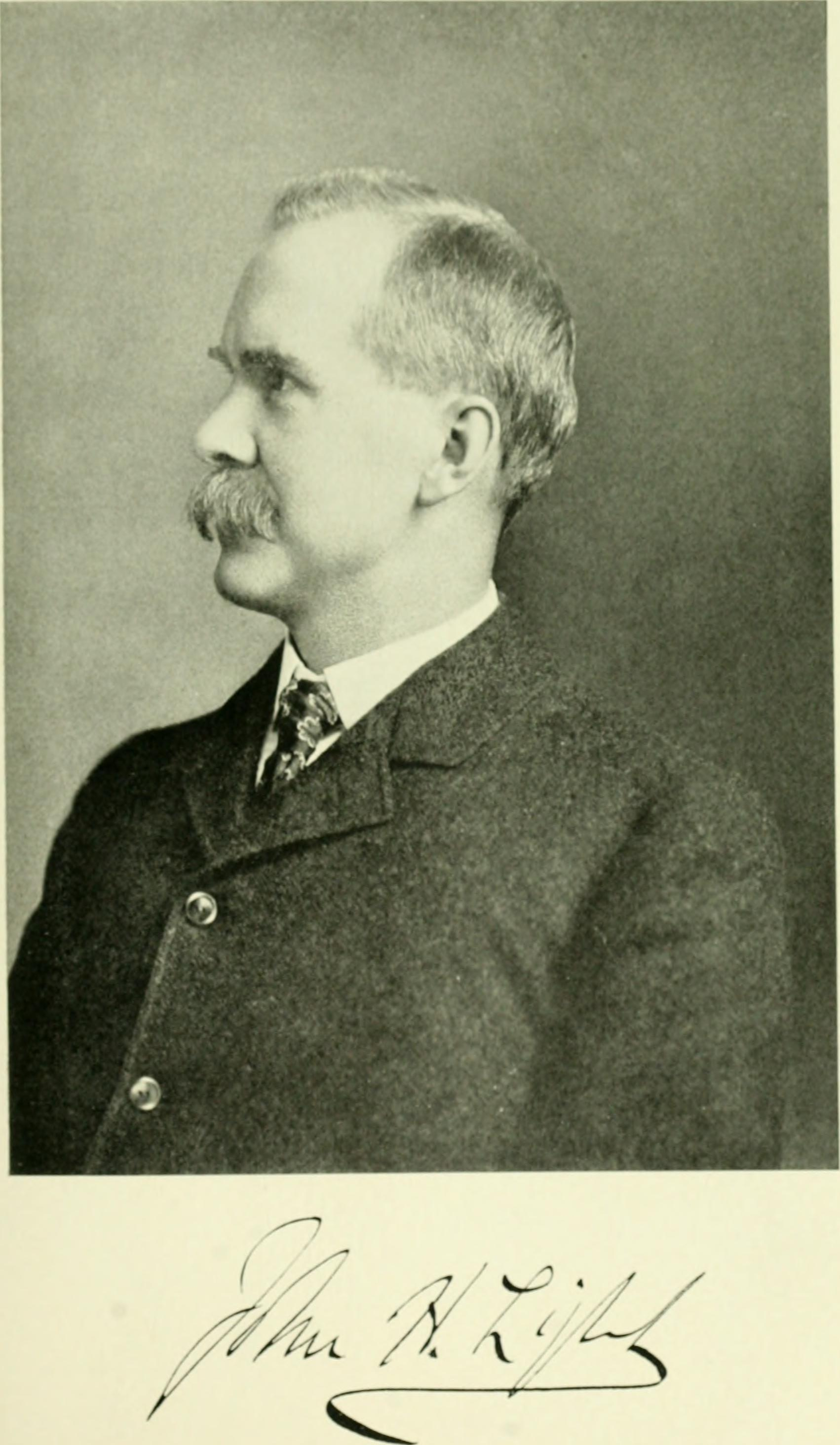

Connecticut Attorney General
- In office September 15, 1910 – 1915
- Governor: Frank B. Weeks
- Preceded by: Marcus H. Holcomb
- Succeeded by: George E. Hinman

Speaker of the Connecticut House of Representatives
- In office 1901–1902

Member of the Connecticut House of Representatives from Norwalk
- In office 1899–1903
- Preceded by: Russell Frost, Belden Hurlbutt
- Succeeded by: Wallace Dann, Jeremiah Donovan

Personal details
- Born: John Henry Light; March 27, 1855 Carmel, New York, US
- Died: 1947 (aged 91–92)
- Resting place: Norwalk, Connecticut, US
- Party: Republican
- Education: Chamberlain Institute and Female College
- Occupation: teacher, lawyer

John Henry Light (1855–1947) was a Republican attorney general for the state of Connecticut and speaker of the Connecticut House of Representatives.

== Early life ==
Light was born in Carmel, New York in 1855, to Belden Light and Ann (Keenan) Light. He moved with his parents to New Canaan, Connecticut at a young age, and his first job was at a tannery, where he earned money to fund his education. He married Ida M. Lockwood on August 3, 1881.

Light graduated from Chamberlain Institute and Female College in New York (an early coeducational institution). Light was a schoolteacher while being instructed in the law. He passed the Connecticut bar examination in 1883 and commenced a practice in Light settled in South Norwalk, Connecticut, now part of Norwalk.

== Political career ==
He served as Fairfield County Treasurer from 1899 to 1906. He also served for two terms in the Connecticut House of Representatives, from 1899 and 1901, serving as speaker in 1901. Light served as a Connecticut common pleas court judge from 1901 to 1905.

On September 15, 1910, Governor Frank B. Weeks appointed him Connecticut Attorney General to fill the unexpired term of Marcus H. Holcomb. Elected to a four-year term in November 1910, he served as Attorney General until 1915.

Light was a Congregationalist. He was a Freemason and a member of the Knights Templar, Shriners, and Odd Fellows. Light was also a student of the classics noted for his extensive private library.

Preceded by Russell Frost; Belden Hurlbutt	Member of the Connecticut House of Representatives from Norwalk; 1899 – 1903	Succeeded by Wallace Dann; Jeremiah Donovan
Preceded by.	Speaker of the Connecticut House of Representatives; 1901 – 1902	Succeeded by.
Preceded by Marcus H. Holcomb	Connecticut Attorney General; 1910 – 1915	Succeeded by George E. Hinman
