= George E. Hinman =

American judge

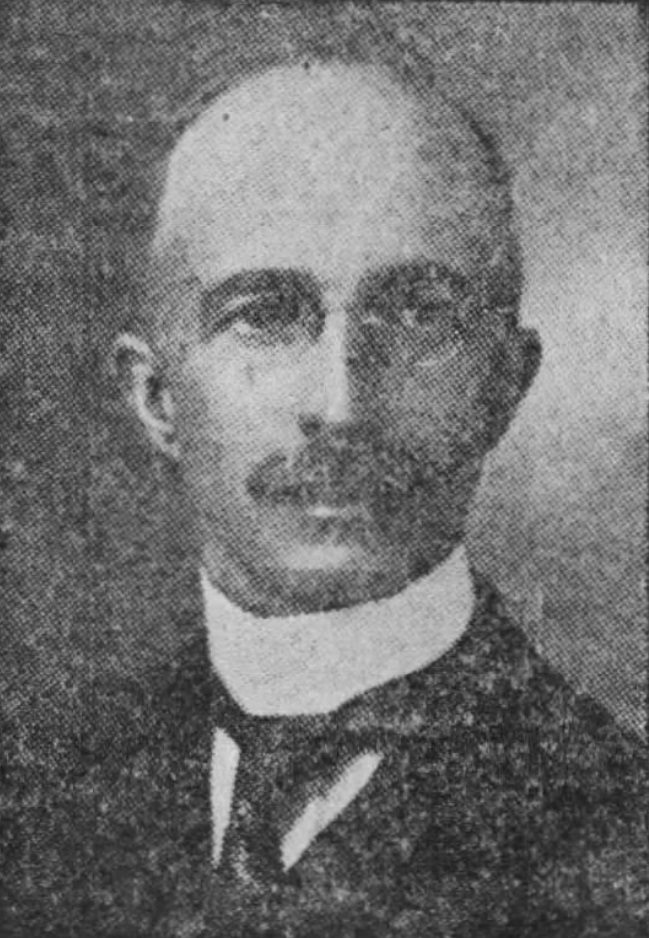

Personal details
- Born: George Elijah Hinman; May 7, 1870 Alford, Massachusetts
- Died: March 19, 1961 (aged 90)
- Party: Republican
- Occupation: Journalist, editor, lawyer, judge

George Elijah Hinman (May 7, 1870 – March 19, 1961) was an American lawyer and politician from the state of Connecticut. He was a Republican.

Hinman was born in Alford, Massachusetts in 1870 to William C. and Mary A. Gates Hinman. Hinman's family was from Connecticut: his father from Litchfield County and his mother from Norwich. Hinman graduated from high school in Great Barrington, Massachusetts in 1888, and became a newspaperman, working at the Berkshire Courier, published in Great Barrington, as reporter and advertising manager and later as local editor.

Hinman settled in Connecticut and became city editor of the Willimantic Daily Herald. In 1892, he became editor of the Willimantic Journal. He left the Journal in 1895 in order to study law: He studied under William A. King in Willimantic and in 1897 and 1898 took a special course at the Yale Law School, where he won the Thompson Prize for scholastic achievement.

In 1899 Hinman was admitted to the bar in Connecticut. On September 26, 1899, of that year, he married Nettie P. Williams of Willimantic, who died June 14, 1932.

Hinman was active in the Republican Party and served as secretary of the state central committee from 1902 to 1914. From 1899 until 1915, he served as a clerk in seven biennial sessions of the Connecticut General Assembly, beginning as assistant clerk of the House of Representatives and becoming clerk of the House in 1901 and clerk of the Senate in 1903. Hinman was appointed assistant clerk of the state constitutional convention of 1902. In the 1905, 1907 and 1911 sessions he was clerk of bills and in the session of 1909 engrossing clerk. In these positions he drafted legislation.

In 1914, Hinman received the Republican nomination for Connecticut Attorney General, serving in that post from 1915 to 1918. On February 13, 1919, he was appointed a judge of the Superior Court for an eight-year term beginning the following August 23. On February 19, 1925, he was appointed an associate justice of the Connecticut Supreme Court of Errors, the state supreme court, effective February 26, 1926. Hinman served on the Court until May 7, 1940, when he reached the mandatory retirement age of 70. After leaving the bench Hinman served as a state referee until shortly his death in 1961.

He was interred at Old Willimantic Cemetery in Windham. Hinman had two children: Russell William, who became a paper manufacturer in Penacook, New Hampshire, and Virginia Gates Allen, with Hinman lived with until his death.
