= South Norwalk, Connecticut =

South Norwalk
- Taxing District
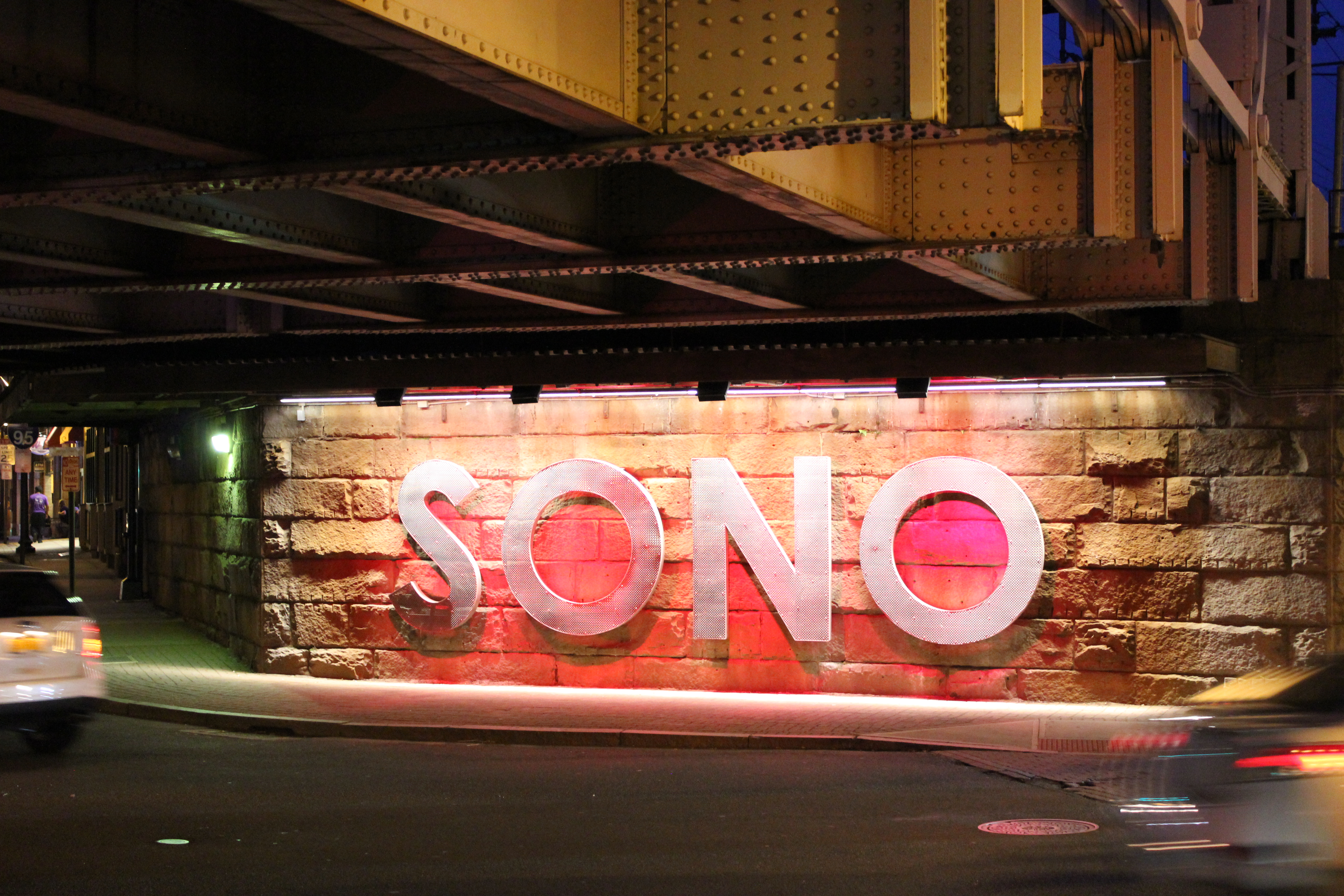
- SoNo illuminated sign

- Location within Connecticut Location within the United States
- Coordinates: 41.11°N 73.42°W
- Country: United States
- State: Connecticut
- County: Fairfield
- City: Norwalk
- Founded: August 18, 1870
- Incorporated with Norwalk: June 6, 1913
- ZIP code: 06854
- Area codes: 203, 475

South Norwalk is a neighborhood in Norwalk, Connecticut which corresponds to the city's Second Taxing District. Often referred to as SoNo, the neighborhood was originally settled as Old Well, then chartered as the city of South Norwalk on August 18, 1870. The cities of Norwalk and South Norwalk were incorporated on June 6, 1913. South Norwalk underwent major redevelopment during the early 21st century, with many new apartments being constructed, often in close proximity to South Norwalk station, and generally more expensive than existing housing.

South Norwalk is a diverse neighborhood both from a socioeconomic and racial perspective.

The neighborhood hosts the annual SoNo Arts Festival, an event that showcases local artists, businesses, and musical acts. The annual Norwalk Oyster Festival, sponsored by the Norwalk Seaport Association, is held at Veteran's Memorial Park, across the Norwalk Harbor in East Norwalk.

== History ==
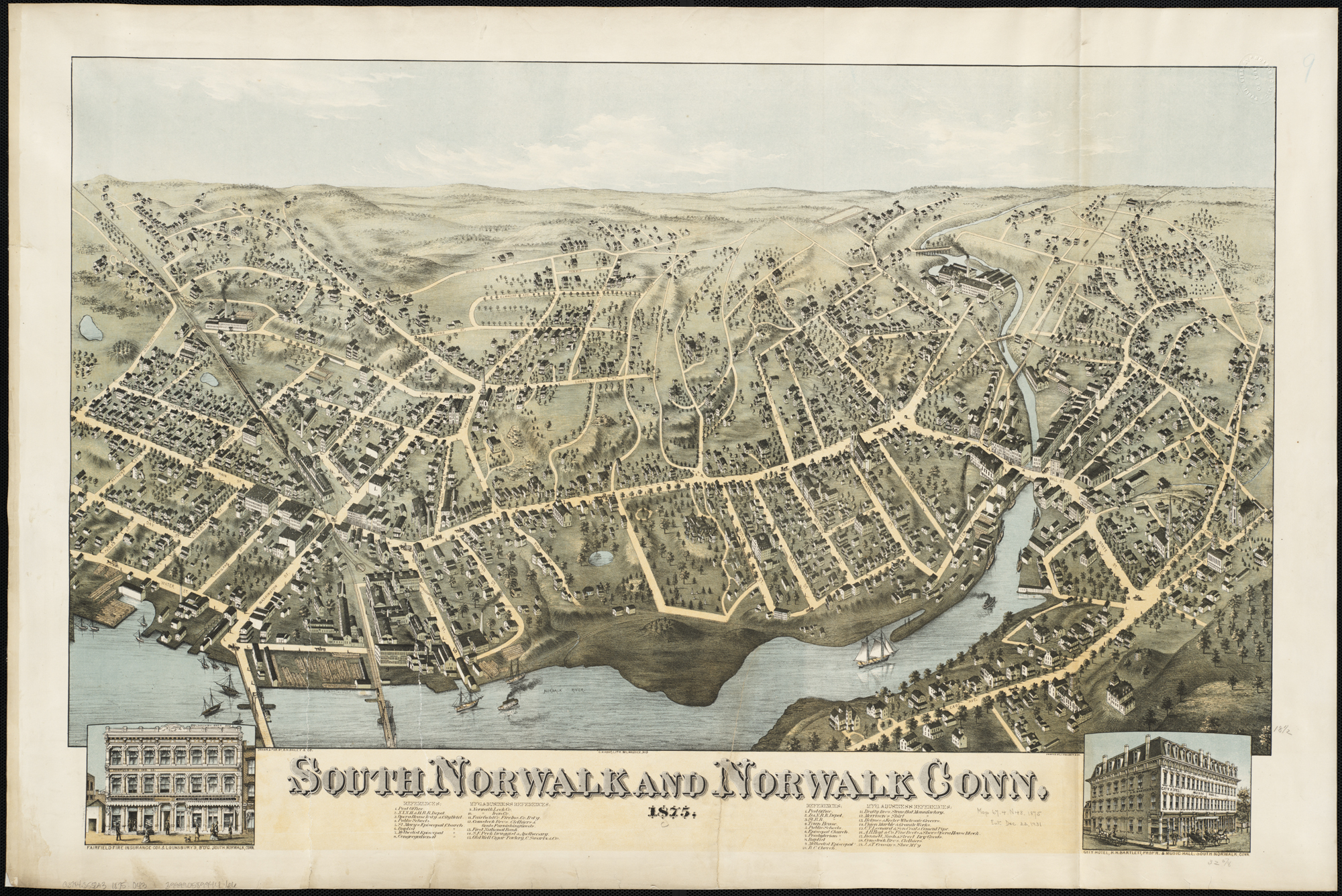
Map of South Norwalk and Norwalk, CT

=== Old Well ===
The area of present-day South Norwalk developed out of a local well referred to as the "Old Well", where sailing ships would refill their water casks. Said well was in service since at least 1738, when a deed referred to nearby Washington Street as "the highway that leads to ye landing place called Ye Old Well". The well's location was depicted as east of Water Street, and about 75 feet South of Washington Street in a 1867 map by American cartographer Frederick W. Beers, although the exact location is unknown, though presumed to be near the site of Donovan's Tavern, since sailors are said to have frequented the tavern.

The area evolved into a settlement named Old Well. after the well, and was involved in coastal trade, manufacturing, and shipbuilding, as well as having many farms with diversified crops.

“Old Well was scarcely a village in those days, but rather a group of farms, and the well which gave the place its name was on Water Street, near the corner of Haviland street, on the property of Eliakim Raymond, a patriarch of several Norwalk lines. His house stood at the corner of Washington and Water streets before the Revolution and was burned with rest of the town."

=== City of South Norwalk ===
"Norwalk was made a borough in 1836, and the village of Old Well, named from an ancient well where vessels were supplied with water, was incorporated into a city in 1868, and named South Norwalk two years afterward." "South Norwalk, formerly called "Old Well" was organized a city August 18, 1870, under a charter granted by the Legislature of Connecticut, July 5 of the same year". In 1873, the City of South Norwalk was incorporated within the Town of Norwalk, although it maintained its city status and retained control over its own assets. "The 1870 charter was revised by the Legislature April 19, 1882, and the city continued its existence under this revised charter until May 27, 1897, when the Legislature approved a revised and amended charter, under which the city has since continued and worked."

Around this time, Norwalk had refused to share its water system with South Norwalk, contributing to a sense of ill will between the two cities, which would compete for economic development throughout subsequent decades.

"In the 1800s, industrialization started to take place--large factories manufacturing goods such as firearms, buttons, shoes, cloth and hats were increasing in Connecticut and in Norwalk. Workers came up from Chesapeake, Maryland, to work as oystermen. Wealthy owners and managers of businesses lived on Golden Hill overlooking South Norwalk. Immigrants came into Norwalk from many places. One of the largest [group] to come here in the early 1900s was the Hungarians; there were also many Eastern European Jews and Italians, among others."

Horse-drawn trolleys began serving South Norwalk in the 1860s, until being upgraded to electric trolleys in 1894.

Industrialization in South Norwalk resulted in the city becoming a center for local industry, hosting its own railroad station, the Norwalk Harbor, an electric trolley system, its own water company, electric company, and well-developed school system.

==== Consolidation into Norwalk ====
Despite the industrialization of South Norwalk, various economic forces pressured the city South Norwalk to merge into Norwalk, as both cities were often too small independent of one another to host large industries. South Norwalk was hesitant to consolidate into Norwalk, due to South Norwalk's industry surpassing that of Norwalk. South Norwalk, alongside East Norwalk, even tried to leave the Town of Norwalk altogether in 1902, with South Norwalk's mayor Mortimer M. Lee touting that South Norwalk had "a large water system, a splendid electric light plant, a separate sewer system, a public library and a library building and schools second to none". In 1903 the Connecticut State Legislature passed a bill to create an independent Town of South Norwalk, but it was vetoed by then-governor Abiram Chamberlain.

As a compromise, Norwalk allowed for South Norwalk, East Norwalk, and Rowayton to join Norwalk as taxing districts, allowing them to largely maintain their own municipal services while within Norwalk.

=== Within Norwalk ===
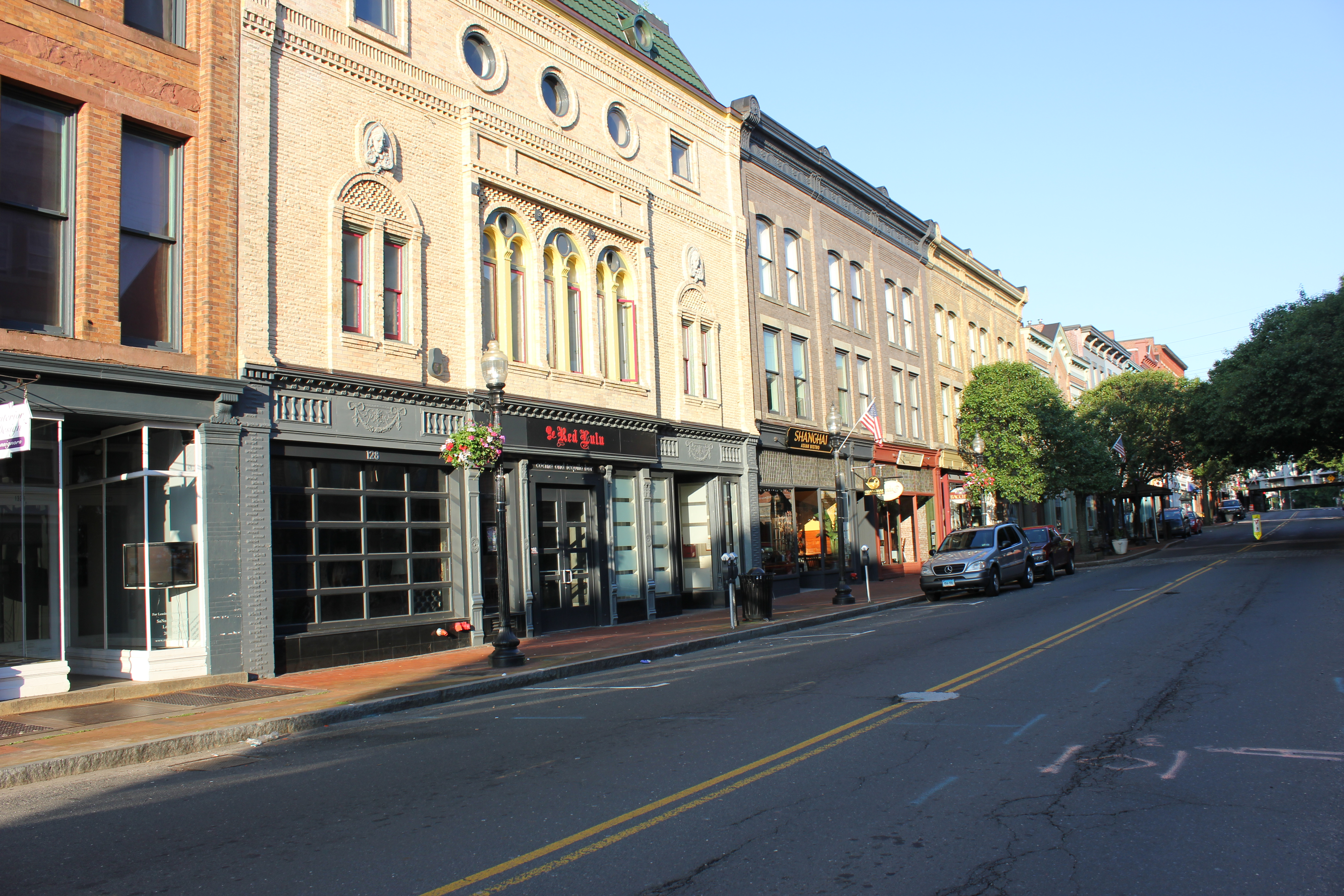
A street scene along a portion of Washington Street, part of the South Main and Washington Streets Historic District created in 1977

In 1935, South Norwalk's trolley system was discontinued, and replaced by a bus service.

South Norwalk began suffering from a period of deindustrialization in the 1950s, as many industries, including Norwalk's sizable hat industry, either went into decline or relocated out of New England. This industrial decay led to the enactment of various urban renewal projects beginning in the 1960s, namely, the demolition of older buildings and factories along western Washington Street to build new offices, a shopping center, and low-cost housing. The Norwalk Redevelopment Agency planned to continue this effort in the 1970s, with plans to replace the older buildings along eastern Washington Street, but were thwarted by local residents, who successfully got the buildings added to the National Register of Historic Places in 1977.

In 1988, the Maritime Aquarium was opened in a disused factory building.

During the 21st century, South Norwalk has seen a period of redevelopment centered around the construction of new apartments, many of which are located near South Norwalk Station.

== Geography ==
Administratively, the Norwalk Second Taxing District, synonymous with South Norwalk, is bordered by Route 1 (locally signed as Connecticut Avenue) to the north, and the Norwalk Harbor and the Norwalk River to the east. The neighborhood's southern border runs from Windsor Place to Neptune Avenue, up against the Norwalk River, and the neighborhood's western border runs from Windsor Place up to Connecticut Avenue.

== Demographics ==
All of South Norwalk is represented by the 06854 ZIP Code, which also includes some areas to its south and west. As of 2020, the ZIP Code has an average family income of $74,597, slightly below the Connecticut average of $79,855; the poverty rate is 14.5%, higher than the Connecticut total of 9.8%; 34.2% of the population has a Bachelor's degree or higher, below the state total of 40.0%; the ZIP code has an employment rate 65.4%, higher than the Connecticut total of 61.7%; 22.0% of the population lacks health care coverage, significantly higher than the state total of 5.1%; 22.5% of the population is under 18 years old, slightly higher than the state total of 20.6%; the average household size is 3.25, slightly higher than the state total of 3.08.

== The SoNo Collection ==
The SoNo Collection is a 700,000 square foot mall located next to Interstate 95 and Route 7 that was opened in October 2019. It was built by Brookfield Properties and is the fourth mall in the Fairfield County. It features southern Connecticut's only locations of the department stores Nordstrom and Bloomingdale's.

== National Register of Historic Places ==
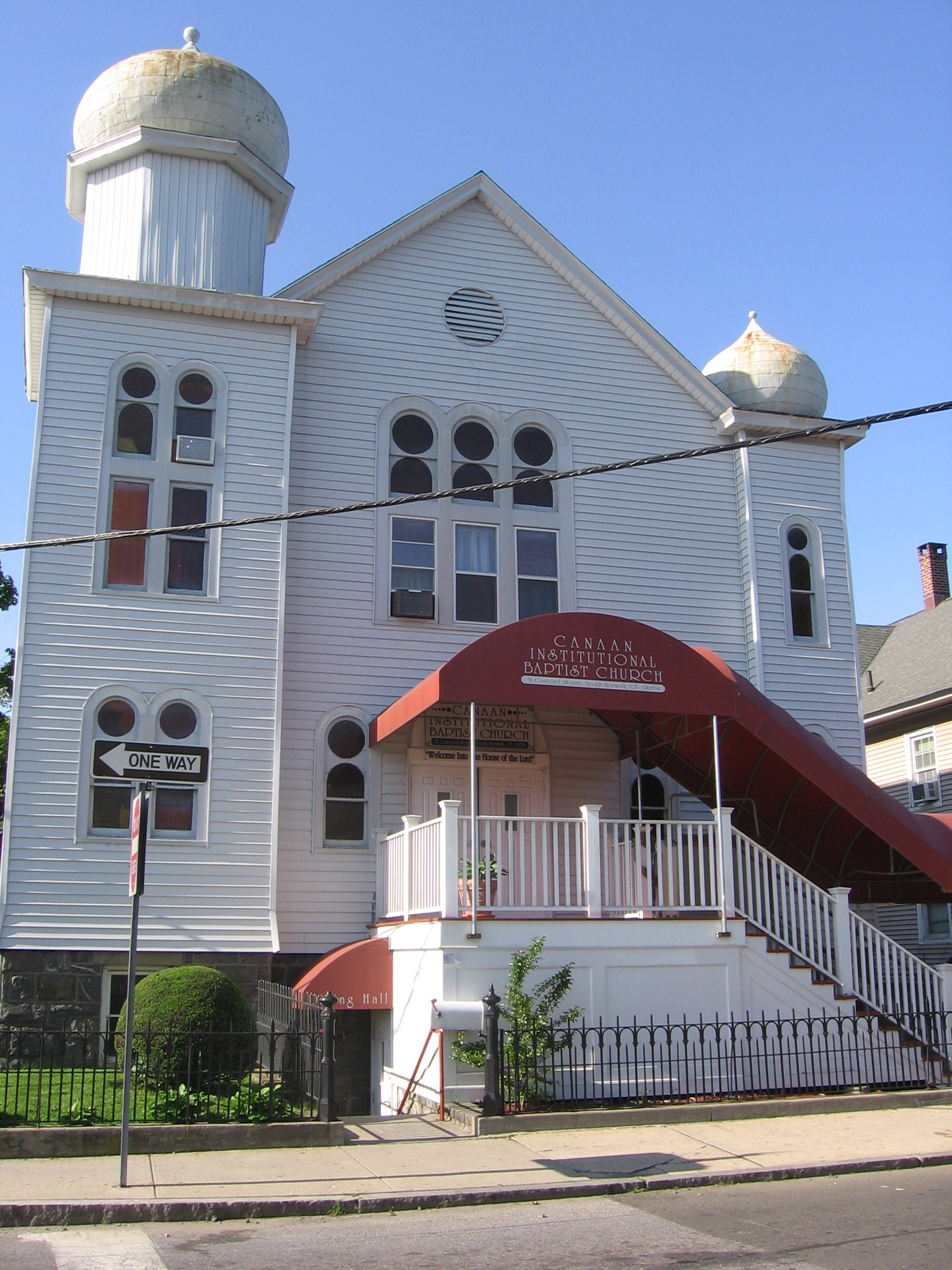
Canaan Institutional Baptist Church

- Beth Israel Synagogue (Norwalk, Connecticut) 31 Concord Street, now the Canaan Institutional Baptist Church.
- Haviland and Elizabeth Streets-Hanford Place Historic District Roughly bounded by Haviland and Elizabeth and Day Streets, Hanford Place, and South Main Street in South Norwalk.

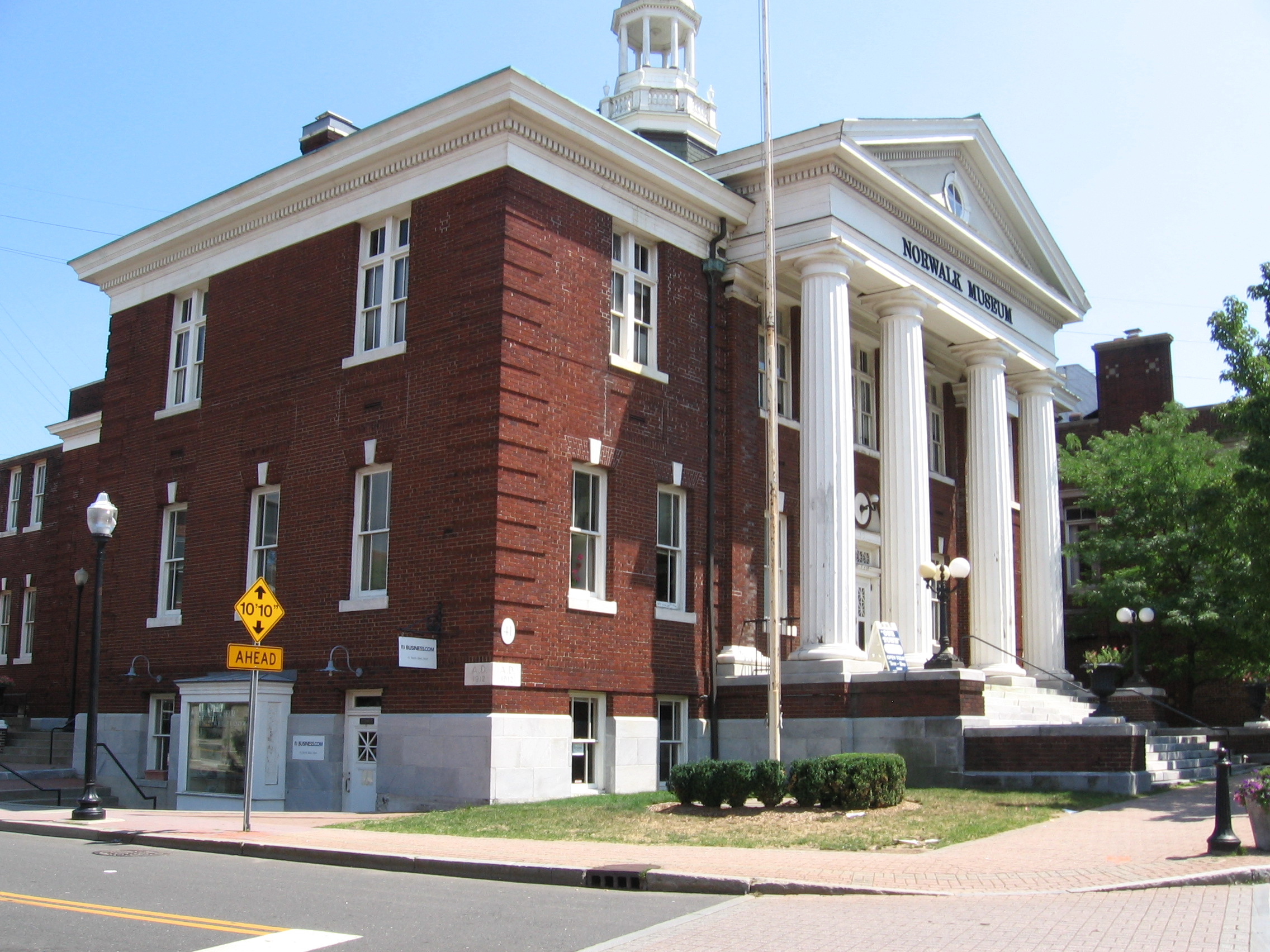
Former City Hall

- Norwalk City Hall Completed in 1912, when South Norwalk was an autonomous municipal entity, 41 North Main Street originally served as the South Norwalk Town Hall.

The Norwalk Historical Society along with the Norwalk Historical Commission reopened the Norwalk Historical Society Museum at the Lockwood House at 141 East Avenue. The archives, genealogy and unframed photographs was placed with the “History Room” at the Norwalk Public Library Main branch (1 Belden Avenue, Norwalk, CT). It includes items from the four collections: City of Norwalk, Lockwood family, Norwalk Historical Society and the Connecticut Daughters of the American Revolution (DAR) and Norwalk-Village Green Chapter.

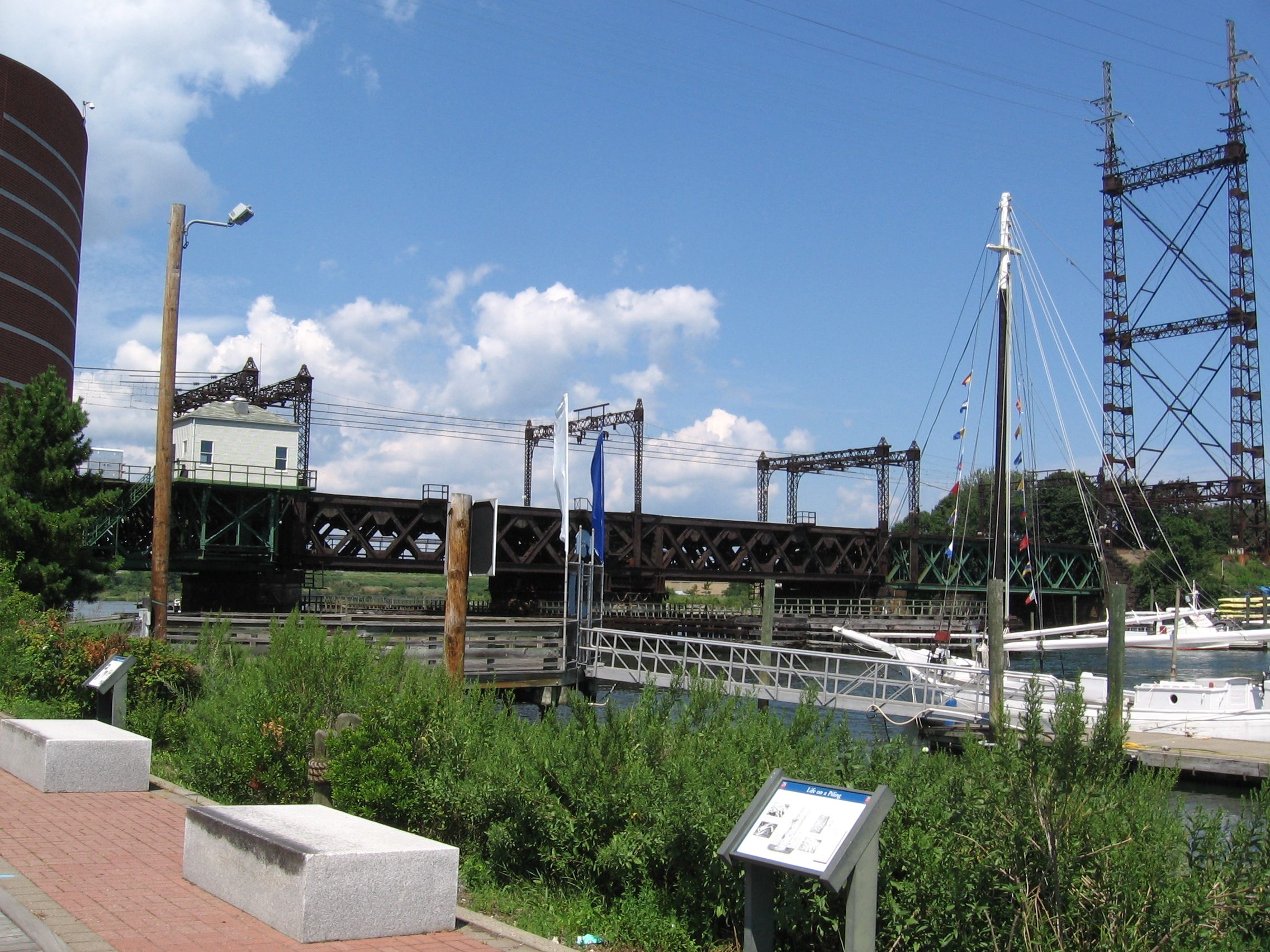
Norwalk River Railroad Bridge

- Norwalk River Railroad Bridge This bridge was built in 1896 as part of the New York, New Haven & Hartford Railroad's massive re-building of its New York to New Haven main line.
- South Main and Washington Streets Historic District The district encompasses 35 buildings and two other structures (including the South Norwalk Railroad Bridge).
- United States Post Office–South Norwalk Main Also known as Norwalk Main Post Office 16 Washington Street South Norwalk, CT

== Emergency services ==
The Norwalk Police Department is located at 1 Monroe Street near the heart of SoNo. The Norwalk Fire Department currently operates two Fire Stations in or near South Norwalk:

- Station Two- Headquarters, 121 Connecticut Avenue
- Station Five, 23 Meadow Street

== See also ==
- South Norwalk (Metro-North station)
- South Norwalk Railroad Bridge
- St. Ladislaus Church (South Norwalk, Connecticut)
- List of mayors of Norwalk, Connecticut
- Connecticut Wildcats
- List of Carnegie libraries in Connecticut
- Norwalk Harbor

== Images ==
Present Day

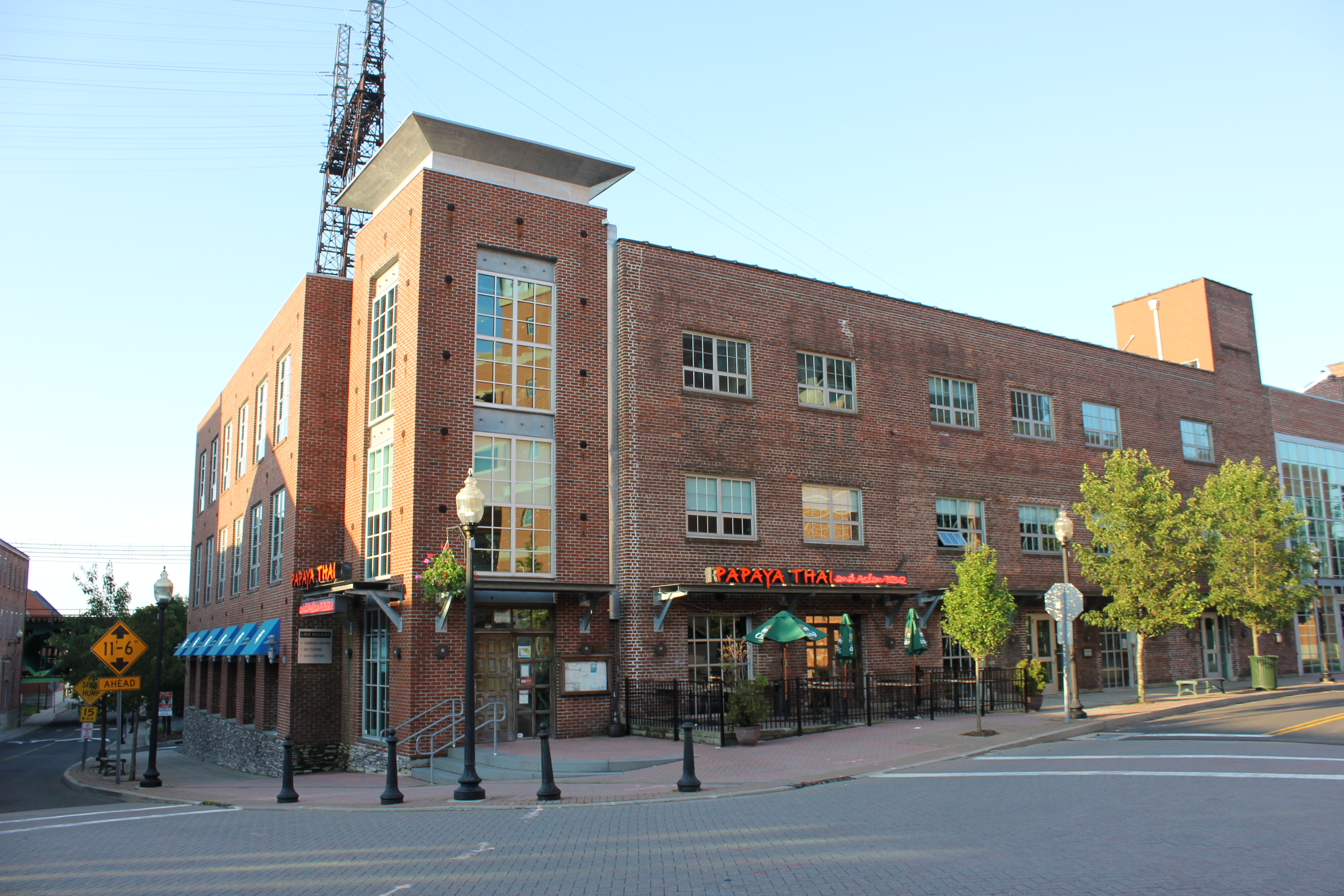
Corner of Marshall and North Water Streets

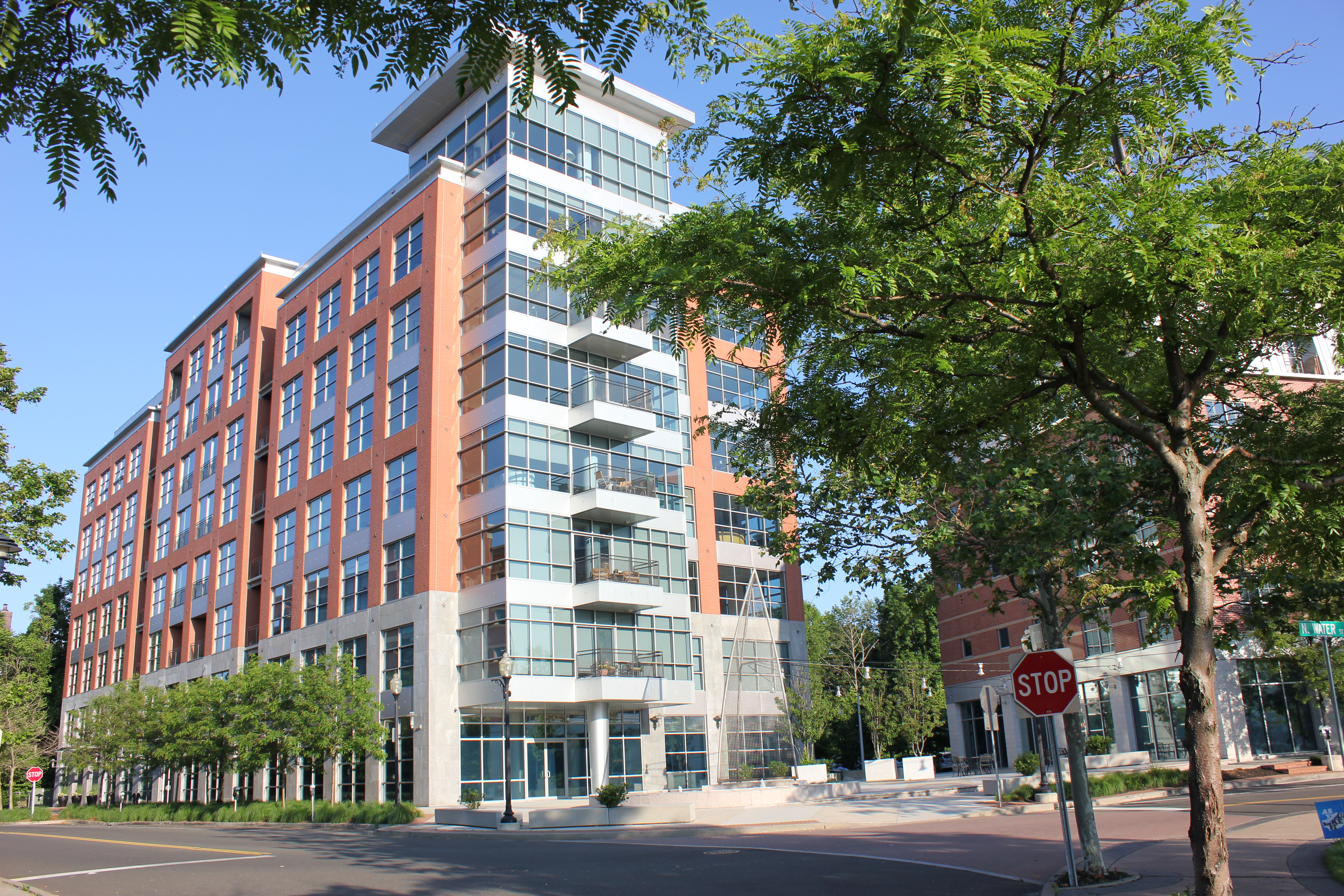
Maritime Condo Building

Mural outside Donovan's Restaurant

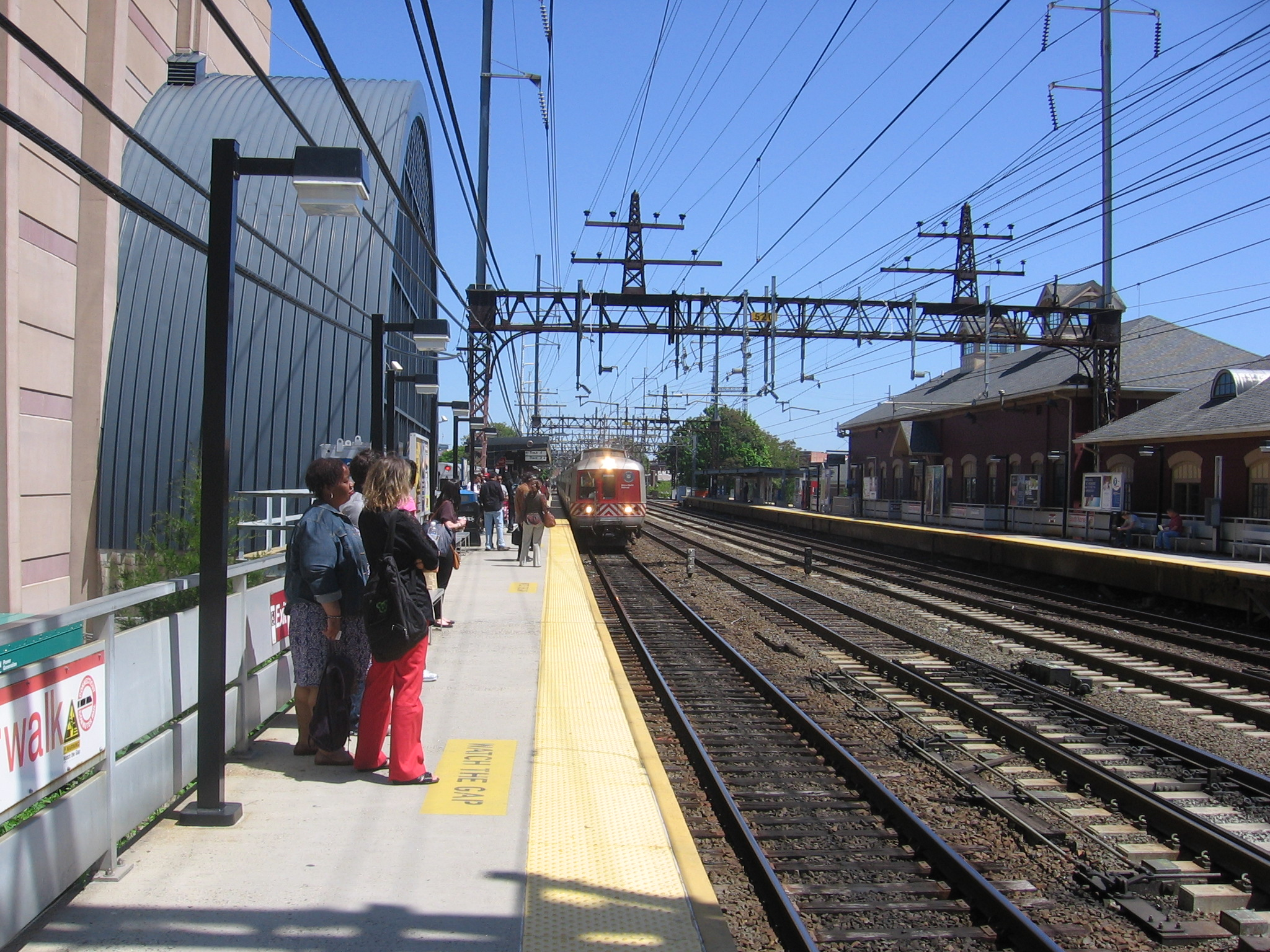
South Norwalk Train Station

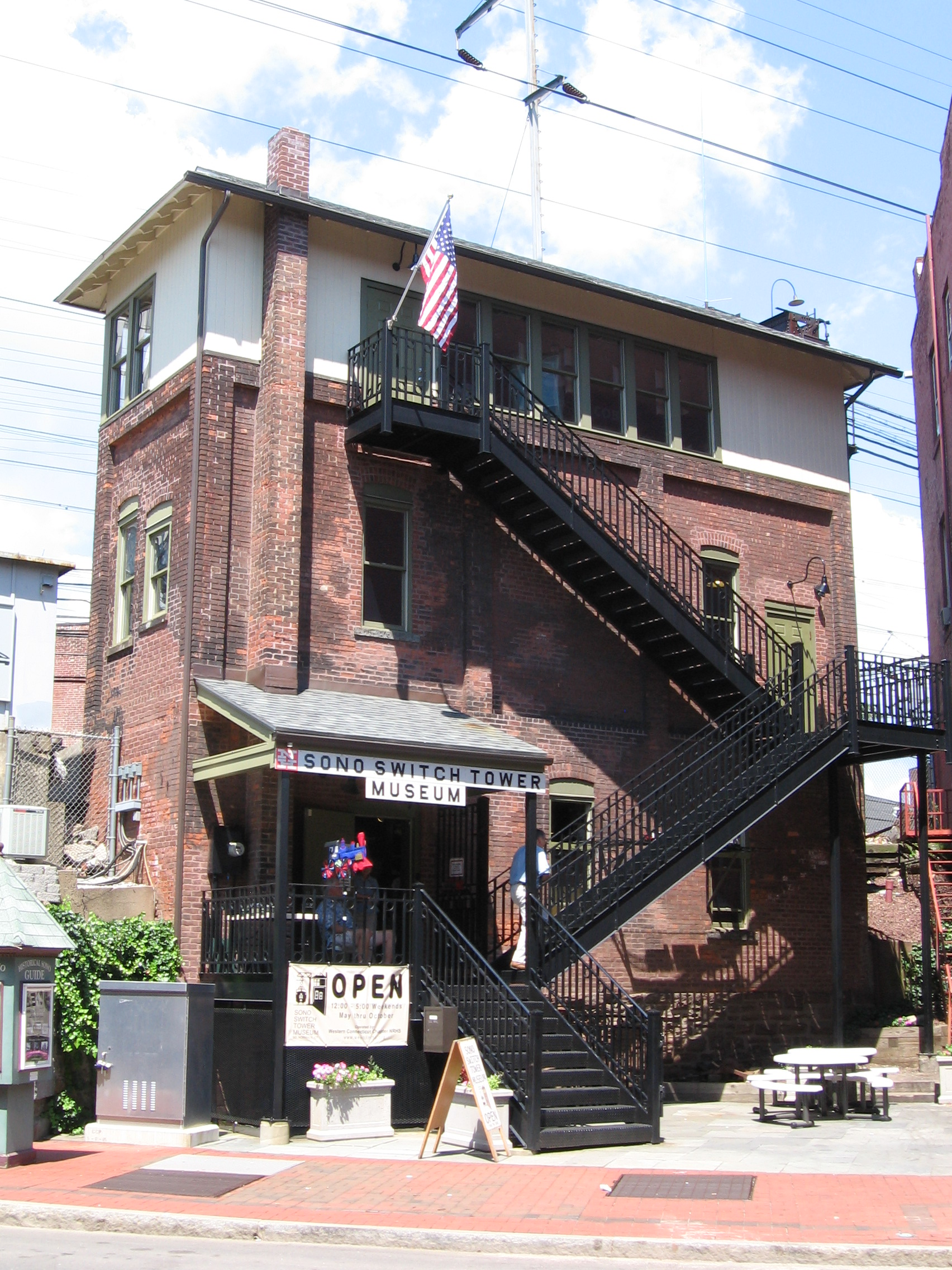
Switch Tower Museum

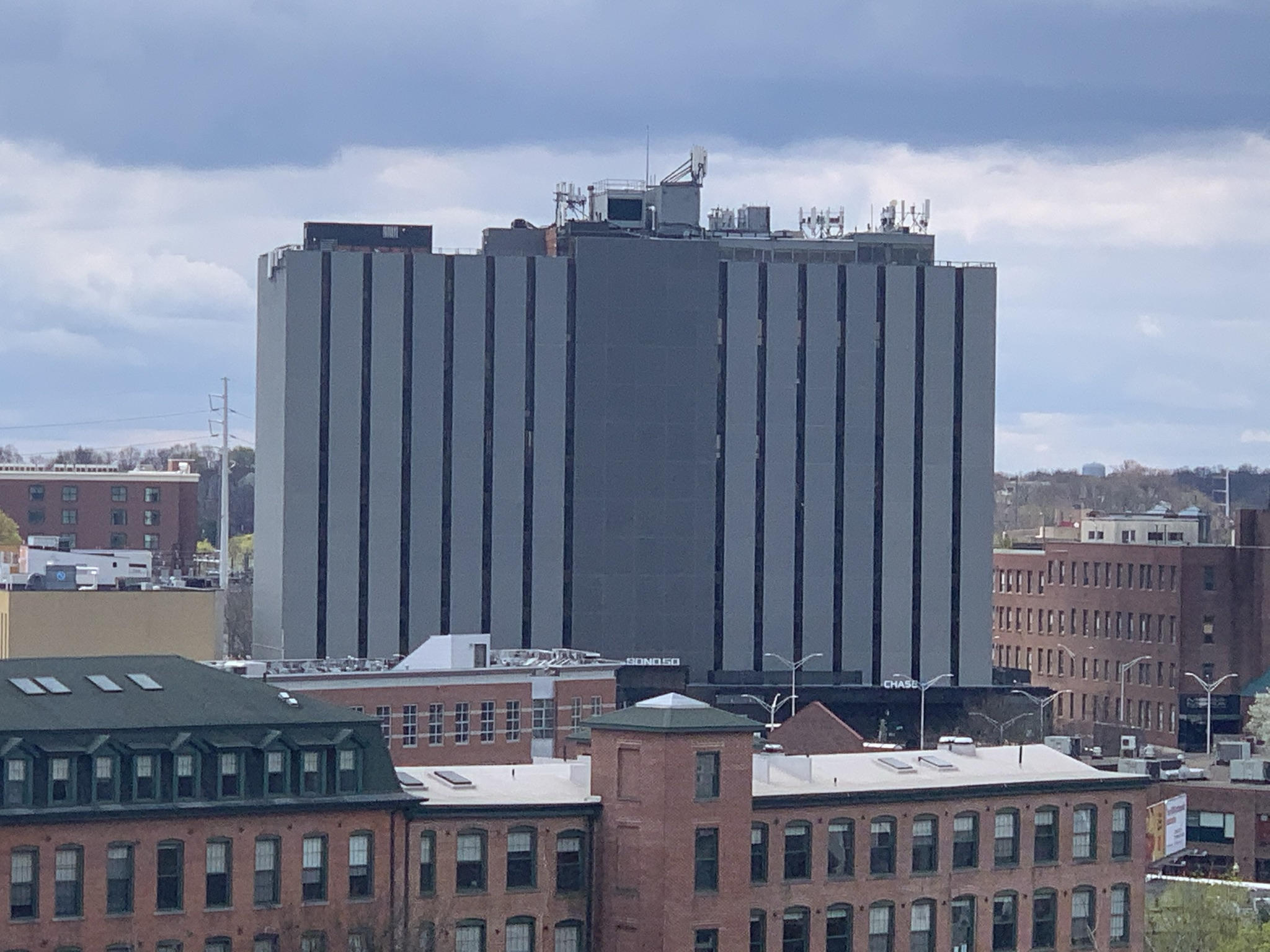
SONO 50, located in South Norwalk, is the tallest building in the city
Historical

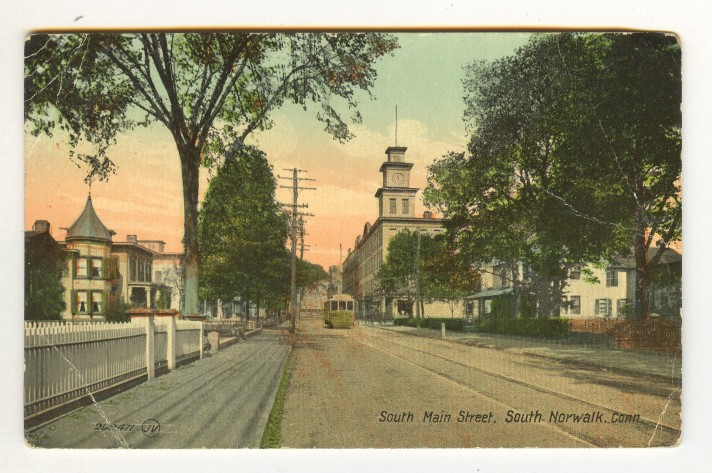
South Main Street 1919

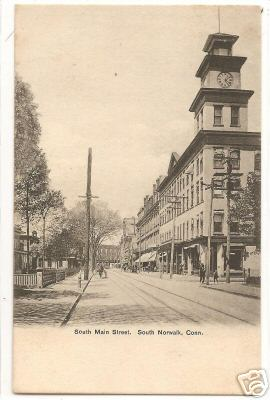
South Main Street 1887

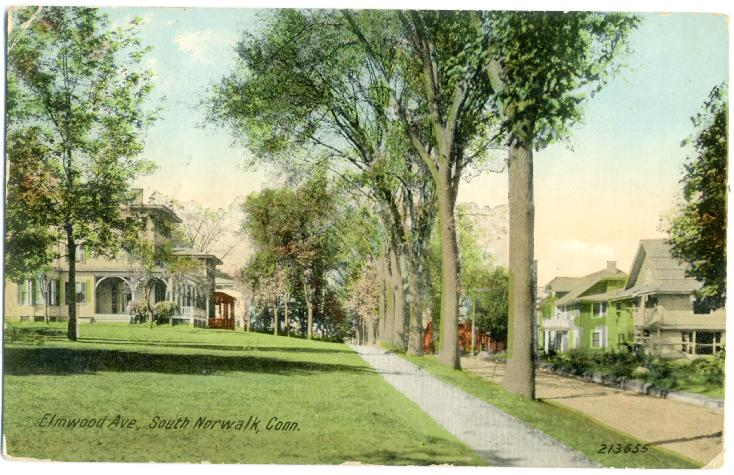
Elmwood Avenue 1912

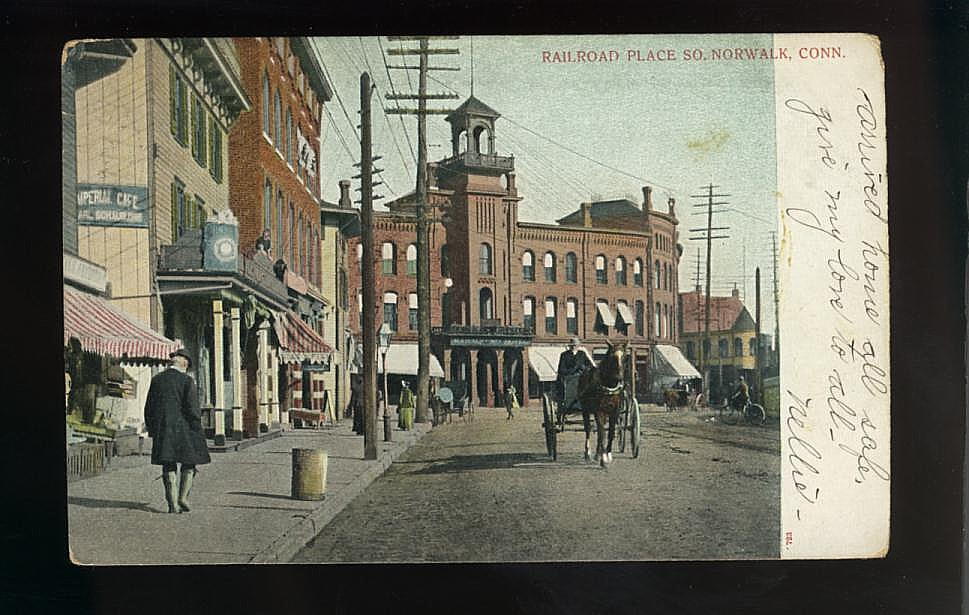
Railroad Place 1909

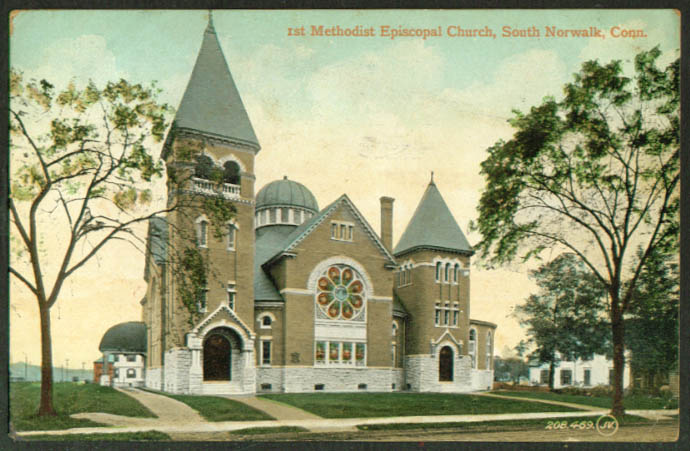
First United Methodist Church, West Avenue, 1922

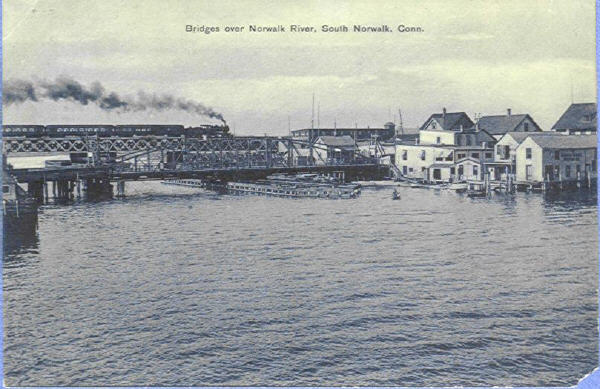
Norwalk River Bridge c. 1914
