= Ebenezer J. Hill =

American politician (1845–1917)

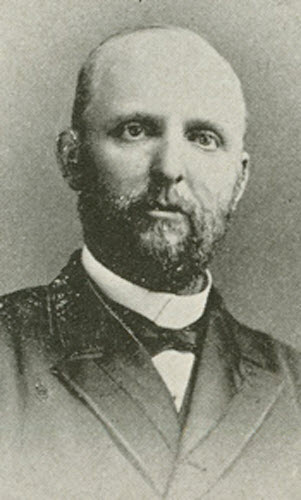

Member of the U.S. House of Representatives from Connecticut's 4th district
- In office March 4, 1915 – September 27, 1917
- Preceded by: Jeremiah Donovan
- Succeeded by: Schuyler Merritt
- In office March 4, 1895 – March 3, 1913
- Preceded by: Robert E. De Forest
- Succeeded by: Jeremiah Donovan

Member of the Connecticut Senate from the 13th district
- In office 1886–1887
- Preceded by: Asa Smith
- Succeeded by: Lyman S. Catlin

Member of the Connecticut House of Representatives
- In office 1866–1867
- Preceded by: Chester Tolles, F. St. John Lockwood
- Succeeded by: Asa Woodward, D. H. Webb
- In office 1862–1863
- Preceded by: Josiah Carter, Peter L. Cunningham
- Succeeded by: William C. Street, Joseph H Cummings
- In office 1851–1854
- Preceded by: Clark Bissell, Algernon Beard

Personal details
- Born: August 4, 1845 Redding, Connecticut
- Died: September 27, 1917 (aged 72) Norwalk, Connecticut
- Resting place: Riverside Cemetery, Norwalk, Connecticut
- Party: Republican
- Spouse: Mary Ellen Mosman (1846–1918)
- Children: Frederick Asbury Hill (1869–1907), Clara Mossman Hill (1874–1955), Helena Charlotte Hill Weed (1875–1958), Elsie Mary Hill (1883–1970)
- Education: Center Academy; Yale College
- Occupation: banker, businessman

Military service
- Allegiance: United States Union
- Branch/service: Union Army
- Years of service: 1863–1865
- Battles/wars: Civil War

Ebenezer J. Hill (August 4, 1845 – September 27, 1917) was an American politician who served as a member of the United States House of Representatives from Connecticut's 4th congressional district from 1895 to 1913 and from 1915 until his death in 1917. He had previously served as a member of the Connecticut State Senate from 1886 to 1887.

== Early life ==
Hill was born on August 4, 1845, in Redding, Connecticut, to Reverend Moses Hill and Charlotte Ilsley McLellan. He attended the public schools and then the Center Academy. In 1863, during the Civil War, Hill enlisted in the Union Army, as an assistant to his brother, a Major, in the Quartermaster Department, and served until the end of the war. After the war, he attended Yale College from 1865 to 1866, but did not earn a degree. However, Hill earned an honorary degree from Yale in 1895.

== Political career ==
Hill engaged in business and banking in Norwalk. He served as a Burgess of Norwalk and as chairman of the board of school visitors. In 1884, Hill served as a delegate to the Republican National Convention. Hill was elected as member of the Connecticut State Senate in 1886, serving only one term. He also served one term on the Republican State central committee.

In 1894, Hill was elected as a Republican to the 54th United States Congress, and to the eight succeeding Congresses (March 4, 1895 – March 3, 1913). As a member of Congress, Hill served as a member of the Committee on Banking and Currency for 8 years, and as a member of the Ways and Means Committee for 14 years. He served as chairman of the Committee on Expenditures in the Department of the Treasury (61st Congress). During his time in Congress, he developed a reputation among his colleagues as an authority on banking and tariffs. Hill was seen as a proponent of the gold standard, a protectionist, and as an outspoken supporter of women's suffrage. He was one of 14 representatives, all Republicans, to oppose the Sixteenth Amendment to the United States Constitution, which imposed a federal income tax.

He was an unsuccessful candidate in 1912 for reelection to the 63rd Congress.

Hill was again elected to the 64th and 65th Congresses and served from March 4, 1915, until his death in Norwalk, Connecticut, on September 27, 1917. He was interred in Riverside Cemetery in Norwalk, Connecticut.

== See also ==
- List of members of the United States Congress who died in office (1900–1949)

== Sources ==
- United States Congress. "Ebenezer J. Hill (id: H000591)". Biographical Directory of the United States Congress.
- Ebenezer J. Hill, late a representative from Connecticut, Memorial addresses delivered in the House of Representatives and Senate frontispiece 1919

U.S. House of Representatives
Preceded by Jeremiah Donovan	Member of the U.S. House of Representatives from Connecticut's 4th congressional district 1915 – 1917	Succeeded by Schuyler Merritt
Preceded by Robert E. De Forest	Member of the U.S. House of Representatives from Connecticut's 4th congressional district 1895 – 1913	Succeeded by Jeremiah Donovan
Connecticut State Senate
Preceded by Asa Smith	Member of the Connecticut Senate from the 13th District; 1886–1887	Succeeded by Lyman S. Catlin
Connecticut House of Representatives
Preceded by Chester Tolles; F. St. John Lockwood	Member of the Connecticut House of Representatives from Norwalk; 1866–1867; With: F. St. John Lockwood	Succeeded by Asa Woodward; D. H. Webb
Preceded by Josiah Carter; Peter L. Cunningham	Member of the Connecticut House of Representatives from Norwalk; 1862–1863; With: Josiah Carter	Succeeded by William C. Street; Joseph H Cummings
Preceded by Clark Bissell; Algernon Beard	Member of the Connecticut House of Representatives from Norwalk; 1851–1854; With: Ira Gregory	Succeeded by.
