= James G. Gregory =

American politician

James Glynn Gregory
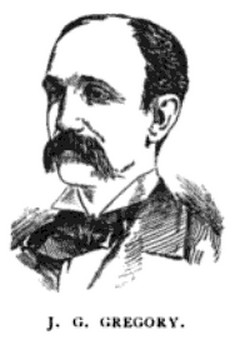

30th Warden of the Borough of Norwalk, Connecticut
- In office 1888–1889
- Preceded by: George S. Gregory
- Succeeded by: Clarence B. Coolidge

Member of the Connecticut House of Representatives from Norwalk
- In office 1879–1880 Serving with Robert Rowen
- Preceded by: Edward P. Weed, Allen Betts
- Succeeded by: Robert Rowen, Charles H. Street

Personal details
- Born: May 12, 1843 Norwalk, Connecticut, US
- Died: February 1, 1932 (aged 88) Norwalk, Connecticut, US
- Party: Republican
- Spouse: Jeannette Lindsley Pinneo Gregory
- Children: Edward Ward Slosson Gregory, M. D., Jeanette L Gregory, Alyse E Gregory
- Education: Yale College (1865), New York College of Physicians and Surgeons
- Occupation: physician

James Glynn Gregory (May 12, 1843 – February 1, 1932) was Surgeon General of Connecticut from 1881 to 1882. He served as Warden of the Borough of Norwalk, Connecticut, from 1888 to 1889, and as a member of the Connecticut House of Representatives in 1879.

He was born in Norwalk, Connecticut, on May 12, 1843, the son of Ira Gregory and Frances Augusta Gregory. He was the fourth great-grandson of John Gregory, one of the founding settlers of Norwalk. His daughter was American suffragette Alyse Gregory.

He graduated from Yale in 1865. He then went to the New York College of Physicians and Surgeons. He worked for two years at the Brooklyn City Hospital.

In 1870, he returned to Norwalk. He was elected to the Connecticut House of Representatives in 1879. He was surgeon general of Connecticut from 1881 to 1882. He served as a burgess of the Borough of Norwalk, and as warden from 1888 to 1889.

Preceded by Edward P. Weed; Allen Betts	Member of the Connecticut House of Representatives from Norwalk; 1879–1880; With: Robert Rowen	Succeeded by Robert Rowen; Charles H. Street
Preceded by George S. Gregory	Warden of the Borough of Norwalk, Connecticut; 1888–1889	Succeeded by Clarence B. Coolidge
