= Albert Pohlman =

American physician

Albert Martin Pohlman

27th Mayor of South Norwalk, Connecticut
- In office 1910–1911
- Preceded by: Robert M. Wolfe
- Succeeded by: William Tammany

Personal details
- Born: ca. 1868
- Party: Democratic; Republican
- Spouse: Anna Bach Pohlman
- Children: Blanche, Bessie Iris
- Occupation: physician

Albert Martin Pohlman (born c. 1868) was a one-term Republican mayor of South Norwalk, Connecticut, from 1910 to 1911.

He was the son of Fred and Louisa Pohlman, German immigrants.

In 1925, Pohlman ran against the incumbent Republican mayor of Norwalk, Thomas Robins, but was defeated.

From 1933 to 1935, Pohlman was president of the Norwalk Common Council. During the term of fellow Democratic mayor Charles C. Swartz, he had a break with the local Democrats. In 1935, he sought the party nomination for mayor, but the nomination went to Frank T. Stack. He formed the People's Party with former South Norwalk mayor Robert M. Wolfe as his campaign manager. He lost to Stack in a four-way race.

Preceded by Robert M. Wolfe	Mayor of South Norwalk, Connecticut; 1910–1911	Succeeded by William Tammany
