= Senator Keeler =

Senator Keeler may refer to:

- Anson F. Keeler (1887–1943), Connecticut State Senate
- Edwin O. Keeler (1846–1923), Connecticut State Senate
