= Robert M. Wolfe =

American mayor

Robert Milton Wolfe

26th and 29th Mayor of South Norwalk, Connecticut
- In office 1909–1910
- Preceded by: Francis Burnell
- Succeeded by: Albert M. Pohlman
- In office 1912–1913
- Preceded by: William F. Tammany
- Succeeded by: position abolished

Personal details
- Died: 1940 Syracuse, New York
- Party: Democratic
- Children: Robert Milton Wolfe, Jr.
- Occupation: physician

Robert Milton Wolfe, Sr. (died 1940) was a Democratic mayor of South Norwalk, Connecticut from 1909 to 1910 and from 1912 to 1913. He was the last mayor of South Norwalk. The city consolidated with the city of Norwalk, in 1913. He was an original member of the board of incorporators of the city of Norwalk.

In 1925, he served as Norwalk's Acting Mayor.

In 1935, former South Norwalk mayor Albert Pohlman, broke from the local Democratic party, formed the People's Party and ran for mayor of Norwalk. Wolfe served as Pohlman's campaign manager, but Pohlman was defeated by Frank T. Stack in a four-way race.

Preceded by William F. Tammany	Mayor of South Norwalk, Connecticut; 1912–1913	Succeeded by City consolidated, position abolished
Preceded by Francis Burnell	Mayor of South Norwalk, Connecticut; 1909–1910	Succeeded by Albert M. Pohlman
