= Fanniebelle Curtis =

American educator (1867–1943)

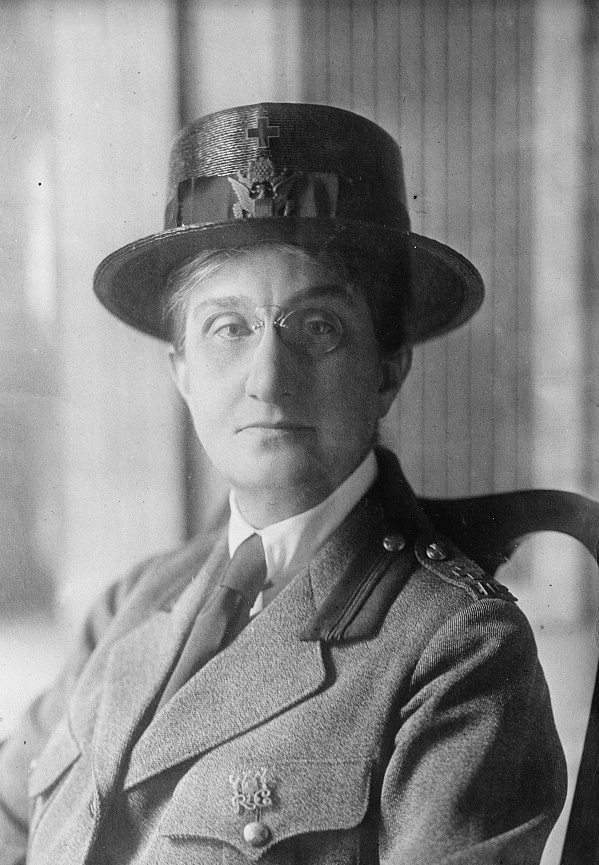
- Fanniebelle Curtis in 1919, from the American National Red Cross photograph collection, Library of Congress
- Born: Fannie Isabella Curtis; November 28, 1867; Norwalk, Connecticut
- Died: November 14, 1943; Norwalk, Connecticut
- Other names: Fannibelle Curtis, Fannie Bell Curtis
- Occupation: Educator
- Relatives: Stiles Curtis (grandfather)

Fanniebelle Curtis (November 28, 1867 – November 14, 1943), born Fannie Isabella Curtis, was an American educator. She was kindergarten director of New York City, and head of the Kindergarten Unit of the American Red Cross during World War I.

== Early life and education ==
Curtis was born in Norwalk, Connecticut, the daughter of David Seymour Curtis and Cornelia Isabelle Raymond Curtis. Her father was commissioner of streets and sewers in Norwalk. Her grandfather was Stiles Curtis, a politician and bank president. Her older brother Frederick Stiles Curtis and his family served as Presbyterian missionaries in Japan, Korea, and China. She trained as a teacher at the Connecticut State Normal School in New Britain, with further studies in New York with Jerome Allen.

== Career ==
=== New England ===
In 1884, Curtis assisted Clara W. Mingins in opening the first kindergarten in Connecticut, in New Britain, then headed the kindergarten at the state normal school in Willimantic for three years. She was president of the Connecticut Valley Kindergarten Association. She was director of kindergartens in Newton, Massachusetts from 1893 to 1894, then taught at the normal school in New Britain. In summer 1895 she ran the special kindergarten department at Norwich.

=== New York ===
Curtis was director of kindergartens in Brooklyn, New York from 1897 to 1912. She was vice-president of the Brooklyn Kindergarten Union. "Under her enterprising hand several practical helps have found their way into the city kindergartens, such as the Brooklyn Sand Table Blocks," according to an 1899 report. She served on the executive committee of the Department of Pedagogy at the Brooklyn Institute of Arts and Sciences, and chaired its kindergarten committee.

She became kindergarten director of the New York City Board of Education in 1912. She established a kindergarten summer camp in Coney Island, "so that mothers and babies might have frequent days at the seashore and the satisfaction of a cool quiet place." Under her leadership, the city schools encouraged professional training for kindergarten teachers, and expanded the kindergarten offerings to include a specially-equipped classroom for blind children.

Curtis retired from the New York City school system in 1921. She was succeeded as Director of Kindergartens by her assistant, Luella A. Palmer.

=== World War I ===
Curtis took a leave of absence to head of the Kindergarten Unit of the American Red Cross during and after World War I. She helped establish kindergartens and playgrounds, and teacher training programs, especially for the "bewildered and benumbed" children of postwar France. She made appeals to American teachers for materials to use in French kindergartens. She also lectured on the unit's work for the International Kindergarten Union. "It is a tragedy that has no parallel in the world's history," she explained. "Every foreign mail brings more pitiful stories. It is childhood's darkest hour."

After the war, she wrote and spoke about the ongoing work of American educators in France. In 1925, Curtis presented a film about the reconstruction work in France at meetings of the Women's Overseas Service League in various American cities. She returned to France in 1926, to help lay the cornerstone of the Maison de Tous, a community house in Lievin.

== Publications ==
- "The Kindergarten Unit in France" (1918)
- "An Appeal for the Children of France" (1918)
- "The Final Work of Our Kindergarten Unit in France: The Building of the Maison de Tous" (1926)
- "Address of the Director of the Kindergarten Unit of France" (1928)
- "The International Bureau of Education" (1929)

== Personal life ==
Curtis died in 1934, at the age of 75, at her home in South Norwalk.
