= Kimmey =

Kimmey is a surname of Scottish origin. Notable people with the surname include:

- Andrea Kimmey-Baca, American singer
- Danielle Kimmey (born 1982), American singer
- John D. Kimmey (1828–?), American politician
- Lisa Kimmey, American singer

== See also ==
- Kimmey Raschke, Puerto Rican politician
