= Tom Morrison =

Thomas, Tom and Tommy Morrison may refer to:

== Politics ==
- Thomas David Morrison (1796–1856), Canadian doctor and politician
- Thomas Fletcher Morrison (1808–1886), sailor, farmer and political figure in Nova Scotia, Canada
- Thomas H. Morison (1838–1884), warden of the Borough of Norwalk, Connecticut
- Thomas Morison, Lord Morison (1868–1945), Scottish politician and judge
- Tom Morrison (Illinois politician) (born 1975), Illinois state legislator
- Tom Morrison (British politician) (elected 2024), British Member of Parliament
- Tommy Morrison (politician) (born 1975), Guam legislator

== Sports ==
- Tom Morrison (baseball) (1869–1902), American baseball player
- Tommy Morrison (footballer, born 1874) (1874–1940), Irish footballer
- Tommy Morrison (footballer, born 1943), Scottish footballer
- Tom Morrison (footballer) (1904–1973), Scottish footballer
- Tom Morrison (rugby union) (1913–1985), New Zealand rugby union player and administrator
- Tommy Morrison (1969–2013), American boxer
- Tommy Morrison (golfer) (born 2004), American golfer

== Other ==
- Thomas Morison (physician) (1558?–1603?), Scottish physician and diplomat
- Thomas Morrison (actor) (born 1983), English television actor

== See also ==
- Thomas Moryson (died 1592), MP
