= Frank J. Cooke =

American politician

30th Mayor of Norwalk, Connecticut
- In office 1961 – 1965; 2 terms
- Preceded by: John Shostak
- Succeeded by: Frank Zullo

Personal details
- Born: 1922
- Died: 1996 (aged 73–74) Norwalk, Connecticut
- Party: Republican
- Spouse: Carolyn Spear Cooke
- Children: Christopher Hamel Cooke, Jefferey Cooke, Claudia Star Cooke, Sarah Spear Cooke

Frank J. Cooke (c. 1922 – c. 1996) was a two-term Republican mayor of Norwalk, Connecticut from 1961 to 1965. He had previously served as a two-term member and president of Norwalk's Common Council. Cooke was an engineer by profession and founded Cooke Vacuum Products in 1959. He operated it as an electronics manufacturer and research and development contractor until 1994.

== Early life ==
He was a veteran of World War II, serving as a member of the Fourth Marine Division in the 4th Air Wing.

== Mayoral administration ==
In 1961, Cooke ran against Irving Freese and William O. Morrow in a three-way race for mayor. During his administration a Charter Revision Commission was appointed to make recommendations on the Norwalk Charter. He reactivated the Mayor's Committee on Intergroup Relations, which had originally been formed in 1960 to deal with local interracial problems. He won in a very close four-way race for his second term, narrowly beating Donald Irwin. He did not seek a third term.

== Post mayoral career ==
In March 1965, his company F.J. Cooke Inc. was put into involuntary bankruptcy. He formed a new company, Cooke Vacuum Products, Inc., which he opened in space rented from the Hat Corporation of America.

In March, 1988, he was appointed chairman of Norwalk Bank. He served as its chairman for two years.

In 1994, Cooke sold Cooke Vacuum Products to Richard Stein.

Preceded by John Shostak	Mayor of Norwalk, Connecticut; 1961–1965	Succeeded by Frank Zullo
