= Charles Swartz =

Charles Swartz may refer to:

- Charles C. Swartz (1875–1947), Connecticut State Comptroller and mayor of Norwalk, Connecticut
- Charles S. Swartz (1939–2007), American filmmaker, researcher and academic
