= Edwin Adams =

Edwin Adams may refer to:

- Edwin Adams (actor) (1834–1877), American stage actor
- Edwin Adams (politician) (1829–1908), mayor of Norwalk, Connecticut
- Edwin Plimpton Adams (1878–1956), American physicist
