= James Hubbell =

James Hubbell may refer to:

- James Randolph Hubbell (1824–1890), U.S. Representative from Ohio
- James T. Hubbell (1855–1929), mayor of Norwalk, Connecticut
- James Hubbell (artist) (born 1931), American artist and architect
