= Charles Dow (disambiguation) =

Charles Dow (1851–1902), American journalist who co-founded Dow Jones & Company.

Charles Dow may also refer to:

- Charles E. Dow (1846–1919), American politician from Connecticut
- Chuck Dow (Charles G. Dow Sr., 1931–2015), American politician from Maine
- Charles W. Dow (died 1855), the first European murder victim in Kansas
