= Zullo =

Zullo is a surname. Notable people with the surname include:

- Albertine Zullo (born 1967), Swiss illustrator
- Allan Zullo, American author
- Chrissie Zullo, Canadian comic book artist
- Frank Zullo (1932–2018), American politician from Connecticut
- Lindsay Zullo (born 1991), Haitian footballer
- Michael Zullo (born 1988), Australian footballer
