= Rilling =

Surname list

Rilling is a surname. Notable people with the surname include:

- Harry Rilling (born 1947), American politician and police chief
- Helmuth Rilling (1933–2026), German choral conductor and academic teacher
