= William H. Smith =

William H. Smith may refer to:

- William H. Smith (boxer) (1904–1955), South African boxer of the 1920s
- William H. Smith (Medal of Honor) (1847–1877), Medal of Honor recipient
- William H. Smith (Connecticut politician) (1842–1915), warden of the Borough of Norwalk, Connecticut
- William Hugh Smith (1826–1899), Governor of Alabama
- William Henry Smith (1792–1865), founder of the WHSmith chain of newsagents
- William Henry Smith (1825–1891), son of the founder of WHSmith, businessman and politician
- William Henry Smith (American politician) (1833–1896), newspaper editor and Republican politician in Ohio
- William Henry Smith (Canadian politician) (1826–1890), lawyer and political figure in Nova Scotia, Canada

== See also ==
- William Smith (disambiguation)
