= Frank Stack (disambiguation) =

Frank Stack (born 1937) is an American underground cartoonist.

Frank Stack may also refer to:

- Frank T. Stack (1891–1956), mayor of Norwalk, Connecticut, 1935–1943
- Frank Stack (speed skater) (1906–1987), Canadian speed skater and Olympic medalist
