= Arthur Wheeler =

Arthur Wheeler may refer to:

- Arthur C. Wheeler (1856–1941), mayor of Norwalk, Connecticut (1895–1897)
- Arthur Oliver Wheeler (1860–1945), co-founder of the Alpine Club of Canada
- Sir Arthur Wheeler, 1st Baronet (1860–1943), English stockbroker and financier
- Arthur Wheeler (motorcyclist) (1916–2001), British Grand Prix motorcycle racer
- Art Wheeler (1872–1917), American football player
