= Daskam =

Daskam is a surname. Notable people with the surname include:

- Josephine Daskam Bacon (1876–1961), American writer
- Samuel Daskam (1823–1912), American politician
