= Disbrow =

Disbrow is a surname. Notable people with the surname include:

- Charles E. Disbrow (1812–1853), American politician
- James Disbrow (1948–2002), American restaurateur and figure skating official
- Lisa Disbrow (born 1962), American Air Force officer
- Louis Disbrow (1876–1939), American racecar driver
