= Edward P. Weed =

American politician (1834–1880)

15th and 22nd Warden of the Borough of Norwalk, Connecticut
- In office 1867–1868
- Preceded by: Edwin Lockwood
- Succeeded by: Harvey Fitch
- In office 1874–1874
- Preceded by: Asa Smith
- Succeeded by: Samuel Daskam

Member of the Connecticut House of Representatives from Norwalk
- In office 1874–1875 Serving with Thomas Guyer
- Preceded by: Moses Hill, Thomas Guyer
- Succeeded by: James W. Hyatt, Winfield S. Hanford
- In office 1878–1879 Serving with Allen Betts
- Preceded by: Allen Betts, Talmadge Baker
- Succeeded by: Robert Rowen, Charles H. Street

Personal details
- Born: April 7, 1834 Norwalk, Connecticut
- Died: April 18, 1880 (aged 46) Norwalk, Connecticut
- Party: Democratic
- Spouse(s): Sophia A. Lynes (b. 1839, m. December 29, 1865, d. August 10, 1914) She was the daughter of Samuel Lynes and Elizabeth Hoyt Isaacs and grand-daughter of Benjamin Isaacs
- Children: Samuel Lynes Weed (b: 1868), Edward Payson Chichester Weed (b. 1872)

Edward P. Weed (April 7, 1834 – April 18, 1880) was Warden of the Borough of Norwalk, Connecticut from 1867 to 1868, and in 1874 until his resignation. He also served as a member of the Connecticut House of Representatives from Norwalk in the sessions of 1874, and 1878.

He was born in Norwalk on April 7, 1834, the son of John Adams Weed and Emeline Chichester.

Preceded by Edwin Lockwood	Warden of the Borough of Norwalk, Connecticut; 1867–1868	Succeeded by Harvey Fitch
Preceded by Asa Smith	Warden of the Borough of Norwalk, Connecticut; 1874	Succeeded by Samuel Daskam
Preceded by Moses Hill; Thomas Guyer	Member of the Connecticut House of Representatives from Norwalk; 1874–1875; With: Thomas Guyer	Succeeded by James W. Hyatt; Winfield S. Hanford
Preceded by Allen Betts; Talmadge Baker	Member of the Connecticut House of Representatives from Norwalk; 1878–1879; With: Allen Betts	Succeeded by Robert Rowen; Charles H. Street
