= Edwin Lockwood =

American politician

14th and 17th Warden of the Borough of Norwalk, Connecticut
- In office 1865–1867
- Preceded by: Asa Smith
- Succeeded by: Edward P. Weed
- In office 1869–1870
- Preceded by: Harvey Fitch
- Succeeded by: Asa Smith

Personal details
- Born: September 8, 1799 Norwalk, Connecticut
- Died: October 14, 1878 (aged 79) Norwalk, Connecticut
- Resting place: Mill Hill Burying Ground, Norwalk, Connecticut
- Spouse(s): Emily Ives Lockwood (m. October 10, 1829, d. 1830), Emily Olmstead Lockwood (m. August 2, 1832)
- Children: Emily Ives Lockwood, Elizabeth Augusta Lockwood, Edwin Fitch Lockwood, Eliza Jane Lockwood, Ebenezer Lockwood, Charles Edwin Lockwood, Ellen Elizabeth Lockwood, Elvira Lockwood

Edwin Lockwood (September 8, 1799 – October 14, 1878) was Warden of the Borough of Norwalk, Connecticut from 1865 to 1867 and from 1869 to 1870.

== Early life and family ==
He was born in Norwalk on September 8, 1799, the son of Ebenezer and Mary Godfrey Lockwoood.

He married twice, first to Emily Ives Lockwood on October 10, 1829, but she died in 1830. Together they had one daughter Emily, who died before twelve years of age. He next married Emily Olmstead on August 2, 1832. Together they had seven children. However, only one lived to adulthood.

He was the uncle of LeGrand Lockwood.

== Career ==
In 1862, he founded the Norwalk Horse Railway Company and served as its president.

Preceded by Asa Smith	Warden of the Borough of Norwalk, Connecticut; 1865–1867	Succeeded by Edward P. Weed
Preceded by Harvey Fitch	Warden of the Borough of Norwalk, Connecticut; 1869–1870	Succeeded by Asa Smith
