= George R. Cholwell =

American politician

George Ring Cholwell

12th Warden of the Borough of Norwalk, Connecticut
- In office 1861–1863
- Preceded by: William C. Street
- Succeeded by: Asa Smith

Personal details
- Born: December 1, 1820 Norwalk, Connecticut
- Died: April 10, 1883 (aged 62) Norwalk, Connecticut
- Party: Democratic
- Spouse: Mary Eliza Street (m. August 5, 1843)
- Children: Sarah Ester Cholwell, Clementine Cholwell, George R. Cholwell, Mary Eliza (Street) Cholwell, Alice Lorraine Cholwell,
- Occupation: Merchant of fine goods (pocket books, card cases, stationery, etc.)

George Ring Cholwell (December 1, 1820 – April 10, 1883) was Warden of the Borough of Norwalk, Connecticut from 1861 to 1863.

He was born in Norwalk, on December 1, 1820, the son of James Cholwell and Anna Maria Ring.

He was clerk of the Board of Underwriters in New York City.

Preceded by William C. Street	Warden of the Borough of Norwalk, Connecticut; 1861–1863	Succeeded by Asa Smith
