= Peter L. Cunningham =

American politician (1814–1899)

9th Mayor of South Norwalk, Connecticut
- In office 1883–1884
- Preceded by: Christian Swartz
- Succeeded by: Richard H. Golden

Member of the Connecticut House of Representatives from Norwalk
- In office 1861–1862
- Preceded by: William T. Craw, Samuel Olmstead
- Succeeded by: Josiah Carter, Ebenezer J. Hill

Personal details
- Born: August 15, 1814 New York City
- Died: April 22, 1899 (aged 84) Norwalk Hospital; Norwalk, Connecticut
- Party: Republican
- Spouse: Amelia Chichester
- Children: Mary

Military service
- Rank: Lieutenant Colonel
- Unit: 8th Regiment Connecticut Volunteers
- Battles/wars: American Civil War

Peter L. Cunningham (August 14, 1814 – April 22, 1899) was a one-term mayor of South Norwalk, Connecticut in 1883.

He was born in New York City on August 14, 1814. He came to Old Well (now South Norwalk), Connecticut in the spring of 1834.

In 1840, he organized the First Rifle Company (known as the Mohican Rifle Corps) of the Ninth Regiment, Fourth Brigade, C.S.S. He was its commander for several years.

In 1858, he was appointed colonel on the staff of Governor William A.Buckingham.

In 1861, he was appointed Lieutenant Colonel of the Eighth Connecticut Volunteers, but resigned the commission after four months with an honorable discharge. In that same year, he was elected to the Connecticut House of Representatives from Norwalk. He was a member of the Military Committee of the Legislature of Connecticut. In that committee, he proposed that $3 million should be appropriated for the defense of the Union. That proposal was passed by both chambers of the legislature. Another $3 million would subsequently be approved.

From 1877 to 1879, Cunningham served on the South Norwalk City Council as its senior member. He served as mayor from 1883 to 1884.

He served as a director on the boards of the Central Nation Bank, the First National Bank, and the Norwalk Gas Company.

== Associations ==
- Member (May 11, 1843), Noble Grand (January 1843); Independent Order of Odd Fellows, Our Brothers Lodge, No. 10
- Charter Member (September 17, 1845), Kalosa Encampment
- Grand Patriarch of the State of Connecticut (1853, 1854)
- Grand Representative to the Grand Lodge of the United States, held at Baltimore, Md. (1854 and 1855)
- Grand Master of the State of Connecticut (1869, 1870)
- Grand Representative to the United States Grand Lodge held at Chicago and Baltimore (1870, 1871)
- Member, St. John’s Lodge, No. 6 of Free and Accepted Masons, Norwalk. (April 29, 1847)
- Member, Clinton Commandery, Norwalk (February 11, 1853)
- Royal Arch Mason
- Knights Templar

== Death ==
On April 22, 1899, Cunningham died suddenly while vising the Norwalk Hospital to view the building under construction. He fell while walking down a decline at the back of the building, and died shortly thereafter. The cause of death was believed to be apoplexy.

Preceded by Christian Swartz	Mayor of South Norwalk, Connecticut; 1883–1884	Succeeded by Richard H. Golden
Preceded by William T. Craw; Samuel Olmstead	Member of the Connecticut House of Representatives from Norwalk; 1861; With: Josiah Carter	Succeeded by Josiah Carter; Ebenezer J. Hill
