= George Brunjes =

American politician (1889–1968)

George R. Brunjes

27th Mayor of Norwalk, Connecticut
- In office 1955–1957
- Preceded by: Irving Freese
- Succeeded by: Irving Freese

Personal details
- Born: April 24, 1889 Brooklyn, New York
- Died: December 1, 1968 (aged 79) Norwalk, Connecticut
- Party: Democratic
- Spouse: Dorothy Burr
- Children: 4

George R. Brunjes (April 24, 1889 – December 1, 1968) was a Democratic one term mayor of Norwalk, Connecticut, USA from 1955 to 1957 and principal of Franklin Junior High School.

== Political career ==
In 1955, Brunjes ran for mayor against the three-term incumbent mayor, Irving Freese, and the previous Republican candidate Stanley Stroffolino who was running under the Independent Taxpayers Party. Brunjes beat Stroffolino by 2,157 votes.

He lost his re-election attempt in 1957 to Freese. After his term, he served on the City Hall Building Committee. He died at a convalescent home in Norwalk in 1968.

Preceded by Irving Freese	Mayor of Norwalk, Connecticut; 1955–1957	Succeeded by Irving Freese
