= Frederick M. Salmon =

American politician (1870–1936)

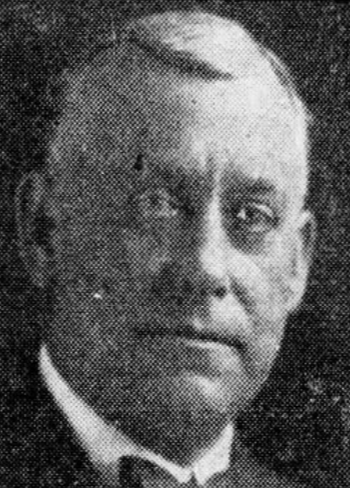

Connecticut State Comptroller
- In office 1923–1933
- Governor: Charles A. Templeton; Hiram Bingham III; John H. Trumbull
- Preceded by: Harvey P. Bissell
- Succeeded by: Anson F. Keeler

Personal details
- Born: February 27, 1870 Westport, Connecticut, US
- Died: January 28, 1936 (aged 65) Jacksonville, Florida, US
- Party: Republican
- Occupation: Politician

Frederick Morehouse Salmon (February 27, 1870 – January 28, 1936) was an American politician and businessman who served five consecutive terms as Connecticut State Comptroller from 1923 to 1933. A Republican from Westport, Connecticut, Salmon also represented the 25th District in the Connecticut State Senate from 1915 to 1919.

== Life and career ==
Born in Westport in 1870, Salmon was educated in the town's public schools and took college business courses before taking over his father's dry goods business in 1894. He was a long-time trustee of the Westport Library and the Westport Bank and Trust Company, treasurer of Fairfield County for six years, registrar of voters in Westport for 21 years, and secretary of the board of directors of the state prison system. He was described as "one of Westport's most prominent citizens."

Salmon died of pneumonia in Jacksonville, Florida, at the age of 65. He was interred at Willowbrook Cemetery.
