= Clara W. Mingins =

American educator (1859–1917)

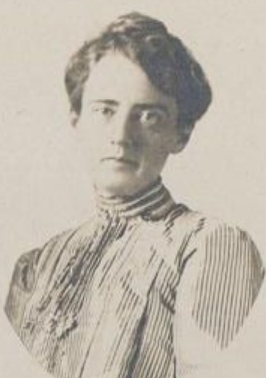
- Clara W. Mingins on the faculty of Alma College, from a 1906 photograph
- Born: September 29, 1859; Pennsylvania, U.S.
- Died: November 5, 1917 (aged 58); Grand Rapids, Michigan, U.S.
- Occupation: Educator

Clara Wood Mingins (September 29, 1859 – November 5, 1917) was an American educator. She opened the first kindergarten in Connecticut in 1884, and was later head of the kindergarten programs in Detroit, Michigan.

== Early life and education ==
Mingins was born in Pennsylvania, the daughter of George James Mingins and Elizabeth Gray Wood Mingins. Her father was a Presbyterian minister, born in Scotland. She trained as a kindergarten teacher in New York City.

== Career ==
Mingins opened Connecticut's first kindergarten class, at the State Normal School in New Britain in 1884, with assistance from Fanniebelle Curtis. She was director of kindergartens in Newton, Massachusetts in the mid-1890s. She moved to Detroit in 1896, to become the superintendent of public kindergartens and principal of the kindergarten training department at Washington Normal School. She is said to have founded over 40 kindergartens in the Detroit area. She was vice-president of the kindergarten education department, and a member of the child study department, of the National Education Association. She was president of the Detroit branch of the International Kindergarten Union.

With her partner Eleanor O. Periam, Mingins resigned from the Detroit Public Schools in 1903. Both women joined the faculty at Alma College, a Presbyterian college in Michigan. Both survived the Iroquois Theatre fire in Chicago in 1904, along with Mingins' niece Mildred, and Periam's niece, Grace Dymond.

Later in her career, Mingins taught at the normal school in Ypsilanti, Michigan. She was often invited to write essays and speak to community groups and professional organizations on education and child development topics. Her lecture "The Child and the Law" was published as a pamphlet in 1910. In 1911, she gave an address to the State Federation of Women's Clubs when they met in Detroit, saying in part, "We have made too great difference in sex, and we hem the girl about with restrictions that fret and hamper her, and give too little consideration to the protection of the boy, who is just as impressionable as the girl." She also wrote a novel, A New Note in the Christmas Carol (1913), which was serialized in newspapers before it was published in book form.

== Publications ==
- The Child and the Law (1910, pamphlet)
- A New Note in the Christmas Carol (1913, novel)

== Personal life ==
Mingins lived, worked, and traveled with fellow kindergarten teacher Eleanor Olive Periam. Mingins's niece Mildred and Periam's niece Grace Dymond also lived in the household. Mingins died in 1917, in Grand Rapids, Michigan, from meningitis, at the age of 58.
