= Ridgebury Congregational Church =

Historic church in Connecticut, United States

- U.S. National Register of Historic Places
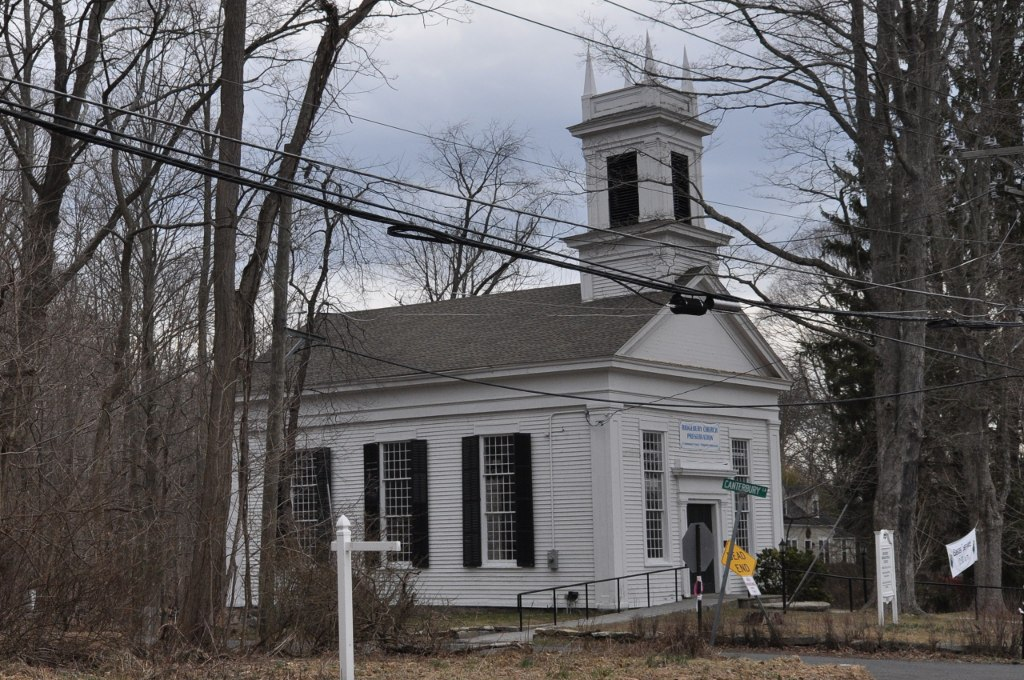

- Location within Connecticut Location within the United States
- Location: Ridgebury Road and George Washington Highway, Ridgefield, Connecticut
- Coordinates: 41°21′38″N 73°31′32″W
- Area: less than one acre
- Built: 1851
- Architectural style: Greek Revival
- NRHP reference No.: 84000815
- Added to NRHP: March 1, 1984

The Ridgebury Congregational Church is a historic church in the Ridgebury section of Ridgefield, Connecticut. Founded in 1760, it is a member church of the United Church of Christ. It is a small wood frame Greek Revival structure, built about 1851 on an older foundation. Its main facade has a single centered entrance, flanked by tall windows. The entry is framed by pilasters and an entablature with cornice. The building's corners are also pilastered, with an entablature extending around the building below the roof line. A two-stage square tower rises above the entrance, topped with a parapet and pinnacles at the corners.

The building was listed on the National Register of Historic Places in 1984.

== See also ==
- National Register of Historic Places listings in Fairfield County, Connecticut
