= Asa Smith (politician) =

American politician

Member of the Connecticut Senate from the 13th District
- In office 1885–1886
- Preceded by: James W. Hyatt
- Succeeded by: Ebenezer J. Hill

13th, 18th, and 21st Warden of the Borough of Norwalk, Connecticut
- In office 1863–1865
- Preceded by: George R. Cholwell
- Succeeded by: Edwin Lockwood
- In office 1870–1871
- Preceded by: Edwin Lockwood
- Succeeded by: Samuel Lynes
- In office 1873–1874
- Preceded by: Asa Woodward
- Succeeded by: Edward P. Weed

Member of the Connecticut House of Representatives from Norwalk
- In office 1869–1870 Serving with Israel M. Bullock
- Preceded by: Asa Woodward, George Bell
- Succeeded by: Martin S. Craw, Talmadge Baker

Personal details
- Born: October 23, 1829 Norwalk, Connecticut
- Died: September 29, 1907 (aged 77) New Haven, Connecticut
- Resting place: Union Cemetery, Norwalk, Connecticut
- Spouse: Emma L. Hande- Smith (m. 1850)
- Children: 3
- Occupation: potter

Asa Smith (October 23, 1829 – September 29, 1907) was Warden of the Borough of Norwalk, Connecticut from 1863 to 1865, from 1870 to 1871 and from 1873 to 1874. He also was a member of the Connecticut House of Representatives representing Norwalk from 1869 to 1870, and was a member of the Connecticut Senate representing the 13th District from 1885 to 1886.

== Associations ==
- Member (1853), Master (1857) St. John's Masonic Lodge, No. 6
- High Priest (1858–1860), Washington Chapter, No. 24
- Grand High Priest (1863–1864), Grand Chapter Royal Arch Masons of Connecticut
- Eminent Commander (1867–1873), Clinton Commandery
- Grand Junior Deacon (1865), Grand Master (1870); Grand Lodge

Preceded by Asa Woodward; George Bell	Member of the Connecticut House of Representatives from Norwalk; 1869–1870; With: Israel M. Bullock	Succeeded by Martin S. Craw; Talmadge Baker
Preceded by George R. Cholwell	Warden of the Borough of Norwalk, Connecticut; 1863–1865	Succeeded by Edwin Lockwood
Preceded by Edwin Lockwood	Warden of the Borough of Norwalk, Connecticut; 1870–1871	Succeeded by Samuel Lynes
Preceded by Asa Woodward	Warden of the Borough of Norwalk, Connecticut; 1873–1874	Succeeded by Edward P. Weed
Preceded by James W. Hyatt	Member of the Connecticut Senate from the 13th District; 1885–1886	Succeeded by Ebenezer J. Hill
