= James W. Hyatt =

American politician (1837–1893)

James William Hyatt
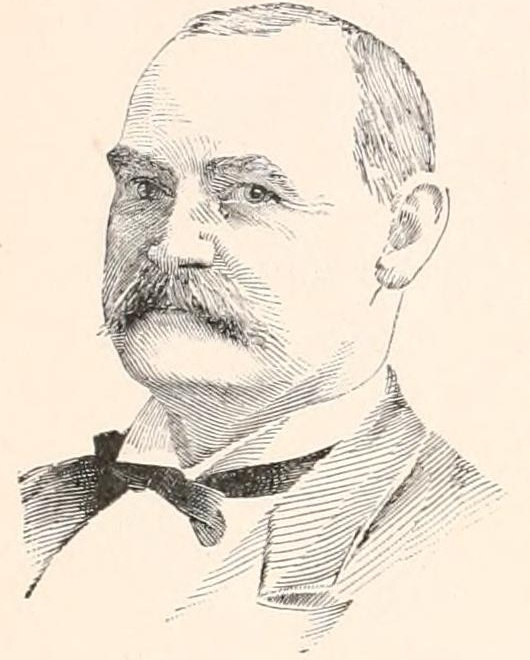

16th Treasurer of the United States
- In office May 24, 1887 – May 10, 1889
- President: Grover Cleveland; Benjamin Harrison
- Preceded by: Conrad N. Jordan
- Succeeded by: James N. Huston

24th, 26th, and 28th Warden of the Borough of Norwalk, Connecticut
- In office 1877–1878
- Preceded by: Samuel Daskam
- Succeeded by: Thomas H. Morison
- In office 1880–1882
- Preceded by: Thomas H. Morison
- Succeeded by: William H. Smith
- In office 1885–1887
- Preceded by: William H. Smith
- Succeeded by: George S. Gregory

Member of the Connecticut Senate from the 13th District
- In office 1884–1885
- Preceded by: Talmadge Baker
- Succeeded by: Asa Smith

Member of the Connecticut House of Representatives from Norwalk
- In office 1875–1877 Serving with Winfield S. Hanford
- Preceded by: Edward P. Weed, Thomas Guyer
- Succeeded by: Allen Betts, Talmadge Baker

Personal details
- Born: September 19, 1837 Norwalk, Connecticut, U.S.
- Died: March 12, 1893 (aged 55) Norwalk, Connecticut, U.S.
- Party: Republican; Democratic (after 1872)
- Spouse: Jane Maria Hoyt
- Occupation: businessman
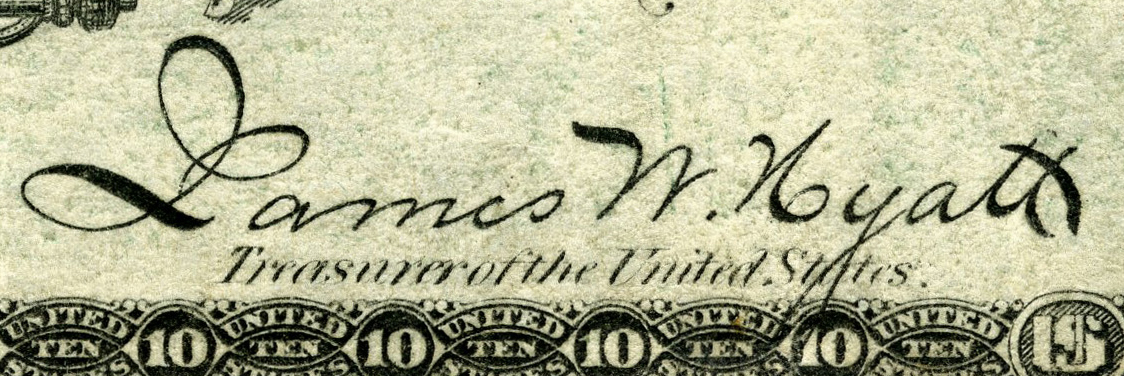
- Signature

Military service
- Allegiance: United States Union
- Years of service: 1861-1865
- Unit: 5th Regiment Connecticut Volunteer Infantry
- Battles/wars: American Civil War

James William Hyatt (September 19, 1837 – March 12, 1893) was Treasurer of the United States from 1887 to 1889. He had previously served as Bank Commissioner for the State of Connecticut, and United States Bank Examiner for Connecticut and Rhode Island. He served as a Democratic member of the Connecticut House of Representatives in 1875 and 1876, a member of the Connecticut Senate in 1884, and he was Warden of the Borough of Norwalk from 1877 to 1878, from 1880 to 1882, and from 1885 to 1887.

== Biography ==
James W. Hyatt was born in Norwalk, Connecticut, the son of James W. Hyatt, and Laura Gray on September 19, 1837. With the outbreak of the American Civil War in 1861, Hyatt joined the 5th Regiment Connecticut Volunteer Infantry. After the war, he moved to New York City to join Lockwood & Co., a leading banking house that was founded by LeGrand Lockwood of Norwalk.

In 1873, Hyatt attained control of the majority of stock of the Norwalk Horse Railway Company and returned to Norwalk to work as its Secretary and General Manager. He was president of the company at the time of his death. He also worked as Vice President of the Danbury and Norwalk Railroad, and, in 1881, became its president. He represented Norwalk in the Connecticut House of Representatives in 1875 and 1876 as a Democrat (Hyatt had earlier supported the Republican Party, but became a Democrat in 1872). In 1876, Governor of Connecticut Charles Roberts Ingersoll appointed Hyatt Bank Commissioner. He was later reappointed by Govs. Richard D. Hubbard, Charles B. Andrews, Hobart B. Bigelow, and Thomas M. Waller. In 1884, he was elected to the Connecticut Senate, but resigned so he could remain Bank Commissioner.

In 1886, President of the United States Grover Cleveland appointed Hyatt United States Bank Examiner for Connecticut and Rhode Island. In spring 1887, President Cleveland appointed Hyatt Treasurer of the United States, with Hyatt subsequently holding that office from May 24, 1887, to May 10, 1889.

After suffering for several weeks from gout and Bright's disease, Hyatt died at Norwalk on March 12, 1893. Surprising observers, who assumed that Hyatt was rich, Hyatt died a poor man and left virtually no estate for his widow.

Preceded by Edward P. Weed; Thomas Guyer	Member of the Connecticut House of Representatives from Norwalk; 1875–1877; With: Winfield S. Hanford	Succeeded by Allen Betts; Talmadge Baker
Preceded by Samuel Daskam	Warden of the Borough of Norwalk, Connecticut; 1877–1878	Succeeded by Thomas H. Morison
Preceded by Thomas H. Morison	Warden of the Borough of Norwalk, Connecticut; 1880–1882	Succeeded by William H. Smith
Preceded by Talmadge Baker	Member of the Connecticut Senate from the 13th District; 1884–1885	Succeeded by Asa Smith
Preceded by William H. Smith	Warden of the Borough of Norwalk, Connecticut; 1885–1887	Succeeded by George S. Gregory
Preceded by Conrad N. Jordan	Treasurer of the United States; May 24, 1887 – May 10, 1889	Succeeded by James N. Huston
