= Francis Burnell =

American physician

Francis Irwin Burnell

15th Mayor of Norwalk, Connecticut
- In office 1913–1915
- Preceded by: Edward J. Finnegan
- Succeeded by: Carl Harstrom

25th Mayor of South Norwalk, Connecticut
- In office 1907–1909
- Preceded by: Charles E. Dow
- Succeeded by: Robert M. Wolfe

Personal details
- Born: 1863 Pierstown, New York
- Died: March 18, 1926 Norwalk Hospital, Norwalk, Connecticut
- Resting place: Riverside Cemetery
- Party: Republican
- Spouse: Fanny Tripp
- Education: Long Island College Hospital (1894)
- Occupation: physician, school principal

Francis Irwin Burnell (1863 – March 18, 1926) was a one-term Republican mayor of Norwalk, Connecticut from 1913 to 1915. He was also mayor of South Norwalk from 1907 to 1909 prior to the consolidation of the two municipalities.

== Early life ==
Burnell was born in Pierstown, New York. He was raised in Otsego County, New York, and attended schools in Richfield Springs, New York.

He was the principal of the Hartwick Union school, and East End School at Oneonta, New York. He studied medicine at Long Island Medical College, and graduated in 1894. On February 26, 1895, he married Fanny Tripp of Mamaroneck, New York. Soon after his marriage, he took up graduate school at Polyclinic Hospital in New York City. He took up residence in Norwalk on September 28, 1895. he died of pneumonia in 1926.

== Political career ==
In 1907, Burnell defeated Republican Matthew Corbett for mayor of South Norwalk. He served two one-year terms, and when South Norwalk and Norwalk were consolidated he was elected the first mayor of the consolidated city.

== Associations ==
- Member, Old Well Lodge Number 108 of Masons

Preceded by Edward J. Finnegan	Mayor of Norwalk, Connecticut; 1913–1915	Succeeded by Carl Harstrom
Preceded by Charles E. Dow	Mayor of South Norwalk, Connecticut; 1907–1909	Succeeded by Robert M. Wolfe
