= Winfield S. Hanford =

American politician (1814–1884)

Winfield Scott Hanford

4th Mayor of South Norwalk, Connecticut
- In office 1878–1878
- Preceded by: Dudley P. Ely
- Succeeded by: Walter C. Quintard

Member of the Connecticut House of Representatives from Norwalk
- In office 1875–1877 Serving with James W. Hyatt
- Preceded by: Edward P. Weed, Thomas Guyer
- Succeeded by: Allen Betts, Talmadge Baker

Personal details
- Born: October 3, 1814 South Norwalk, Connecticut, U.S.
- Died: May 10, 1884 (aged 69) South Norwalk, Connecticut, U.S.
- Party: Democratic
- Spouse: Priscilla Thomas Snell
- Children: William A. S. Hanford, 1848-1849; William A. S. Hanford, 1850-1878; Charles St. John Hanford, 1852-1872; Mary Currier Hanford Woodward, 1856-1947; Martin Bioley Hanford, 1858-1861; Charlotte Cecilia Hanford, 1860-1866; Joseph Platt Hanford, 1864-1866; Annie Tamzen Hanford, 1864-1865.
- Occupation: Importer, Banker, Insurance Broker

Winfield Scott Hanford (1814 – 1884) was a one term mayor of South Norwalk, Connecticut in 1878. He was a member of the Connecticut House of Representatives in the sessions of 1875 and 1876.

He was the son of Joseph Platt Hanford and Charlotte St. John.

== Associations ==
- Vestryman, Trinity Church, South Norwalk
- Member, Washington Council Number 17 of Norwalk

Preceded by Dudley P. Ely	Mayor of South Norwalk, Connecticut; 1878	Succeeded by Walter C. Quintard
Preceded by Edward P. Weed; Thomas Guyer	Member of the Connecticut House of Representatives from South Norwalk; 1875–1877; With: James W. Hyatt	Succeeded by Allen Betts; Talmadge Baker
