= Ferdinand B. Smith =

American politician

- F.B. Smith in 1923

7th Mayor of Norwalk, Connecticut
- In office 1903–1904
- Preceded by: Charles L. Glover
- Succeeded by: George Buxton

Personal details
- Party: Democratic
- Occupation: carpenter

Military service
- Allegiance: United States
- Branch/service: Connecticut National Guard
- Rank: 1st Lieutenant
- Unit: Fourth Regiment, Company F

Ferdinand B. Smith (fl. 1903–1923) was a one term Democratic mayor of Norwalk, Connecticut from 1903 to 1904.

He ran again in 1907, but was defeated by Charles A. Scofield.

== Associations ==
- Eminent Commander, Clinton Commandery Number 3, Knights Templar.
- member (1884), St John's Number 6 Lodge of Masons

Preceded by Charles L. Glover	Mayor of Norwalk, Connecticut; 1903–1904	Succeeded by George Buxton
