= Carl Harstrom =

American educator and mayor

Carl Axel Harstrom

16th Mayor of Norwalk, Connecticut
- In office October 13, 1915 – 1917
- Preceded by: Francis Irwin Burnell
- Succeeded by: Jeremiah Donovan

Personal details
- Born: December 20, 1863 Västerås, Sweden
- Died: January 24, 1926 (aged 62) Norwalk, Connecticut
- Party: Republican
- Spouse: Lee Selden Partridge(d . August 27, 1926)
- Children: Frances (b. 1890), Carl Eric (b. 1892)
- Education: Peekskill Military Academy (1880); Hobart College (A.B., 1886; M.A., 1889); Yale College (1899, PhD.)
- Occupation: educator

Carl Axel Harstrom (December 20, 1863 – January 24, 1926) was an American educator, and one-term Republican mayor of Norwalk, Connecticut, from 1915 to 1917.

== Early life and family ==
Harstrom was born in Västerås, Sweden. He was the son of Carl Gustaf and Amelia Adolphina Fosberg Harstrom. His father was a manufacturer in Sweden who brought his family to America in 1872, when Carl Axel was nine years of age. He attended the Peekskill Military Academy, and graduated in 1880. He taught school for two years before entering Hobart College. He graduated as valedictory orator and with magna cum laude honors. He earned an A.B in 1886, and an M.A. in 1889. He served as headmaster at the Peekskill Academy for three years, and principle of Vienland Preparatory School for four years. On June 20, 1888, Professor Harstrom married Lee Selden Partridge of Phelps, New York.

== Life in Norwalk ==
He moved to Norwalk in 1891 to take a position as headmaster of the Norwalk Military Academy. He started his own private preparatory school for boys in Norwalk in 1893.

While teaching and serving as headmaster, he also pursued his own education at Yale University in classical Philology from 1896 to 1899. He earned his PhD in 1899. He was a member of Theta Delta Chi, and served as its national president for five consecutive terms.

=== Political career ===
In Norwalk, he served as a member of the Board of Estimate. In 1915, Harstrom was elected mayor of Norwalk and served a two-year term. During his term of office he reconstructed the financial system, with the result of making it more transparent to the public. He is credited with introducing voting machines to Norwalk. He is also credited for the many miles of hard pavement laid during his term.

During the World War he was chairman of the local draft board. He was a founding board member of the Norwalk Savings Bank and of the Fairfield County Savings Bank.

== Associations ==
- Member, American Philological Association
- Member, Phi Beta Kappa Society
- Member, Yale Club of New York City
- Member, Norwalk Club
- Member, Knob Outing Club of Norwalk
- Vestryman, Grace Episcopal Church
- President of the Grand Lodge, Theta Delta Chi
- Member, Senior Warden, Master Mason (1917), Worshipful Master (1922), St. John's Lodge No. 6, Free and Accepted Masons

== Awards ==
- Valedictorian, Hobart College
- Horace White Essay Prize
- Junior Greek Prize
- Senior Debate Prize
- Phi Beta Kappa

Preceded by Francis Irwin Burnell	Mayor of Norwalk, Connecticut; 1915–1917	Succeeded by Jeremiah Donovan
