= Heusted W. R. Hoyt =

American politician

Heusted Warner Reynolds Hoyt
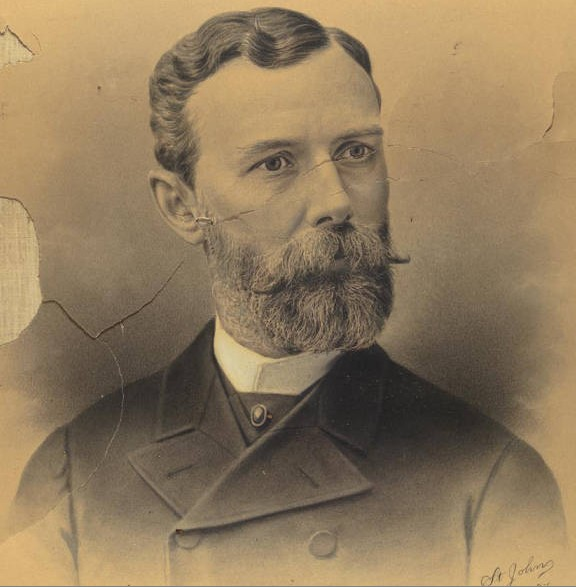

Member of the Connecticut Senate from the 12th District
- In office 1869–1870
- Preceded by: William C. Street
- Succeeded by: Elbert A. Woodward
- In office 1873–1874
- Preceded by: Asa Woodward
- Succeeded by: Galen A. Carter

Speaker of the Connecticut House of Representatives
- In office 1887–1889
- Preceded by: John A. Tibbits
- Succeeded by: John H. Perry

Member of the Connecticut House of Representatives from Greenwich
- In office 1886–1889

Personal details
- Born: November 1, 1842 Ridgefield, Connecticut, U.S.
- Died: April 8, 1894 (aged 51) Greenwich, Connecticut, U.S.
- Resting place: Christ Church Cemetery, Greenwich, Connecticut, U.S.
- Party: Republican
- Education: The Academy of Greenwich, Columbia College
- Occupation: lawyer

Military service
- Branch/service: Connecticut National Guard
- Years of service: 1863–1877
- Rank: Colonel
- Unit: Company F, Connecticut 8th Regiment; Connecticut 4th Regiment

Heusted Warner Reynolds Hoyt (November 1, 1842 – April 8, 1894) was a member of the Connecticut Senate representing the 12th District from 1869 to 1870 and from 1873 to 1874. He was a member of the Connecticut House of Representatives from 1886 to 1889, and he served as Speaker of the Connecticut House of Representatives from 1887 to 1889.

== Early life and family ==
Hoyt was born in Ridgefield, Connecticut on November 1, 1842. He was the son of the Rev. Warner Hoyt, the rector of St. Stephen's Episcopal Church, and Elizabeth Phillipina Reynolds. His father died when Heusted was three years old.

== Political career ==
He was elected a member of the Connecticut Senate in 1869 and in 1873.

He was elected a member of the Connecticut House of Representatives from 1886 to 1889, and he served as Speaker of the Connecticut House of Representatives from 1887 to 1889.

He was elected the first judge of the Borough Court of Greenwich in 1889, and held that office as long as he lived.

Connecticut State Senate
Preceded by William C. Street	Member of the Connecticut Senate from the 12th District; 1869–1870	Succeeded by Elbert A. Woodward
Preceded by Asa Woodward	Member of the Connecticut Senate from the 12th District; 1873–1874	Succeeded by Galen A. Carter
Connecticut House of Representatives
Preceded by	Member of the Connecticut House of Representatives from Greenwich; 1886–1888	Succeeded by
Preceded by John A. Tibbits	Speaker of the Connecticut House of Representatives; 1887–1889	Succeeded by John H. Perry
