= William Tammany =

American lawyer

William F. Tammany

28th Mayor of South Norwalk, Connecticut
- In office 1911–1912
- Preceded by: Albert Pohlman
- Succeeded by: Robert M. Wolfe

Personal details
- Born: 1873 Connecticut
- Died: June 29, 1951 (aged 77–78) Norwalk, Connecticut
- Party: Republican
- Spouse: Lucy C.
- Occupation: Lawyer, judge

William F. Tammany (1873–1951) was a one term Republican mayor of South Norwalk, Connecticut from 1911 to 1912.

He was the senior partner of the Tammany and Connery law firm on Washington Street.

In 1901, he was the prosecuting attorney for the city of Norwalk.

In 1911, he was appointed a judge of the Town Court of Norwalk.

In 1916, he was counsel for the plaintiff in the case Savings Bank of Danbury v. Loewe [242 U.S. 357 (1917)] which was heard by the Supreme Court. The case was argued on December 11, 1916, and decided on January 8, 1917.

In 1922, he was Corporation Counsel of the city of Norwalk.

In 1950, he was president of South Norwalk Savings Bank.

Preceded by Albert Pohlman	Mayor of South Norwalk, Connecticut; 1911–1912	Succeeded by Robert M. Wolfe
