= Harvey Fitch =

American politician

16th Warden of the Borough of Norwalk, Connecticut
- In office 1868–1869
- Preceded by: Edward P. Weed
- Succeeded by: Edwin Lockwood

Personal details
- Born: May 27, 1816 Wilton, Connecticut
- Died: August 6, 1890 (aged 74) Norwalk, Connecticut
- Resting place: Union Cemetery, Norwalk, Connecticut
- Spouse: Rebecca Betts (m. May 29, 1838)
- Children: John Fitch
- Occupation: Grocer

Harvey Fitch (May 27, 1816 – August 6, 1890) was Warden of the Borough of Norwalk, Connecticut from 1868 to 1869.

He was born in Wilton, Connecticut on May 27, 1816, the son of Daniel Fitch and Lucretia Whitney. He married Rebecca Betts on May 29, 1838. They lived in Wilton until 1848, when they moved to Norwalk.

Preceded by Edward P. Weed	Warden of the Borough of Norwalk, Connecticut; 1868–1869	Succeeded by Edwin Lockwood
