= Conrad N. Jordan =

American banker and public servant

15th Treasurer of the United States
- In office May 1, 1885 – May 23, 1887
- President: Grover Cleveland
- Preceded by: A. U. Wyman
- Succeeded by: James N. Huston

Personal details
- Born: Conrad Napoleon Jordan; April 20, 1830 New York City, U.S.
- Died: February 26, 1903 (aged 72) New York City
- Party: Democratic
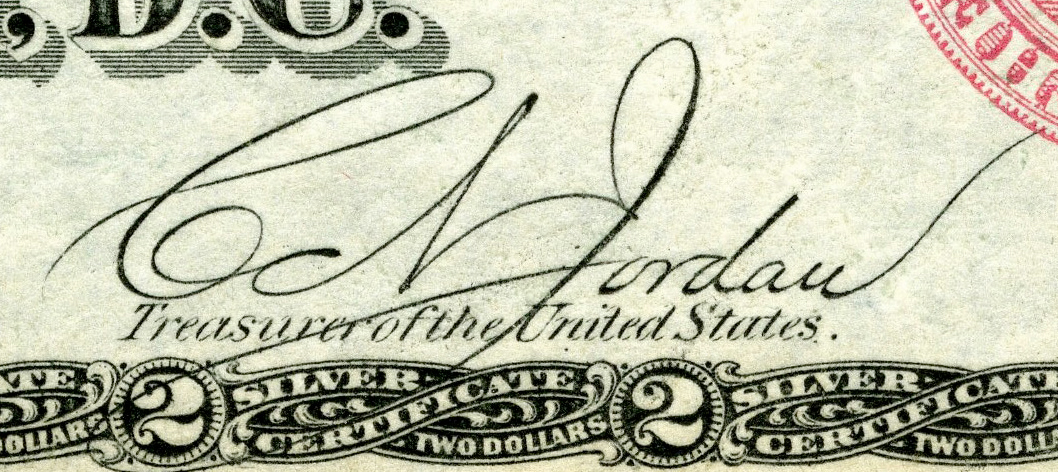
- Signature

Conrad Napoleon Jordan (April 20, 1830 – February 26, 1903) was an American banker who was Treasurer of the United States from 1885 to 1887.

== Biography ==
Conrad N. Jordan was born in New York City on April 20, 1830. He joined a printing office at age thirteen and became trained as a compositor. He worked as a compositor until 1852, when he became a clerk at the Hanover Bank of New York. He worked his way up the ranks at the Hanover Bank of New York until he had become the bank's general bookkeeper. He later moved to Fishkill, New York, to work in a leadership position in a bank there. Early in his career, Jordan became acquainted with Samuel J. Tilden and would have a longstanding business relationship and friendship with Tilden. When the National Western Bank of New York was created in 1864, Jordan became its cashier. Jordan became known as an expert in the field of public accounting and currency exchange. In the wake of Black Friday (1869), Jordan was auditor to the receiver of the Gold Exchange Bank.

In 1880, partially because of his connection with Tilden, Jordan became Treasurer of the New York, Ontario and Western Railway. During this period, he unsuccessfully lobbied the New York State Legislature to create an entity to be known as the United States Exchange and Transfer Company to function as a nationwide clearing house.

A Democrat, Jordan supported Grover Cleveland in the 1884 presidential election and worked with the campaign team drawing up plans to reform the United States Department of the Treasury. Following the appointment of Daniel Manning as United States Secretary of the Treasury, Cleveland nominated Jordan to be Treasurer of the United States to implement the plans he had drawn up. He served as Treasurer of the United States from May 1, 1885 to March 23, 1887.

In 1887, Jordan became President of the Western National Bank of New York. There, he led the bank's involvement with the Pell-Simmons syndicate in its attempts to capture the Sixth National Bank.

President Cleveland named Jordan Assistant Treasurer of the United States in April 1893. Following the election of William McKinley in the 1896 presidential election, a number of leading bankers, including McKinley's new Treasury Secretary, Lyman J. Gage, urged McKinley to retain Jordan as Assistant Treasurer of the United States. He was consequently re-appointed in April 1897.

On February 26, 1903, Jordan died of "the grip" [sic] at his West End Avenue home.

Government offices
Preceded by A. U. Wyman	Treasurer of the United States; May 1, 1885 – March 23, 1887	Succeeded by James W. Hyatt
