= List of mayors of Norwalk, Connecticut =

The mayor of Norwalk, Connecticut is the chief executive of the government of Norwalk, Connecticut, United States, as stipulated by the Charter of the City of Norwalk. The current mayor of Norwalk is Barbara Smyth, a Democrat.

== Mayors prior to 1913 ==
Elections were held on the first Monday in October annually up to 1913.

=== Mayors of the city of South Norwalk from 1870 to 1913 ===
On August 18, 1870, the settlement of Old Well was incorporated as the city of South Norwalk.

Name	Start year	End year
Dudley P. Ely	1870	1872
Walter C. Quintard	1873	1875
Dudley P. Ely	1876	1877
Winfield S. Hanford	1878	1878
Walter C. Quintard	1879	1879
Christian Swartz	1880	1880
Edwin Adams	1881	1881
Christian Swartz	1882	1882
Peter L. Cunningham	1883	1883
Richard H. Golden	1884	1884
Nelson Taylor Jr.	1885	1885
John L. Richards	1886	1886
William B. Hubbell	1887	1888
Frank Comstock	1889	1889
Edwin Wilcox	1890	1890
William B. Reed	1891	1892
George Lockwood	1893	1893
Mortimer M. Lee	1894	1896
Charles G. Bohannan	1897	1898
J. Milton Coburn	1897	1898
Charles G. Bohannan	1899	1901
Mortimer M. Lee	1901	1902
John J. Cavanagh	1902	1903
Charles E. Dow	1903	1907
Francis I. Burnell	1907	1909
Robert M. Wolfe	1909	1910
Albert M. Pohlman	1910	1911
William F. Tammany	1911	1912
Robert M. Wolfe	1912	1913

=== Wardens of the Borough of Norwalk from 1836 to 1872 ===
The Borough of Norwalk was incorporated on May 4, 1836. The head of the Borough was titled its Warden.

Name	Years served
Joseph W. Hubbell	1836, 1837, 1838, 1840, 1841, 1855
Clark Bissell	1839
William J. Street	1842, 1843, 1844
Stiles Curtis	1845, 1846, 1847, 1848, 1849, 1850, 1851
Charles E. Disbrow	1852
Samuel Lynes	1853, 1854, 1859, 1871
Dimon Fanton	1856, 1857, 1858
William C. Street	1860
George R. Cholwell	1861, 1862
Asa Smith	1863, 1864, 1870, 1873
Edwin Lockwood	1865, 1866, 1869
Edward P. Weed	1867, 1874§
Harvey Fitch	1868
Asa Woodward	1872
Samuel Daskam	1874§§, 1875, 1876
James W. Hyatt	1877, 1880, 1881, 1885, 1886, 1887§
Thomas H. Morison	1878, 1879
William H. Smith	1882, 1883, 1884
George S. Gregory	1887§§§
James G. Gregory	1888
Clarence B. Coolidge	1889
John H. Lee	1890
Edwin O. Keeler	1891
John D. Kimmey	1892
Edgar N. Sloan	1893

§ Resigned.
§§ Elected to fill the vacancy caused by Edward P. Weed's resignation.
§§§ Elected to fill vacancy caused by James W. Hyatt's resignation.

=== Mayors of the city of Norwalk from 1893 to 1913 ===
On June 30, 1893, the Borough of Norwalk was incorporated as the city of Norwalk.

Name	Start year	End year
Edwin O. Keeler	1893	1894
James T. Hubbell	1894	1895
Arthur C. Wheeler	1895	1897
Charles L. Glover	1897	1901
George Buxton	1901	1902
Charles L. Glover	1902	1903
Ferdinand B. Smith	1903	1904
George Buxton	1904	1905
Charles L. Glover	1905	1905
Wallace Dann	1905	1907
Charles A. Scofield	1907	1908
John J. Cavanagh	1908	1909
Leeman M. Brundage	1909	1910
Edward J. Finnegan	1910	1913

== Mayors of the city of Norwalk from 1913 to the present ==
The city was consolidated on June 6, 1913. Elections for mayor are held every two years, in odd numbered years. The former city of South Norwalk became the new Norwalk’s Second Taxing District.

Name	Start year	End year	Political Party
Francis Irwin Burnell	1913	1915	Republican
Carl Axel Harstrom	1915	1917	Republican
Jeremiah Donovan	1917	1921	Democratic
Calvin Barton	1921	1923	Republican
Thomas Robins	1923	1927	Republican
Anson F. Keeler	1927	1931	Republican
Harold L. Nash	1931	1933	Republican
Charles C. Swartz	1933	1935	Democratic
Frank T. Stack	1935	1943	Democratic
Robert B. Oliver	1943	1945	Republican
Edward J. Kelley	1945	1947	Democratic
Irving Freese	1947	1951	Socialist
Irving Freese	1951	1955	Independent Party of Norwalk
George Brunjes	1955	1957	Democratic
Irving Freese	1957	1959	Independent Party of Norwalk
John Shostak	1959	1961	Republican
Frank J. Cooke	1961	1965	Republican
Frank Zullo	1965	1971	Democratic
Donald J. Irwin	1971	1975	Democratic
Jennie Cave	1975	1977	Independent Party of Connecticut
William A. Collins	1977	1981	Democratic
Thomas C. O'Connor	1981	1983	Republican
William A. Collins	1983	1987	Democratic
Frank Esposito	1987	2001	Republican
Alex Knopp	2001	2005	Democratic
Richard A. Moccia	2005	2013	Republican
Harry Rilling	2013	2025	Democratic
Barbara Smyth	2025	present	Democratic

== See also ==
- History of Norwalk, Connecticut
- Connecticut's 12th Senate district
- List of members of the Connecticut General Assembly from Norwalk
