= Christian Swartz =

American politician

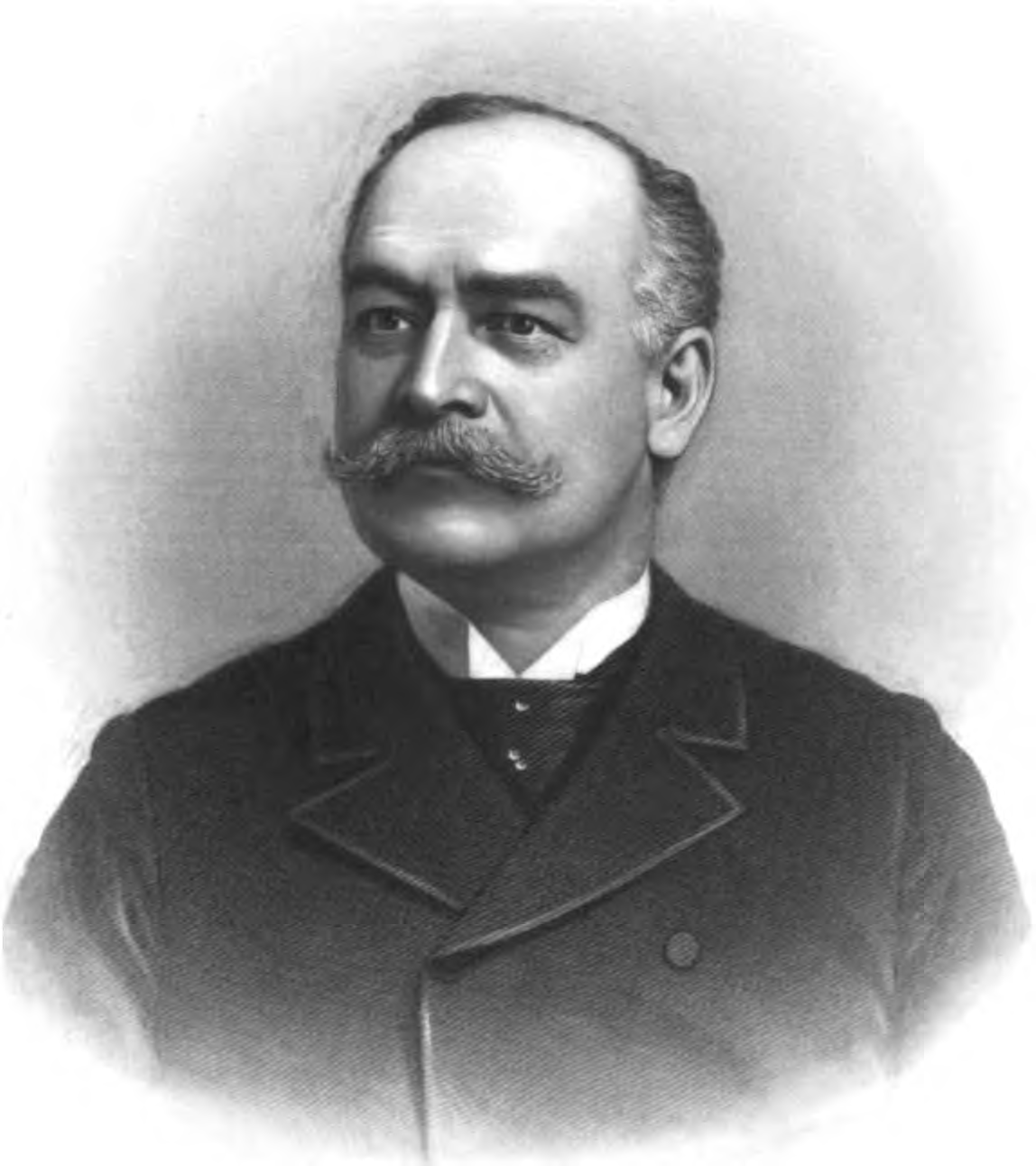

6th and 8th Mayor of South Norwalk, Connecticut
- In office 1880–1880
- Preceded by: Walter C. Quintard
- Succeeded by: Edwin Adams
- In office 1882–1882
- Preceded by: Edwin Adams
- Succeeded by: Peter L. Cunningham

Personal details
- Born: June 15, 1846 Wurtemberg, Germany
- Died: 1932
- Party: Democratic
- Spouse(s): Adora M. Flynn (m. February 4th, 1875)
- Children: Charles C. Swartz, Helen M Swartz
- Education: Eastman's Business College (1867)
- Occupation: cigar manufacturer, banker

Military service
- Branch/service: United States Army
- Years of service: 1864–1865
- Battles/wars: American Civil War

Christian Swartz (June 15, 1846 – 1932) was a two-term mayor of South Norwalk, Connecticut, United States in 1880, and 1882. He was treasurer and general manager of The Old Well Cigar Company, of South Norwalk, and a Sheriff of Fairfield County.

== Early life and family ==
He was born in Württemberg, Germany. He came to the United States with his parents in 1849 at the age of three.

His father's family were owners and editors of a newspaper in Germany and his father did newspaper work there and later on in the United States, as he was a skillful translator.

Swartz attended grammar school in Newark, New Jersey until the age of fourteen and spent several winter terms at district schools in Ohio and Minnesota. He went to high school in Hastings, Minnesota, and studied at Eastman's Business College in Poughkeepsie, New York where he graduated in 1866.

On February 4, 1875, Swartz married Adora M. Flynn. They had two children, Charles C. Swartz, the 22nd mayor of Norwalk, and Helen M Swartz.

== Business pursuits ==
He then went to work for cigar manufacturer, Jeremiah Bernd of Danbury. In the spring of 1868, in partnership with Bernd, he opened a cigar shop in South Norwalk named C. Swartz and Company. Bernd afterwards sold his interest to Reed Haviland. In 1880, Swatrz incorporated under the name Old Well Cigar Company. The business grew steadily, and when the United States Revenue Department renumbered the factories in the district, they named Swartz' factory as "Factory No. 1."

In 1882, South Norwalk had grown such that another bank was deemed necessary. In partnership with Hon. R. H. Rowan, Hon. John H. Ferris, Hon. Talmadge Baker, and other prominent men, Swartz was one of the organizers of the City National Bank.

Swartz was president of the Volk Hat Company, a director of the Norwalk Lock Company, and the City National Bank of South Norwalk.

== Civic activities ==
He was city councilman in 1878, mayor of South Norwalk in 1880 and again in 1882, sheriff of Fairfield County from 1884 to 1887, and he was member of the state shell-fish commission beginning in 1893.

He served on the Norwalk Water Commission for 16 years, was president of the board of Estimate and Taxation, and was president of the Norwalk Hospital.

He served as commander of the Couglas Fowler Post in the Grand Army of the Republic. He was chosen state commander in 1921.

He was chairman of the city water commission, president of the board of estimates and taxation of the town of Norwalk and President of the Norwalk Hospital.

== Memberships ==
- Free and Accepted Mason.
- Grand Commander (1892), Knights Templar.
- South Norwalk Club.
- Norwalk Club.
- Norwalk Country Club.

Preceded by Edwin Adams	Mayor of South Norwalk, Connecticut; 1882	Succeeded by Peter L. Cunningham
Preceded by Walter C. Quintard	Mayor of South Norwalk, Connecticut; 1880	Succeeded by Edwin Adams
