= Richard A. Moccia =

American politician (born 1943)

- Moccia in 2011

39th Mayor of Norwalk, Connecticut
- In office 2005–2013
- Preceded by: Alex Knopp
- Succeeded by: Harry Rilling

Personal details
- Born: August 9, 1943 (age 83) Stamford, Connecticut, U.S.
- Party: Republican
- Spouse: Barbara A. Vieux (m. 1981)
- Children: 4
- Education: Norwalk Community College (AA) Sacred Heart University (AA) Marywood University (BS)

Richard A. Moccia (born August 9, 1943) is an American politician who is the former mayor of Norwalk, Connecticut. He is a Republican, and was elected in 2005 and served four terms prior to his 2013 mayoral election loss to Harry Rilling. Moccia defeated incumbent mayor Alex Knopp by fewer than 200 votes in 2005. In 2019, Moccia ran for First Selectman of Ridgefield, but was not elected. He currently serves on the Ridgefield Board of Finance.

== Early life and education ==
Moccia was born in Stamford, Connecticut to Elena "Helen" (née Morsa; 1906–?) and Bonifacio "Benny" Moccia (1900–1993). His father was born in San Mango sul Calore in Campania, Italy and immigrated to the United States in 1922, becoming a naturalized US citizen in 1934. He worked as a machine operator. His mother was born in Rhode Island to Italian parents. He had two elder brothers and a sister.

He graduated from Stamford High School and then studied at Norwalk Community College where he completed an associate degree in Liberal Arts and a second one from Sacred Heart University in Paralegal Studies. He also holds a degree in Business Administration from Marywood College.

== Political career ==
Moccia has served as a member of the Norwalk Common Council, the Fire Commission, the Fair Rent Commission, and the Redistricting Committee. He is a former Constable, City Sheriff and Connecticut State Marshal.

=== Mayoral Administration ===
As mayor, Moccia was a member of the Mayors Against Illegal Guns Coalition, an organization formed in 2006 and co-chaired by New York City mayor Michael Bloomberg and Boston mayor Thomas Menino.

== Personal life ==
On October 3, 1981, Moccia married Barbara A. Vieux (b. 1938), in Norwalk, Connecticut. Since 2014, he has been a resident of Ridgefield, Connecticut. They have four children.

Political offices
Preceded by Alex Knopp	Mayor of Norwalk, Connecticut; 2006-2013	Succeeded by Harry Rilling
