= George Buxton =

American politician

George B. Buxton

5th and 8th Mayor of Norwalk, Connecticut
- In office 1901–1902
- Preceded by: Charles L. Glover
- Succeeded by: Charles L. Glover
- In office 1904–1905
- Preceded by: Ferdinand B. Smith
- Succeeded by: Charles L. Glover

Personal details
- Born: December 1866 United States
- Died: 1942 (aged 75–76) Illinois, United States
- Party: Republican
- Spouse: Juliette Atkinson (m. 1918)

George B. Buxton (December 1866 - 1942) was an American politician. He served two non-consecutive terms as the Republican mayor of Norwalk, Connecticut from 1901 to 1902 and from 1904 to 1905.

He visited Cuba, and later resided in Orange, New Jersey.

== Associations ==
- Member, St. John's Number 6 Masonic Lodge; Master Mason (1898)
- Member, The Norwalk Club

Preceded by Charles L. Glover	Mayor of Norwalk, Connecticut; 1901–1902	Succeeded by Charles L. Glover
Preceded by Ferdinand B. Smith	Mayor of Norwalk, Connecticut; 1904–1905	Succeeded by Charles L. Glover
