= John D. Kimmey =

34th Warden of the Borough of Norwalk, Connecticut
- In office 1892–1893
- Preceded by: Edwin O. Keeler
- Succeeded by: Edgar N. Sloan

Personal details
- Born: May 21, 1828 Coeymans, New York
- Party: Republican
- Spouse: Adeline Hoyt (m. October 14, 1849)
- Occupation: machinist, merchant, freight agent, grocer

John D. Kimmey (May 21, 1828 – ?) was Warden of the Borough of Norwalk, Connecticut, from 1892 to 1893.

== Early life and family ==
He born May 21, 1828, in Coeymans, New York, the son of David I. Kimmey and Maria Niver. He married Adeline Hoyt on October 14, 1849.

== Political career ==
In 1880, he was first vice president of the Republican Party for New York's 23rd assembly district.

In 1881, he was elected an alternate to the New York Republican Convention.

In 1886, he moved to Norwalk.

In 1888, he was a member of the board of directors of the American Loan and Trust Company of 113 Broadway, New York City.

He was an investor and director of the Roton Point Improvement Company.

In 1901, he was an original incorporator of the South Norwalk Trust Company.

He was chairman of the Norwalk Sewers Committee.

== Associations ==
- Member, Masonic Lodge
- Member, Norwalk Club

Preceded by Edwin O. Keeler	Warden of the Borough of Norwalk, Connecticut; 1892–1893	Succeeded by Edgar N. Sloan
