= Samuel Lynes =

American physician (1822–1878)

7th, 10th and 19th Warden of the Borough of Norwalk, Connecticut
- In office 1853–1855
- Preceded by: Charles E. Disbrow
- Succeeded by: Joseph W. Hubbell
- In office 1859–1860
- Preceded by: Dimon Fanton
- Succeeded by: William C. Street
- In office 1871–1872
- Preceded by: Asa Smith
- Succeeded by: Asa Woodward

Personal details
- Born: 1822 Ridgebury, Connecticut
- Died: August 19, 1870 Norwalk, Connecticut
- Resting place: Saint Pauls Cemetery, Norwalk, Connecticut
- Spouse: Emily Augusta Sherry (m. June 23, 1858)
- Education: Yale College (1842), College of Physicians and Surgeons (1845)
- Occupation: Physician

Samuel Lynes (1822 – July 29, 1878) was Warden of the Borough of Norwalk, Connecticut from 1853 to 1855, from 1859 to 1860, and from 1871 to 1872.

He was born in Ridgebury, Connecticut in 1822, the son of Stephen C. and Hannah Lynes.

He graduated from Yale College in 1842, then went on to study at the College of Physicians and Surgeons in New York. He moved to Norwalk in 1845 where he practiced medicine until his death.

== Associations ==
- President, Fairfield County Savings Bank
- Treasurer, Norwalk Fire Insurance Company
- Director, National Bank of Norwalk
- Trustee, St. John's Masonic Lodge Number 6
- Member, Washington Chapter Number 24, Royal Arch Masons
- Member, Odd Fellows
- Vestryman, St. Paul's Episcopal Church
- Trustee, Connecticut Hospital for the Insane at Middletown
- Member, Water Commission
- Member, Auditor; Norwalk Club
- Member, Norwalk Yacht Club

Preceded by Charles E. Disbrow	Warden of the Borough of Norwalk, Connecticut; 1853–1855	Succeeded by Joseph W. Hubbell
Preceded by Dimon Fanton	Warden of the Borough of Norwalk, Connecticut; 1859–1860	Succeeded by William C. Street
Preceded by Asa Smith	Warden of the Borough of Norwalk, Connecticut; 1871–1872	Succeeded by Asa Woodward
