= Elbert A. Woodward =

American politician

Elbirt Almeron Woodward

Member of the Connecticut Senate from the 12th District
- In office 1870–1871
- Preceded by: Huested W. R. Hoyt
- Succeeded by: Asa Woodward

Personal details
- Born: March 24, 1836
- Died: September 29, 1905 (aged 69)
- Resting place: Riverside Cemetery, Norwalk, Connecticut
- Party: Democratic
- Spouse(s): Harriet Hannah Ford (m. August 24, 1857, New York City, divorced October 1880), Mary Currier Hanford (m. April 21, 1881, South Norwalk)
- Occupation: farmer

Elbirt Almeron Woodward (March 24, 1836 – September 29, 1905) was a major figure in the Boss Tweed corruption scandal in 1871. He served as the assistant clerk to the New York City Board of Supervisors. He was a member of the Connecticut Senate representing the 12th District from 1870 to 1871. At the Democratic State Convention a year after his term as senator, he received 89 votes for the party's nomination for Lieutenant Governor of Connecticut. Although he was most commonly referred to as "Elbert A. Woodward," his true given name was spelled "Elbirt" as proven by examples of his actual handwritten signature.

== Early life and family ==
He married Harriet Hannah Ford on August 24, 1857, in New York City. They had seven children. They divorced in October 1880. Elbirt A. Woodward married Mary Currier Hanford, the daughter of a business partner—on April 21, 1881, in South Norwalk. They had one daughter.

== Tammany Hall corruption ==
In his capacity as assistant clerk, he would inflate the amount of bills to the city, and distribute the money to the bank accounts of his accomplices. He became wealthy by processing, depositing and sharing in many of the fraudulent payments. He assisted in defrauding the city of between $25 and $45 million. He was indicted and tried, but fled the United States to Spain. He was arrested in Chicago, and brought back to New York. In the end, he avoided jail time, and was forced to repay $151,779 to the city.

On December 18, 1871, a grand jury indicted Tweed and Woodward on two counts of forgery in the third degree and one count of grand larceny. No trial followed any of these indictments. On February 3, 1872, a new series of indictments based on the same charges and evidence were issued. These included two counts of forgery in the third degree against Tweed and Woodward, one count of grand larceny, and one of larceny

In his later years, he was a farmer in Norwalk.

== Associations ==
- Founding incorporator (1871), Old Well Club

Connecticut State Senate
Preceded by Huested W. R. Hoyt	Member of the Connecticut Senate from the 12th District; 1870–1871	Succeeded by Asa Woodward
