= Josiah Carter =

American politician

Josiah Mason Carter

Speaker of the Connecticut House of Representatives
- In office 1862–1863
- Preceded by: Augustus Brandegee
- Succeeded by: Chauncey Fitch Cleveland

Member of the Connecticut House of Representatives from Norwalk
- In office 1857–1858
- Preceded by: Asa Hill, Daniel Nash
- Succeeded by: Daniel Nash, A. Homer Byington
- In office 1861–1863
- Preceded by: William Craw, Samuel Olmsted
- Succeeded by: William C. Street, Joseph H. Cummings

Personal details
- Born: June 19, 1813 New Canaan, Connecticut, US
- Died: March 21, 1868 (aged 54) Norwalk, Connecticut, US
- Party: Whig, Republican
- Education: Yale College (1836)
- Occupation: lawyer

Josiah Mason Carter (June 19, 1813 – March 21, 1868) was a Whig member of the Connecticut House of Representatives representing Norwalk, Connecticut in 1857 and 1861 to 1862. He served as speaker of the Connecticut House in 1862.

== Early life and family ==
Cater was born in New Canaan on June 19, 1813. He graduated at Yale College in the year of 1836. He studied law with Thomas B. Osborne in Fairfield, and was admitted to the Fairfield County bar in August 1839. He practiced law in New York City in 1841. He was married the same year.

In 1847, he moved to Norwalk, and formed a law partnership with Thomas B. Butler, who was later appointed to the Connecticut Supreme Court. He continued in the partnership until 1855.

He was a member of the Connecticut House of Representatives in the years 1850, 1861 and 1862, and the last year was Speaker of the House.

He was the candidate of the Whig Party for the office of Lieutenant Governor in 1856.

He was appointed State Attorney for Fairfield County in 1862 and held the office until his death.

On two occasions he declined to be a candidate for a judgeship in the Superior Court, when it was urged upon him by his political friends then in power.

He died in Norwalk on March 21, 1868.

Preceded by Asa Hill; Daniel Nash	Member of the Connecticut House of Representatives from Norwalk; 1857–1858; With: William Craw	Succeeded by Daniel Nash; A. Homer Byington
Preceded by William Craw; Samuel Olmsted	Member of the Connecticut House of Representatives from Norwalk; 1861–1863; With: Peter L. Cunningham, Ebenezer J. Hill	Succeeded by William C. Street; Joseph H. Cummings
Preceded by Augustus Brandegee	Speaker of the Connecticut House of Representatives; 1862–1863	Succeeded by Chauncey Fitch Cleveland
