= John Shostak =

American politician (died 1971)

29th Mayor of Norwalk, Connecticut
- In office 1959–1961
- Preceded by: Irving Freese
- Succeeded by: Frank J. Cooke

Member of the Connecticut House of Representatives
- In office 1947–1949
- Preceded by: George Sartain
- Succeeded by: Louis Lamaire
- In office 1955–1967
- Preceded by: Frank Raymond, Fannie Harris
- Succeeded by: E. Ronald Bard, Otha Brown, Jr.

Personal details
- Died: January 27, 1971
- Party: Republican
- Spouse: Hedwig "Hedgie" Marcel (1917–2013)
- Education: University of Connecticut

John Shostak (died January 27, 1971) was a Republican member of the Connecticut House of Representatives from Norwalk, Connecticut for four terms, and the mayor of Norwalk from 1959 to 1961.

== Early life and family ==
He was the son of Michael Shostak and Olga Leskewitch, and a graduate of the University of Connecticut College of Pharmacy.

== Political career ==
He served four terms as member of Connecticut House of Representatives. He was an alternate delegate to Republican National Convention from Connecticut in 1960. He served as mayor for one term, and declined to seek re-election for personal reasons. He ran for State Senator in 1966.

=== State representative ===
- Cities and Boroughs Committee
- State Development Committee
- Public Personnel Committee
- Federal and Intergovernmental Relations Committee
- Public Health and Safety Committee
- State Technical Institute Committee
- Industrial Safety Codes Committee

=== Mayoral administration ===
- Norwalk Harbor Safety Patrol
- Cross Street Bridge
- Cloverleaf Bill
- Settled Teachers Strike

== Associations ==
- Director, Norwalk Heart Association
- Chairman, Heart Fund
- Director, United Fund County Chapter
- Chairman, National Conference of Christians and Jews
- Director, United Cerebral Palsy, Fairfield County
- President, Norwalk Exchange Club
- Chairman, Norwalk, Kiddies' Christmas Party
- Chairman, United Jewish Appeal Fund Drive
- Chairman, Community Fund Drive, Jewish Center
- Republican Party Fund Raiser
- Co-Chairman Red Cross Drive
- Chairman, Southwestern Regional Planning Group
- Advisory Committee, Norwalk Community College
- Chairman, Charter Revision Committee
- Executive Committee, Salk Institute Building Fund
- Director, Biddy League
- Founder, Babe Ruth League
- Sponsor, Pony League
- Pastime Social Club
- Norwalk Athletic Association
- University of Connecticut, College of Pharmacy
- Diplomate, American College of Apothecaries
- Connecticut Pharmaceutical Association
- American Pharmaceutical Association
- Kappa Psi, Pharmaceutical Fraternity
- Father's Club
- Elks
- Masons
- NAACP
- Circus Saints and Sinners
- member of branch 227 of Ukrainian National Association

== Awards ==
- Citation, American Legion Post 12, meritorious service
- Certificate, Catholic War Veterans, Cross of Peace Crusade
- Citizens Award, Jewish War Veterans
- Certificate, United Fund
- Special Award, YMCA
- Navy League of the US
- Ahepa Society

== Legacy ==
- The John Shostak Apartments public housing at 24½ Monroe Street

Preceded by George Sartain	Connecticut House of Representatives from Norwalk; 1947 – 1949	Succeeded by Louis Lamaire
Preceded by Frank Raymond; Fannie Harris	Connecticut House of Representatives from Norwalk; 1955–1967	Succeeded by E. Ronald Bard; Otha Brown, Jr.
Preceded by Irving Freese	Mayor of Norwalk, Connecticut; 1959–1961	Succeeded by Frank J. Cooke
