= Dudley Ely =

American politician

Dudley Pettibone Ely
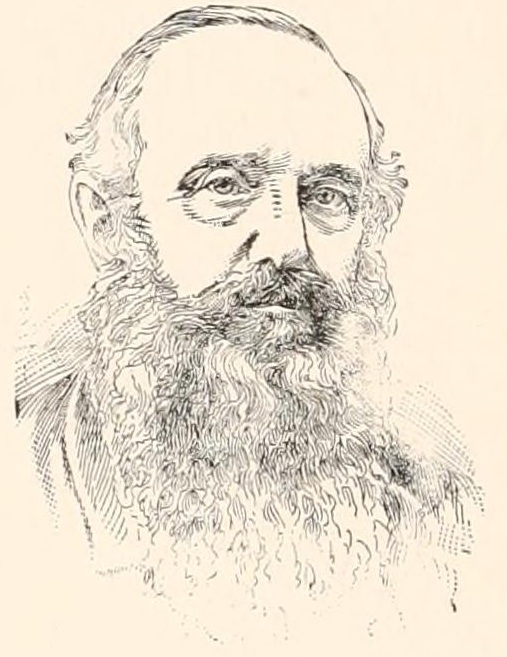

1st and 3rd Mayor of South Norwalk, Connecticut
- In office 1870–1872
- Preceded by: Office established
- Succeeded by: Walter C. Quintard
- In office 1876–1877
- Preceded by: Walter C. Quintard
- Succeeded by: Winfield S. Hanford

Personal details
- Born: November 16, 1817 Simsbury, Connecticut
- Died: July 9, 1895 (aged 77)
- Resting place: Simsburg, Hartford, Connecticut
- Spouse: Charlotte W. Phelps (m. November 28, 1844)
- Children: Harriette Pauline, Charlotte E., Augusta A., Dudline P.
- Occupation: Banker

Military service
- Unit: Colored Light Artillery

Dudley Pettibone Ely (November 16, 1817 – July 9, 1895) was the first mayor of South Norwalk, Connecticut, beginning in 1870, when the city was first incorporated. He served from 1870 to 1872, was succeeded in office by Walter C. Quintard, and then returned to office from 1876 to 1877.

== Early life and family ==
He was born in Simsbury, Connecticut, the youngest child of Benjamin Ely, a graduate of Yale College in 1786. As a youth, he worked in a store in Simsbury, and by the age of eighteen, was a manager of a store in West Hartland, Connecticut. After a year, he went to New York City, to work with his brother as a bookkeeper, subsequently becoming his partner. He succeeded in business, and moved to South Norwalk in 1861.

== Business pursuits ==
Upon moving to South Norwalk, he became a banker, invested in real estate, becoming the largest landholder in the city. On the largest business block in the city, he built the Hotel Mahackemo. He was president of the Norwalk Gas Light Company for over twenty years. He was president of the South Norwalk Savings Bank for more than ten years. He was the first president of the Norwalk Iron Works Company and the first president of the South Norwalk Printing Company. He served as a director of the Danbury and Norwalk Railroad Company, the Norwalk Horse Railroad Company, the Fairfield County Fire Insurance Company, the Norwalk Fire Insurance Company, the Relief Fire Insurance Company of New York and the Peter Cooper Fire Insurance Company of New York.

He took a recreational interest in agriculture, and served as president of the Fairfield County Agricultural Society. At a farm he carried on in the suburbs, he raised chickens and pigeons.

He was a large donor to the Children's Aid Society, and a member of the Congregational church of South Norwalk.

He was the plaintiff in the case of Town of Andes v Ely in 1895.

Preceded by City incorporated	Mayor of South Norwalk, Connecticut; 1870–1872	Succeeded by Walter C. Quintard
Preceded by Walter C. Quintard	Mayor of South Norwalk, Connecticut; 1876–1877	Succeeded by Winfield S. Hanford
