= William C. Street =

American politician (1816–1893)

William Camp Street

11th Warden of the Borough of Norwalk, Connecticut
- In office 1860–1861
- Preceded by: Samuel Lynes
- Succeeded by: George R. Cholwell

Member of the Connecticut Senate from the 12th District
- In office 1867–1869
- Preceded by: Charles Ballard
- Succeeded by: Huested W. R. Hoyt

Member of the Connecticut House of Representatives from Norwalk
- In office 1863–1865 Serving with Joseph H. Jennings, Chester F. Tolles
- Preceded by: Josiah Carter, Ebenezer Hill
- Succeeded by: Chester F. Tolles, F. St. John Lockwood

Personal details
- Born: August 26, 1816 Norwalk, Connecticut
- Died: April 7, 1893 (aged 76)
- Party: Republican
- Spouse: Elizabeth A. Wilcoxson (m. August 11, 1846, Danbury, Connecticut)
- Children: Isabel, Helen, Franklin
- Occupation: hardware merchant

William Camp Street (August 7, 1816 – April 7, 1893) was a member of the Connecticut Senate representing the 12th District from 1867 to 1869 and a member of the Connecticut House of Representatives representing Norwalk from 1863 to 1865. He served as Warden of the Borough of Norwalk, Connecticut in 1860.

He was the son of William Jarvis Street and Sarah Camp. His father had owned a hardware business in Norwalk, and also served as Warden of the Borough of Norwalk. For some time, he was a business partner with William H. Smith, who also served as warden of Norwalk.

In 1849, he was one of the original incorporators of the Norwalk Savings Society.

In 1860, he was Warden of the Borough of Norwalk.

On October 26, 1876, he was elected to the board of directors of the Norwalk and Danbury Railroad.

In 1878, he was on the board of directors of the Norwalk Fire Insurance Company.

Preceded by Dimon Fanton	Warden of the Borough of Norwalk, Connecticut; 1860–1861	Succeeded by George R. Cholwell
Connecticut State Senate
Preceded by Charles Ballard	Member of the Connecticut Senate from the 12th District; 1867–1869	Succeeded by Huested W. R. Hoyt
Connecticut House of Representatives
Preceded by Josiah Carter; Ebenezer Hill	Member of the Connecticut House of Representatives from Norwalk; 1863–1865; With: Joseph H. Jennings, Chester F. Tolles	Succeeded by Chester F. Tolles; F. St. John Lockwood
