= Frank Zullo =

American lawyer (1932–2018)

Frank N. Zullo

31st Mayor of Norwalk, Connecticut
- In office 1965–1971
- Preceded by: Frank J. Cooke
- Succeeded by: Donald J. Irwin

Personal details
- Born: June 3, 1932 Norwalk, Connecticut
- Died: May 26, 2018 (aged 85) Norwalk, Connecticut
- Party: Democratic
- Spouse: Berenice F. Zullo
- Children: Lesley-Anne
- Education: Fordham University

Frank N. Zullo (June 3, 1932 – May 26, 2018) was a Democratic mayor of Norwalk, Connecticut. At 33, he was the youngest person to be elected mayor in Norwalk's history and the city's first Italian American mayor. He served three terms from 1965 to 1971.

== Early life ==
Zullo was born and raised in Norwalk, and graduated from Norwalk High School. He passed the Connecticut Bar exam while still in law school at Fordham University and began practicing law in 1957. He was named "Young Man of the Year" by the Norwalk Junior Chamber of Commerce in 1958. In 1959, he entered the partnership of Tierney & Zullo (today Tierney, Zullo, Flaherty and Murphy, P.C.). He married Berenice. He served as an officer in the 43rd Infantry Division of the Connecticut Army National Guard.

== Political career ==
Zullo ran for mayor in 1965. At 33, he was the youngest person to be elected mayor in Norwalk's history and the city's first Italian-American mayor. He served three terms from 1965 to 1971. He was campaign treasurer for Connecticut's senior United States senator, Christopher Dodd, beginning in 1980.

=== Mayoral administration ===
Zullo helped form and was president of the Connecticut Conference of Mayors. He served three years as a trustee and member of the executive board of the United States Conference of Mayors.

=== Post-mayoral career ===
He was chairman of the board of trustees and a life trustee of Norwalk Hospital from 1979 to 1981, and he served as a trustee almost continually since 1971, completing his last term in 2004. He served on the Board of Directors of Honey Hill Care Center since 1993 and on the hospital's foundation board from 1991 to 2010. A trustee of the University of Bridgeport since 1992, he served as board chairman in 1990 to 2000 and as co-chairman since 2001. He was a member of the Board of Trustees of the Maritime Aquarium at Norwalk since its inception and was board secretary.

From 1976 to 1993, Zullo was a director of VITAM, serving as its chairman from 1989 to 2001. He was a trustee of the YMCA of Norwalk for 33 years, and chaired its board for 12 years.

== Associations ==
- Prosecutor, Norwalk City Court, 1959–1960
- Minority Leader, Common Council, City of Norwalk, 1963–1965
- Chairman: United Fund Drive, 1963–1964, 1964–1965; President, United Fund, 1965–1966, 1973-1974
- Chairman, Board of Trustees, YMCA, 1987–1999
- Board of Trustees, Vitam, 1990–1992
- Member, Executive Committee, 1966–1971 and President, 1968–1969, Connecticut Conference of Mayors
- Member, Board of Trustees, 1971–1995, chairman, Board of Trustees, 1979–1982 and Counsel, 1987—, Norwalk Hospital
- State Trial Referee, 1984–1991
- Member, Board of Trustees, Maritime Aquarium at Norwalk, 1986—
- Tri-State Regional Planning Association, 1988–1995
- Selection Committee, Ettinger Scholarship Program, 1989—
- Member, Norwalk-Wilton Bar Association (President, 1996–1997) and American Bar Associations.
- Board of Trustees, Five Town Foundation, 1990–1997
- Member, 1991— and vice-chairman, 1994–1999, chairman, 1999—, Board of Trustees, University of Bridgeport
- Vice-chairman, Board of Directors, Honey Hill Care Center, 1993—.

== Awards ==
Zullo's honors and awards include:

- Young Man of the Year Award, Norwalk Junior Chamber of Commerce, 1958, 1963
- American Committee on Italian Migration
- Saint Ann's Club
- Norwalk Catholic Interracial Council
- Norwalk Jewish Center
- Connecticut Society of Architects
- Carver Foundation
- Association of Retarded Citizens
- Sons of Italy
- Boy Scouts of America
- Young Democratic Clubs of Connecticut
- Ma'ciison Sayles Community Service Award from the United Way of Norwalk & Wilton, and N.E.O.N.

== Legacy ==
- The aquatic facility at the YMCA was named in Zullo's honor.

Preceded by Frank J. Cooke	Mayor of Norwalk, Connecticut; 1965-1971	Succeeded by Donald J. Irwin
