= Edwin Adams (politician) =

American politician (1829-1908)

7th Mayor of South Norwalk, Connecticut
- In office 1881–1881
- Preceded by: Christian Swartz
- Succeeded by: Christian Swartz

Personal details
- Born: March 8, 1829 Salem, New York, U.S.
- Died: May 10, 1908 (aged 79) South Norwalk, Connecticut, U.S.
- Resting place: Riverside Cemetery; Norwalk, Connecticut, U.S.
- Spouse: Sarah E.
- Occupation: Hatter

Edwin Adams (March 8, 1829 – May 10, 1908) was a one-term mayor of South Norwalk, Connecticut, in 1881. He was one of the largest hat manufacturers in Connecticut.

== Biography ==
Adams was born on March 8, 1829, in Salem, New York. He worked as a country merchant. When he was about forty years old, he moved from New York to South Norwalk, Connecticut, to join his brother, Gehurdus P. Adams, in making hats. His brother was a member of the firm of Adams & Holmes. After the death of Mr. Holmes, the firm became known as Adams Brothers. When Edwin retired, he served as treasurer of the Hat Forming Company.

Adams became prominently identified with the affairs of South Norwalk soon after he located there, and in October 1880, he was elected mayor of the city, serving as its chief executive throughout the year 1881.

He served as the South Norwalk, Connecticut postmaster after Charles E. Doty was charged with embezzling in 1892.

Also in 1892, he served without compensation on a city committee with General Nelson Taylor and Joseph A. Volk that led to the construction of a municipally-owned electric power plant, the first such municipally owned utility in Connecticut.

He died in South Norwalk, Connecticut, from a stomach disease after a two-week illness on May 10, 1908. He is buried in Riverside Cemetery.

== Associations ==
- Member, Our Brothers' Lodge of Odd Fellows, Norwalk

Preceded by Christian Swartz	Mayor of South Norwalk, Connecticut; 1881–1881	Succeeded by Christian Swartz
