= Charles E. Dow =

American politician

Charles Elbert Dow

24th Mayor of South Norwalk, Connecticut
- In office 1903–1907
- Preceded by: John J. Cavanagh
- Succeeded by: Francis Burnell

Personal details
- Born: May 1846 New York
- Died: November 19, 1914 Norwalk, Connecticut
- Resting place: Long Ridge Union Cemetery; Stamford, Connecticut
- Party: Republican
- Spouse: Mary O. Randall
- Children: one

Military service
- Allegiance: United States Union
- Rank: private
- Unit: 17th Regiment
- Battles/wars: American Civil War

Charles Elbert Dow (1846 – November 19, 1914) was a Republican mayor of South Norwalk, Connecticut from 1903 to 1907. He was elected with the endorsement of both parties.

He was the son of John and Margaret Dow of New York. He married Mary O. Randall.

He enlisted from Danbury on September 7, 1864, in the Union Army during the American Civil War and served with Company B, 17th Connecticut Infantry Regiment and was discharged on July 19, 1865. He was a private.

Preceded by John J. Cavanagh	Mayor of South Norwalk, Connecticut; 1903–1907	Succeeded by Francis Burnell
