= Anson F. Keeler =

American politician (1887–1943)

Anson Foster Keeler

47th Connecticut State Comptroller
- In office 1933–1935
- Governor: Wilbur Lucius Cross
- Preceded by: Frederick M. Salmon
- Succeeded by: Charles C. Swartz

Member of the Connecticut Senate from the 26th district
- In office 1931–1933
- Preceded by: John D. Milne
- Succeeded by: John D. Milne

20th Mayor of Norwalk, Connecticut
- In office 1927–1931
- Preceded by: Thomas Robins
- Succeeded by: Harold L. Nash

Personal details
- Born: September 22, 1887 Brooklyn, New York, U.S.
- Died: September 29, 1943 (aged 56) Newington, Connecticut, U.S.
- Party: Republican
- Occupation: Laundry owner

Military service
- Branch/service: United States Army
- Battles/wars: World War I

Anson Foster Keeler (September 22, 1887 – September 29, 1943) was a Republican Connecticut State Comptroller from 1933 to 1935, and mayor of Norwalk, Connecticut, from 1927 to 1931. He served in the Connecticut Senate from the 26th district in 1931.

== Biography ==
Keeler was born on September 22, 1887, in Brooklyn, New York City. He was the son of John Foster Keeler and Mary Gazetta Foster. He was a descendant of Ralph Keeler, one of the founding settlers of Norwalk. He served in the U.S. Army during World War I.

He died on September 29, 1943, at the Veterans Hospital in Newington, Connecticut.

== Memberships ==
- Freemasons, Shriners, Elks, Moose, and Redmen

Preceded by Thomas Robins	Mayor of Norwalk, Connecticut; 1927–1931	Succeeded by Harold L. Nash
Preceded by John D. Milne	Member of the Connecticut Senate from the 26th District; 1931–1933	Succeeded by John D. Milne
Preceded by Frederick M. Salmon	Connecticut State Comptroller; 1933–1935	Succeeded by Charles C. Swartz
