= Thomas H. Morison =

American politician

Thomas Henry Morison
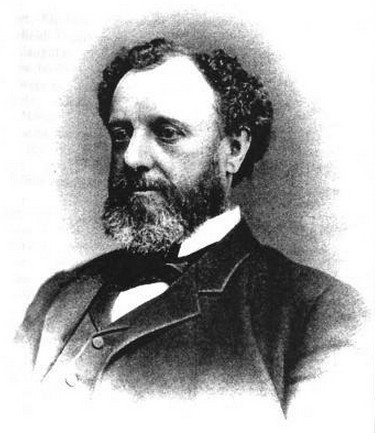

25th Warden of the Borough of Norwalk, Connecticut
- In office 1878–1880
- Preceded by: James W. Hyatt
- Succeeded by: James W. Hyatt

Personal details
- Born: August 24, 1838 Brooklyn, New York, US
- Died: February 10, 1884 (aged 45) Nassau, Bahamas
- Resting place: Union Cemetery, Norwalk, Connecticut
- Party: Democratic
- Spouse: Julia Anna Sheffield (m. November 17, 1863, Brooklyn)
- Children: Thomas Sheffield Morison, Charles Henry Morison, Frederick Ames Morison
- Occupation: manufacturer of shirts and collars

Thomas Henry Morison (August 24, 1838 – February 10, 1884) was Warden of the Borough of Norwalk, Connecticut from 1878 to 1880.

He was born on August 24, 1838, in Brooklyn, New York, the son of Thomas Ames Morison and Amy H. Hoyt.

In 1853, he went to work in his father's clothing store, and in 1858, he was made a partner. Eventually, he became the senior member of the firm of Morison & Hutchinson. In 1867, he came to Norwalk to take over the factory operations of the firm.

Morison also engaged in the gas business, banking, railroads, and fire insurance. He was elected a water commissioner.

Preceded by James W. Hyatt	Warden of the Borough of Norwalk, Connecticut; 1878–1880	Succeeded by James W. Hyatt
