= Ridgebury, Connecticut =

Census-designated place in Connecticut, United States

- Census-designated place
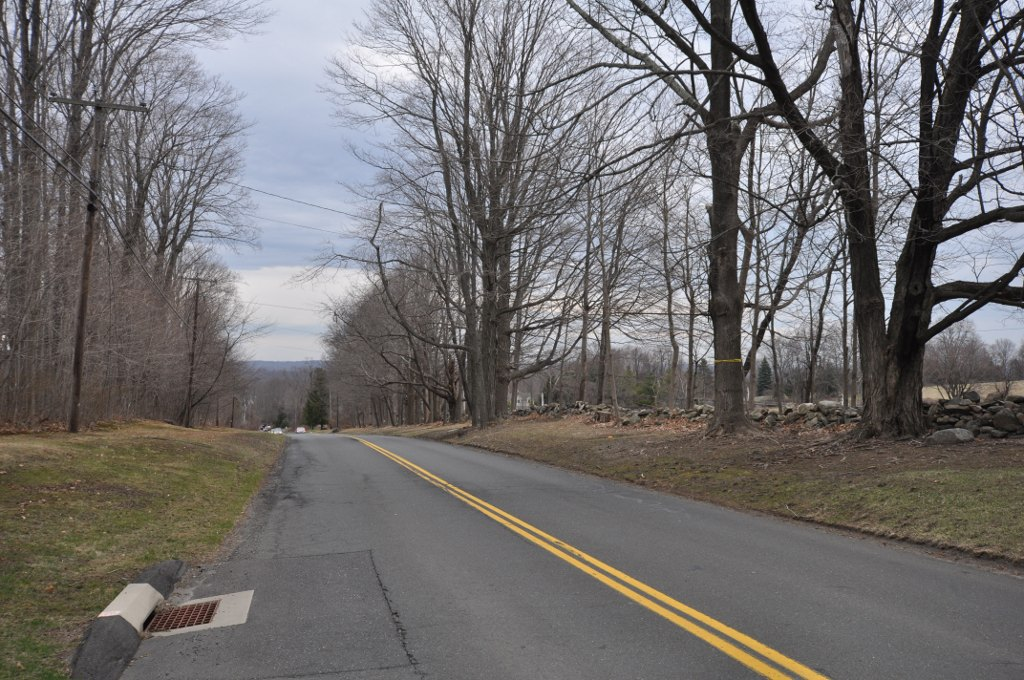
- Ridgebury Road; part of the historic Washington–Rochambeau Revolutionary Route

- Location within Connecticut Location within the United States
- Coordinates: 41°21′38″N 73°32′28″W
- Country: United States
- State: Connecticut
- County: Fairfield
- Town: Ridgefield

Area
  - Total: 5.49 sq mi (14.23 km^{2})
  - Land: 5.48 sq mi (14.20 km^{2})
  - Water: 0.0077 sq mi (0.02 km^{2})
- Elevation: 627 ft (191 m)
- Time zone: UTC-5 (Eastern (EST))
  - Summer (DST): UTC-4 (EDT)
- ZIP Code: 06877 (Ridgefield)
- Area codes: 203/475
- FIPS code: 09-63830
- GNIS feature ID: 2805961

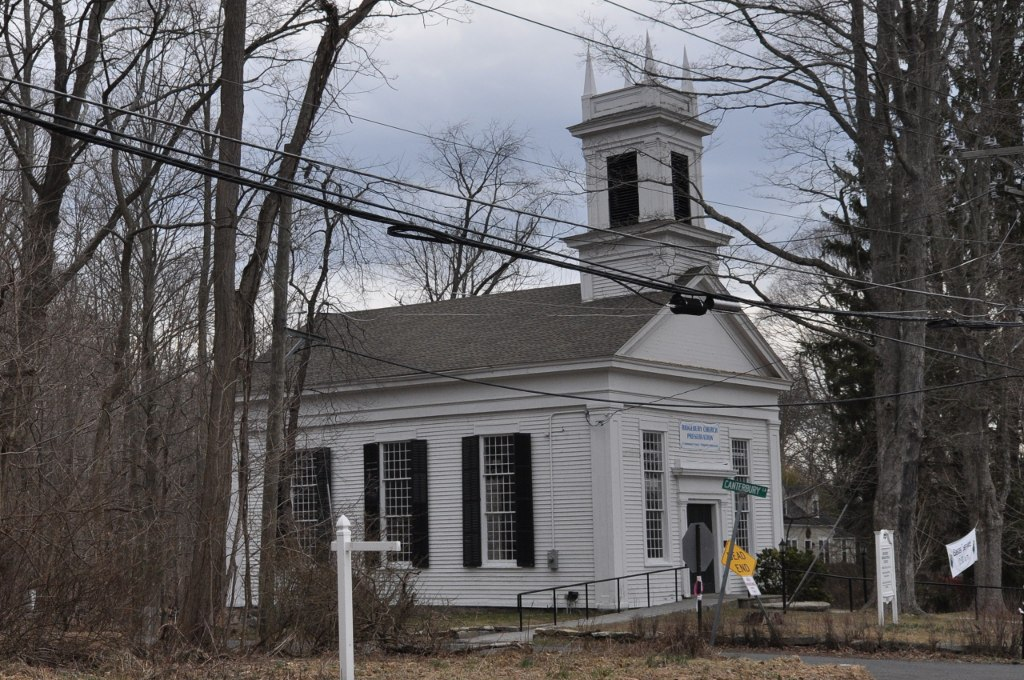
Ridgebury Congregational Church was founded in 1760

Ridgebury is a census-designated place (CDP) in the town of Ridgefield, Fairfield County, Connecticut, United States. It occupies the north end of the town of Ridgefield and is bordered to the north and northeast by the city of Danbury and to the west by Putnam and Westchester counties in New York. As of the 2020 census, Ridgebury had a population of 2,223.

The name is a portmanteau of Ridgefield and Danbury.

Ridgebury was first listed as a CDP prior to the 2020 census.

The area is home to an elementary school, Ridgebury Elementary School.

== Demographics ==
=== 2020 census ===
As of the 2020 census, Ridgebury had a population of 2,223. The median age was 43.0 years. 27.5% of residents were under the age of 18 and 13.5% of residents were 65 years of age or older. For every 100 females there were 94.3 males, and for every 100 females age 18 and over there were 90.8 males age 18 and over.

51.4% of residents lived in urban areas, while 48.6% lived in rural areas.

There were 701 households in Ridgebury, of which 46.9% had children under the age of 18 living in them. Of all households, 79.2% were married-couple households, 7.4% were households with a male householder and no spouse or partner present, and 10.6% were households with a female householder and no spouse or partner present. About 9.3% of all households were made up of individuals and 3.8% had someone living alone who was 65 years of age or older.

There were 752 housing units, of which 6.8% were vacant. The homeowner vacancy rate was 0.6% and the rental vacancy rate was 16.7%.

Racial composition as of the 2020 census
Race	Number	Percent
White	1,820	81.9%
Black or African American	32	1.4%
American Indian and Alaska Native	1	0.0%
Asian	185	8.3%
Native Hawaiian and Other Pacific Islander	0	0.0%
Some other race	30	1.3%
Two or more races	155	7.0%
Hispanic or Latino (of any race)	113	5.1%
