= William H. Smith (Connecticut politician) =

American politician

27th Warden of the Borough of Norwalk, Connecticut
- In office 1882–1885
- Preceded by: James W. Hyatt
- Succeeded by: James W. Hyatt

Personal details
- Born: June 11, 1842
- Died: February 19, 1915 (aged 72)
- Resting place: Union Cemetery, Norwalk, Connecticut
- Spouse: Emily V. Mallory Smith (1845 – 1932)
- Occupation: hardware merchant

William H. Smith (June 11, 1842 – February 19, 1915) was Warden of the Borough of Norwalk, Connecticut from 1882 to 1885.

He was the son of William Duff Smith and Susan E. Smith of Norwalk.

He was for some time in partnership with William C. Street in the hardware business.

He was a member of the Norwalk City Council in 1896.

== Associations ==
- Founding incorporator (1887), The Norwalk Club

Preceded by James W. Hyatt	Warden of the Borough of Norwalk, Connecticut; 1882–1885	Succeeded by James W. Hyatt
