= Arthur C. Wheeler =

Arthur Canfield Wheeler
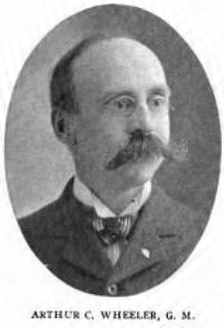

3rd Mayor of Norwalk, Connecticut
- In office 1895–1897
- Preceded by: James T. Hubbell
- Succeeded by: Charles L. Glover

Personal details
- Born: August 26, 1856 Norwalk, Connecticut
- Died: October 5, 1941 (aged 85) Norwalk, Connecticut
- Party: Republican
- Spouse: Susie Cousins
- Children: Ernest Cousins Wheeler, Harold Arthur Wheeler
- Occupation: hatter

Arthur Canfield Wheeler (August 26, 1856 – October 5, 1941) was a two-term Republican mayor of Norwalk, Connecticut from 1895 to 1896. He was a manufacturer of straw hats for over thirty years.

== Early life and family ==
He was born in Norwalk in August 1856 and attended public schools. He was the son of Charles H. Wheeler, and Anna Eliza Canfield Wheeler. He graduated at age 14. He soon thereafter joined John P. Beatty & Company, manufacturers of straw hats. On June 23, 1880, he married Susie Cousins. In September 1888, Wheeler took possession of the factory at 13 Butler Street, where he expanded the business and employed over 200 workers. He engaged in the hat manufacturing business until 1919. He conducted the Braid and Novelty Company until his death.

== Political career ==
When the Borough of Norwalk was first incorporated as a city in 1893, he was a member of the first City Council. He served on the City Council in 1888, 1894, and 1895. In 1895, he was elected mayor.

In 1902, he was a member of the Norwalk School Board, president of Hour Publishing Company, the publisher of the Norwalk Hour, and a member of the board of directors of the Fairfield County Savings Bank.

== Associations ==
- Freemasonry:
  - Member (1884), St. John's Lodge No. 6; Worshipful Master (1894–1896)
  - Grand Master of Connecticut (1902)
  - Member and High Priest, Washington Chapter of Norwalk Number 24
  - Knight (1891), Commander (1897), Clinton Commandery Number 3
  - 32nd Degree Member, Lafayette Consistory, S.P.R.S., A.A.S.R. of Bridgeport
  - Member, Pyramid Temple of the Mystic Shrine of Bridgeport
- Grand Patriarch, Odd Fellow of Connecticut
- Member, Norwalk Club
- Member, Algonquin Club of Bridgeport
- Member, Norwalk Kiwanis Club
- Member, Everyman's Bible Class
- Norwalk Braid Club

Preceded by James T. Hubbell	Mayor of Norwalk, Connecticut; 1895–1896	Succeeded by Charles L. Glover
