= Stiles Curtis =

American politician

5th Warden of the Borough of Norwalk, Connecticut
- In office 1845–1852
- Preceded by: William J. Street
- Succeeded by: Charles E. Disbrow

Personal details
- Born: February 15, 1805 Stratford, Connecticut
- Died: November 11, 1882 (aged 77) Norwalk, Connecticut
- Resting place: Union Cemetery, Norwalk, Connecticut
- Spouse(s): Hannah Whiting (m. October 3, 1830), Jane Isabella Whiting (m. September 23, 1838), Jane Hanson Bartow (m. April 16, 1867), Martha Abbott Hull (m. May 19, 1869)
- Occupation: manufacturer

Stiles Curtis (February 15, 1805 – November 11, 1882) was a Warden of the Borough of Norwalk, Connecticut from 1845 to 1853.

He was born in February 1805, in Stratford, Connecticut, the son of William Curtis, and Rebecca Judson.

From 1875 to 1892, he was president of the Bank of Norwalk.

| Preceded by William J. Street | Warden of the Borough of Norwalk, Connecticut; 1845–1852 | Succeeded by Charles E. Disbrow |
