= Asa Woodward =

American politician

Asa Burr Woodward

Member of the Connecticut Senate from the 12th District
- In office 1871–1873
- Preceded by: Elbert A. Woodward
- Succeeded by: Huested W. R. Hoyt

Member of the Connecticut House of Representatives from Norwalk
- In office 1867–1869 Serving with D. H. Webb, George S. Bell
- Preceded by: Ebenezer Hill, F. St. John Lockwood
- Succeeded by: Asa Smith, Israel Bullock

20th Warden of the Borough of Norwalk, Connecticut
- In office 1872–1873
- Preceded by: Samuel Lynes
- Succeeded by: Asa Smith

Personal details
- Born: March 31, 1830 Watertown, Connecticut
- Died: July 26, 1921 (aged 91) Norwalk, Connecticut
- Party: Republican
- Spouse: Sarah Esther Hanford (m. June 8, 1859, d. June 24, 1882)
- Children: Mary Hanford Woodward Earle, Sarah Lucia Woodward Hoyt, Anna Burr Woodward Hoyt, Harriet Isabel Woodward Earle, Louise Woodward Brinckerhoff, George Lucius Woodward
- Education: Yale College (1853)
- Occupation: lawyer and judge

Asa Burr Woodward (March 31, 1830 – July 26, 1921) was a member of the Connecticut Senate representing the 12th District from 1871 to 1873, a member of the Connecticut House of Representatives representing Norwalk from 1867 to 1869, and a Warden of the Borough of Norwalk in 1872.

He was born March 31, 1830, the son of Lucius and Lucia Burr Woodward.

He graduated from Yale College in 1853.

He worked in the law office of Orris S. Ferry. He was admitted to the bar in 1857.

He was a judge of probate for the Norwalk district beginning in 1878.

He served as President of the Fairfield County Savings Bank, a director of the South Norwalk Trust Company, and President of the Fairfield County Bar Association.

In 1902, he was a member of the Connecticut Constitutional Convention.

Preceded by Samuel Lynes	Warden of the Borough of Norwalk, Connecticut; 1872–1873	Succeeded by Asa Smith
Connecticut State Senate
Preceded by Elbert A. Woodward	Member of the Connecticut Senate from the 12th District; 1871–1873	Succeeded by Huested W. R. Hoyt
Connecticut House of Representatives
Preceded by Ebenezer Hill; F. St. John Lockwood	Member of the Connecticut House of Representatives from Norwalk; 1867–1869; With: D. H. Webb, George S. Bell	Succeeded by Asa Smith; Israel Bullock
