= James T. Hubbell =

American politician (1855–1929)

James Thaddeus Hubbell

2nd Mayor of Norwalk, Connecticut
- In office 1894–1895
- Preceded by: Edwin O. Keeler
- Succeeded by: Arthur C. Wheeler

Member of the Connecticut House of Representatives from Wilton
- In office 1882–1884

Personal details
- Born: March 17, 1855 Wilton, Connecticut
- Died: 1929
- Resting place: Union Cemetery; Norwalk, Connecticut
- Party: Democratic
- Spouse: Mary Clinton Clark (m. June 22, 1888)
- Children: Clinton Clark Hubbell (b. 1889), John Samuel (d. infancy), Helen C.(b. 1894)
- Education: Wilton Academy
- Occupation: lawyer

James Thaddeus Hubbell (1855–1929) was a one-term Democratic mayor of Norwalk, Connecticut from 1894 to 1895. He served as a judge of the town court, and as a member of the Connecticut House of Representatives representing Wilton in 1882 and 1883.

== Family ==
He was the son of John William Hubbell and Mary Merwin.

== Associations ==
- Member, Worshipful Master (1908), St. Johns Lodge Number 6 Free and Accepted Masons

Preceded by Edwin O. Keeler	Mayor of Norwalk, Connecticut; 1894–1895	Succeeded by Arthur C. Wheeler
