= Samuel Daskam =

American politician

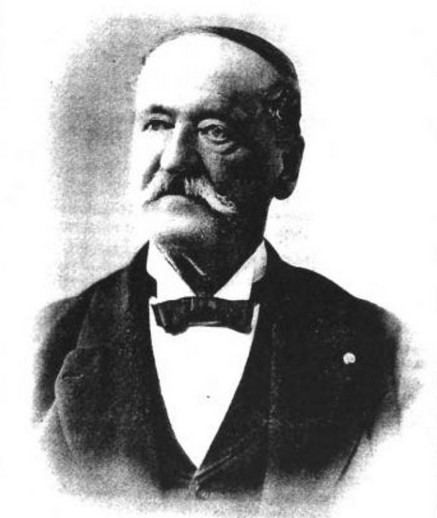

23rd Warden of the Borough of Norwalk, Connecticut
- In office 1874–1877
- Preceded by: Edward P. Weed
- Succeeded by: James W. Hyatt

Personal details
- Born: January 31, 1823 Norwalk, Connecticut
- Died: October 24, 1912 (aged 89) Norwalk, Connecticut
- Resting place: East Norwalk Historical Cemetery, Norwalk, Connecticut
- Party: Democratic
- Spouse: Arietta May Rogers (m. October 4, 1847)
- Children: Ida A. (died in infancy) Jennie May Daskham Stevens
- Education: Lovell's School in New Haven
- Occupation: jeweler, station master
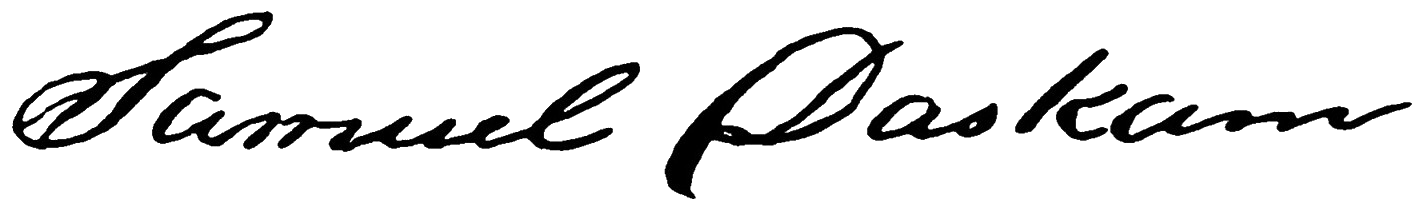
- Signature

Military service
- Branch/service: Connecticut National Guard
- Unit: Company D "National Blues"

Samuel Daskam (January 31, 1823 – October 24, 1912) was Warden of the Borough of Norwalk, Connecticut from 1874 to 1877.

== Early life and family ==
He was the son of Captain Samuel Daskam and Lucretia Fitch. His grandfather William Daskam served as a private during the American Revolutionary War. His mother was grand-niece of Governor Thomas Fitch. He studied at Lovell's School in New Haven, Connecticut and later found employment at a big jewelry store there.

On October 4, 1847, he married Arrietta M. Rogers, daughter of Colonel Henry Rogers. After their marriage, they moved to Troy, New York where he purchased a jewelry store. In 1855, he moved his store to Maiden Lane in Manhattan, New York City. After a time, they moved to Ridgefield, Connecticut, where he was rail station master.

== Public service ==
- In 1842 he led the Connecticut National Guard Company D. (known as the "National Blues") from New Haven to Boston
- In 1846, he was one of the five marshals appointed to receive James K. Polk, President of the United States, and James Buchanan, Secretary of State, on the occasion of the public dinner held at the Tontin Hotel
- In 1875, he was elected warden of the borough of Norwalk, and again in 1876.
- In 1888-89-90-91-92-93 and ‘94 he was a selectmen of Norwalk.
- In 1896 he was one of the managers of the State Society, Sons of the American Revolution
- In 1897, he was elected delegate to the National convention, Sons of the American Revolution, at Morristown, N.J.
- In 1898, was elected a delegate to the National Society's convention, Sons of the American Revolution, at Detroit, Michigan

== Later life ==
When Daskam moved his jewelry store from Troy to Manhattan, he was accompanied by an apprentice named Peter Sheridan. After becoming established at his new location, Daskam decided to open a second shop at the corner of Sixth Avenue and Twelfth Street. He put Sheridan in charge, but one morning he found that his former apprentice had disappeared along with much of the new store's inventory. Daskam reported the incident to the police, but about six months later it was determined than Sheridan had died before he could be apprehended. In 1891, Sheridan's half brother Joseph Sheridan paid Daskam $2,000 at the urging of his dying sister as compensation for their brother's crime.

In retirement, Daskam continued to live in Norwalk. He died on October 24, 1912.

Preceded by Edward P. Weed	Warden of the Borough of Norwalk, Connecticut; 1874–1877	Succeeded by James W. Hyatt
