= Irving Freese =

American politician (1903–1964)

Irving C. Freese
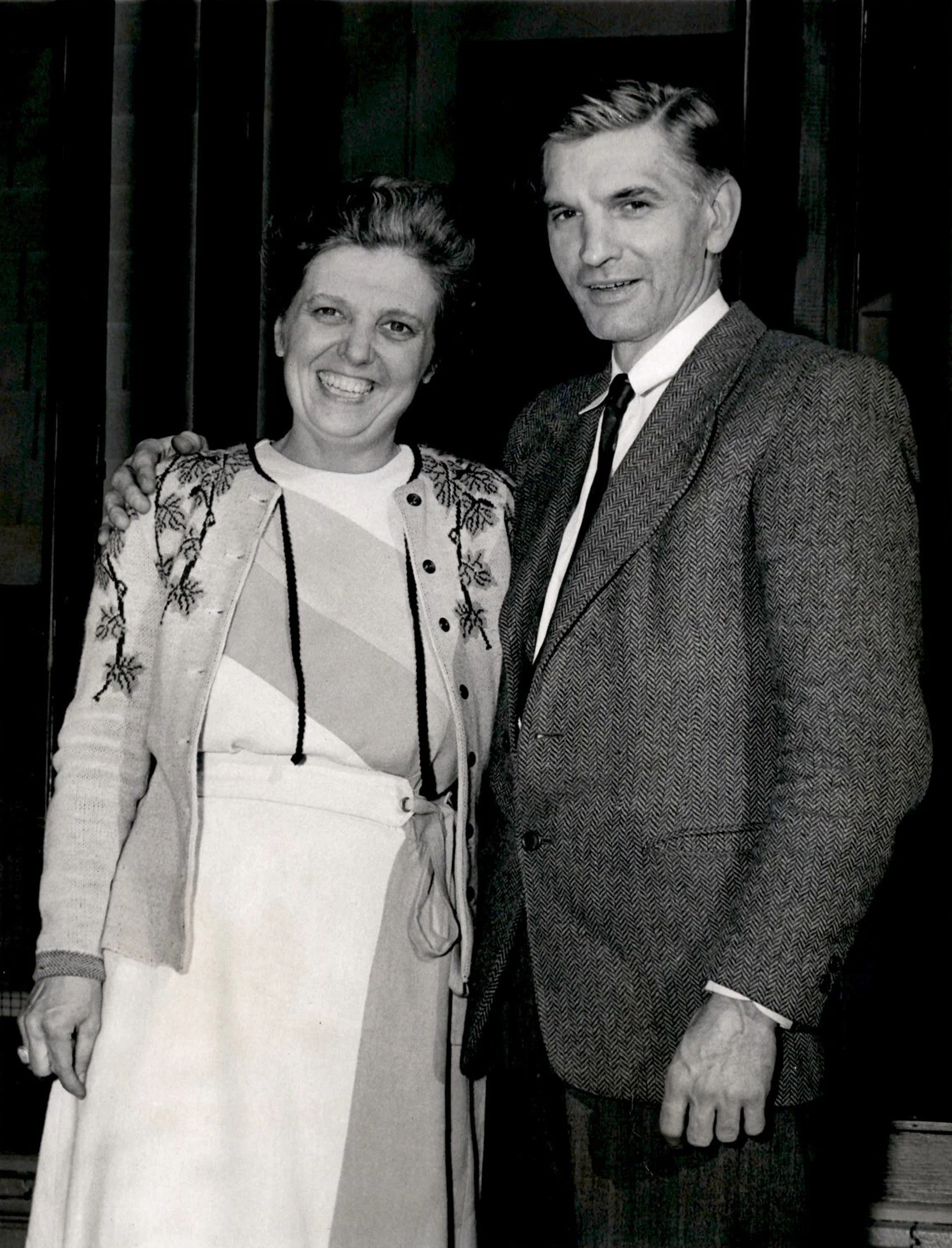
- Freese and his wife, 1947

26th and 28th Mayor of Norwalk, Connecticut
- In office 1947–1955
- Preceded by: Edward J. Kelley
- Succeeded by: George Brunjes
- In office 1957–1959
- Preceded by: George Brunjes
- Succeeded by: John Shostak

Personal details
- Born: February 19, 1903 East Brunswick, New Jersey
- Died: September 11, 1964 (aged 61) Norwalk, Connecticut
- Party: Socialist Party of America; Independent Party of Norwalk
- Spouse: Elizabeth Hutchinson
- Children: Jasper Freese

Irving C. Freese (February 19, 1903 – September 11, 1964) was the mayor of Norwalk, Connecticut.

== Life and family ==
Freese attended a one-room school in East Brunswick, New Jersey, and was graduated from New Brunswick High School. He first came to Norwalk in 1928, while visiting his brother Arnold. He found work as the assistant credit manager at the Norwalk Tire and Rubber Company, as a Johnson & Johnson salesman, as a cost accountant at the American Hat Company, and at the Standard Safety Razor Corporation as a credit manager. He later started a photography business. In October 1933, he met Elizabeth Hutchinson, the niece of the newly elected mayor of nearby Bridgeport, Jasper McLevy at his victory party. They were married in June 1934. They had a son they named Jasper, after her uncle, in August 1936.

== Political career ==
Freese was an unsuccessful candidate for mayor in 1939, 1941, 1943 and 1945. In those unsuccessful elections, he received between 400 and 600 votes apiece. Then he was a candidate for the Connecticut House of Representatives from Norwalk in 1946.

In 1947, the citizens of Norwalk elected Socialist Freese as mayor with a total of 8,561 votes. Freese was elected again as a Socialist in 1949. In 1951, he broke from the Socialist Party and defeated Republican candidate Stanley Stroffolino, despite Stroffolino's endorsement by the Republicans, the Democrats and the Socialists with whom Freese had just parted company. He was elected three times after forming the Independent Party of Norwalk in 1951, 1953 and 1957.

== Legacy ==
- Irving Freese Park at 1 Main Street in downtown Norwalk is named for him.
- Troop 19, the oldest Boy Scout Troop in Norwalk, was founded on March 3, 1930 by Freese
- The Irving Freese Apartments, a public housing residence at 57 Ward Street, as well as the Irving Freese Community Room at the same location are named for him.

== See also ==
- List of elected socialist mayors in the United States

Preceded by Edward J. Kelley	Mayor of Norwalk, Connecticut; 1947-1955	Succeeded by George Brunjes
Preceded by George Brunjes	Mayor of Norwalk, Connecticut; 1957-1959	Succeeded by John Shostak
