= Harry Rilling =

American politician

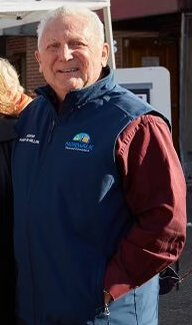
- Rilling in 2021

40th Mayor of Norwalk, Connecticut
- In office 2013 – January 2, 2026
- Preceded by: Richard A. Moccia
- Succeeded by: Barbara Smyth

Personal details
- Born: Harry W. Rilling; August 6, 1947 (age 78) Norwalk, Connecticut, U.S.
- Party: Democratic
- Spouse(s): Cheryl A. Cocco (m. 1969; div. 1993) Wanda J. Crespo (m. 2001) Lucia C. Medower (m. 2013)
- Children: 3
- Education: Norwalk High School
- Alma mater: Iona College (B.S., Criminal Justice, 1989), University of New Haven (Masters in Public Administration, 1991)

Harry W. Rilling (born August 6, 1947) is an American politician who previously served as mayor of Norwalk, Connecticut. He had previously served as Norwalk's police chief for 17 years before retiring. He is a Democrat, and was elected in 2013. Rilling defeated incumbent mayor Richard A. Moccia. On March 3, 2025, Rilling announced that he would not be seeking re-election and was succeeded by fellow Democrat Barbara Smyth.

== Early life and education ==
Rilling was born in Norwalk, Connecticut, on August 6, 1947, to Harry S. and Mary L. Rilling. He spent his early childhood partially in New Canaan, but was primarily raised in Norwalk. His father was a greenhouse worker while his mother was a homemaker. He has an elder brother and sister. Rilling graduated from Norwalk High School in 1965.

He has a Bachelor of Science in criminal justice, summa cum laude, from Iona College, and a Master in Public Administration from the University of New Haven. He is a graduate of the FBI Executive Development Course.

== Career ==
He enlisted in the United States Navy in 1967, and was honorably discharged in 1971 with the rank of E-5. He joined the Norwalk Police Department in 1971 and rose to the rank of chief in 1995, a position he held until his retirement in 2012. He served on the Norwalk Zoning Commission from 2012 until his election as mayor in 2013. From 1996 to 2004, Rilling was an adjunct professor of criminal justice at Norwalk Community College.

Rilling was an on-site assessor and team leader with the Commission on Accreditation for Law Enforcement Agencies (CALEA); he is a past chairman of the Mid-Fairfield Substance Abuse Coalition (MFSAC); past president of both the Fairfield County Chiefs of Police Association (FCCP) and the Connecticut Police Chiefs Association (CPCA); he is a Life member of the International Association of Chiefs of Police (IACP); and he is a board member of the National Committee on Narcotics and Dangerous Drugs (a committee of the Drug Enforcement Administration). Rilling served as Norwalk's Police Union president in 1976.

On March 3, 2025, Rilling announced that he would not seek a seventh term in that year's election.

== Personal life ==
Rilling was married three times. He first married Cheryl A. Cocco on January 4, 1969 with whom he had three children, and divorced in 1993. On October 30, 2001, he married Wanda J. Crespo. Rilling married his third wife Lucia C. Medower (b. 1963) in November 2013. He has three children from his first marriage.

His daughter, Christine Limone (née Rilling), a former day care operator, has been charged in the death of a toddler in her care in 2020. She has been offered a plea deal by state prosecutors. His son, Stephen Rilling, a former Fairfield Police detective has been arrested and charged in a narcotics arrest.

== Electoral history ==
2013 Norwalk Mayor election
Party	Candidate	Votes	%	±%
Democratic	Harry Rilling	8,639	52.3%	+8.7
Working Families	Harry Rilling	367	2.2%	−1.3
Total	Harry Rilling	9,006	54.5%	
Republican	Richard Moccia	7,514	45.5%	−7.4
Total votes		16,520	100%	
Democratic gain from Republican				

2015 Norwalk Mayor election
Party	Candidate	Votes	%	±%
Democratic	Harry Rilling	8,052	60.7%	+8.4
Working Families	Harry Rilling	321	2.4%	+0.2
Total	Harry Rilling	8,373	63.1%	
Republican	Kelly L. Straniti	4,896	36.9%	−8.6
Total votes		13,269	100%	
Democratic hold				

2017 Norwalk Mayor election
Party	Candidate	Votes	%	±%
Democratic	Harry Rilling	7,627	53.3%	−7.4
Working Families	Harry Rilling	307	2.1%	−0.3
Total	Harry Rilling	7,934	55.4%	
Independent	Lisa M. Brinton	3,264	22.8%	
Republican	Andrew T. Conroy	2,201	15.4%	−21.5
Independent	Bruce V. Morris	915	6.4%	
Total votes		14,314	100%	
Democratic hold				

2019 Norwalk Mayor election
Party	Candidate	Votes	%	±%
Democratic	Harry Rilling	8,397	53.1%	−0.2
Working Families	Harry Rilling	385	2.4%	+0.3
Total	Harry Rilling	8,782	55.5%	
Republican	Lisa M. Brinton	7,047	44.5%	+29.1
Total votes		15,829	100%	
Democratic hold				

2021 Norwalk Mayor election
Party	Candidate	Votes	%	±%
Democratic	Harry Rilling	8,665	60.9%	+7.8
Working Families	Harry Rilling	387	2.7%	+0.3
Total	Harry Rilling	9,052	63.6%	
Republican	Jonathan Riddle	5,180	36.4%	−8.1
Total votes		14,232	100%	
Democratic hold				

2023 Norwalk Mayor election
Party	Candidate	Votes	%	±%
Democratic	Harry Rilling	8,026	53.1%	−7.8
Working Families	Harry Rilling	358	2.4%	−0.3
Total	Harry Rilling	8,384	55.5%	
Republican	Vincent Scicchitano	6,735	44.6%	+8.2
Total votes		15,119	100%	
Democratic hold				

Political offices
Preceded by Richard A. Moccia	Mayor of Norwalk, Connecticut; 2013-present	Succeeded by incumbent
