= Charles E. Disbrow =

American politician (1812–1853)

Charles Edwin Disbrow

6th Warden of the Borough of Norwalk, Connecticut
- In office 1852–1853
- Preceded by: Stiles Curtis
- Succeeded by: Samuel Lynes

Personal details
- Born: November 5, 1812 Westport, Connecticut
- Died: November 3, 1853 (aged 40) Connecticut
- Resting place: Union Cemetery, Norwalk, Connecticut
- Spouse(s): Abigail Ann Knight Disbrow (m. October 13, 1835, First Church in New Haven, New Haven)
- Children: Emily, Louisa, and Charles E. Disbrow, Jr.
- Occupation: silversmith, jeweler

Charles Edwin Disbrow (November 5, 1812 – November 3, 1853) was Warden of the Borough of Norwalk, Connecticut from 1852 to 1853. He worked from 1815 to 1850 as a silversmith and jeweller in Norwalk. He was the son of Caleb Disbrow and Martha Greene.

| Preceded by Stiles Curtis | Warden of the Borough of Norwalk, Connecticut; 1852–1853 | Succeeded by Samuel Lynes |
