= Ira Gregory =

American physician (1804–1872)

Ira Gregory (January 31, 1804 – September 2, 1872) was an American physician and politician.

Gregory graduated from Yale Medical School in 1868. He began the study of medicine under Dr. David Willard, of Norwalk, and alter receiving his degree settled in Moriches, New York, where he practiced his profession for some twelve years. He then removed to Norwalk, where he continued in practice until within a few weeks of his death. He was also especially influential in all the educational interests of the town, being for many years chairman of the Board of Education. He often represented Norwalk in the Connecticut State Legislature. At the time of his death he was the President of the Medical Society of Fairfield County, and the Vice-President of the Connecticut Medical Society. Dr Gregory married soon after his removal to Norwalk. One son, James G. Gregory, graduated Yale in 1865, and followed his father's profession.
