= Edwin O. Keeler =

American politician

Edwin Olmstead Keeler
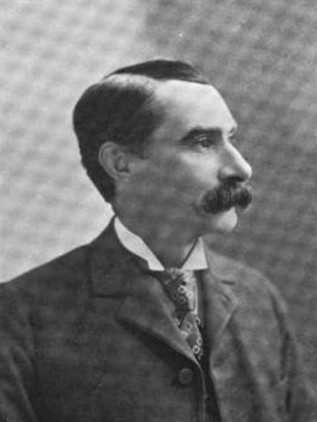

69th Lieutenant Governor of Connecticut
- In office January 9, 1901 – January 7, 1903
- Governor: George P. McLean
- Preceded by: Lyman A. Mills
- Succeeded by: Henry Roberts

Member of the Connecticut Senate from the 12th District
- In office 1897–1900
- Preceded by: George E. Lounsbury

Member of the Connecticut House of Representatives from Norwalk
- In office 1893–1896

1st Mayor of Norwalk, Connecticut
- In office 1893–1894
- Preceded by: Office established
- Succeeded by: James T. Hubbell

Personal details
- Born: January 12, 1846 Ridgefield, Connecticut
- Died: December 4, 1923 (aged 77) Norwalk, Connecticut
- Party: Republican
- Spouse: Sarah Velina Whiting
- Occupation: grocer, banker

Edwin Olmstead Keeler (January 12, 1846 in Ridgefield – December 4, 1923) was an American banker and Republican Lieutenant Governor of Connecticut from 1901 to 1903.

He had previously served as the first mayor of Norwalk, Connecticut from 1893 to 1894. He was a member of the Connecticut House of Representatives from 1893 to 1896, and was a member of the Connecticut Senate representing the 12th District from 1897 to 1900. He served as President pro tempore of the Connecticut Senate. He served as a delegate to the Republican National Convention from Connecticut in 1896.

== Early life and family ==
He was the son of Jonah Charles Keeler (1808-1873) and Henrietta Olmstead. Prior to his political career, he was a banker. On May 13, 1868, he married Sarah Velina Whiting. He was of English ancestry, all of which has been in the country since the colonial period. His earliest ancestor in America was Ralph Keeler, one of the founding settlers of Norwalk, who came from England to Hartford, Connecticut in 1640.

Preceded by Office established	Mayor of Norwalk, Connecticut; 1893—1894	Succeeded by James T. Hubbell
Preceded by Lyman A. Mills	Lieutenant Governor of Connecticut; 1901—1903	Succeeded by Henry Roberts
