= Charles C. Swartz =

American politician (1875–1947)

Charles Christian Swartz

48th Connecticut State Comptroller
- In office January 1, 1935 – 1939
- Governor: George Howard Earle III
- Preceded by: Anson F. Keeler
- Succeeded by: Fred R. Zeller

22nd Mayor of Norwalk, Connecticut
- In office 1933–1935
- Preceded by: Harold L. Nash
- Succeeded by: Frank T. Stack

Personal details
- Born: December 5, 1875 South Norwalk, Connecticut
- Died: July 26, 1947 (aged 71) Norwalk, Connecticut
- Party: Democratic
- Parent: Christian Swartz

Charles Christian Swartz (December 1875 – July 26, 1947) was a Democratic Connecticut State Comptroller from 1935 to 1939. He was a one term mayor of Norwalk, Connecticut, from 1933 to 1935.

== Biography ==
He was born in South Norwalk, Connecticut, on December 5, 1875, to Christian Swartz, the 6th and 8th mayor of South Norwalk, Connecticut, and Adora Flynn Swartz.

He attended Yale University and graduated in 1900. He then took a single course in mining engineering at the Columbia School of Engineering and Applied Science.

He died on July 26, 1947, in Norwalk, Connecticut.

== Memberships ==
He was a member of the South Norwalk Lodge of the Loyal Order of Moose.

Preceded by Anson F. Keeler	Connecticut State Comptroller; 1935–1939	Succeeded by Fred R. Zeller
Preceded by Harold L. Nash	Mayor of Norwalk, Connecticut; 1933–1935	Succeeded by Frank T. Stack
