= Frank T. Stack =

American mayor (1891–1956)

Frank Thomas Stack

23rd Mayor of Norwalk, Connecticut
- In office 1935–1943
- Preceded by: Charles C. Swartz
- Succeeded by: Robert B. Oliver

Personal details
- Born: August 26, 1891 Manhattan, New York City
- Died: October 21, 1956 (aged 65) Norwalk, Connecticut
- Resting place: Riverside Cemetery
- Party: Democratic
- Spouse: Catherine A. Stack
- Children: Thomas F. Stack, Rosemary Stack McMahon, Dorothea Stack Monahan, Patrick Stack
- Occupation: factory supervisor, businessman

Frank Thomas Stack (August 26, 1891 – October 21, 1956) was a four-term Democratic mayor of Norwalk, Connecticut from 1935 to 1943.

== Biography ==
He was born on August 26, 1891, in Manhattan, New York City to Theresa and Thomas Stack.

He was a plant supervisor at the Hat Corporation of America. He also owned the Stack Hats Company. In response to the Cavanagh Edge, a method of creating a firm edge on hats, Stack invented a two-piece iron that forced the felt along the edge of a hat brim into a groove during the ironing process, thereby creating a beaded edge during the finishing process.

He died on October 21, 1956, in Norwalk, Connecticut. He was buried in Riverside Cemetery in Norwalk, Connecticut.

Preceded by Charles C. Swartz	Mayor of Norwalk, Connecticut; 1935–1943	Succeeded by Robert B. Oliver
