= Ruth Chrisman Gannett =

American book illustrator (1896–1979)

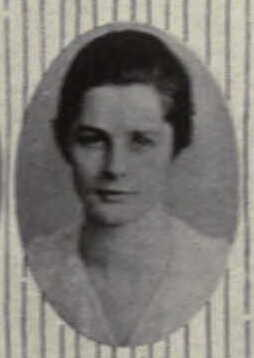
- Born: December 16, 1896; Santa Ana
- Died: December 8, 1979 (aged 82); West Cornwall
- Occupation: Illustrator
- Spouse(s): Lewis Gannett

Ruth Chrisman Gannett (December 16, 1896 – December 8, 1979) was an American book illustrator. She was the illustrator of several award winning books, including the Newbery Medal winner Miss Hickory (1946) by Carolyn Sherwin Bailey, the Newbery Honor book My Father's Dragon (1948) by her stepdaughter Ruth Stiles Gannett, and the Caldecott Honor book My Mother Is the Most Beautiful Woman in the World (1945) by Becky Reyher.

== Life and career ==
Ruth Chrisman was born on December 16, 1896 in Santa Ana, California, the daughter of Ernest L. Chrisman and Edith Hogle Chrisman. She earned an A.B. and A.M. from the University of California Berkeley is 1919 and 1920. She also studied at the Art Students' League Her teachers included Winold Reiss, Norman Bel Geddes, and Adolfo Best Maugard.

Most of Gannett's work was illustrating children's books, and her work on My Mother Is the Most Beautiful Woman in the World (1945), Miss Hickory (1946), and My Father's Dragon (1948) was singled out for critical praise. She also illustrated a number of adult novels, including Tortilla Flat (1937) by John Steinbeck

Ruth Chrisman Gannett died on 8 December 1979 in West Cornwall, Connecticut.

== Personal life ==
Gannett married twice. Her first husband was industrial designer Egmont Arens. Her second husband was Lewis Stiles Gannett, author, journalist, and critic.

== Bibliography ==
- Sweet Land (1934) by Lewis Stiles Gannett
- The Home Place (1936) by Dorothy Thomas
- Prairie Girl (1937) by Lucile F. Fargo
- Tortilla Flat (1937) by John Steinbeck
- Paco Goes to the Fair: A Story of Far-Away Ecuador (1940) by Richard C. Gill and Helen Hoke
- Hi-Po the Hippo (1942) by D. Thomas
- My Mother Is the Most Beautiful Woman in the World (1945) by Becky Reyher
- Miss Hickory (1946) by Carolyn Sherwin Bailey
- My Father's Dragon (1948) by Ruth Stiles Gannett
- Cream Hill: Discoveries of a Week-End Countryman (1949) by Lewis Stiles Gannett
- Elmer and the Dragon (1950) by Ruth Stiles Gannett
- The Dragons of Blueland (1951) by Ruth Stiles Gannett
