= Mary Bunting =

Educator

- Born: Mary Ingraham; July 10, 1910; Brooklyn, New York
- Died: January 21, 1998 (aged 87); Hanover, New Hampshire
- Occupations: Microbiologist; college president
- Spouse(s): Henry Bunting, M.D. (m. 1937–1954) (deceased); Clement Smith, M.D. (1975–1988) (deceased)
- Children: Four
- Parent(s): Henry A. Ingraham; Mary Shotwell Ingraham

Mary Ingraham Bunting (July 10, 1910 – January 21, 1998) was a bacterial geneticist and an influential American college president; Time profiled her as the magazine's November 3, 1961, cover story. She became Radcliffe College's fifth president in 1960 and was responsible for fully integrating women into Harvard University.

== Personal life ==
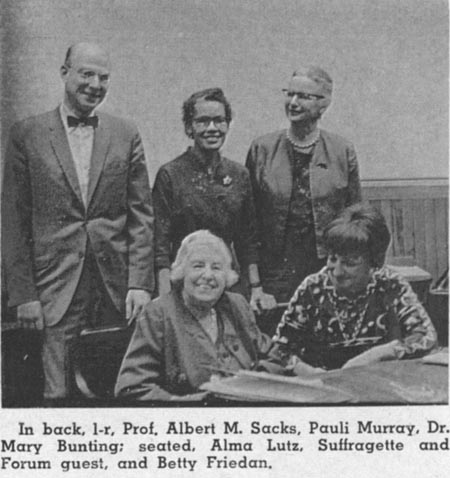
back, l to r, Prof. Albert M. Sacks, Pauli Murray, Dr. Mary Bunting; seated, l to r, Alma Lutz, suffragette and Harvard Law School Forum Guest, and Betty Friedan

Bunting was born in Brooklyn, New York, to Henry A. and Mary Shotwell Ingraham; she was known as "Polly" to distinguish her from her mother. Her father was an attorney; her mother was the head of the national YWCA and helped found the USO during World War II. Bunting graduated from Vassar College in 1931, and earned master's (1932) and doctoral degrees (1934) from the University of Wisconsin–Madison in agricultural bacteriology. While a student in Wisconsin, she was flatmates with Amelia Frank.

While at Wisconsin, she met Henry Bunting, then a medical student, who went on to teach pathology at the Yale University School of Medicine. They married in 1937, and had one daughter and three sons. He died of brain cancer in 1954. In 1975, Bunting married Clement A. Smith, a professor of pediatrics at Harvard Medical School; he died in 1988.

== Professional life ==
Bunting, a microbiologist who did work in bacterial genetics, taught and conducted research at Bennington College, Goucher College, Yale University, and Wellesley College before becoming dean, in 1955, of Douglass College, the women's school at Rutgers University in New Jersey. She was named president of Radcliffe in 1960. The same year, she was elected a Fellow of the American Academy of Arts and Sciences.

Once at Radcliffe, Bunting gained national attention for identifying a societal problem she called a "climate of unexpectation" for girls, which resulted in "the waste of highly talented educated womanpower." She told Time:

'Adults ask little boys what they want to do when they grow up. They ask little girls where they got that pretty dress. We don't care what women do with their education.'

Bunting brought change to Radcliffe. During her tenure, Radcliffe women began to receive Harvard degrees, women were admitted to the university's graduate and business schools, and the Radcliffe Graduate School merged with Harvard's Graduate School of Arts and Sciences. She also founded the Radcliffe Institute for Independent Study, a multidisciplinary postgraduate center of advanced studies for women; it was later renamed the Bunting Institute in her honor.

Bunting was named "Outstanding Woman of the Year" in the field of education by Who's Who, and received the National Institute of Social Scientists' gold medal in 1962. In 1964, Bunting took a leave of absence from Radcliffe to serve on the U.S. Atomic Energy Commission; she was the first woman to ever do so. Bunting was a member of the American Academy of Arts & Sciences, and was awarded over a dozen honorary degrees. Smith College, Southern Methodist University, and the University of Vermont are a few of the schools to have honored her.

She left Radcliffe in 1972, and became special assistant to the president of Princeton University, where she remained until 1975. She retired to Cambridge, Massachusetts, and then to New Hampshire, where she died in 1998.

== See also ==
- Radcliffe College History
- Radcliffe Institute for Advanced Study

== Other sources ==
- Elaine Yaffe, Mary Ingraham Bunting: Her Two Lives , Frederic C. Beil, 2005.
- Significant Dates in Radcliffe's History
