= Alma Lutz =

American suffragist

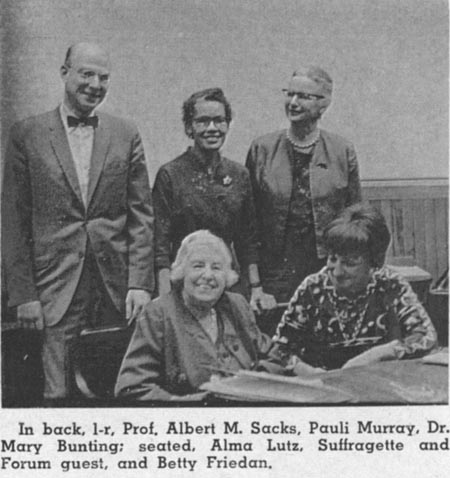
Standing, l. to r.: Prof. Albert M. Sacks, Pauli Murray, Dr. Mary Bunting; Seated, l. to r.: Alma Lutz, suffragette [sic] and Harvard Law School Forum Guest, and Betty Friedan

Alma Lutz (1890–1973) was an American feminist and activist for equal rights and woman suffrage. She was also the biographer of key women in the women's rights movement.

== Early life ==
Alma Lutz was born in Jamestown, North Dakota to Mathilde (Bauer) and George Lutz in 1890. She attended the Emma Willard School (class 1908) and then went to Vassar College. At Vassar she was active in the feminist movement and after graduation in 1912 she went back to North Dakota where she continued campaigning for women's suffrage.

== Career ==
Lutz moved to Boston in 1918, where she attended the Boston University School of Business Administration. She joined the National Woman's Party as one of their writers and at the same time specialized in biographies of women with a prominent role in American history. Activism and historical studies became her lifelong interests.

In 1938 Lutz was appointed editor of the National Woman's Party's official organ. She was also a contributor to The Christian Science Monitor and a member of the National Woman's Party's national council, a position she held for many years.

She was also affiliated with Schlesinger Library (advisory committee), Notable American Women (consultant), Massachusetts State Equal Rights Amendment Coalition (secretary).

Lutz was a teacher at Radcliffe College where she held a graduate seminar on Women in American History.

== Personal life ==
At Vassar, Lutz met Marguerite Smith (died July 6, 1959), her roommate. They both became National Woman's Party members and shared a house in Boston and a summer home, Highmeadow, in Berlin, New York, from 1918 until Smith's death in 1959. Berlin was the place where Susan B. Anthony addressed a gathering of suffragists with the words: "Let the people everywhere know that in Berlin women from all parts of the world have banded themselves together to demand political freedom." Friends from the National Woman's Party, Mabel Vernon and Consuelo Reyes-Calderon, used to spend summers at Highmeadow.

Smith was a librarian at the Protestant Zion Research Library in Brookline, Massachusetts. Lutz wrote about their life together: "We are very happy here in the country – each busy with her work and digging in the garden". (Alma Lutz to Florence Kitchelt, July 1948.) During the 1950s, Lutz and Smith often travelled to Europe. Smith died in 1959 and a deeply affected Lutz wrote: "I am at Highmeadow trying to get my bearings... You will understand how hard it is... It has been a very difficult anxious time for me".(Alma Lutz to Florence Kitchelt, July 1959)

Lutz and Smith are included among the historical couples of the suffragist movement, which also include Katharine Anthony and Elisabeth Irwin, Jeannette Augustus Marks and Mary Emma Woolley, Lena Madesin Phillips and Marjory Lacey-Barker, Alice Morgan Wright and Edith J. Goode, Mabel Vernon and Consuelo Reyes-Calderon, and Grace Hutchins and Anna Rochester. Even if it is recorded that all these couples knew each other and collaborated at one time or another, they built a community of "woman-committed women" that rejected the definition of lesbianism.

== Works ==
Lutz's works include:

- Emma Willard, Daughter of Democracy (1929) – about American women's rights activist Emma Willard
- Mary Baker Eddy Historical House brochure (1935) – about Mary Baker Eddy, the founder of the Christian Science religious movement
- Created Equal: A Biography of Elizabeth Cady Stanton, 1815–1902 (1940) – about Elizabeth Cady Stanton, leading figure of the early women's rights movement
- Challenging Years: The memoirs of Harriot Stanton Blatch (1940) – in collaboration with Harriot Stanton Blatch, American writer and suffragist
- With Love Jane, Letters from American Women on the War Fronts (1945), edited by Lutz
- Susan B. Anthony: Rebel, Crusader, Humanitarian (1959) – about American social reformer and women's rights activist Susan B. Anthony
- Crusade for Freedom: Women in the Antislavery Movement (1968)
