= Consuelo Reyes-Calderón =

Consuelo Reyes-Calderón, also known as Consuelo Reyes, (September 14, 1904 – circa 1986) was born in Costa Rica and became a naturalized American. She was an author and activist, working for the Peoples Mandate Committee for Inter-American Peace and Cooperation and National Woman's Party. She created audio-visual materials, such as film strips and slide presentations with audio. She wrote about Costa Rican and Guatemalan people and culture.

== Early life ==
Born Consuelo De Jesus Calderón Reyes in San Jose, Costa Rica on September 14, 1904, her mother was Maria Calderón.

== Career ==
=== Costa Rica ===
From 1926 to 1941, Consuelo Reyes-Calderón worked for the Secretariat of the Apostolado de la Oración (Administrative Office of the Apostleship of Prayer). In 1941, she was a librarian at the Biblioteca Apostolica de la Oracion (Apostolic Library of Prayer). Also in 1941, Reyes-Calderón visited Guatemala at the invitation of Aida Doninelli to study at the Conservatorio Nacional de Música.

=== Activism ===
Reyes-Calderón came to the United States in 1942 and within two weeks she met Mabel Vernon, who worked at the Inter-American Commission of Women and established the People's Mandate Committee. Reyes-Calderón began to work at the Committee the following year, where she was the Secretary for Latin America by 1946. She also worked for the Inter-American Commission of Women, often meeting with Eleanor Roosevelt in the White House with other members of the commission. In 1945, she was at the United Nations.

She studied at Catholic University of America in the social service field. She was also involved in promoting activities aimed to Catholic women.

=== Audio-visual production ===
Reyes-Calderón prepared audio-visual materials for the National Woman's Party and the British and American women's suffrage movements. The completed projects are A Meeting at the Cemetery, Roots of Suffrage, Alice Morgan Wright, Sculptor, Suffragist, a tribute to Mabel Vernon, Our Friend Alma Lutz, and information about other leaders of the movement. These include slideshows with scripts and slides, which were narrated by Fern Ingersoll and Mabel Vernon and recorded on audio tapes with music.

She created film strips about a wide range of topics, about a number of countries. The topics include economics, music, the arts, and culture. She worked on a documentary regarding the women's liberation movement in 1970.

=== Writer ===
She was one of the writers for the 1948 radio program, Know Your Neighbor. The other writers were Amelia Himes Walker and Vernon.

She wrote Letras y Encajes; Revista Femenina al Servicio de la Cultura (Letters and Lace; Feminine Magazine at the Service of Culture) in 1954. In 1980, Reyes-Calderón wrote Aída Doninelli : prima donna siempre, artista de Guatemala (Aida Doninelli : prima donna always, artist from Guatemala).

Nine years later, she wrote Carolina de Jesús Dent Alvarado, un alma amiga de Dios (Carolina de Jesús Dent Alvarado, a friend of God's soul) about the Costa Rican woman Carolina de Jesús Dent Alvarado, who opened the Librería del Sagrado Corazón (Sacred Heart Library), together with Don Eladio Prado S.

She contributed to Speaker for Suffrage and Petitioner for Peace, a memoir by Vernon. Other contributors were Hazel Hunkins-Hallinan, Fern S. Ingersoll, and Rebecca Hourwich Reyher.

== Personal life ==
Reyes-Calderón was also a music lover and took singing lessons. She was a long-life friend of Madame Aída Doninelli (1898-1996), a soprano from Guatemala.

Reyes-Calderón and Vernon shared a Washington apartment from 1951 until Vernon's death in 1975. They used to spend time in the summer at Highmeadow, biographer Alma Lutz and Marguerite Smith's country home in Berlin, New York, who were good friends from the National Woman's Party.

She became a United States citizen by 1970.

When Vernon died in 1975, Reyes-Calderón was noted for her devotion to her companion. According to archive records, she corresponded with Rebecca Hourwich Reyher into 1986. Records about her contributions are among the Peoples Mandate Committee Records, 1935-1975 archives in the Swarthmore College Peace Collection. Several documents are also held at Georgetown University and in the Amelia Roberts Fry Collection of the Alice Paul Institute in Mount Laurel, New Jersey.
