= Whose Broad Stripes and Bright Stars =

Whose Broad Stripes and Bright Stars and similar phrases could refer to:

- "...Whose Broad Stripes and Bright Stars... ", a phrase from the national anthem of the United States, "The Star-Spangled Banner"
- Broad Stripes and Bright Stars, a 1919 children's book by Carolyn Sherwin Bailey
- Whose Broad Stripes and Bright Stars? The Trivial Pursuit of the Presidency 1988, a 1989 book by Jack Germond and Jules Witcover
