= My Mother Is the Most Beautiful Woman in the World =

1945 Picture book

- First edition
- Author: Becky Reyher
- Illustrator: Ruth Chrisman Gannett
- Publisher: Lothrop/William Morrow
- Publication date: 1945
- Pages: unpaged
- Awards: Caldecott Honor

My Mother is the Most Beautiful Woman in the World is a 1945 picture book by Becky Reyher and illustrated by Ruth Chrisman Gannett. A lost girl looks for her mother who is, in the girl's eyes, the most beautiful woman in the world. The book was a recipient of a 1946 Caldecott Honor for its illustrations.
