= Miss Hickory =

1946 novel by Carolyn Sherwin Bailey

- First edition
- Author: Carolyn Sherwin Bailey
- Illustrator: Ruth Chrisman Gannett
- Language: English
- Genre: Children's novel
- Publisher: Viking Press
- Publication date: 1946
- Publication place: United States
- Media type: Print (Hardback & Paperback)
- Pages: 124 pp

Miss Hickory is a 1946 novel by Carolyn Sherwin Bailey that won the Newbery Medal for excellence in American children's literature in 1947.

== Plot introduction ==
The protagonist is Miss Hickory, a doll made from a forked twig from an apple tree and a hickory nut for her head (hence her name). She lives in a tiny doll house made of corncobs outside the home of her human owners. Her world is shaken when the family decides to spend the winter in Boston, Massachusetts, but leave her behind. Miss Hickory is aided during the long cold winter by several farm and forest animals. Prickly and a little stubborn, she slowly learns to accept help from others, and to offer some assistance herself.

Awards
Preceded by Strawberry Girl	Newbery Medal recipient 1947	Succeeded by The Twenty-One Balloons
