= Helena Hill Weed =

American suffragette and geologist

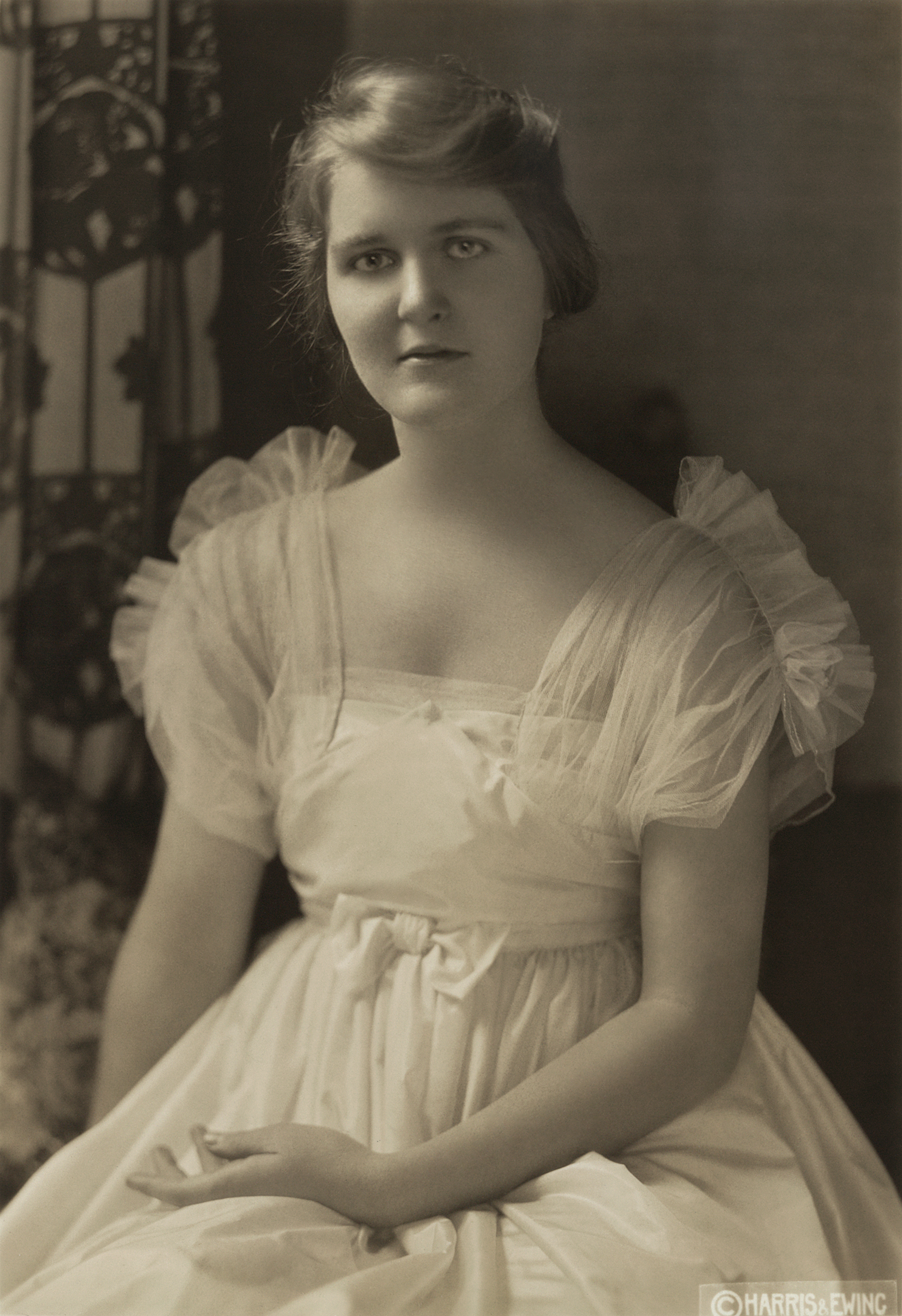
- Portrait by Harris & Ewing, c. 1910–1920
- Born: Helena Charlotte Hill; August 15, 1875
- Died: April 20, 1958 (aged 82)
- Education: Vassar College; Montana School of Mines
- Known for: Women's suffrage
- Father: Ebenezer J. Hill
- Relatives: Elsie Hill (sister)

Helena Charlotte Hill Weed (née Hill; August 15, 1875 – April 20, 1958) was an American suffragist, and a member of the National Woman's Party. She was one of the first American female geologists.

== Biography ==
Helena Charlotte Hill was born on August 15, 1875, to Connecticut congressman Ebenezer J. Hill and Mary Eileen Mossman.

She later married and changed her name to Helena Charlotte Hill Weed.

On July 4, 1917, the anniversary of the United States' independence, Hill picketed outside the White House carrying a banner stating: "Governments derive their just powers from the consent of the governed." this led to her arrest and she served three days in a Washington, D.C. prison. This event is notable as she was one of the first women to be arrested for doing such.

She was arrested again in January 1918 for applauding in court, for which she served a day in jail. In August of that year, she was arrested for participating in the pro-suffrage Lafayette Square meeting at which her sister Elsie Hill spoke, for which Helena served 15 days. Her other sister Clara Hill was also a suffragist.

In addition to her work for women's suffrage, Helena Hill was also one of America's first female geologists, having studied at Vassar College and the Montana School of Mines. She was a founding member of the Women's National Press Club, a vice-president of the Daughters of the American Revolution, and the national secretary of the Haiti-Santo Domingo Independence Society. She also wrote articles in support of Haitian independence for the magazine The Nation.

On April 20, 1958, Hill died at the age of 82.

== See also ==
- List of suffragists and suffragettes
- Timeline of women's suffrage
- Elsie Hill
