= Mary Shotwell Ingraham =

American non-profit executive

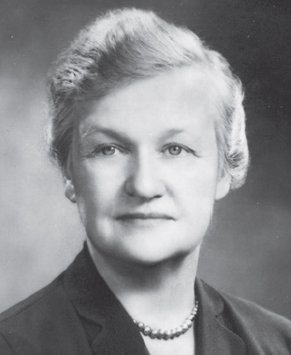
- Born: January 5, 1887; Brooklyn, New York City, U.S.
- Died: April 16, 1981 (aged 94); Long Island, New York, U.S.
- Education: Vassar College

Mary Shotwell Ingraham (January 5, 1887 – April 16, 1981) was an American non-profit executive. In addition to her work with the YWCA and City University of New York (CUNY), she was the founder of the United Service Organizations (USO) and the first woman to receive the Medal for Merit.

== Personal life ==
She was born on January 5, 1887, in Brooklyn, New York, to Henry Titus Shotwell and Alice Wyman née Gardner Shotwell.

In 1908 she graduated from Vassar College. That same year she married Henry Andrews Ingraham (1878–1962), a lawyer. They had four children, including Mary Bunting (1910–1998).

== Career ==
As a member of the New York City Board of Higher Education, Ingraham directed the establishment of the City University of New York. She was also a founder of the United Service Organizations, serving as the organizations' vice president. From 1940 to 1946 she was national president of the American YWCA.

In 1946 she was selected by United States President Harry S. Truman to receive the Medal for Merit, becoming the first woman so honored. In addition to her Medal for Merit, Ingraham was recognized with honorary degrees from Wesleyan University (1958) and Columbia University (1961).

== Death ==
Ingraham died in 1981 in Huntington, New York.
