= Elsie Hill =

American suffragist (1883–1970)

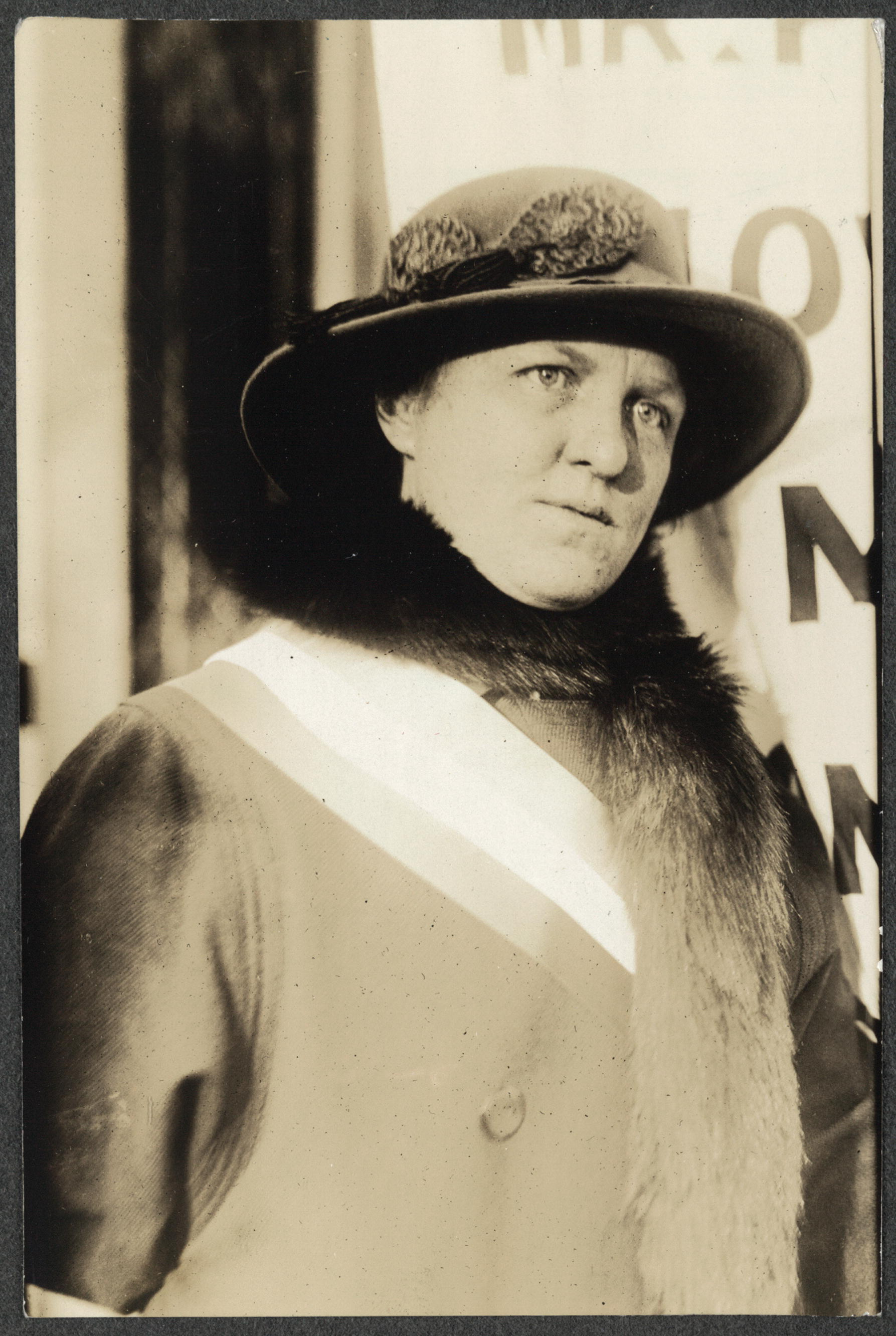
- Elsie M. Hill at a Congressional Union picket at the gate of the White House.
- Born: Elsie Mary Hill; September 23, 1883; Norwalk, Connecticut, US
- Died: August 6, 1970 (aged 86); Norwalk, Connecticut, US
- Occupation: Community organizer
- Known for: Suffragist
- Spouse(s): Albert Levitt (m. 1921), div.

Elsie Hill (September 23, 1883 – August 6, 1970) was an American suffragist, as were her sisters Clara and Helena Hill.

== Biography ==
She was the daughter of Congressman Ebenezer J. Hill and Mary Eileen Mossman. Hill graduated from Vassar College in 1906 and taught high school French in Washington, D.C. She became involved with the D.C. Branch of the College Equal Suffrage League in 1913 along with Alice Paul and Lucy Burns and joined the organization's leadership committee in 1914.

Hill worked on women's rights issues for the rest of her life. She was a strong supporter of the Nineteenth Amendment to the United States Constitution, which gave women the right to vote across the U.S. in 1920. After it passed, she supported the Equal Rights Amendment, which was submitted to Congress in 1921 but has still not been ratified into law.

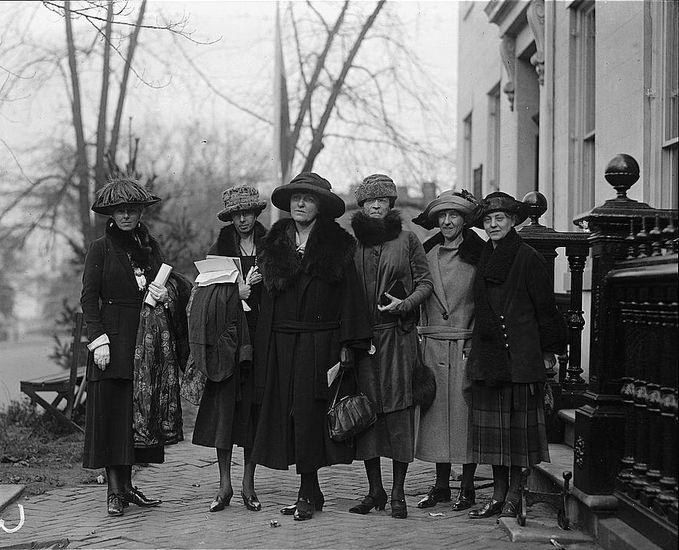
Prominent women at equal rights conference at Woman's Party. L to R: Mrs. Agnes Morey, Brookline, Massachusetts; Miss Katherine Morey, Brookline, Massachusetts & State Chairman of the Woman's Party; Elsie Hill, Norwalk, Conn.; Mary Dean Powell, D.C.; Emma Wold, Portland, Oregon; Mabel Vernon, Wilmington, Del., 1922

Elsie Hill was involved in the planning of the Woman Suffrage Parade of 1913, and notably reached out to African American students during the planning of that event. In 1914–1915 she joined the Congressional Union of Woman Suffrage's executive committee, and headed efforts to establish branches of the Union in South Carolina and Virginia. In July 1916 she spoke at a street meeting in St. Paul, Minnesota, during the Prohibition Party's national convention (while representing the Congressional Union for Woman Suffrage) and the convention did endorse a plank advocating a suffrage amendment. Alice Paul sent Hill on public tours to campaign in favor of women's suffrage in 1916.

She was arrested for speaking at a Lafayette Square meeting in Washington, D.C. in August 1918, and was arrested in Boston in February 1919 for picketing President Woodrow Wilson upon his return from Europe.

In 1921 she married Albert Levitt but kept her own name, as was noted in the New York Times. Also that year she chaired the National Woman's Party's convention, and she was the Party's National Council chairwoman from 1921 until 1925. (The National Woman's Party was simply the Congressional Union of Woman Suffrage with a new name.) In 1924, Hill and other members of the Party visited President Calvin Coolidge to lobby on behalf of the Equal Rights Amendment.

In 1956 she and Levitt divorced.

In 1968 Hill was a passenger on Pan American Airlines' first flight from New York to Moscow.

The Elsie M. Hill Papers are held at the Archives and Special Collections Library in the Vassar College Libraries.

== See also ==
- List of suffragists and suffragettes
- Timeline of women's suffrage
