= Emma Wold =

American suffragist

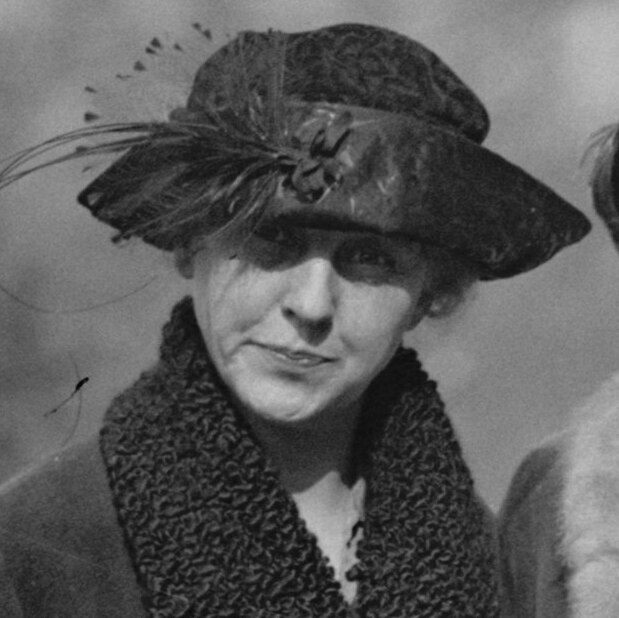
- Emma Wold as a Woman's Party conference delegate, 1922
- Born: 1871
- Died: July 21, 1950 (aged 78–79); Washington, DC, USA
- Education: University of Oregon; Washington Law School
- Occupations: Lawyer, teacher

Emma Wold (1871 - July 21, 1950) was an American suffragist. She was president of the College Equal Suffrage Association in Oregon, and later served as the headquarters secretary of the National Woman's Party.

== Biography ==
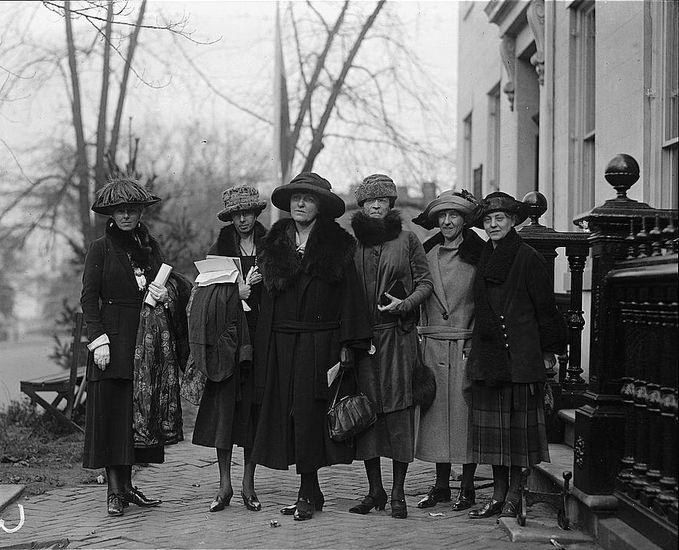
Prominent women at Woman's Party equal rights conference (1922). L to R: Agnes Morey, Brookline, MA; Katherine Morey, Brookline, MA & State Chairman of the Woman's Party; Elsie Hill, Norwalk, CT; Mary Dean Powell, DC; Emma Wold, Portland, OR; Mabel Vernon, Wilmington, DE

Wold graduated from the University of Oregon and Washington Law School.

Wold helped to organize a National Woman's Party convention in 1921 where one of the primary discussions was making arrangements for Black feminist representatives to discuss the specific problems Black women faced trying to vote, particularly in the Southern states of the United States. It was a controversial convention to participate in because it risked alienating the National Woman's Party from other women's suffragist parties in the South that were against the Black vote.

In 1918 she ran for the Oregon House of Representatives, but lost.

She wrote the foreword to a 1928 collection of nationality laws as impacted by marriage for the House of Representatives Committee on Immigration and Naturalization. She explained several former laws that stripped American women of their citizenship if they married a foreign man in this foreword.

In 1930 she was appointed by President Herbert Hoover to be a delegate at the Conference for Codification of International Law at the Hague, to represent women's interests in international law. She also worked as a lawyer and a teacher, and a Sunday school clerk and superintendent. Wold died on July 21, 1950.
