= Elbridge W. Locke =

American composer and singer

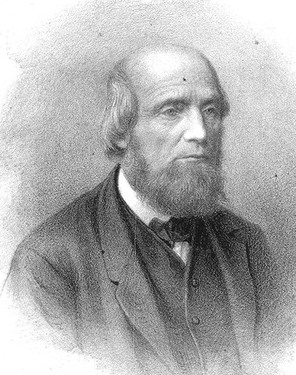
E. W. Locke in 1873

Elbridge W. Locke (1818–1900) was a well-known and popular American writer of short poems and songs, a composer of music, and a public singer of the 19th century.

He was born Elbridge Warren Locke in Stoddard, New Hampshire, on January 1, 1818. While a youth he apprenticed as a mechanic while studying in the evenings. His study positioned him to become a teacher and he took up that profession. Before long, he introduced the students to singing. Despite it being limited to the noon hour, it is reported that parents objected to such activity on the basis that it was a distraction from more scholarly pursuits.

Widely known as "Father Locke" he was most active in this career from the late 1840s until late in the century. He composed a large number of songs, and in that era of only live performances often traveled the country singing these to appreciative audiences.

Father Locke's efforts under Abraham Lincoln to boost morale among Union troops during the Civil War presaged comparable efforts in World War I, where Pipe & Brass bands as well as visits by touring choirs and concerts took place, eventually becoming more formalized during World War II with the founding of the USO.

He was an early and active supporter of Lincoln for president. In 1860 at a Republican Party gathering to ratify the nomination of Lincoln in Boston's Faneuil Hall, he first sang his own song, "Our Lincoln Is the Man", for a large audience. He subsequently was urged to travel to Springfield, Illinois to sing the song at a big meeting being held there, which he did to a crowd estimated at 50,000. In a reminiscence, Locke said that the next morning a young lad came and said that Lincoln requested that he come to his house and sing the song to him. He readily agreed and paid the visit, gaining the future president's admiration and friendship.

In 1862, Locke visited the Lincoln at the White House, on which occasion he asked Locke if he would be willing to visit the soldiers in their various camps to cheer them up and provide a bit of familiar entertainment. This he did with enthusiasm, delivering his stirring songs and recounting amusing tales to thousands of troops. He also devoted time to visiting and working in the field hospitals. Since writing home was the only means for the troops to communicate with loved ones, and there were no post offices in the field, he also brought along postage stamps he provided the troops at cost. He was probably more well known to Union soldiers in the Civil War than any other civilian in the country.

In 1866, the Portland Press Herald took note of Locke's "remarkable success" in a front-page story noting that the ballad writer and singer had become "known in almost every community in the North". Details made it evident that his talent was in words and music that simply captured the mood of a war torn nation in that difficult time.

After the war, he narrated some of his experiences, a few of which have been described as “thrilling”, in his book entitled "Three Years in Camp and Hospital", which went through eight editions.

Under the name E. W. Locke, he wrote and composed a great many songs. His five most popular camp songs were "We're Marching Down to Dixie's Land", "We're Working on to Richmond", "We Must Not Fall Back Any More”, "Ulysses Leads the Van", and "Peter Butternut's Lament". But the song of his that gained the greatest circulation was his temperance song, "Has Father Been Here?". He is said to have sold well over half a million copies of his sheet music.

In his later years, he traveled widely, lecturing on the need for prison reform. He also addressed the issue of strikes against employers, composing what he called a “Father Locke’s Sermon on Strikes”. Late in life he set up a local charity in his home town of Chelsea, Massachusetts . Called "Father Locke's Flannel Fund", it provided cotton flannel to the needy women and children of Chelsea. In addition, in his will he established another fund, the "Father Locke Hospital Fund", to provide hospital care for the poor of the town.

== Selected bibliography ==
- Dodge's Songs. The Mackerel Catchers.
- I Feel I'm Growing Old Lizzie (Ballad)
- Strike for the Right
- The Ship of State
- Hark! To arms! Our Country calls us!
- McClellan Is Our Man
- We are Marching Down to Dixie's Land
- We Will Not Retreat Anymore (with G. Ascher)
- We're Working on to Richmond
- We Must Not Fall Back Any More
- Ulysses Leads the Van
- Swinging Around the Circle
- And So Will the Boys in Blue
- Like a Sunbeam Came Our Darling
- Peter Butternut's Lament
- Father is Coming To-Night
- Heaven Our Home
- Summer Land
- Journeying On
- There's a Fresh Little Mound near the Willow
- Be Kind to the Suffering Poor
- Down by the Sea
- Sweet Child of the Glen
- Sweet Kitty Manee
- Oh! Dear Me I Wish I Were Married
- Has Father Been Here?
- Our Free America
