= Mabel Vernon =

American suffragist (1883–1975)

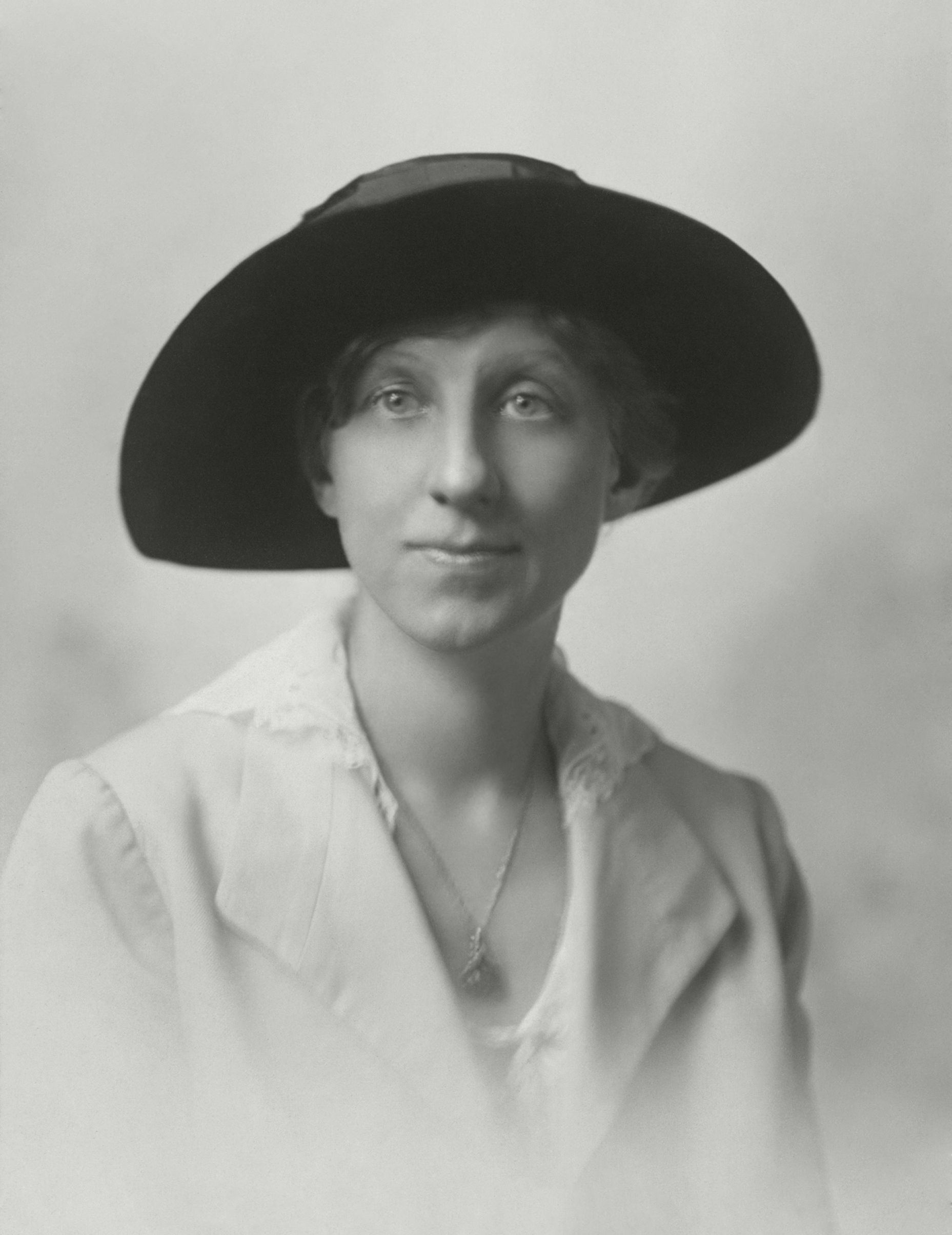
- Vernon c. 1917
- Born: September 19, 1883; Wilmington, Delaware, U.S.
- Died: September 2, 1975 (aged 91); Washington, D.C., U.S.
- Education: Swarthmore College; Columbia University
- Occupations: Suffragist and pacifist

Mabel Vernon (September 19, 1883 – September 2, 1975) was an American suffragist, pacifist, and a national leader in the United States suffrage movement. She was a Quaker and a member of the National American Woman Suffrage Association. Vernon was inspired by the methods used by the Women's Social and Political Union in Britain. Vernon was one of the principal members of the Congressional Union for Women Suffrage (CUWS) alongside Olympia Brown, Inez Milholland, Crystal Eastman, Lucy Burns, and Alice Paul, and helped to organize the Silent Sentinels protests that involved daily picketing of Woodrow Wilson's White House.

== Early life and education ==
Mabel Vernon was born on September 19, 1883, in Wilmington, Delaware, to George Washington Vernon (1820-1901) an editor and publisher of the Wilmington Daily Republican, and Mary Vernon, née Hooton (1843-1933). She graduated from Wilmington Friends School in 1901. She went on to attend Swarthmore College where she was a year ahead of Alice Paul. Vernon graduated from Swarthmore in 1906. She then became a teacher at Radnor High School in Wayne, Pennsylvania, where she taught Latin and German.

== Organizing for women's suffrage ==
Vernon attended the 1912 convention of the National American Woman Suffrage Association, where she was an usher. She was the first paid organizer that Alice Paul recruited. Vernon joined Lucy Burns and Paul as part of NAWSA's Congressional Committee to organize the Woman Suffrage Parade of 1913 that was to occur the following March where it would coincide with the inauguration of Woodrow Wilson. During the Summer of 1913, Vernon and Edith Marsden campaigned for suffrage in Rhode Island, New Jersey, and Long Island.

In 1914, Vernon organized for the Congressional Union, travelling through the Southwestern United States and making her way north through California before arriving in Nevada. An accomplished fundraiser, she assisted Anne Martin in Nevada, who was working for NAWSA on a referendum campaign. After Martin got into a debate with Senator Key Pittman, Anna Howard Shaw wrote her an angry letter accusing her of being duped by Vernon and the CU. Late in 1915, Sara Bard Field drove a petition with 500,000 signatures supporting the 19th Amendment across the United States to be presented to President Woodrow Wilson in Washington, D.C. Along the route, Vernon acted as an organizing advance woman, preparing dignitaries, press, and women groups in over 100 communities to welcome the tour and sign the petition. According to the Women's Heritage Museum's Newsletter, "The petition demonstrated the spirit, will, and ability of Western women voters to elect or defeat members of a political party," One of the first stops of the petition tour was Salt Lake City where Vernon, with the help of Elsie Lancaster, another NWP member, laid the groundwork for Alice Paul to organize a Congressional Union branch in Utah.

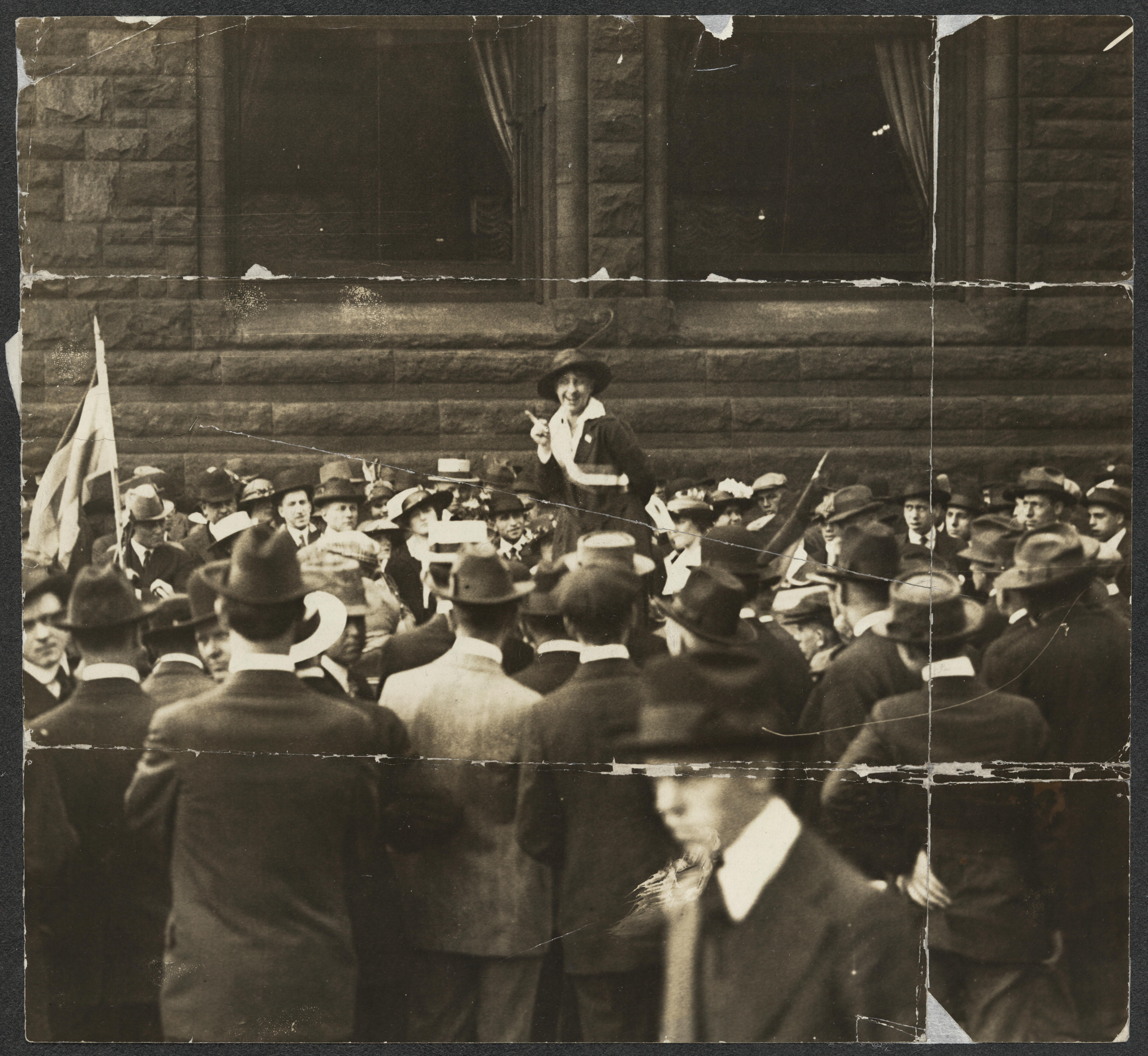
Mabel Vernon addressing an all-male crowd in Washington, D.C. in 1916.

At a June 1916 convention in Chicago, women from states that had granted them the right to vote gathered to form the National Woman's Party. The Democratic Party had adopted a suffrage plank that advocated state's rights to choose suffrage, but continued to block national suffrage. Frustrated with the situation, Vernon interrupted President Woodrow Wilson during a speech he was giving at the dedication of the Labor Temple in Washington on July 4, querying, "Mr. President, if you sincerely desire to forward the interests of all the people, why do you oppose the national enfranchisement of women?" Wilson dismissed the question and when Vernon repeated the question again later, police ordered her to leave the meeting.

Vernon was a key organizer of the campaign of the Silent Sentinels that began on January 10, 1917. She was responsible for ensuring that there were enough volunteers each day to picket the White House. Vernon and Paul organized themed days for the picket where all of the volunteers were from certain states or from certain professions. Their strategy ensured consistent press coverage and the eighteen-month campaign saw thousands of women participate and culminated in the arrests of many picketers and the "Night of Terror".

In March 1917, it was decided to merge the Congressional Union and the National Woman's Party. Following the vote, Vernon was selected to be Secretary of the NWP. After President Woodrow Wilson announced the American entry into World War I, a committee was able to secure an audience with Wilson on the issue of suffrage. Doris Stevens, in her memoir Jailed for Freedom, wrote that the President was moved when Mabel Vernon said "If the right of those who submit to authority to have a voice in their own government is so sacred a cause to foreign people as to constitute the reason for our entering the international war in its defense, will you not, Mr. President, give immediate aid to the measure before Congress demanding self-government for the women of this country?"

At a convention in late 1917, Vernon identified the most significant impacts of the picketing. First of all, they generated consistent publicity and kept the fight for women's suffrage on national headlines. Vernon also noted that the picketing of the Silent Sentinels forced female suffrage into the consciousness of Woodrow Wilson, barring him from ignoring them, writing, "Was it not worth even going to prison for, to have national woman suffrage daily in the mind of the President?" Additionally, the picketing kept the female suffrage question in the minds of Congress during war sessions. The Silent Sentinels also served as a symbol of the growing sentiment and unity of the women's suffrage movement. Through protest, it created a unique and unified militant identity for women fighting for political voice. Their appearances in the public and political spheres direct addresses to the president, and motivating sacrifice infused the Silent Sentinels militant identity and ultimately contributed to the success of the 19th Amendment.

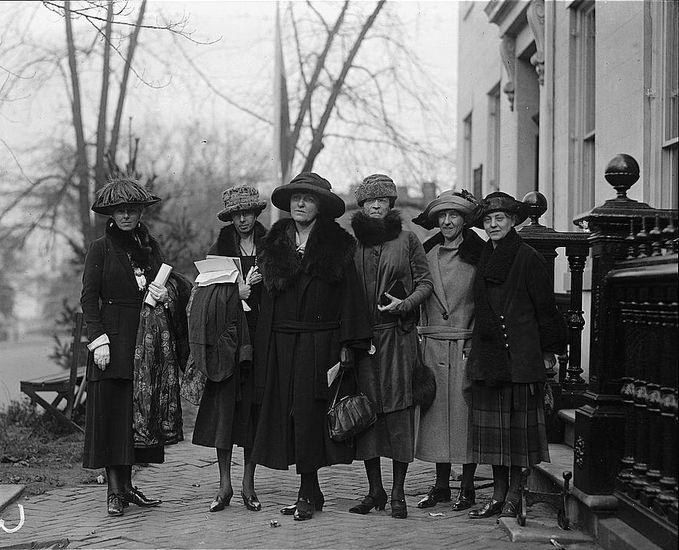
Prominent women at equal rights conference at Woman's Party. L to R: Mrs. Agnes Morey, Brookline, Mass.; Miss Katherine Morey, Brookline, Mass. & State Chairman of the Woman's Party; Elsie Hill, Norwalk, Conn.; Mary Dean Powell, D.C.; Emma Wold, Portland, Oregon; Mabel Vernon, Wilmington, Del., 192

Vernon was among the first six women who were arrested while picketing the White House, under charges of "obstructing the traffic." They were tried and found guilty on June 26, 1917, and each was ordered to pay a US$25 fine or spend three days in jail. All of the women insisted they were innocent and refused to pay the fine. Following the passage of the Nineteenth Amendment, during the 1920s, Vernon supported women candidates for Congress and lobbied on behalf of the Equal Rights Amendment.

Vernon went to Columbia University where she earned a master's degree in political science in 1924.

== Later life ==
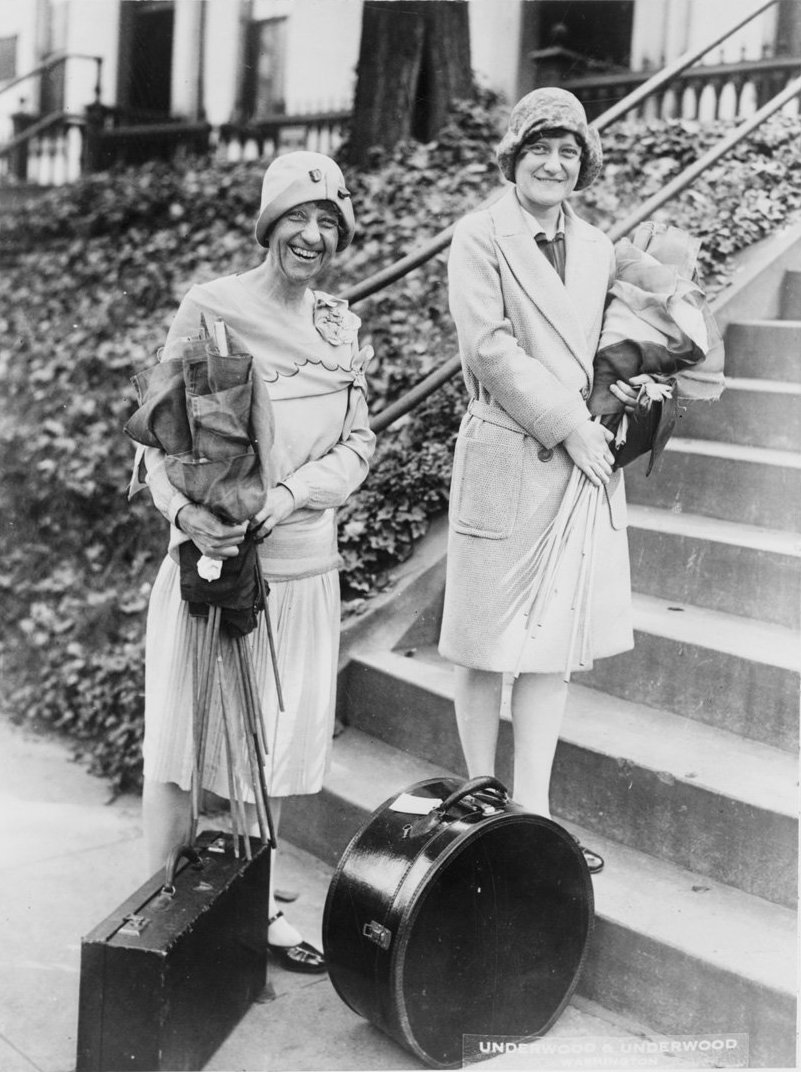
Underwood & Underwood Studios, New York City/LOC cph.3c11667. Miss Mabel Vernon, National Executive Secretary of the National Woman's party, and Miss Mary Moss Wellborn, 1928

In 1930, Vernon turned her attention from the women's movement to focus on international relations and peace. She was a proponent of Latin American rights and disarmament. Vernon joined the Women's International League for Peace and Freedom in 1930. She was director of the Peoples Mandate Committee for Inter-American Peace and Cooperation in the 1940s. She was a member of the Inter-American delegation to the foundation of the United Nations.

Beginning in 1951, Vernon lived with her companion Consuelo Reyes-Calderón in Washington, D.C. Reyes-Calderon contributed to Speaker for Suffrage and Petitioner for Peace, a memoir by Vernon. Other contributors were Hazel Hunkins-Hallinan, Fern S. Ingersoll, and Rebecca Hourwich Reyher.

Vernon died on September 2, 1975.

In the 2004 film Iron Jawed Angels she was portrayed by Brooke Smith. However, the film does not depict her being arrested and imprisoned: instead, she is shown managing the NWP during Alice Paul's incarceration, including working with lawyers on appeals for the suffragettes.

== See also ==
- List of suffragists and suffragettes
- List of women's rights activists
- Timeline of women's suffrage
- Women's suffrage organizations
