= Edith J. Goode =

American philanthropist

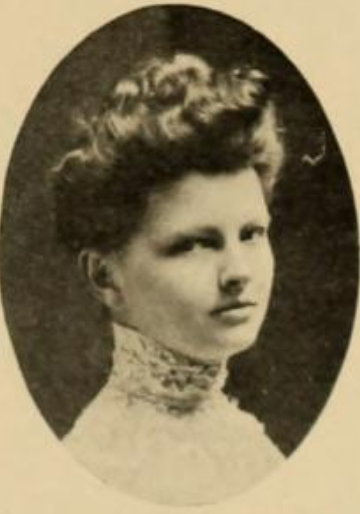
- Edith Jeannette Goode, from the 1904 yearbook of Smith College
- Born: November 13, 1882; Springfield, Ohio, U.S.
- Died: March 14, 1970 (aged 87); Washington, D.C., U.S.
- Occupations: Philanthropist, suffragist
- Known for: Benefactor of the Humane Society of the United States
- Partner: Alice Morgan Wright

Edith Jeannette Goode (November 13, 1882 – March 14, 1970) was an American suffragist, pacifist, and philanthropist. She was especially involved in the founding of the National Woman's Party and the Humane Society of the United States.

== Early life and education ==
Goode was born in Springfield, Ohio, the daughter of lawyer Frank Cowan Goode and Jane (Jennie) McKnight Goode. Her father died in 1887, and Goode was raised by her widowed mother in Washington, D.C. She attended Sidwell Friends School and graduated from Smith College in 1904. She was active in the Smith College Alumnae Council.

== Career ==
Goode and her mother were among the founders of the National Woman's Party in 1913, and she served on the Party's national council in 1945. In 1946 she attended United Nations meetings on the status of women, as a representative of the National Woman's Party. She testified before a Senate hearing in 1948. In 1950 she represented the National Council of Women of the United States as a delegate at a housing conference in Washington.

Goode was vice-president of the Washington Humane Society, and recording secretary of the Consumers' League of the District of Columbia. She served on the board of the Humane Society of the United States from 1958 to 1967, and donated a 140-acre estate to the organization. She was a founding member of the World Federation for the Protection of Animals, and a member of the Women's International League for Peace and Freedom.

== Personal life and legacy ==
Goode lived in Washington, D.C., and had a summer residence in Vermont. In 1929, she and her cousin Elsie Baskin Adams were named among the heirs of their aunt, Alice Goode Cobb. Goode later donated twenty pieces of Spanish colonial furniture to the National Museum of History and Technology, in Adams's name.

Goode had a longtime relationship with her Smith College classmate, artist Alice Morgan Wright; the two women shared interests in feminism, peace, and animal causes. Wright sculpted a portrait bust of Goode, now in the collection of the Albany Institute of History and Art. Goode died in 1970, at the age of 87, at a hospital in Washington, D.C. A trust in her name funds American organizations focused on preventing cruelty to animals.
