= Aída Doninelli =

Opera singer

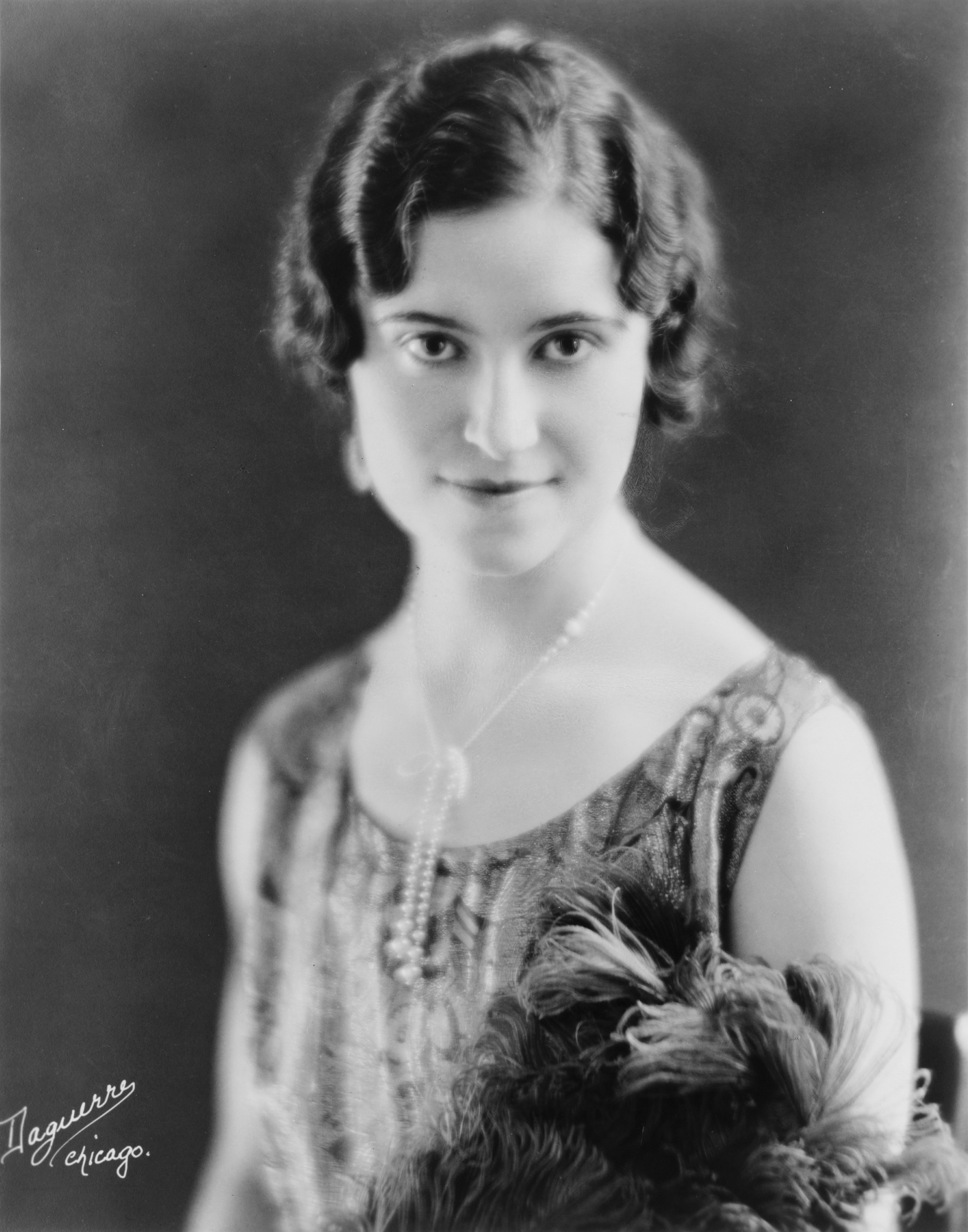
- Born: November 4, 1898; Guatemala City
- Died: 1996 (aged 97–98); Mexico
- Occupation: Opera singer

Aída Doninelli (November 4, 1898 – 1996) was a Guatemalan soprano. She was the first opera singer from Guatemala to perform at the Metropolitan Opera.

== Biography ==
Aída Doninelli was born on November 4, 1898 in Guatemala City, one of six surviving children of a family who emigrated from Italy from 1894 to 1901. Her parents were Antonio Doninelli and Angela Pozzi. Her father reportedly named her Aída because he had just returned from a performance of Verdi's Aida on the evening of her birth.

Doninelli studied under Susana Illescas de Palomo at the Colegio de La Concepción. She debuted as a soloist in a Panama Canal Zone concert for returning World War I soldiers. In 1922, against her father's wishes, she married Mexican cellist José Silvestre Véliz. The pair toured the United States, with Doninelli singing and Véliz as accompanist.

Doninelli made her debut at the Metropolitan Opera in 1928 in her namesake Aida as an unseen priestess, singing offstage. Other roles she performed at the Met included Frasquita in Bizet's Carmen, Musetta in Puccini's La Bohème, Ellen in Delibes' Lakmé, Irma in Gustave Charpentier's Louise, Poussette in Jules Massenet's Manon, Laura in Verdi's Luisa Miller, Mme. Seraskier in Deems Taylor's Peter Ibbetson, Lisa in Vincenzo Bellini's La Sonnambula, Jemmy in Rossini's Guillaume Tell, and minor roles in Wagner's Parsifal and Tannhäuser, Verdi's La Forza del Destino, Ottorino Respighi's La Campana Sommersa, and Ildebrando Pizzetti's Fra Gherardo. Tired of a lack of leading roles, she left for the San Carlo Opera Company.

In 1938, she returned to Guatemala. She taught at the Conservatorio Nacional de Música (Guatemala)] and was the cultural attaché for Guatemala in Mexico.
