= United Service Organizations =

American charitable organization

United Service Organizations, Inc.
- Founded: February 4, 1941; 85 years ago
- Type: Services
- Purpose: To strengthen the well-being of the people serving in America’s military and their families.
- Location: Arlington County, Virginia, U.S.
- Region served: 250+ centers worldwide
- Chairman: David L. Goldfein
- CEO: Courtney Billington (Interim)
- Revenue: Donations (a 501(c)(3) non-profit)
- Employees: 501–1000
- Volunteers: 21,000+
- Website: uso.org

The United Service Organizations, Inc. (USO) is an American nonprofit-charitable corporation that provides live entertainment, such as comedians, actors and musicians, social facilities, and other programs to members of the United States Armed Forces and their families. Since 1941, it has worked in partnership with the Department of War, and later with the Department of Defense (DoD), relying heavily on private contributions and on funds, goods, and services from various corporate and individual donors. Although it is congressionally chartered, it is not a government agency.

Founded during World War II, the USO sought to be the GI's "home away from home" and began a tradition of entertaining the troops and providing social facilities. Involvement in the USO was one of the many ways in which the nation had come together to support the war effort, with nearly 1.5 million people having volunteered their services in some way. The USO initially disbanded in 1947, but was revived in 1950 for the Korean War, after which it continued, also providing peacetime services. During the Vietnam War, USO social facilities ("USOs") were sometimes located in combat zones.

The organization became particularly known for its live performances, called "camp shows", through which the entertainment industry helps boost the morale of servicemen and women. In the early days, Hollywood was eager to show its patriotism, and many celebrities joined the ranks of USO entertainers. They went as volunteers to entertain, and celebrities continue to provide volunteer entertainment in military bases in the U.S. and overseas, sometimes placing their own lives in danger by traveling or performing under hazardous conditions. In 2011, the USO was awarded the National Medal of Arts.

According to the organization's website, the USO maintains over 250 locations worldwide. During a gala marking the USO's 75th anniversary in 2016, retired Army Gen. George W. Casey Jr., then-chairman of the USO Board of Governors, estimated that the USO has served more than 35 million Americans over its history.

== History ==
The USO built on and greatly enriched a tradition of entertaining troops in the war theater. In World War I, many soldiers were treated to a variety of theatrical and musical performances (in which some soldiers participated when professionals were scarce). And in the Civil War, soldiers themselves typically played instruments and sang songs for entertainment. There were a few traveling entertainers who risked their lives to entertain troops in camp. The most well known, indeed famous, of these was Father Locke, whose service was requested by President Abraham Lincoln himself.

=== Mission and goals ===
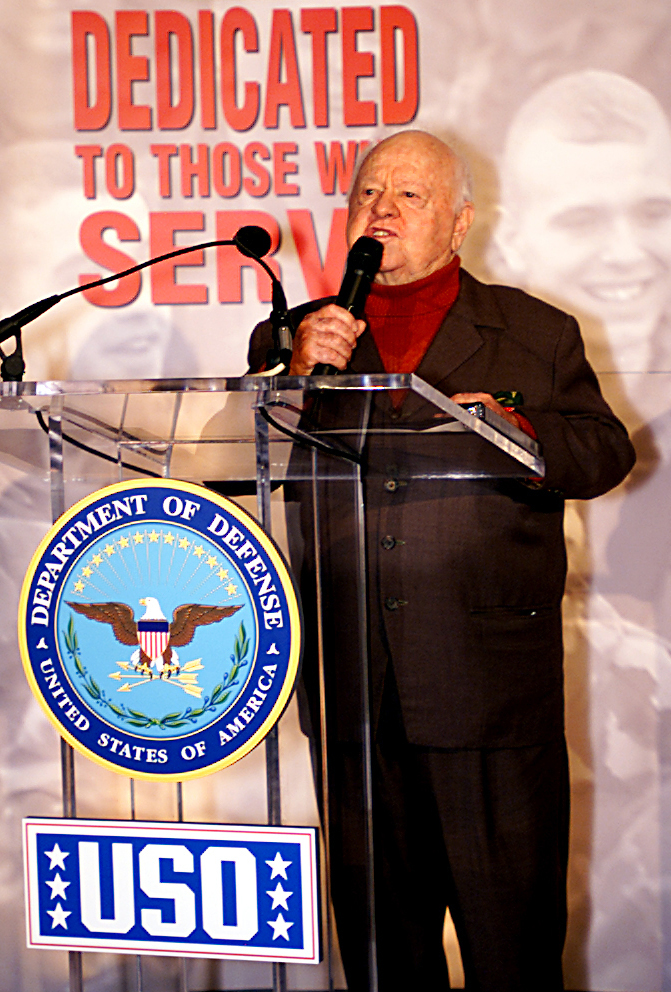
Actor Mickey Rooney, a World War II Bronze Star recipient, honoring the USO in 2000

The USO was founded on February 4, 1941 by Mary Ingraham in response to a request from President Franklin D. Roosevelt to provide morale and recreation services to U.S. uniformed military personnel. Roosevelt was elected as its honorary chairman. This request brought together six civilian organizations: the Salvation Army, YMCA, Young Women's Christian Association (YWCA), National Catholic Community Service, National Travelers Aid Association and the National Jewish Welfare Board. They were brought together under one umbrella to support U.S. troops, as opposed to operating independently as some had done during the First World War. Roosevelt said he wanted "these private organizations to handle the on-leave recreation of the men in the armed forces." According to historian Emily Yellin, "The government was to build the buildings and the USO was to raise private funds to carry out its main mission: boosting the morale of the military."

The first national campaign chairman was Thomas Dewey, who raised $16 million in the first year. The second chairman was future senator Prescott Bush. The USO was incorporated in New York on February 4, with the first facility erected in DeRidder, Louisiana, 1941. More USO centers and clubs opened around the world as a "Home Away from Home" for GIs. The USO club was a place to go for dances and social events, for movies and music, for a quiet place to talk or write a letter home, or for a free cup of coffee and an egg.

The USO also brought Hollywood celebrities and volunteer entertainers to perform for the troops. According to movie historian Steven Cohan, "most of all ... in taking home on the road, it equated the nation with showbiz. USO camp shows were designed in their export to remind soldiers of home." They did this, he noted, by "nurturing in troops a sense of patriotic identification with America through popular entertainment." An article in Look magazine at the time, stated, "For the little time the show lasts, the men are taken straight to the familiar Main Street that is the goal of every fighting American far away from home." Maxene Andrews wrote, "The entertainment brought home to the boys. Their home." Actor George Raft stated at the beginning of the war, "Now it's going to be up to us to send to the men here and abroad real, living entertainment, the songs, the dances, and the laughs they had back home."

USO promotional literature stated its goals:

The story of USO camp shows belongs to the American people, for it was their contribution that made it possible. It is an important part in the life of your sons, your brothers, your husbands, and your sweethearts.

In 2011, the USO was awarded the National Medal of Arts by President Barack Obama "for contributions to lifting the spirits of America's troops and their families through the arts".

=== World War II ===
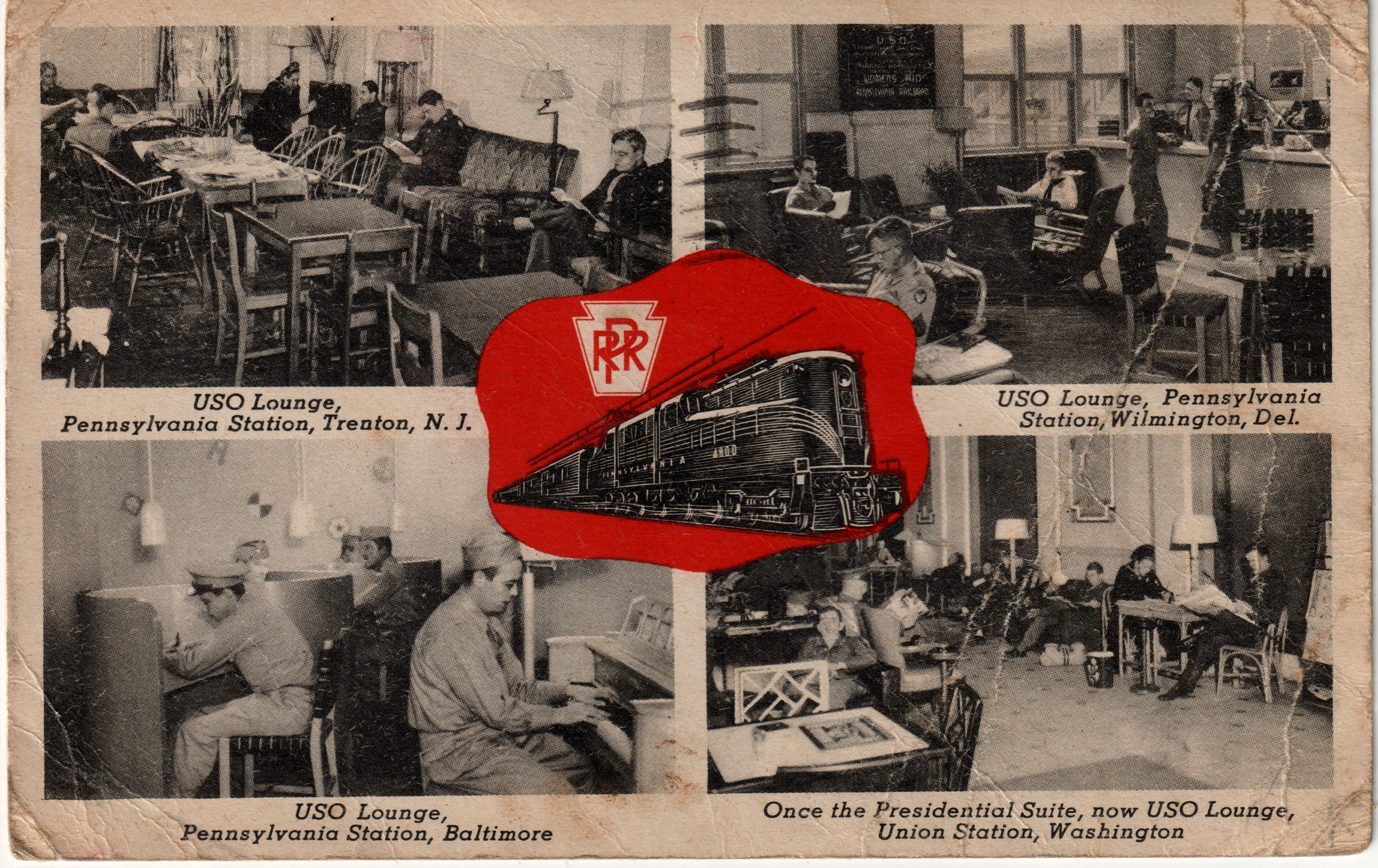
USO lounges in United States railway stations during World War II

After being formed in 1941, in response to World War II, "centers were established quickly ... in churches, barns, railroad cars, museums, castles, beach clubs, and log cabins." Most centers offered recreational activities, such as holding dances and showing movies. And there were the well-known free coffee and doughnuts. Some USO centers provided a haven for spending a quiet moment alone or writing a letter home, while others offered spiritual guidance and made childcare available for military wives.

But the organization became mostly known for its live performances called Camp Shows, through which the entertainment industry helped boost the morale of its servicemen and women. USO Camp Shows, Inc. began in October 1941, and by that fall and winter 186 military theaters existed in the United States. Overseas shows began in November 1941 with a tour of the Caribbean.

From Laurel and Hardy Central:

The Flying Showboat, was the first revue. The troupe of show business professionals toured U.S. military bases in the Caribbean. It included comedians Chico Marx, Laurel and Hardy, singer Jane Pickens, dancer Ray Bolger, and actor John Garfield, who acted as master of ceremonies. These stars performed under some extremely trying conditions, as the weather was brutally hot and many of the camps were not equipped to host theatrical performances. Chico, whose "shoot the keys" piano solos were the heart of his act, often had to do without a piano at all. Thankfully, Laurel and Hardy's Driver's License sketch needed only a few simple props. In any event, even the most ramshackle shows brought loud cheers from the troops, overjoyed that anybody had come to perform for them, let alone some of the finest talents Hollywood had to offer.

Within five months 36 overseas units had been sent within the Americas, the United Kingdom, and Australia, and during 1942 1,000 performed as part of 70 units. Average performers were paid $100 a week; top stars were paid $10 a day because their wealth let them contribute more of their talents.

These overseas shows were produced by the American Theatre Wing, which also provided food and entertainment for the armed services in their Stage Door Canteens. Funds from the sale of film rights for a story about the New York Canteen went toward providing USO tours of shows for overseas troops.

Following the Invasion of Normandy on June 6, 1944, Edward G. Robinson was the first movie star to travel to Normandy to entertain the troops. He had already been active back home selling war bonds, and donated $100,000 to the USO. During his show, he said, "This is the most privileged moment of my life, the opportunity to be here with you." The following month, Camp Shows began in Normandy.

Until fall 1944 overseas units contained five performers or fewer; The Barretts of Wimpole Street, using local theaters in France and Italy, was the first to use an entire theater company, including scenery. At its high point in 1944, the USO had more than 3,000 clubs, and curtains were rising on USO shows 700 times a day. The USO's fundraising efforts were controversial. An MGM film, Mr. Gardenia Jones, created to assist the USO in its fundraising campaign, was nearly withdrawn from theaters due to objections by the War Department, mainly because of scenes showing soldiers jumping with joy at the opportunity to shower in canteens and rest in overstuffed and comfortable USO chairs. The Army, noted The New York Times, "feels this is not good for morale as it implies that there are no showers or other comforts for soldiers in military camps." The film starred Ronald Reagan, then a captain in the Army Air Force.

Fundraising was also aided by non-USO entertainment groups. Soldier Shows, which troops – often experienced actors and musicians – organized and held their own performances, were common. The army formed a Special Services unit that organized such shows and supervised the USO, and the experience from the Soldier Shows led to Irving Berlin's Broadway show This Is the Army. Performers and writers from throughout the army were recruited for the production; they remained soldiers and continued drills. Berlin, who had written and produced the similar Yip, Yip, Yaphank during World War I, took the entire 165-person cast on tour in Europe in 1942, raising nearly $10 million for the Army Emergency Relief Fund. The following year the show was made into a film by the same title, again starring Ronald Reagan. The This Is The Army stage production toured worldwide until it closed in October 1945 in Honolulu. The USO was also supported by the National War Fund.

War correspondent Quentin Reynolds, wrote in an article for Billboard magazine in 1943, that "Entertainment, all phases of it – radio, pictures and live – should be treated as essential. You don't know what entertainment means to the guys who do the fighting until you've been up there with the men yourself. ... You can quote me as saying that we should use entertainment as an essential industry so long as it's for the boys in service. Anybody who has been there would insist on it. ... Hell, you should have seen how happy the G.I.s were when they heard the ballplayers were coming over. And John Steinbeck, just back from a chore as war correspondent, ... also applauded show business as part of the war effort and its importance as a morale builder."

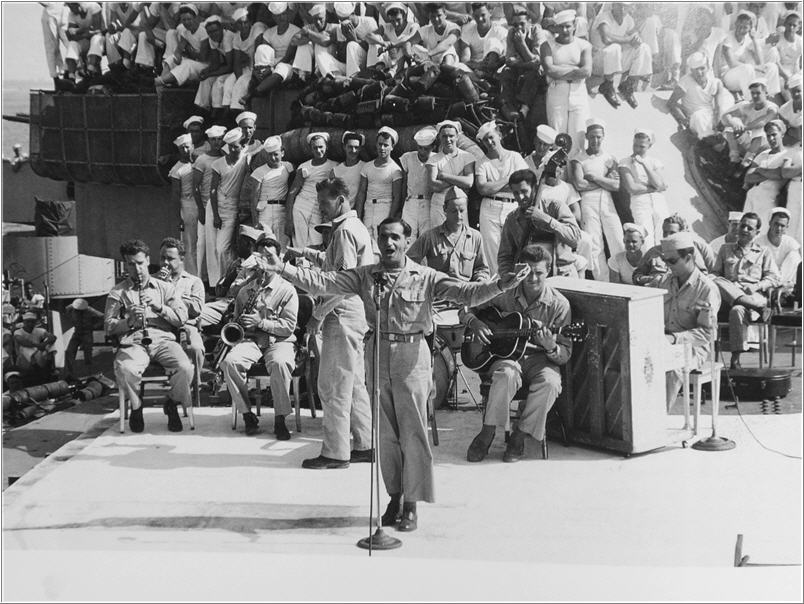
Irving Berlin singing aboard USS Arkansas, 1944

According to historian Paul Holsinger, between 1941 and 1945, the USO did 293,738 performances in 208,178 separate visits. Estimates were that more than 161 million servicemen and women, in the U.S. and abroad, were entertained. The USO also did shows in military hospitals, eventually entertaining more than 3 million wounded soldiers and sailors in 192 different hospitals. There were 702 different USO troupes that toured the world, some spending up to six months per tour. In 1943, a United States Liberty ship named the SS U.S.O. was launched. She was scrapped in 1967.

Twenty-eight performers died in the course of their tours, from plane crashes, illness, or diseases contracted while on tour. In one such instance in 1943, a plane carrying a USO troupe crashed outside Lisbon, killing singer and actress Tamara Drasin, and severely injuring Broadway singer Jane Froman. Froman returned to Europe on crutches in 1945 to again entertain the troops. She later married the co-pilot who saved her life in that crash, and her story was made into the 1952 film With a Song in My Heart, with Froman providing the actual singing voice. Others, such as Al Jolson, the first entertainer to go overseas in World War II, contracted malaria, resulting in the loss of his lung, cutting short his tour.

One author wrote that by the end of the war "the USO amounted to the biggest enterprise American show business has ever tackled. The audience was millions of American fighting men, the theatre's location: the world, the producer: USO camp shows" Sixty-six USO units were in the European Theater of Operations on Victory in Europe Day 1945 with a monthly audience of 750,000 soldiers. Performances continued after the end of the war; 60 new units went to Europe after V-E Day, and 91 new units went to the Pacific after V-J Day. The USO dissolved in December 1947, after having spent $240 million in contributions on Camp Shows, canteens, and other services. Special Services productions grew in number as replacement.

In 1991, 20th Century Fox produced the film For the Boys, which told the story of two USO performers, and starred Bette Midler and James Caan. It covered a 50-year timespan, from the USO's inception in 1941 through Operation Desert Storm, in 1991. Another movie was planned in 1950 but never made. Just 10 days after Al Jolson returned from entertaining troops in Korea, he agreed with RKO producers to star in a new movie, Stars and Stripes for Ever, about a USO troupe in the South Pacific during World War II. He died a week later as a result of physical exhaustion from his tour.

==== Segregation and women in the USO ====
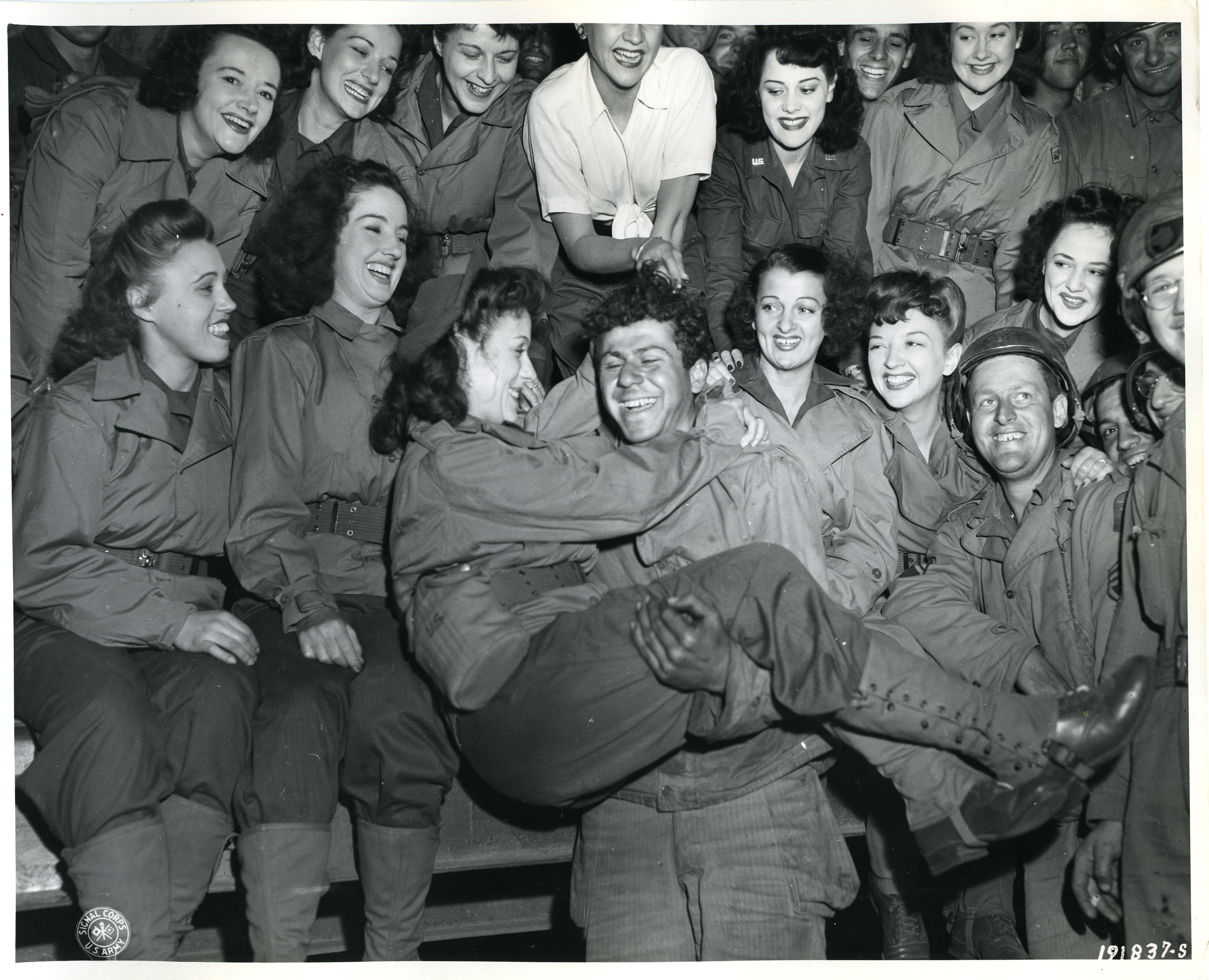
Female USO troupe entertaining an American soldier, 1944.

According to Emily Yellin, many of the key foot soldiers in the USO's mission were women who were "charged with providing friendly diversion for U.S. troops who were mostly men in their teens and twenties." USO centers throughout the world recruited female volunteers to serve doughnuts, dance, and just talk with the troops. USO historian Julia Carson writes that this "nostalgic hour," designed to cheer and comfort soldiers, involved "listening to music – American style" and "looking at pretty girls, like no other pretty girls in the world – American girls."

African-American women scrambled to rally the community around the soldiers and create programs for them. By 1946, hostesses had served more than two thousand soldiers a day while also providing facilities for the wounded and convalescent who were on leave. They went to black businesses and fraternal organizations in order to find sponsorship for their USO group, and later expanded to fulfill the needs of soldiers during the Korean War. Moreover, they worked to merge black and white USOs into one desegregated unit. As black historian Megan Shockley noted, "Their work for the desegregation of USOs had begun during World War II, and it finally paid off."

Women were also key entertainers who performed at shows. Stars such as Marlene Dietrich, Judy Garland, Betty Grable and Rita Hayworth had traveled over a million miles. Yellin notes that on one tour, Hayworth visited six camps, gave thousands of autographs, and "came back from Texas with a full-fledged nervous breakdown from over-enthusiasm!" Opera singer Lily Pons, after she had performed a "serious" opera song to troops in Burma, "an applause erupted that stunned even the most seasoned performers." She later wrote in a letter, "Every woman back home wears a halo now, and those who represent her had better keep theirs on, too."

Author Joeie Dee pointed out that "for women entertainers, traveling with the USO made it possible to be patriots and adventurers as well as professionals." She adds, however, that the G.I.s in the USO audiences "tended to see these women in a different light – as reminders of and even substitutes for their girls back home, as a reward for fighting the war, as embodiments of what they were fighting for." Edward Skvarna remembers 1943, when he met Donna Reed at a USO canteen and asked her to dance. "I had never danced with a celebrity before, so I felt delighted, privileged even, to meet her. ... But I really felt she was like a girl from back home." Jay Fultz, author of a biography of Reed, states that soldiers "often wrote to her as if to a sister or the girl next door, confiding moments of homesickness, loneliness, privation and anxiety."

Like much of American society and its World War II military, USOs were segregated. In Riverside, California a Negro USO was established to serve the March Field service population. Celebrities visiting this USO included Clarence Muse and the Mantan Moreland & Ben Carter duo.

==== Women entertainers ====
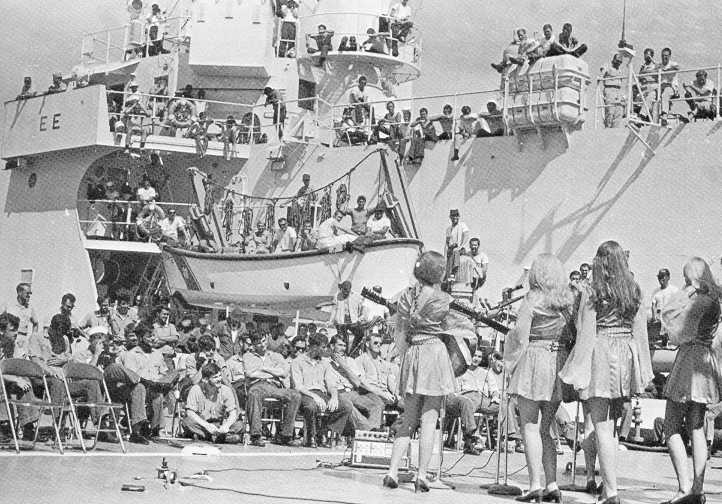
US Coast Guard, 1st show in Vietnam, 1970

One female entertainer wrote about conditions while performing:

We've played to audiences, many of them ankle deep in mud, huddled under the ponchos in the pouring rain (it breaks your heart the first two or three times to see men so hungry for entertainment.) We've played on uncovered stages, when we, as well as the audience, got rain-soaked. We've played with huge tropical bugs flying in our hair and faces; we've played to audiences of thousands of men, audiences spreading from our very feet to far up a hillside and many sitting in the trees. ... We've played to audiences in small units of 500 or so, and much oftener to audiences of 8 to 10,000. Every night we play a different place.

Singer-actress-dancer Ann Miller described performing for badly wounded soldiers. She did forty-eight shows for "broken soldiers," who were mostly lying on stretchers in the lobbies of hotels, watching as she entertained them. Yellin writes, "During her last show she collapsed and had to be taken home on an Army airplane." Afterwards, Miller described the experience:

We went from ward to ward to ward, singing and dancing and trying to boost the morale of these men. It was just hell. ... I just fell apart and I think the shock of seeing those men with their arms and legs blown off – it was just frightening. But when you do it, you do it. You try to help them, try to sing and dance. You try to keep their spirits up. It's heartbreaking.

=== Korean War ===
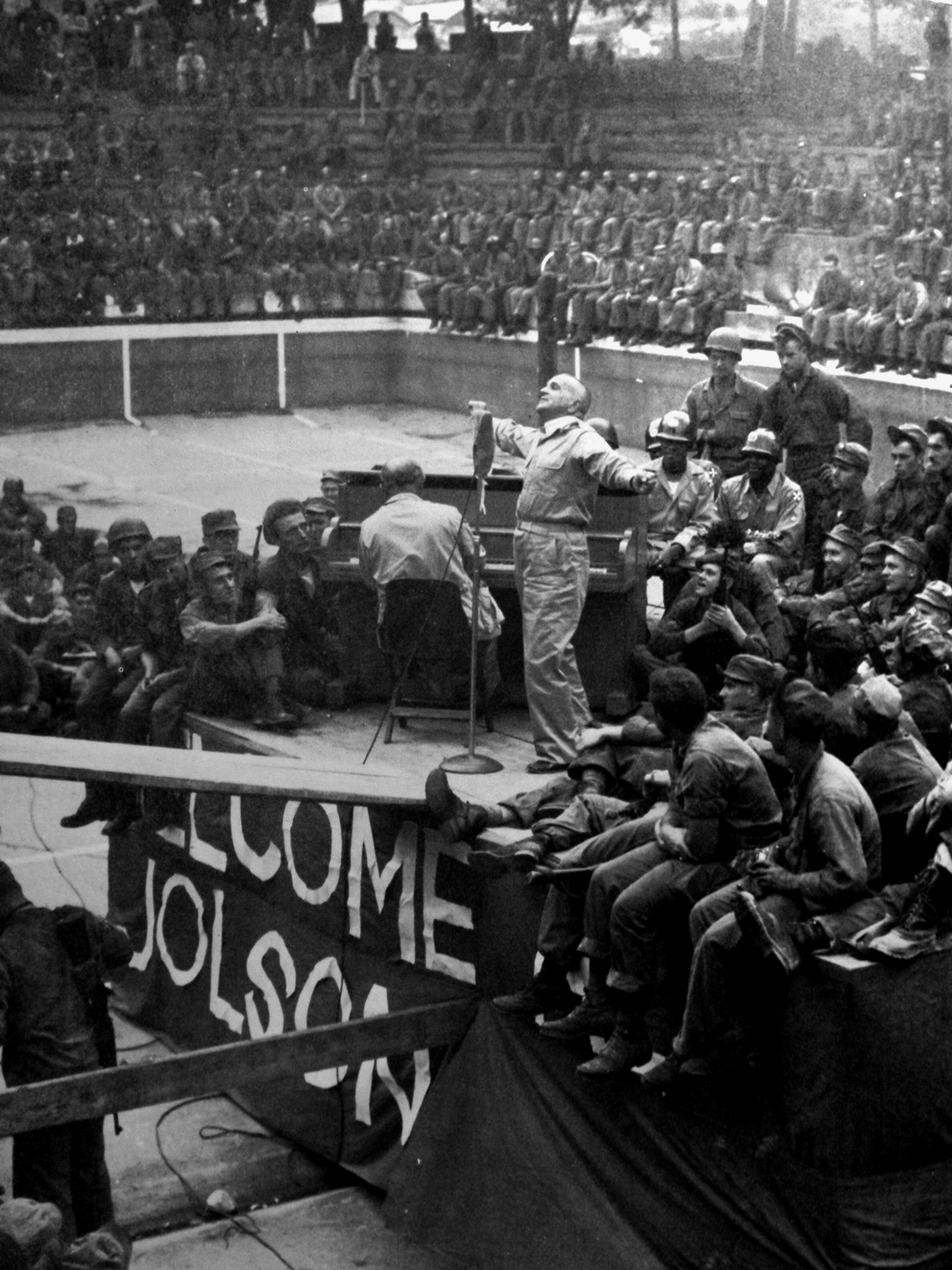
Al Jolson, the first star to perform in Korea, September 17, 1950

In 1947, the USO was disbanded, due partly to lack of funds. In 1951, when the United States entered the Korean War, Secretary of Defense George Marshall and Secretary of the Navy Francis P. Matthews requested that the USO be reactivated "to provide support for the men and women of the armed forces with help of the American people." According to war historian Paul Edwards, between 1952 and 1953, not a day went by without the USO providing services somewhere in Korea. At home or overseas, in 1952 it was serving 3.5 million in the armed forces using much the same methods of operation as it did in World War II.

Many stars, both well-known and new, came to perform, including Bob Hope, Errol Flynn, Debbie Reynolds, Piper Laurie, Jane Russell, Paul Douglas, Terry Moore, Marilyn Monroe, Danny Kaye, Rory Calhoun, Mickey Rooney, Linda Coleman, Al Jolson, Pérez Prado, Evita Muñoz and many others. Jolson was the first to volunteer, but due to lack of USO funds traveled to Korea at his own expense (he was also the first to entertain troops during World War II).

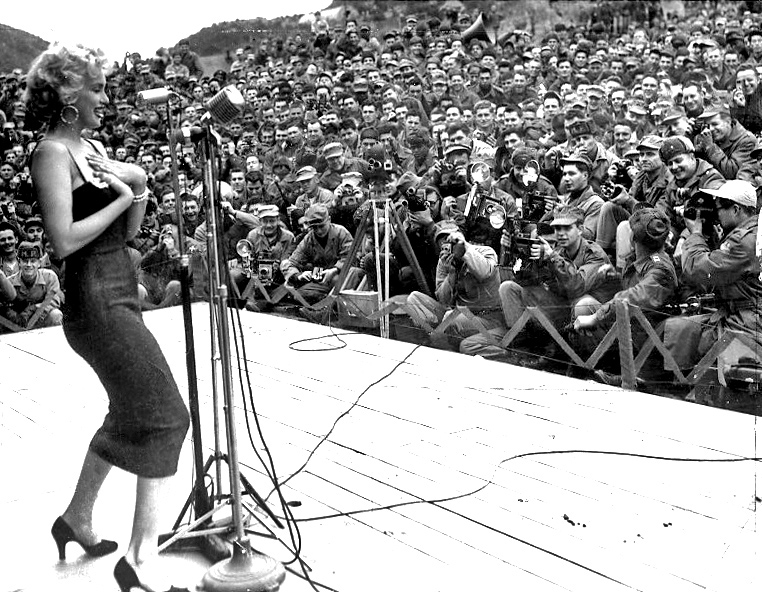
Marilyn Monroe performing in Korea, 1954

Veterans have recalled many of the USOs events, sometimes in vivid detail:

On that cold, overcast day, there were more than five thousand troops in the audience. They sat on the ground or up on the hillside. When everyone was settled, Danny Kaye opened the show by going to the microphone, looking at his large audience, and shouting, "Who's holding back the enemy?" The GIs roared with laughter. We were thrilled to have Kaye and his entertainers in our area. We especially liked the young women in the show. Danny was okay, with his stories and jokes, but after all, we knew what American men looked like.

Author Linda Granfield in describing the show, writes, "For two hours, the men could forget they were soldiers at war. After the show, they returned to the fighting in the hills. Some in that audience never made it back." By the end of the war, over 113,000 American USO volunteers were working at 294 centers at home and abroad. And 126 units had given 5,422 performances to servicemen in Korea and the wounded in Japan.

=== Vietnam War ===
The USO was in Vietnam before the first combat troops arrived, with the first USO club opened in Saigon in April 1963. The 23 centers in Vietnam and Thailand served as many as a million service members a month, and the USO presented more than 5,000 performances during the Vietnam War featuring stars such as John Wayne, Ann-Margret, Sammy Davis Jr., Raymond Burr, Phyllis Diller, Martha Raye, Joey Heatherton, Wayne Newton, Jayne Mansfield, Redd Foxx, Rosey Grier, Anita Bryant, Nancy Sinatra, Jimmy Hawkins, Jimmy Boyd, Lola Falana, George Peppard, Raquel Welch, Jill St. John and Bob Hope. Philip Ahn, the first actor of Korean descent to become a Hollywood star, became the first Asian American USO performer to entertain troops in Vietnam.

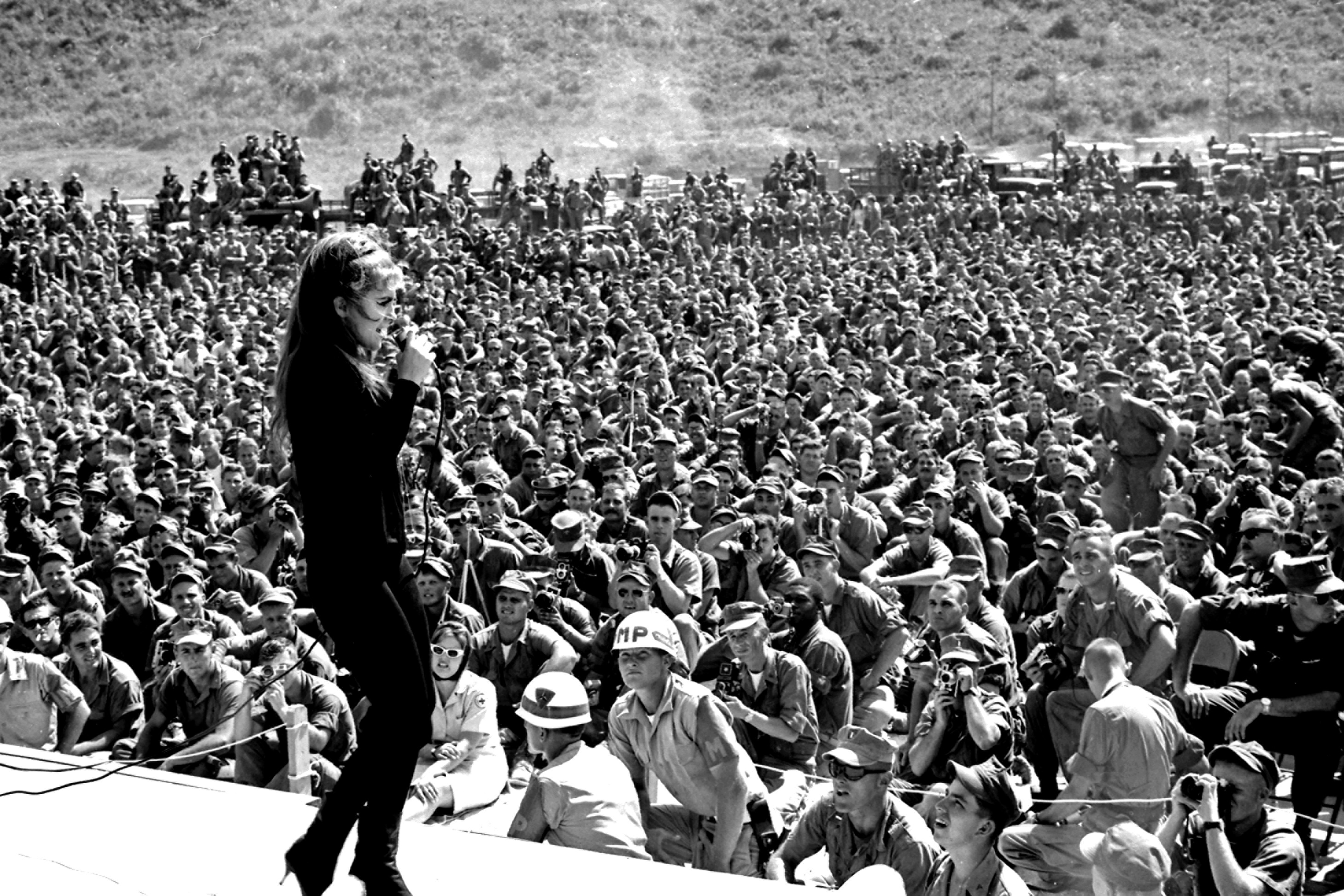
Ann-Margret performing in Vietnam, 1966

In addition, the USO operated centers at major U.S. airports to provide a lounge and place to sleep for American servicemen between their flights. Vietnam historian James Westheider noted that the USO "tried to bring a little America to Vietnam." Volunteer American civilians, who did 18-month tours, staffed the clubs. According to Westheider, "The young women wore miniskirts – no slacks were allowed." Each club had a snack bar, gift shops, a barbershop, photo developing, overseas phone lines, and hot showers.

When providing entertainment, the USO did its best to attract known stars from back home to help relieve the stresses of war. Senator John Kerry recalled how important this kind of diversion would become. He remembered a "Bob Hope Follies" USO show, which included actress Ann-Margret, Miss America, football star Rosey Grier, and others. According to Kerry biographer Douglas Brinkley, "When the Swift finally made it back to the My Tho River, the crew confronted the heartbreaking sight of a huge Navy landing craft ferrying the troops back. The USO show was over." Kerry later wrote, "The visions of Ann Margret and Miss America and all the other titillating personalities who would have made us feel so at home hung around us for a while until we saw three Chinook helicopters take off from the field and presumed that our dreams had gone with them."

But for GIs who saw the show, it was worth it: "We turned to watch Ann perform, and for about two minutes of American beauty, the war was forgotten. Everyone fully understood just what was really worth fighting for. ... The show was fantastic, but the escape the Bob Hope tour provided us in expectation for days before, and after, helped us keep in touch with what we were there for – God, Country, apple pie ... and Ann-Margret!"

The visits by the stars meant a lot to the men and women in Vietnam. "It was not just the entertainment; it meant that they were not forgotten that far away from home," writes Westheider. He adds that the tours made a "deep impression" on the stars as well. Singer and actress Connie Stevens remembered her 1969 tour with Bob Hope, when she decided to go despite the fact she had two children both under the age of two. Today, she claims that "veterans were still stopping her and thanking her for visiting Vietnam over 30 years later."

Similarly, Ann-Margret during a book signing was approached by a veteran who asked her to sign a photo he took of her performing in Vietnam. Although the book's publishing representative for the signing event would not allow her to sign anything other than her book, the veteran's wife recalls:

She took one look at the photo, tears welled up in her eyes, and she said, 'This is one of my gentlemen from Viet Nam and I most certainly will sign his photo. I know what these men did for their country and I always have time for 'my gentlemen.'

In November–December 1968 the Sig Sakowitz troop from Chicago performed over 36 shows in South Vietnam with the USO in: Pleiku, Dalat, Danang, Cam Ran Bay, Phu Bai, Phu Loy, Hue, Natrang, Tan Son Nhut Airbase, Saigon and places in the boonies known only to military intelligence and the lonely soldiers yearning for a taste of home. The troop consisted of Doublemint Twins Terrie and Jennie Frankel, Gaslight Club singer Sara Sue, Comedian Tony Diamond and personality Sig Sakowitz. Shows were also performed with comedian Joey Bishop of the Rat Pack.

George Peppard, stage, TV and motion picture actor, arrived in Vietnam for a USO HANDSHAKE TOUR in 1970 to visit the military in the hospitals and out in the "boonies."... His showed a keen interest in the men's mission while they were hungry for news of life back in the "World."... Polaroid pictures were taken by Mr. Peppard's escort officer, autographed, and given to the men.

=== Lebanese peacekeeping ===
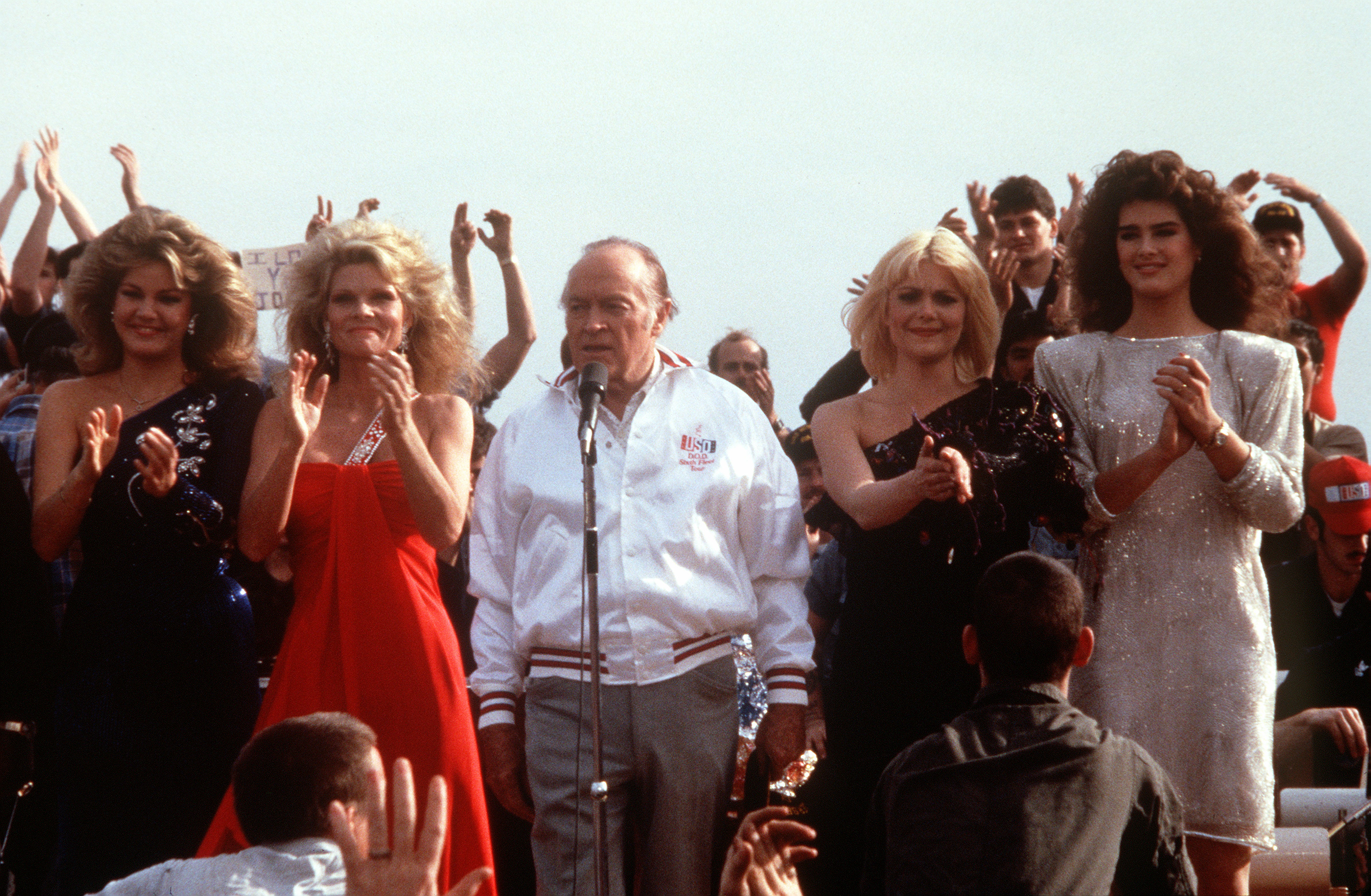
Entertainers during a Christmas Eve USO show in 1983 on board the USS New Jersey off the coast of Beirut, Lebanon. (left to right) Miss USA Julie Hayek, Cathy Lee Crosby, Bob Hope, Ann Jillian and Brooke Shields.

In 1983, a bloody civil war was raging in Lebanon. In an effort to stop the violence in the region a Multinational Force of peacekeepers composed largely of U.S., Italian and French armed service members was created and sent to the region to attempt a restoration of order. As part of the multinational force the United States mobilized an expeditionary force composed of members of the United States Marine Corps and elements of the United States Sixth Fleet which operated out of the Mediterranean Sea.

Carrying on a tradition he had begun in World War II of spending Christmas with U.S. forces overseas, Bob Hope and his troupe of entertainers gave a show on board the battleship USS New Jersey on December 24, 1983. Four hundred Marines stationed in Beirut attended the show.

=== Italy ===
American troops have been deployed in Italy since the end of World War II. In 1988, a car bomb targeted the USO club in Naples, which killed five people including a U.S. Navy officer.

=== Gulf War ===
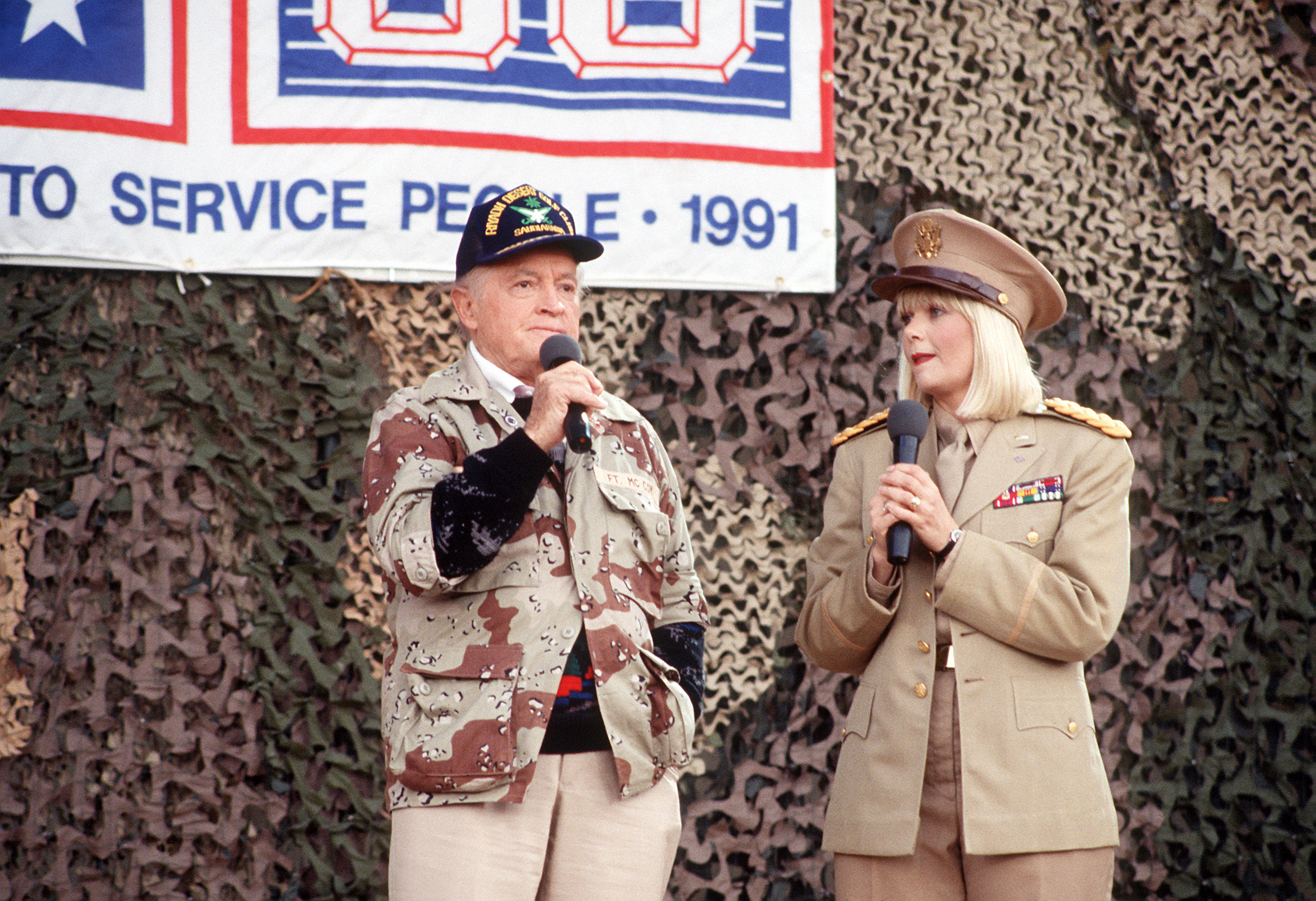
Bob Hope and Ann Jillian perform at the USO Christmas Tour during Operation Desert Shield

To support troops participating in Operation Desert Shield, USO centers opened in Saudi Arabia. Entertainers performing for the troops included Bob Hope, Jay Leno, Steve Martin, Delta Burke, Ann Jillian, Gerald McRaney, Marie Osmond, the Pointer Sisters, country singer Gina James, and Bob Hope on his final USO tour.

=== Afghanistan and Iraq ===
To support troops participating in Operations Enduring Freedom and Iraqi Freedom, USO centers opened in Afghanistan, Iraq, Kuwait and Qatar. USO centers number more than 160 around the world. In those years, the USO opened centers at Fort Campbell, Kentucky; Fort Riley, Kansas; Fort Bliss, Texas; Fort Carson, Colorado; and Afghanistan. The USO provides a variety of programs and services, including orientation programs, family events, free Internet and e-mail access, free drinks and snacks, free phone calls home and recreation services. One of the newer programs, called "USO in a Box," delivers program materials ranging from DVD players and videos to musical instruments to remote forward operating bases in Afghanistan.

U.S. military personnel and their families visit USO centers more than eight million times each year.

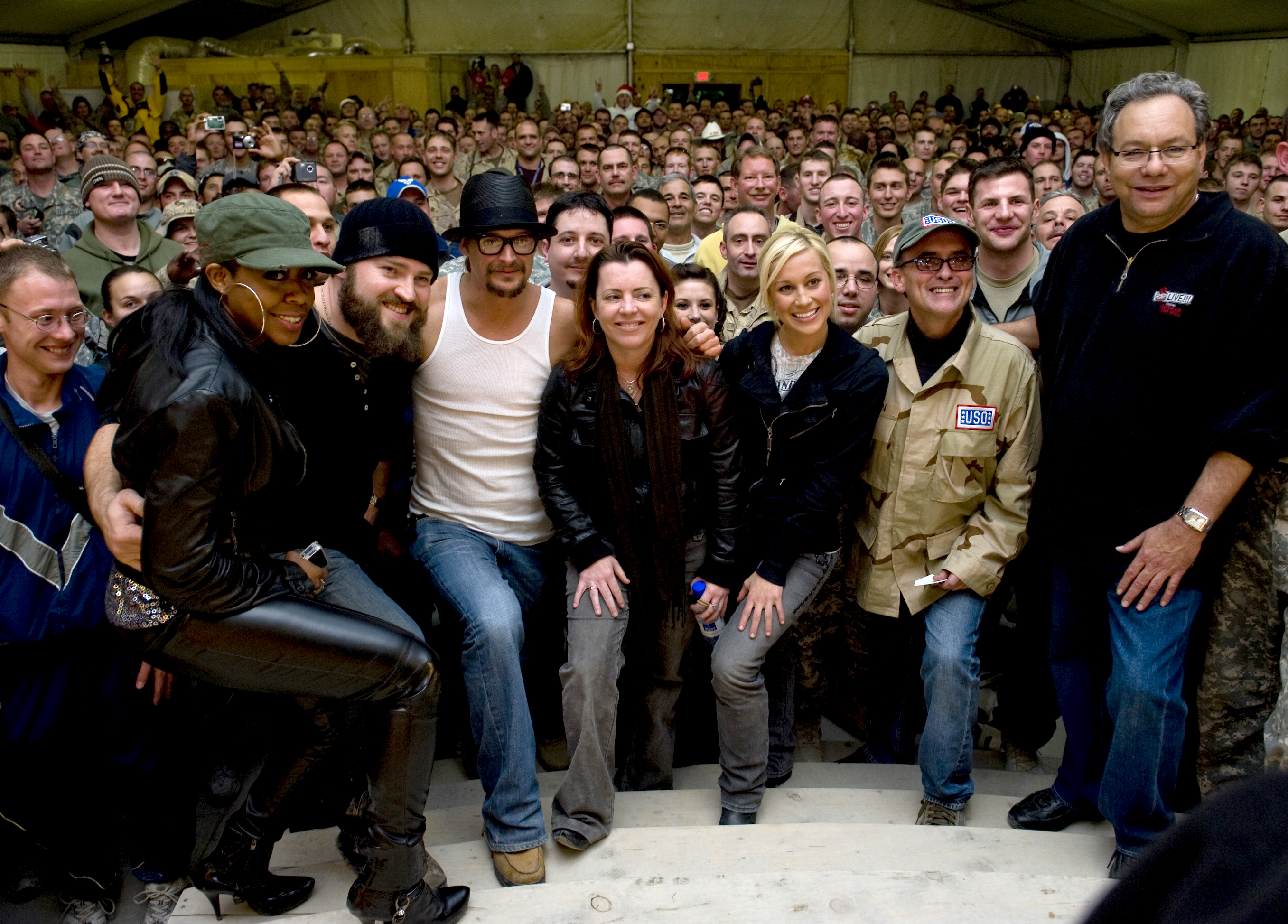
Tichina Arnold, Zac Brown, Kid Rock, Kathleen Madigan, Kellie Pickler, John Bowman, and Lewis Black at 2008 USO Holiday Tour in Kandahar, Afghanistan

Bruce Willis visited Baghdad, Camp Kir Kush and Camp Caldwell, Iraq around December 2003.

From June 8 to 11, 2009, TV personality Stephen Colbert traveled to Iraq to film his show The Colbert Report for four days in a USO-sponsored event.

Other entertainers who have traveled to the Middle East to perform include Karri Turner (from the TV show JAG), Al Franken (who made six USO tours in Kosovo, Iraq and Afghanistan before being elected a United States Senator from Minnesota), Robin Williams, Craig Ferguson, Gary Sinise, Zac Brown, Five Finger Death Punch, Artie Lange, Gary Dell'Abate, Nick DiPaolo, Jim Florentine, Jim Norton, Dave Attell, Avenged Sevenfold, Jessica Simpson, Carrie Underwood, Drowning Pool, Toby Keith (with special guest Gina James), Montgomery Gentry, Kellie Pickler, Mayra Veronica, Carlos Mencia, O.A.R., Trace Adkins, Kathleen Madigan, Louis C.K., Dane Cook, Lewis Black, Third Day, Colin Quinn, Kathy Griffin, and Neil McCoy.

The USO has provided services for the annual "Tribute to the Troops" special of World Wrestling Entertainment. They have aired WWE RAW from Afghanistan and Iraq every Christmas in the United States in a pre-taped show from the combat zone.

== Services ==
The USO provides services to troops before, during, and after deployment through staffed and unstaffed USO centers inside and outside combat zones.

=== Operation Phone Home ===
USO centers in combat zones provide free phone calls home and internet access to service members through its private telephone network and high-speed internet.

=== Bob Hope Legacy Reading Program ===
The Bob Hope Legacy Reading program allows service members to record and send a video of themselves reading a book to their children at home.

=== USO Care Package Program ===
The organization sends toiletry and snack care packages to servicemen including travel-sized hygiene products of which 170,000 were shipped in 2019, healthy snacks, and drink mixes. During the COVID-19 pandemic, the organization assembled thousands of care packages for troops in mandatory 14-day quarantine en-route home.

=== USO Special Delivery ===
The USO hosts baby showers for military parents-to-be. The baby showers allow pregnant military spouses to network and form a community while their spouses are deployed.

=== USO2GO ===
USO2GO is a service that provides customizable kits to military servicemen stationed in areas without a USO Center containing toiletries and snacks, furniture, electronics, and/or anything else they might need. Since 2008, the USO has shipped more than 2,000 kits to places like Afghanistan, Iraq, Egypt, and others.

=== Entertainment ===
The USO has hosted more than 8.1 million center celebrity visits across the world.

== Honoring Bob Hope ==
In 1997, the U.S. Congress honored Bob Hope by declaring him the "first and only honorary veteran of the U.S. armed forces." According to Hope biographer William Faith, his reputation has become ingrained in the "American consciousness" because he had flown millions of miles to entertain G.I.s during both wartime and peace. His contribution to the USO began in 1941 and ended with Operation Desert Shield in 1991, spending 48 Christmases overseas with American service personnel. He was always treated as "an asset to the U.S. Government with his willingness to entertain whenever they needed him." After WWII was declared over, the USO had sent out an "impassioned bulletin" asking entertainers not to abandon the GIs now that the war was over. Hope was among the first to say yes. The Military Order of the Purple Heart notes that "his contributions to the USO are well known: they are legend."

As a result of his non-stop entertainment to both the civilian population and the military, he received numerous other honors over the years: a C-17 Air Force plane was named The Spirit of Bob Hope; a naval vessel was named the USNS Bob Hope; and streets, schools, hospitals, and a golf tournament were also named in his honor. A Senate resolution declared him "a part of American folklore." The Guinness Book of Records called him the most honored entertainer ever. And during his 1993 televised birthday celebration, when he turned 90, General Colin Powell saluted Hope "for his tireless USO trouping", which was followed by onstage tributes from all branches of the armed forces. General William Westmoreland spoke about his loyalty to the GI throughout the gritty Vietnam years. And bandleader Les Brown, who was with him during many of his tours, mentioned that his band "had seen more of Hope's ass in the last forty years than any of Hope's immediate family."

War correspondent Quentin Reynolds wrote in 1943, "He and his troupe would do 300 miles in a jeep, and give four shows ... One of the generals said Hope was a first rate military target since he was worth a division; that that's about 15,000 men. Presumably the Nazis appreciated Hope's value, since they thrice bombed towns while the comic was there."

During the Vietnam War, Hope produced a number of high-rated television specials and began to perceive that the U.S. media had given him a broad endorsement to continue on his work in Vietnam. Soon after his Christmas show in Saigon in 1967, he learned that the Viet Cong had planned to launch an attack at the hotel Hope's troupe was staying at, missing them by ten minutes. According to Faith, he was later "mystified and... increasingly intolerant of the pockets of dissent. Draft-card burnings on college campuses angered him". Hope wrote in a magazine article that "Can you imagine, that people in America are burning their draft cards to show their opposition and that some of them are actually rooting for your defeat?" In the spring of 1973, Hope began writing his fifth book, The Last Christmas Show, which was dedicated to "the men and women of the armed forces and to those who also served by worrying and waiting." He signed over his royalties to the USO.

His final Christmas show was during Operation Desert Shield in 1990. The show was not easy, notes Faith. "There were so many restrictions. Hope's jokes were monitored by the State Department to avoid offending the Saudis ... and the media was restricted from covering the shows... Because in Saudi Arabia national custom prescribes that women must be veiled in public, Ann Jillian, Marie Osmond, and the Pointer Sisters were left off Hope's Christmas Eve show."

In 2009, Stephen Colbert performing his last episode of weeklong taping in Iraq for his The Colbert Report show, carried a golf club on stage and dedicated it to Bob Hope's service for the USO.

== Accountability ==
The USO has a paid staff of approximately 800. According to the organization's website, more than 21,000 USO volunteers contributed 1.2 million hours of service in 2024.

The Charity Navigator gave the United Service Organizations the following ratings (out of 4-stars) for 2024:

- Overall rating: 4-star
- Impact & Measurement: 4-star
- Accountability & Finance, most recent fiscal year, 2022: 4-star
- Culture & Community: 4-star
- Leadership & Adaptability: 4-star

== In popular culture ==
- In the 1979 Steven Spielberg comedy film 1941, a riot breaks out during a swing dance contest at USO Club in Hollywood.
- In a 1999 episode of the military TV series JAG, the USO is featured in a storyline taking place at Christmas 1969
- Captain America is seen performing in a USO tour during World War II in Marvel's Captain America: The First Avenger.
- In the Amazon Prime show The Marvelous Mrs. Maisel's Season 3 premiere "Strike up the Band", Midge Maisel performs at a 1959 USO show alongside fictional jazz and pop singer Shy Baldwin.
- The members of American rock band My Chemical Romance are portrayed as USO members in sections of the music video for their 2004 song "The Ghost of You".
- Pitch Perfect 3 (2017) revolves around the a-capella group the Barden Bellas performing via the USO for servicemen in multiple European nations with DJ Khaled (among others).
- In episodes 1 and 2 of season 10 of the TV series M*A*S*H (1972–1983), the staff of the 4077th host a touring USO show that brings an unexpected touch of vaudeville to the 4077th when the star showgirl requires an emergency operation.

== See also ==
- Entertainments National Service Association (ENSA), an organisation established to provide entertainment for British armed forces personnel during World War II
