= Dorothy Thomas (writer) =

American author and diarist

Dorothy Thomas (August 13, 1898 – September 28, 1990) was an American author and diarist, best known for her short stories.

== Personal life ==
Dorothy Thomas was born in Barnes, Kansas, the sixth of nine children born to Willard and Augusta Thomas. In 1905, The Thomases moved to Alberta, Canada and settled in a log cabin on Battle Lake, but after Willard's death in 1909, the rural existence became too taxing for Augusta. She moved the family back to Kansas in 1912, but they departed shortly afterwards to establish a more permanent home in Bethany, Nebraska.

In her writing, Thomas frequently referenced her personal life. While at a writing retreat in Yaddo, Thomas fell in love with a writer, Leonard Ehrlich. However, Thomas later wrote that the end of the relationship "pulled a ligament in my personality." After her relationship with Ehrlich, Thomas lived in Rio Grande Valley, New Mexico, New York City, Vernon, New Jersey and the US Virgin Islands.

On Valentine's Day in 1959, Thomas was married to John Buickerood in Vernon, New Jersey. The couple never had children. Thomas died of a stroke shortly after her husband died in 1990. Her body had also been weakened by Myasthenia Gravis for a long period of time prior to her stroke.

== Education ==
Dorothy did not attend school until she was 12. After moving to Lincoln with her mother and siblings, she dropped out of high school and acquired a Second Grade teaching certificate in order to support her family at the age of 16. She also attended Cotner College for two semesters and the University of Nebraska at Lincoln for one semester but did not graduate from either.

She obtained a Second Grade teaching certificate in 1918 and taught elementary and secondary school for the next ten years. In 1929, Thomas quit teaching to focus solely on her writing. She would continue writing for over 50 years.

== Career ==
Thomas' works range from the sentimental to the satirical, frequently "[challenging] stereotypes of good-hearted country people." They follow the lives of female protagonists who are, according to Thomas scholar Christine Pappas, "self-reliant but flawed women." These women defy the social expectations of their respective places and times, just as Thomas herself defied social expectation by creating female characters whom her mother Augusta labelled "unlovely" in an expression of her disapproval, which she included in a letter to her daughter.

As an emerging author, Thomas sold short stories to periodicals such as Scribner's and American Mercury. Thomas' short stories quickly brought her notability and critical acclaim. Her short stories were published in multiple literary journals and magazines such as Prairie Schooner, Atlantic Monthly, Good Housekeeping, Ladies Home Journal, and The New Yorker.

At the behest of Alfred A. Knopf, Thomas collected many of her short stories into two short story cycles:The Home Place and Ma Jeeter's Girls. Both of these works were published as "novels" and met with popular success. She teamed with illustrator Ruth Gannett to write a children's book Hi-Po the Hippo, published by Random House. Thomas published another novel entitled The Getaway, named for her most famous short story. The Nebraska Press describes the novel as "twelve stories...concerned with the flaws in familial relationships."

== List of published works ==
- "The Goat" (1927)
- "Three Blue Doves" (1929)
- "Ma Jeeter's Girls" (1931)
- "A Jeeter Wedding" (1931)
- "Agusta and the Big Brewer's Horses" (1932)
- "Up In The Hills" (1935)
- "Christmas Morning (from Home Place)" (1936)
- "Helen, I've Seen Your Father" (1937)
- "The Car" (1938)
- "Morning" (1939)
- "Star Light, Star Bright" (1939)
- "After Many Mysteries" (early 1940s)
- "The Handkerchiefs" (1940)
- "We'll Not Speak of It" (1941)
- "My Pigeon Pair" (1941)
- "Hi-Po the Hippo" (1942)
- "Love is a Proud and Gentle Thing" (1942)
- "We Got Back" (1945)
- "Never Said a Word" (1947)
- "Impatient Bridegroom" (1948)
- "Mina's Man Trap" (1961)
- "A Word Fitfully Spoken" (1961)
- "Of Day of Rest and Gladness or Angels Ever Bright and Fair" (1964–5)
- "The Car" (1984)
- "Another Lilac Time" (1989)
