= Rebecca Hourwich Reyher =

American author, lecturer, and suffragist

The members of the "Flying Caravan" of the People's Mandate Committee were bid goodbye by Sumner Welles at the State Department. In the photograph, left to right: Rebecca Hourwich Reyher, Mrs. Ana Del Pulgar de Burke, Mrs. E.V. Frost, Mrs. Burton W. Musser, and Welles.

Rebecca Hourwich Reyher (1897–1987) was an American writer, lecturer, and suffragist. She was the head of the New York and Boston offices of the National Woman's Party. Her works include the Caldecott Honor book My Mother Is the Most Beautiful Woman in the World (1945).

== Early life ==
Reyher was born into a middle-class, Russian immigrant, secular Jewish family. Her father Isaac A. Hourwich was an attorney. He had been exiled to Siberia for his revolutionary activities, later escaping and immigrating to the United States by the early 1890s. A Columbia University economics graduate, he became a professor and wrote extensively on the topic of immigration. Reyher's mother, Lisa Jaffe Hourwich, was the daughter of a Ukrainian-Jewish school teacher. Lisa's father left the Russian Empire and immigrated to the United States when Lisa was twenty-six. Lisa also worked as a teacher. Rebecca wrote in her oral memoir that her mother's career inspired her own "passionate support" for women's careers.

In 1917 she married Ferdinand Reyher, and in 1919 they had a daughter called Faith. They divorced in 1934.

== Career ==
She traveled to Africa six times, with the first trip being in 1924, and this inspired two books, Zulu Woman (1948) and The Fon and His Hundred Wives (1952). She also wrote many articles about Africa, and contributed to Speaker for Suffrage and Petitioner for Peace, a memoir by Mabel Vernon. Other contributors to that memoir were Consuelo Reyes-Calderon, Fern S. Ingersoll, and Hazel Hunkins Hallinan.

Between 1935 and 1937 she worked as a regional director of the Works Progress Administration for New York and New England, and from 1937 to 1939 as assistant to the director of the WPA’s Information and Motion Pictures Service.

In 1937 she left America as part of the "Flying Caravan" of delegates of the People's Mandate Committee, which went to South America and was meant to urge ratification of the peace treaties adopted at the Buenos Aires Conference of 1936, and to create support for a petition demanding that governments reject war.

In the 1940s she produced a morning radio series, Have Fun with Your Children, on New York station WNYC. She was a grandmother by this time and was known as Becky Reyher. She also published two children's books, Babies and Puppies Are Fun! (1944) and My Mother is the Most Beautiful Woman in the World (1945), and edited two other books, The Stork Run, a Collection of Baby Cartoons (1944) and Babies Keep Coming, An Anthology (1947). She also published numerous magazine articles throughout her career.

In the 1960s he was a lecturer on the topic of women and Africa at schools, including the New School for Social Research and New York University.

Her daughter, Faith Reyher Jackson, followed in her footsteps as an author and journalist and was also a dancer, choreographer, and headmistress of the Academy of The Washington Ballet.
