= Carolyn Sherwin Bailey =

American writer (1875–1961)

- Born: October 25, 1875; Hoosick Falls, New York
- Died: December 23, 1961 (aged 86); Concord, Massachusetts
- Education: Teachers' College, Columbia
- Occupation: Writer
- Spouse: Eben C. Hill (m. 1936)
- Writing career
- Notable awards: Newbery Medal; 1947

Carolyn Sherwin Bailey (1875–1961) was an American children's author.

== Early life and education ==
Carolyn Sherwin Bailey was born in Hoosick Falls, New York on October 25, 1875, to Charles Henry and Emma Frances (née Blanchard) Bailey. Her father was a scientist and traveler, while her mother was a teacher and writer. She had one sister.

Bailey studied at home until age 12, then later attended Lansingburgh Academy before graduating from the Teachers College, Columbia University in 1896. She also attended the Montessori School in Rome and the New York School of Social Work.

== Career ==
"What Happened In Chestnut Grove", a vintage Arbor Day story, by Carolyn Sherwin Bailey, from her book Stories For Every Holiday, published 1918

Bailey began her career as a public school teacher, then as a social worker.

Bailey contributed to the Ladies' Home Journal and other magazines. She published volumes of stories for children like methods of story telling, teaching children and other related subjects, which include Boys and Girls of Colonial Days (1917), Broad Stripes and Bright Stars (1919), Hero Stories (1919); Tops and Whistles (1937), and The Little Rabbit Who Wanted Red Wings (1945). She wrote For the Children's Hour (1906) in collaboration with Clara M. Lewis.

She also wrote on arts and crafts and her works Children of the Handcrafts (1935), Tops and Whistles, Stories of Early American Toys and Children (1937), Homespun Playdays (1940), and Pioneer Art in America (1944), are thought by some critics to be her finest achievements.

An uncharacteristic book, Miss Hickory (1946), won the 1947 Newbery Medal.

== Personal life ==
In 1936, Baily married Eben Clayton Hill, a researcher at Johns Hopkins University. The couple lived on a large property in Temple, New Hampshire.

She died in Concord, Massachusetts on December 24, 1961.
