= Alice Morgan Wright =

American sculptor, suffragist and animal welfare activist

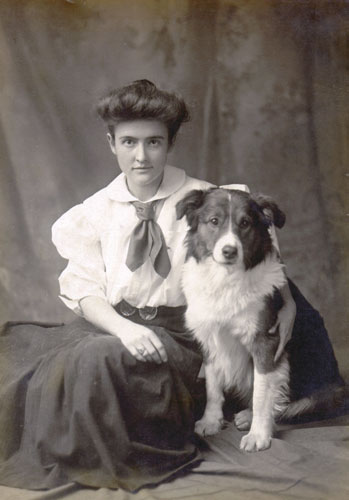
- Sophia Smith Collection/Alice Morgan Wright (Smith class 1904)
- Born: October 10, 1881; Albany, New York
- Died: April 8, 1975 (aged 93); Albany, New York
- Resting place: Albany Rural Cemetery, Menands, New York
- Education: Académie Colarossi; Art Students League of New York; Smith College; École nationale supérieure des Beaux-Arts
- Occupations: Artist, Suffragist, Activist
- Partner: Edith J. Goode

Alice Morgan Wright (October 10, 1881 – April 8, 1975) was an American sculptor, suffragist, and animal welfare activist. She was one of the first American artists to embrace Cubism and Futurism.

== Early life and education ==
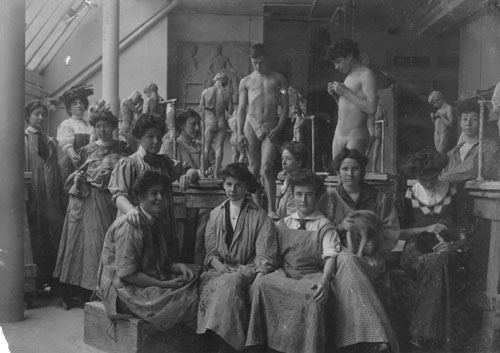
Alice Morgan Wright Papers. Alice Morgan Wright (seated third from left) with other students and models in art class

Wright came from an old Albany, New York family. She was born October 10, 1881, in Albany, to Henry Romeyn Wright, a prosperous wholesale grocer, and Emma Jane Morgan.

A student at St. Agnes School in Albany (now Doane Stuart School), Wright graduated from Smith College in 1904 and continued her studies, in sculpture, at the Art Students League of New York. The League awarded Wright both the Gutzon Borglum and the Augustus Saint-Gaudens prizes for her outstanding art work.

Prohibited from attending life studies while attending the Art Students League, Wright watched local boxing and wrestling competitions in order to study the human form.

In 1909, Wright went to Paris, where she attended the École des Beaux-Arts and the Académie Colarossi. In Paris she was a pupil of Injalbert and in New York she studied with Gutzon Borglum, James Earle Fraser and Hermon Atkins MacNeil.

== Career ==
=== Artist ===
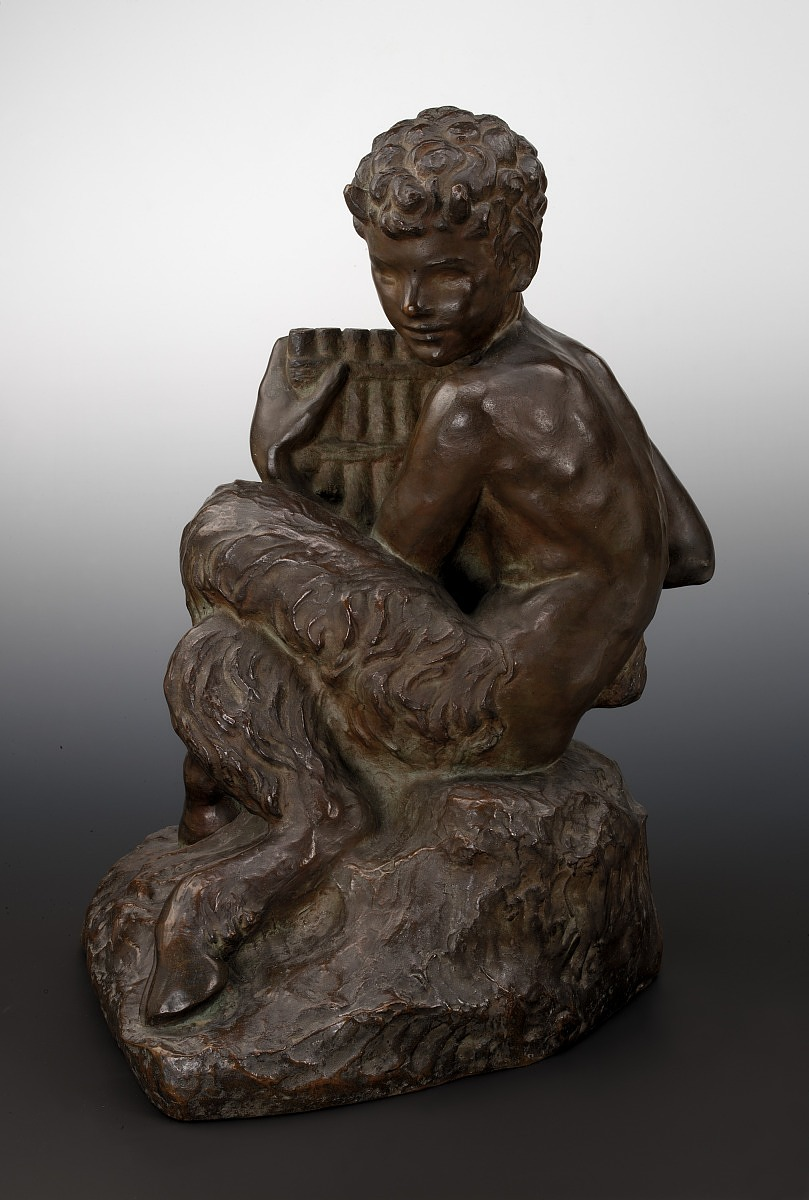
Faun (1915)

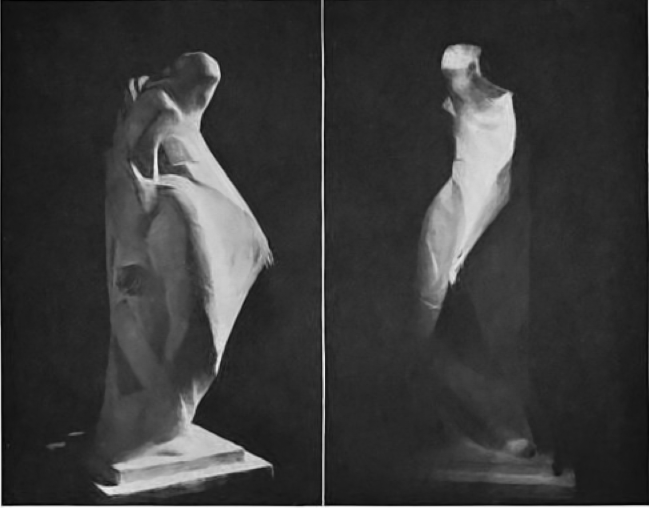
Medea

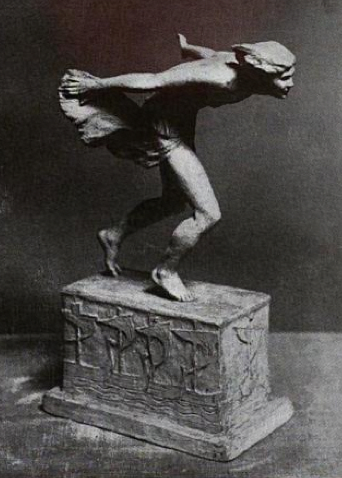
The Off-Shore Wind

She exhibited domestically at the Art Institute of Chicago and the Art Institute of Philadelphia, and her work appeared in Europe at the Royal Academy of Arts (London) and the Salon des Beaux Arts (Paris). She was a member of the National Association of Women Painters and Sculptors as well as a founding member and director of the Society of Independent Artists.

"The Fist," perhaps her best known sculpture, shows the modernist influence of Auguste Rodin; other works, like "Medea" (1920), integrated avant-garde Cubist and even Futurist elements. It is likely influenced by the struggle for women's voting rights. Wright also produced more conventional pieces throughout her career. Wright worked slowly and often moved back and forth between a conservative and a more experimental style.

Wright was a member of the National Sculpture Society. She exhibited two pieces, Wind Figure, a stone carving and Young Faun, a bronze statuette, at the Societies 1923 exhibition. Her very abstracted work Medea was shown at the 1929 exhibition.

Betsy Fahlman curated a retrospective exhibit of Wright's work in 1978 at the Albany Institute of History & Art titled Sculpture and Suffrage: The Art and Life of Alice Morgan Wright (1881–1975).

By 1945, Wright had abandoned art in favor of her animal rights activism.

=== Suffragist ===
Wright was also an ardent suffragist. She worked for the Collegiate Equal Suffrage League. While studying art in Europe, Wright involved herself in both the British and French suffrage movements; notably, Wright organized a meeting in Paris where English suffragist Emmeline Pankhurst spoke. Wright also arranged for Pankhurst to make an appearance in Albany during her tour of the United States in 1911.

With the national Women's Social and Political Union, she participated in militant demonstrations in England. She was incarcerated for two months in Holloway Prison, London. With other suffragettes, she protested her treatment by participating in a hunger strike. Wright used uneaten food to create models of her fellow prisoners, using sugar cubes as bases, rather than let it go to waste. She and over 60 other prisoners embroidered their signature on The Suffragette Handkerchief under the noses of the prison guards. Wright also used smuggled plasteline to model a portrait bust of her fellow prisoner, Pankhurst. Wright continued her suffrage activism after her return to the United States in 1914. She was Recording Secretary of the Woman's Suffrage Party of New York during the winning campaign. Wright only returned to sculpture full-time after the passage of the Nineteenth Amendment. In 1921, she helped to create the League of Women Voters of New York State.

=== Animal welfare ===
Wright was an anti-vivisectionist and advocated the humane treatment of animals. In 1920, Wright returned to Albany and gradually turned away from art to focus on animal rights. Wright was a benefactress to the National Humane Education Society; in 1950, with Wright's help, the NHES established its first animal care facility, called the Peace Plantation Animal Sanctuary. Wright also wrote the organization's 12 Guiding Principles, which is still in use. In 1957, Wright lobbied President Eisenhower against using animals in medical testing and scientific research; in 1958, Congress passed the Humane Slaughter Act.

== Personal life ==
Wright and Edith J. Goode were lifetime companions. Goode was born in Springfield, Ohio, and raised in Washington, D.C. Goode attended Sidwell Friends, at that time a small Quaker School, then attended Smith College (like Wright, graduating in 1904) where the two women met, and together they worked tirelessly for peace and justice. Goode was a member of the Women's International League for Peace and Freedom and co-founder of the National Woman's Party. Goode also served as a president of The Humane Society of the United States.

Wright served as a delegate to the 1948 United Nations assembly in Paris. Around the same time, Wright also served as an organizer for United Nationals Educational, Scientific and Cultural Organization (UNESCO). Wright was a vegetarian.

== Death and legacy ==
Wright died in Albany at the age of 93, on April 8, 1975. Wright and Goode created the Alice Morgan Wright-Edith Goode Fund, an endowed trust that supports animal welfare organizations.

== Selected works ==
- California Hills (1910) [painting]
- Emmeline Pankhurst (1912), Sewall-Belmont House and Museum, Washington, D.C.
- Faun (1915) Smithsonian American Art Museum, Washington, D.C.
- Dancing Figure (1915)
- The Fist (1921), Albany Institute of History and Art, Albany, N.Y.
- The Off-Shore Wind (1921)
- Medea, Albany Institute of History and Art
- The Trojan Women Albany Institute of History and Art
- Mme. Breshkovskya (Russian Revolutionary), Albany Institute of History and Art
- Edith J. Goode, Albany Institute of History and Art
