= Senator Ballard =

Senator Ballard may refer to:

- Beau Ballard (born 1994), Nebraska State Senate
- Charles Ballard (politician) (1836–1891), Connecticut State Senate
- David W. Ballard (1824–1883), Oregon State Senate
- Deanna Ballard (born 1978), North Carolina State Senate
- Don Ballard (1927–2019), Georgia State Senate
