= Governor Lounsbury =

Governor Lounsbury may refer to:

- George E. Lounsbury (1838–1904), 58th Governor of Connecticut
- Phineas C. Lounsbury (1841–1925), 53rd Governor of Connecticut
