= Schuyler Merritt =

American politician (1853–1953)

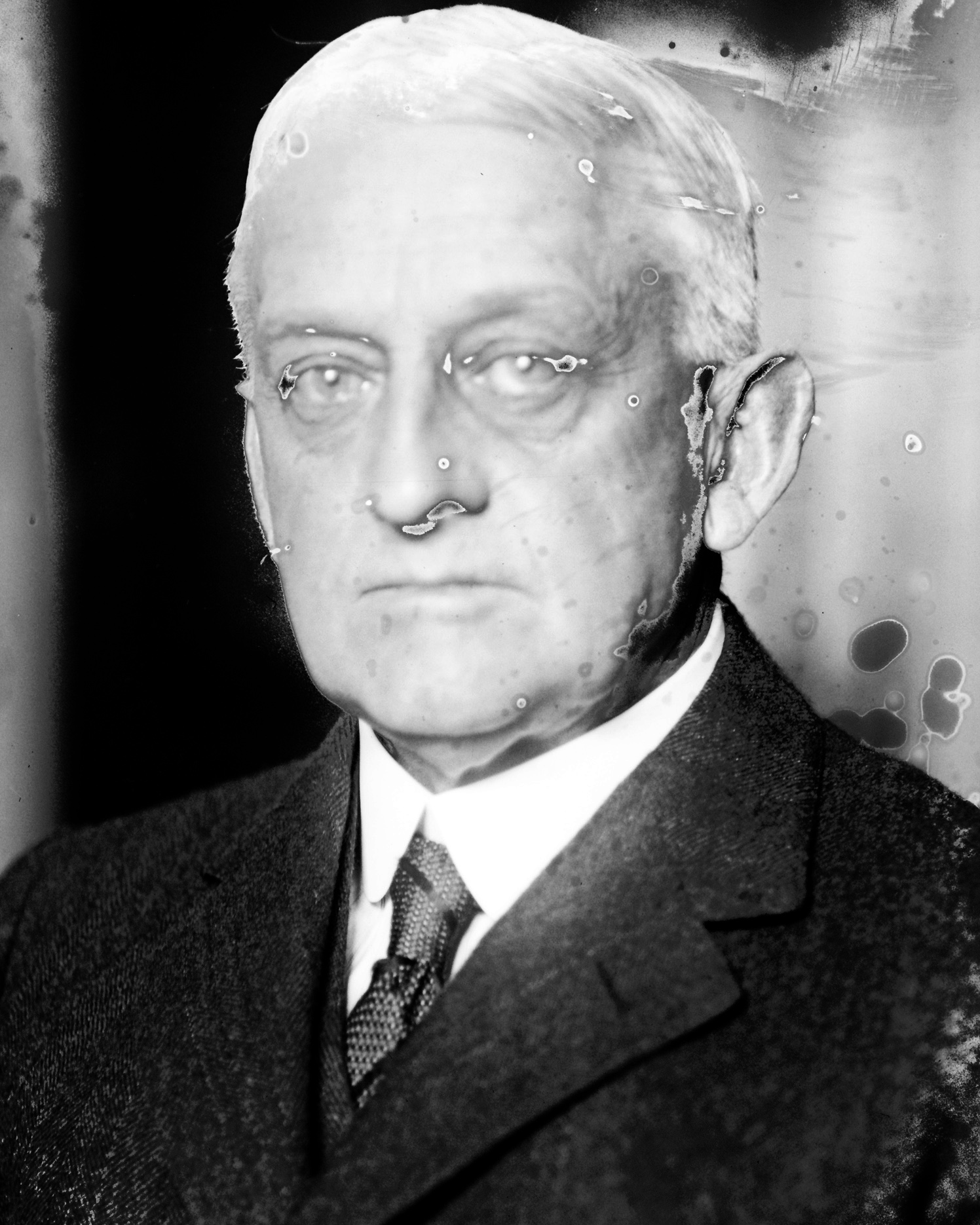
- Merritt, 1921–1922

Member of the U.S. House of Representatives from Connecticut's 4th district
- In office March 4, 1933 – January 3, 1937
- Preceded by: William L. Tierney
- Succeeded by: Alfred N. Phillips
- In office November 6, 1917 – March 3, 1931
- Preceded by: Ebenezer J. Hill
- Succeeded by: William L. Tierney

Personal details
- Born: December 16, 1853 New York City
- Died: April 1, 1953 (aged 99) Stamford, Connecticut
- Resting place: Woodland Cemetery
- Party: Republican
- Spouse: Frances Hannah Hoyt (m. 1879; died 1943)
- Children: 2, including Katharine
- Parent(s): Matthew F. Merritt; Mariah Shaw
- Education: Yale College (1873); Columbia Law School (1876)
- Occupation: Banker

Schuyler Merritt (December 16, 1853 – April 1, 1953) was a Republican member of the United States House of Representatives from Connecticut's 4th congressional district from 1917 to 1931 and 1933 to 1937. He is the namesake of the Merritt Parkway.

== Early life ==
He was born in New York City, in 1853, the son of Matthew Franklin Merritt (1815–1896), a Connecticut State Senator, and Mariah Shaw Merritt. His father had also served in the Connecticut General Assembly. He moved with his parents to Stamford, Connecticut, in 1855. His maternal grandmother, Clarissa Hoyt, was descended from the original Hoyts who purchased Noroton Hill more than 300 years before.

Schuyler prepared for college at private schools in that city and graduated from Yale College in 1873 and from Columbia Law School in 1876.

== Career ==
In 1877, after graduation from Columbia Law, he joined Yale & Towne Manufacturing Company in the manufacture of locks and keys as an office assistant. He eventually rose to be secretary in 1878, general manager in 1890 and treasurer in 1898. He was also involved in banking from 1877 until 1917.

=== Political career ===
In 1904, Merritt was member of the Connecticut constitutional convention that rewrote Connecticut's Constitution. From 1910 until 1916, he was a member of the Connecticut State Board of Education, and later, a delegate to the 1916 Republican National Convention.

He was elected as a Republican to the Sixty-fifth Congress to fill the vacancy caused by the death of Ebenezer J. Hill. Merritt was reelected to the Sixty-sixth and to the five succeeding Congresses and served from November 6, 1917, to March 3, 1931. He was an unsuccessful candidate for reelection in 1930, but was again elected to the Seventy-third and Seventy-fourth Congresses, serving from March 4, 1933, until January 3, 1937. During his time in the House, he served alongside Rep. Matthew Merritt, of New York, who shared a last name, causing some papers to misreport their votes on certain bills. In 1936, Merritt again ran for reelection to the Seventy-fifth Congress, but was not elected, losing to Alfred N. Phillips.

While in Congress, he served on the Interstate Commerce Committee and was known for his opposition to the Eighteenth Amendment, prohibiting liquors, and his opposition to the New Deal program for stock market controls.

=== Later career ===
After leaving Congress, he returned to the Yale & Towne Manufacturing Company, where he was chairman of the board from 1924 until 1932, and retired as a director in 1947. He was an officer of the First Stamford National Bank, since 1902, served as board chairman. He was also a vice president of the Stamford Gas and Electric Company.

Merritt was recognized in 1951 and 1952 as the oldest living Yale graduate and the sole survivor of the class of 1873. In 1935, Yale conferred the honorary degree of Doctor of Laws on him.

== Personal life ==
On October 21, 1879, Merritt married Frances Hannah Hoyt (1850–1943), the daughter of Stamford multimillionaire Joseph Blachley Hoyt (1812–1889) and Catherine Krom (1816–1862), and the niece of Oliver Hoyt (1823–1887), a Connecticut State Senator. Together, they were the parents of:

- Louise Hoyt Merritt (1880–1956), who married William B. Dalton, and was a friend of Adelaide Crapsey
- Katharine Krom Merritt (1886–1986), a pediatrician and co-founder of Family and Children's Service.

Merritt was a mentor to his niece, Joyce Porter Arneill, who would go on to found the National Federation of Republican Women in 1938 and become an RNC delegate for the 1940 presidential election. Arneill was credited with getting many American women involved in politics in the 1930s and 1940s

Merritt died in Stamford on April 1, 1953, at the age of 99. He was buried in Woodland Cemetery.

=== Honors ===
The Merritt Parkway, finished on September 2, 1940, in southern Connecticut was named in his honor and his daughter Louise cut the ribbon.

U.S. House of Representatives
Preceded by Ebenezer J. Hill	Member of the U.S. House of Representatives from Connecticut's 4th congressional district 1917–1931	Succeeded by William L. Tierney
Preceded by William L. Tierney	Member of the U.S. House of Representatives from Connecticut's 4th congressional district 1933–1937	Succeeded by Alfred N. Phillips
Honorary titles
Preceded by Charles Manly Stedman	Oldest member of the U.S. House of Representatives; 1930–1931	Succeeded by Clement C. Dickinson
Preceded by Clement C. Dickinson	Oldest member of the U.S. House of Representatives; 1935–1937	Succeeded by Walter M. Pierce
