= James Henry Hoyt =

American politician

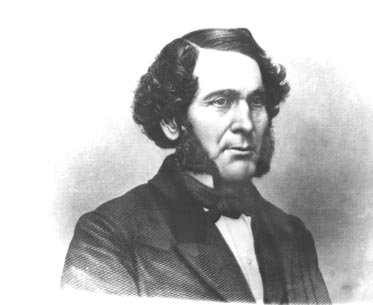

Member of the Connecticut Senate from the 12th District
- In office 1857–1858
- Preceded by: Orris S. Ferry
- Succeeded by: Julius Curtis

Personal details
- Born: April 14, 1809 Stamford
- Died: December 14, 1873 (aged 64) Connecticut
- Party: Democratic
- Spouse: Sarah J. Grey (m. January 31, 1838)
- Occupation: timber merchant, railroad entrepreneur

James Henry Hoyt (April 14, 1809 – December 14, 1873) was an American railroad entrepreneur and member of the Connecticut Senate representing Connecticut's 12th District from 1857 to 1858.

== Early life and family ==
He was born in Stamford, Connecticut on April 14, 1809, the son of William Hoyt and Sarah Wood.

At an early age he was an apprentice to a cabinet maker. He later went into business with his brothers in dry goods and groceries. When he became an adult, he took on the business of his former master, and expanded it into the lumber trade.

Beginning in 1831, he, along with his brothers, leased access to the canal extending from the harbor in Stamford into the center of the village. They engaged in shipping and importing for the five-year duration of the lease. After the lease was expired, he returned to the lumber business.

On January 31, 1838, he married Sarah J. Grey of Darien.

When the railroad was planned to be built through the area, he became a contractor for grading, building bridges, and providing railroad ties. He was very successful, and became heavily associated with various aspects of the railroad industry, and in 1854 was named as superintendent of the railroad.

Connecticut State Senate
| Preceded by Orris S. Ferry | Member of the Connecticut Senate from the 12th District; 1857–1858 | Succeeded by Julius Curtis |
