= Barbara Reimers =

American politician (1919–2010)

Member of the Connecticut Senate from the 12th district
- In office 1977–1979
- Preceded by: Stanley H. Page
- Succeeded by: Regina R. Smith

Personal details
- Born: Barbara Drisler; March 20, 1919 Brooklyn, New York, U.S.
- Died: November 13, 2010 (aged 91)
- Party: Republican
- Spouse: Frederick Reimers
- Children: 3
- Education: Vassar College; La Salle Extension University (LLB)

Barbara Reimers (March 20, 1919 – November 13, 2010) was an American politician who served in the Connecticut State Senate from 1977 to 1979, representing the 12th district as a Republican.

== Personal life and education ==
Reimers was born Barbara Drisler on March 20, 1919, in Brooklyn, New York. She attended Vassar College, as well as LaSalle Extension University, where she earned her LLB. She was married to Frederick Reimers, and they had three daughters together.

Reimers died on November 13, 2010. She was 91.

== Political career ==
Reimers was elected to the Connecticut State Senate in 1976, and she served one term representing the 12th district as a Republican. She ran for reelection in 1978, but was defeated by Democratic candidate Regina R. Smith.
