= Connecticut's 12th State Senate district =

American legislative district

Senator
Christine Cohen; D–Guilford

Connecticut's 12th State Senate district elects one member of the Connecticut State Senate. The district consists of the towns of Branford, North Branford, Durham, Guilford, Killingworth, and Madison. Its current senator is Christine Cohen.

The district boundaries established after the 2010 census are the same as those established after the 2000 census.

== List of senators ==
=== 1830 to 1900 ===
Senator	Party	Years of service	Hometown	Notes
Charles Hawley	Whig	1830–1831	Stamford	
Thaddeus Betts	Whig	1831–1832	Norwalk	
Charles Hawley	Whig	1832–1836	Stamford	
Benjamin Isaacs		1836–1837	Norwalk	
Charles Hawley	Whig	1837–1838	Stamford	
Thomas B. Butler	Whig	1838–1840	Norwalk	
Joshua Ferris	Whig	1840–1842	Stamford	
Clark Bissell	Whig	1842–1844	Norwalk	
Darius Mead		1844–1846	Greenwich	
Charles Marvin	Whig	1846–1848	Wilton	
Thomas B. Butler	Whig	1848–1849	Norwalk	Served as Senate President Pro Tempore
Joshua Ferris	Whig	1849–1851	Stamford	Served as Senate President Pro Tempore
Charles Marvin	Whig	1851–1852	Wilton	
Thomas B. Butler	Whig	1852–1854	Norwalk	
William T. Minor	Republican	1854–1855	Stamford	
Orris S. Ferry	Republican	1855–1857	Norwalk	
James H. Hoyt	Democratic	1857–1858	Stamford	
Julius Curtis	Republican	1858–1859	Stamford	
Matthew F. Merritt		1859–1860	Stamford	
Julius Curtis	Republican	1860–1861	Stamford	
Aaron Homer Byington	Republican	1861–1863	Norwalk	
Morgan Morgans	Whig	1863–1865	Stamford	
Charles Ballard		1865–1867	Darien	
William C. Street		1867–1869	Norwalk	
Huested W. R. Hoyt	Republican	1869–1870	Greenwich	
Elbert A. Woodward	Democratic	1870–1871	South Norwalk	Fled the country in 1871 due to charges stemming from the Tammany Hall corruption scandal
Asa Woodward		1871–1873	Norwalk	
Huested W. R. Hoyt	Republican	1873–1874	Greenwich	
Galen A. Carter	Democratic	1874–1875	Stamford	
Frederick Bruggerhof	Democratic	1875–1877	Darien	
Oliver Hoyt	Republican	1877–1882	Stamford	Served as Senate President Pro Tempore
Edwin L. Scofield	Republican	1883–1884	Stamford	
R. Jay Walsh	Republican	1885–1888	Greenwich	Served as Senate President Pro Tempore
Benjamin P. Mead	Republican	1889–1892	New Canaan	
Leander P. Jones	Republican	1893–1894	Greenwich	
George E. Lounsbury	Republican	1895–1896	Ridgefield	
Edwin O. Keeler	Republican	1897–1900	Norwalk	Served as Senate President Pro Tempore

=== 1900 to present ===
At this point, redistricting caused Fairfield County to be represented in the Senate by the 25th and 26th district.

List of representatives 1900 to present
Senators	Party	Years	District home	Note
Michael Kenealy	Republican	1901–1903	Stamford	
James F. Walsh	Republican	1903–1905	Greenwich	
Alfred E. Hammer	Republican	1905–1907	Branford	
Samuel Hodgkinson	Republican	1907–1909	Wallingford	
Frank L. Stiles	Republican	1909–1911	North Haven	
Arthur W. Marsden	Republican	1911–1913	Madison	
Edwin R. Kelsey	Republican	1913–1915	Branford	
Dwight W. Tuttle	Republican	1915–1917	East Haven	
Frederick H. Rolf	Republican	1917–1919	Guilford	
Arthur W. Marsden	Republican	1919–1921	Madison	
J. W. Sanford Jr.	Republican	1921–1923	Hamden	
R. Earle Beers	Republican	1923–1925	North Branford	
John E. Brainard	Republican	1925–1927	Branford	
Henry F. Hall	Republican	1927–1929	Hamden	
Harry R. Durant	Republican	1929–1931	Guilford	
Waldo S. Blakeslee	Republican	1931–1933	North Haven	
Walter H. Goodrich	Republican	1933–1935	East Haven	
David R. Robbins	Republican	1935–1937	Wallingford	
William C. White	Republican	1937–1939	Guilford	
Roy C. Enquist	Republican	1939–1943	Branford	
Raymond Brock	Republican	1943–1947	New Haven	
Herbert S. MacDonald	Republican	1947–1949	North Haven	
William Jaspers	Republican	1949–1953	East Haven	
Philander Cooke	Republican	1953–1957	Wallingford	
John H. Filer	Republican	1957–1959	Hamden	
Russell I. Boyce	Democratic	1959–1961	Wallingford	
Lucy Hammer	Republican	1961–1973	Branford	
Stanley H. Page	Republican	1973–1977	Guilford	
Barbara Reimers	Republican	1977–1979	Branford	
Regina R. Smith	Democratic	1979–1985	Northford	
Richard S. Eaton Sr.	Republican	1985–1987	Guilford	
Thomas J. Sullivan Jr.	Democratic	1987–1991	Guilford	
William Aniskovich	Republican	1991–2005	Branford	
Edward Meyer	Democratic	2005–2015	Guilford	
Edward M. Kennedy Jr.	Democratic	2015–2019	Branford	
Christine Cohen	Democratic	2019–present	Guilford	

== See also ==
- History of Norwalk, Connecticut
- List of mayors of Norwalk, Connecticut
- List of members of the Connecticut General Assembly from Norwalk
