= William Aniskovich =

American politician (born 1963)

Member of the Connecticut State Senate from the 12th district
- In office January 9, 1991 – January 5, 2005
- Preceded by: Thomas Sullivan
- Succeeded by: J. Edward Meyer

Personal details
- Born: April 8, 1963 (age 63) New Haven, Connecticut
- Party: Republican
- Spouse: Jennifer
- Children: 2
- Education: Catholic University (BA); University of Virginia (JD, MA)

William Aniskovich (born April 8, 1963) is an American politician who served in the Connecticut Senate from the 12th district from 1991 to 2005. He ran unopposed in 1996.
