= Orris S. Ferry =

American politician (1823–1875)

Orris Sanford Ferry
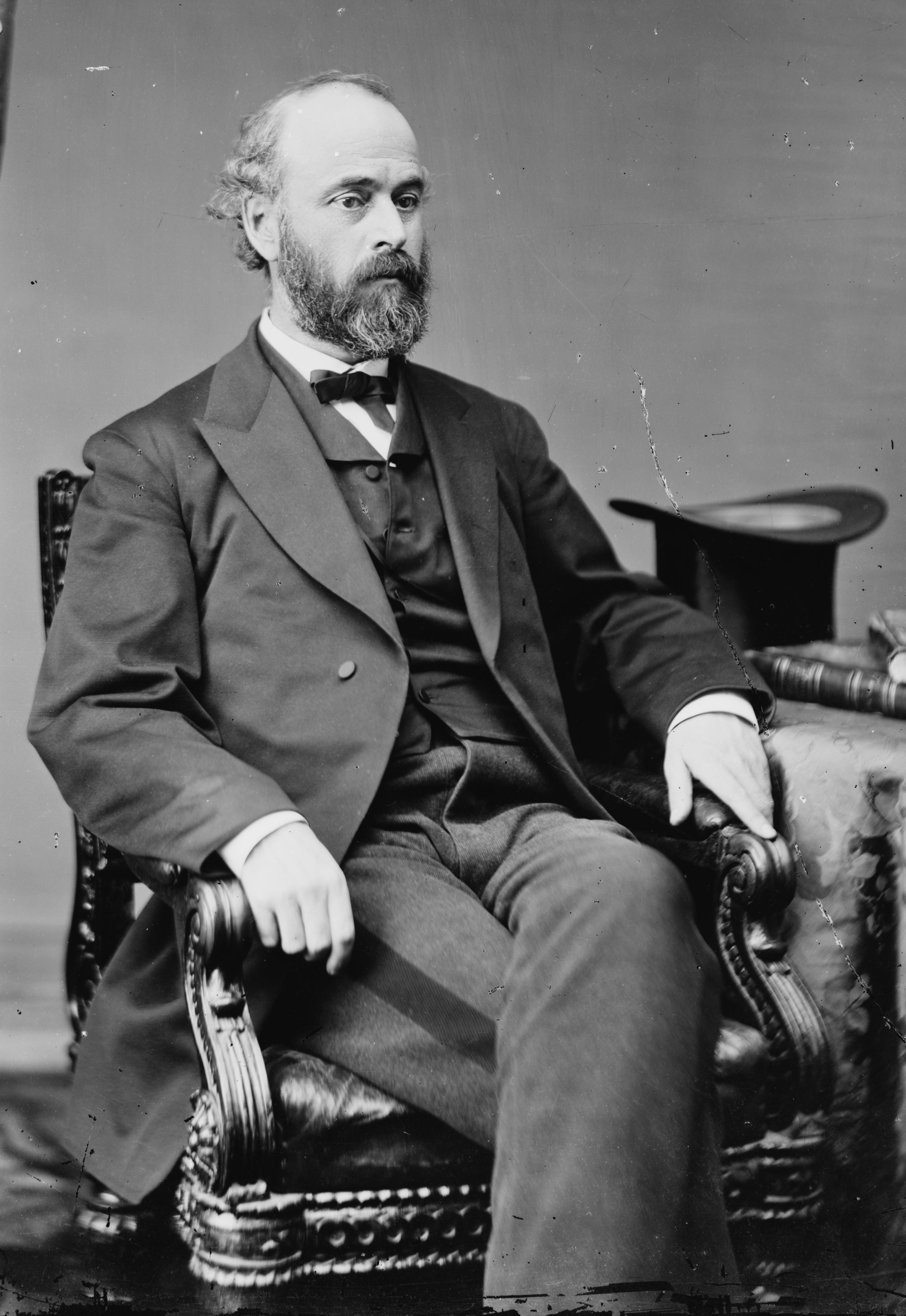
- In office March 4, 1867 – November 21, 1875
- Preceded by: Lafayette S. Foster
- Succeeded by: James E. English

Member of the U.S. House of Representatives from Connecticut's 4th district
- In office March 4, 1859 – March 3, 1861
- Preceded by: William D. Bishop
- Succeeded by: George C. Woodruff

Member of the Connecticut Senate from the 12th district
- In office 1855–1857
- Preceded by: William T. Minor
- Succeeded by: James H. Hoyt

Personal details
- Born: August 15, 1823 Bethel, Connecticut
- Died: November 21, 1875 (aged 52) Norwalk, Connecticut
- Resting place: Union Cemetery; Norwalk, Connecticut
- Party: Republican, Liberal Republican
- Spouse: Charlotte Bissell
- Education: Yale College
- Profession: Politician, Lawyer, Judge

Military service
- Branch/service: United States Army; Union Army
- Rank: Brigadier General; Bvt. Major General
- Unit: 5th Connecticut Infantry Regiment
- Battles/wars: American Civil War

Orris Sanford Ferry (August 15, 1823 – November 21, 1875) was a Republican American lawyer and politician from Connecticut who served in the United States House of Representatives and the United States Senate. He was also a brigadier general in the Union Army during the American Civil War.

== Early life ==
Ferry was born on August 15, 1823, in Bethel, Connecticut. He attended the Hopkins School, and worked at his father's shoe factory as a boy. It was here that he realized his love of books. At age 17, Ferry entered Yale, where he served as one of the editors of the Yale Literary Magazine and was a member of Skull and Bones. He graduated in 1844. Ferry first settled in Fairfield, Connecticut, where he studied law under Thomas B. Osborne. He then settled in Norwalk, Connecticut, and served in the office of Thomas B. Butler. Ferry married Charlotte Bissell, the daughter of Governor Clark Bissell. He was admitted to the bar in 1846. The following year, he was commissioned a lieutenant colonel in the 12th Regiment of Connecticut Militia. During his time in the militia, Ferry did not fight in any battle or war.

== Early political career ==
Ferry served as a probate judge soon after being admitted to the bar. At age 32, he was elected to a term in the Connecticut Senate representing the 12th District. He then served as the State's Attorney for Fairfield County from 1856 to 1859. Ferry was a member of the Toleration Party, but in 1856 became a Republican. After joining the party, he campaigned for John C. Frémont. In 1857, Ferry was nominated to serve in the United States House of Representatives, but lost the election. In 1859, he was again nominated, and this time he won.

== House of Representatives ==
During his time in Congress, Ferry was known for extemporaneous speaking. He gave numerous speeches against slavery. Ferry was chosen as Connecticut's representative to the Committee of Thirty-Three. This Committee was created in the hopes that peace could be settled between the Northern and Southern states. However, Southern states continued to secede from the Union, and the committee was disbanded. Ferry also served on the Committee of Revolutionary Claims. In 1861, he was renominated for his seat, but lost the election.

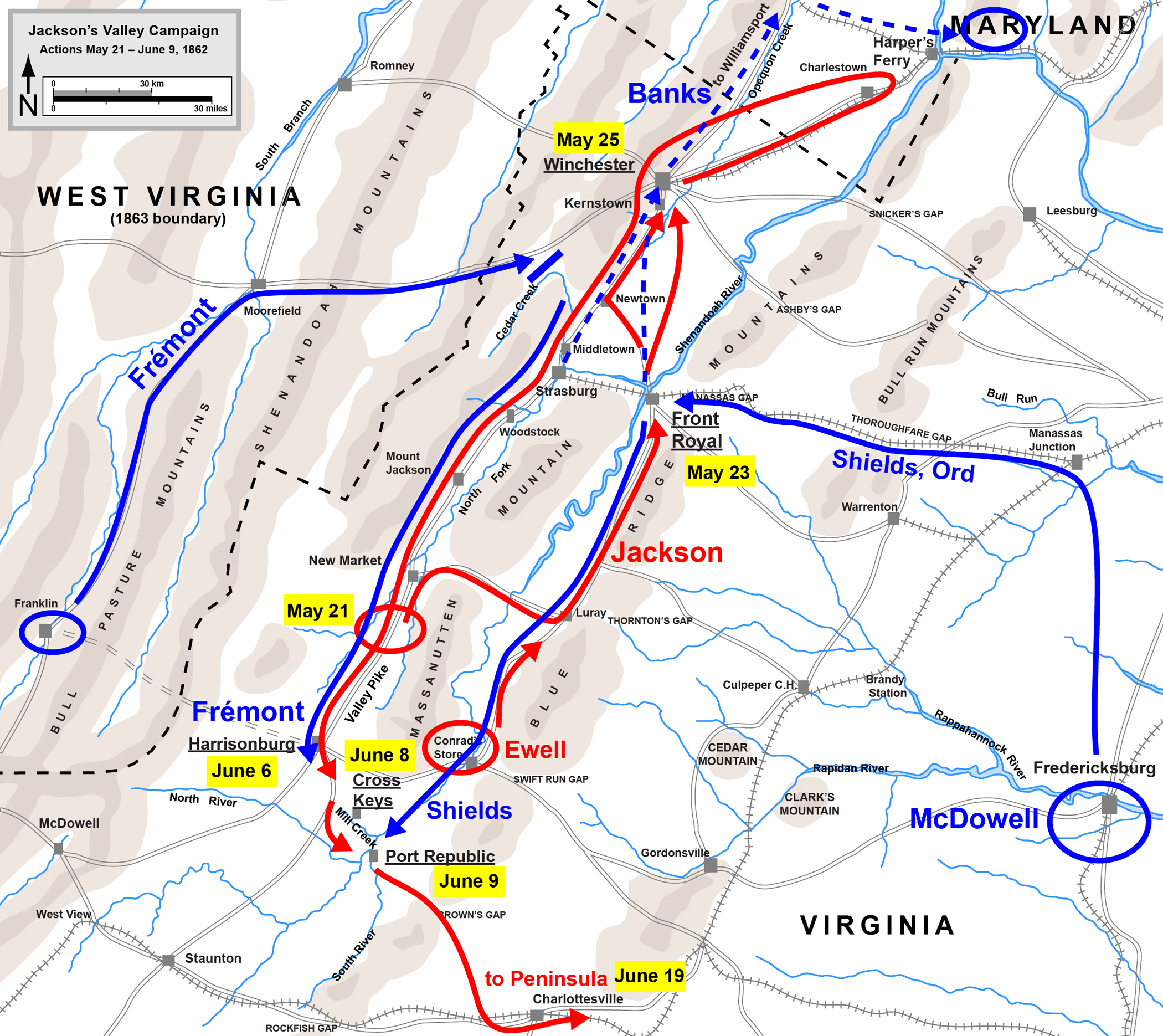
Battle of Winchester, 1862 Ferry served in McDowell's Division Confederate Union

== American Civil War ==
At the outbreak of the American Civil War, and before regiments of Northern troops had arrived to defend Washington, there was a report of a plot to burn the capital. On April 18, 1861, this report mobilized loyal citizens, including Ferry, and state senator A. Homer Byington, also of Norwalk, to form a militia. This militia was led by Cassius Marcellus Clay, and came to be known as the Cassius Clay Guard.

On July 23, 1861, he was put in command of the 5th Connecticut Volunteer Infantry, and given the rank of colonel. The original regiment was the 1st Regiment Colts Revolving Rifles of Connecticut and was supposed to be led by Samuel Colt, but the unit never took the field. Its organization failing, the regiment was reorganized in May 1861. In early March 1862, Ferry led his troops across the Potomac River, and attacked the Confederates at Winchester, Virginia. This action would later lead to what became the First Battle of Winchester. Ferry was well praised for his ability as a leader and as a military strategist. Ferry was promoted to brigadier general on March 17, 1862. He was then put under the command of General James Shields, whose division joined that of Gen. Irvin McDowell. It was under McDowell that Ferry fought at the First Battle of Winchester. Ferry continued to serve under Shields, during the Valley Campaign.

=== Battle of Cedar Mountain ===
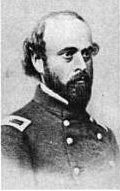
Orris Ferry during the American Civil War

Shortly after the First Battle of Winchester, Ferry and the 5th Connecticut Infantry were put under the command of Maj. Gen. Nathaniel Banks. On August 9, Ferry, under Banks, encountered Stonewall Jackson at the Battle of Cedar Mountain. The Union troops attacked to gain early advantage, but a Confederate counterattack repulsed Banks's corps and won the day. Later that day, Union reinforcements under Maj. Gen. John Pope arrived. This led to a two-day stand-off between the two armies. The battle ended in a Confederate victory.

=== Services and resignation ===
During the war, Ferry served in the VII Corps, X Corps, and XVIII Corps. He was also the head of the District of Lehigh, from August 20, 1863, until May 1864, and served as the head of the District of Philadelphia from December 16, 1864, until July 15, 1865. Ferry was brevetted a major general of volunteers in recognition of his services during the Peninsula Campaign. He resigned from the military on July 15, 1865. His resignation followed the Confederate surrender.

== Senate career ==
After the Civil War, Ferry returned to both his political career and law practice. In 1866, he ran against Lafayette S. Foster, the incumbent of the Class III Connecticut Senate seat. Ferry won the election, and took his place in the U.S. Senate on March 4, 1867. He became very active in committees, and favored amnesty for members of the Confederacy. Ferry participated in the Impeachment of President Andrew Johnson, voting to convict. In 1869, Ferry was attacked by a rare disease of his spine. This disease led to a slow deterioration of his spine. This slowed his workings in the Senate, but he continued to play an active role. From 1870 to 1871, he served as the chairman of the Committee to Audit and Control the Contingent Expenses. From 1871 to 1875, he was chairman of the Committee on Patents. Ferry also served on the United States Senate Committee on Health, Education, Labor, and Pensions. Ferry was considered a Liberal Republican, but he declined to officially associate with the breakaway party. In 1872, Ferry was reelected for a second term. His main supporters were Democrats and Liberal Republicans.

=== Alexander Caldwell scandal ===
In 1871, Alexander Caldwell was elected to the Senate from Kansas. From the start, allegations of corruption and pay-offs emerged. In 1873, Congressman Sidney Clarke, who assisted in Caldwell's election, testified that Caldwell's campaign had claimed that it would pay $250,000 to secure the election. Kansas Governor Thomas Carney testified that he was paid $15,000 to drop out of the race. An investigation followed; its final report asked the Senate to expel Caldwell for not being "duly and legally elected". On March 21, 1873, Ferry took to the floor of the Senate and gave a speech asking the Senate to expel Caldwell: "The crime of bribery goes down to the very foundations of the institutions under which we live. We all know it and ... we shall stifle our consciences if we do not vote to expel." After a survey of the Senate, Caldwell saw his inevitability of being expelled, and resigned, on March 23.

I see around me the life-long friends and neighbors of Senator Ferry, now no more; a man whom I cherished as a dear companion and associate, and to whom I looked up as one of the foremost men of the republic, in talent, integrity and patriotic spirit. More than almost any one I knew did he possess those qualities of mind and character which just at this period of our history are so greatly needed for the guidance of public affairs ... Had his body been as strong as his mind and heart, he would beyond doubt have compelled universal recognition as one of the very first of statesmen in American history.

— Senator Carl Schurz, from his speech during Ferry's funeral, 1875

=== Later Senate career ===
In 1874, Ferry gave a speech against the future Civil Rights Act of 1875. After speaking, Senator Charles Sumner, both a friend of Ferry's and the proposer of the bill, stood up and said, "Mr. Ferry, your speech is far the most damaging blow my measure has yet received". The Civil Rights Act would eventually pass, but was deemed unconstitutional by the Supreme Court, on the basis that Congress did not have the power to regulate the conduct of individuals. His last speech in Congress was considered an uncommonly eloquent dissertation on his former friend, William Alfred Buckingham.

== Death ==
After his final speech, Ferry left the capital for a new medical treatment. The treatment was to help heal his decaying spine, but the procedure failed. On November 20, 1875, Ferry's friends and doctors helped take him home. He died of his spine disease the next day. His funeral was attended by dignitaries such as Schurz. Ferry was interred at Union Cemetery in Norwalk.

== See also ==
- List of American Civil War generals (Union)
- List of United States representatives from Connecticut
- List of United States senators from Connecticut
- List of members of the United States Congress who died in office (1790–1899)

== Sources ==
- Croffut, William Augustus, Morris, John Moses; The military and civil history of Connecticut during the war of 1861-65: comprising a detailed account of the various regiments and batteries, through march, encampment, bivouac, and battle; also instances of distinguished personal gallantry, and biographical sketches of many heroic soldiers..., Ledyard Bill, 1869
- Eicher, John H., Eicher, David J.; Civil War High Commands, Stanford University Press, 2001, ISBN 978-0-8047-3641-1
- Grossman, Mark; Political corruption in America: an encyclopedia of scandals, power, and greed, ABC-CLIO, 2003 ISBN 978-1-57607-060-4
- History of Battle-Flag Day, September 17, 1879, Lockwood & Merritt, 1879
- Hutchins, Edward Ridgeway; The War of the Sixties, The Neale Publishing Co., 1912
- McDonald, William N., A History of the Laurel Brigade, 1907.
- Obituary of Orris S. Ferry
- United States Congress. "Orris S. Ferry (id: F000094)". Biographical Directory of the United States Congress. Retrieved on 2008-02-12
- Orris S. Ferry Obituary in the New York Times, November 22 1875
- Salmon, John S., The Official Virginia Civil War Battlefield Guide, Stackpole Books, 2001, ISBN 978-0-8117-2868-3.
- Warner, Ezra J.; Generals in Blue: Lives of the Union Commanders, LSU Press, 1964, ISBN 978-0-8071-0822-2
- Williams, H. Clay; Biographical encyclopaedia of Connecticut and Rhode Island of the nineteenth century, Metropolitan Pub. and Engraving Co., 1881

U.S. House of Representatives
Preceded by William D. Bishop	Member of the U.S. House of Representatives from Connecticut's 4th congressional district March 4, 1859 – March 3, 1861	Succeeded by George C. Woodruff
U.S. Senate
Preceded by Lafayette S. Foster	U.S. senator (Class 3) from Connecticut; March 4, 1867 – November 21, 1875	Succeeded by James E. English
Connecticut State Senate
Preceded by William T. Minor	Member of the Connecticut Senate from Connecticut's 12th Senate district 1855–1856	Succeeded by James H. Hoyt
