= Galen A. Carter =

American politician

Galen Augustus Carter

Member of the Connecticut Senate from the 12th District
- In office 1874–1875
- Preceded by: Huested W. R. Hoyt
- Succeeded by: Frederick Bruggerhof

Personal details
- Born: June 22, 1832 New York City, US
- Died: November 10, 1893 (aged 61) Stamford, Connecticut, US
- Resting place: Woodland Cemetery, Stamford, Connecticut
- Party: Democratic
- Spouse: Mary Caroline Davenport (m. November 1853)
- Children: 4
- Education: New York Medical School (Columbia College) (1850)
- Occupation: broker, merchant

Galen Augustus Carter (June 22, 1832 – November 10, 1893) was a member of the Connecticut Senate representing the 12th district from 1874 to 1875.

He was born June 22, 1832, in New York City, the son of Galen Carter and Ann Eliza Ketchum.

He was a partner in the firm of Jacob Little & Company, member of the New York Stock Exchange.

In November 1853, he married Mary C. Davenport

He was elected a burgess of the Borough of Stamford.

In 1874, he was elected to the Connecticut Senate.

Connecticut State Senate
Preceded by Huested W. R. Hoyt	Member of the Connecticut Senate from the 12th District; 1874–1875	Succeeded by Frederick Bruggerhof
