= Julius Curtis =

American politician

Julius Bolivar Curtis
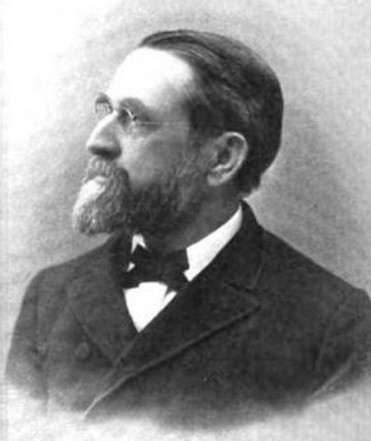

Member of the Connecticut Senate from the 12th District
- In office 1858–1859
- Preceded by: James H. Hoyt
- Succeeded by: Matthew F. Merritt
- In office 1860–1861
- Preceded by: Matthew F. Merritt
- Succeeded by: A. Homer Byington

Personal details
- Born: December 10, 1825 Newtown, Connecticut, U.S.
- Died: June 10, 1907 (aged 81) Stamford, Connecticut, U.S.
- Resting place: Woodland Cemetery, Stamford, Connecticut, U.S.(418-29)
- Party: Free Soil Party; American Party; Republican
- Spouse(s): Mary A. Acker (m. 1860), Alice Kneeland Grain (m. May 11, 1886)
- Children: Sarah L. Curtis Mackey, Louis Julius Curtis
- Education: Newtown Academy, New York State and National Law School
- Occupation: lawyer, judge
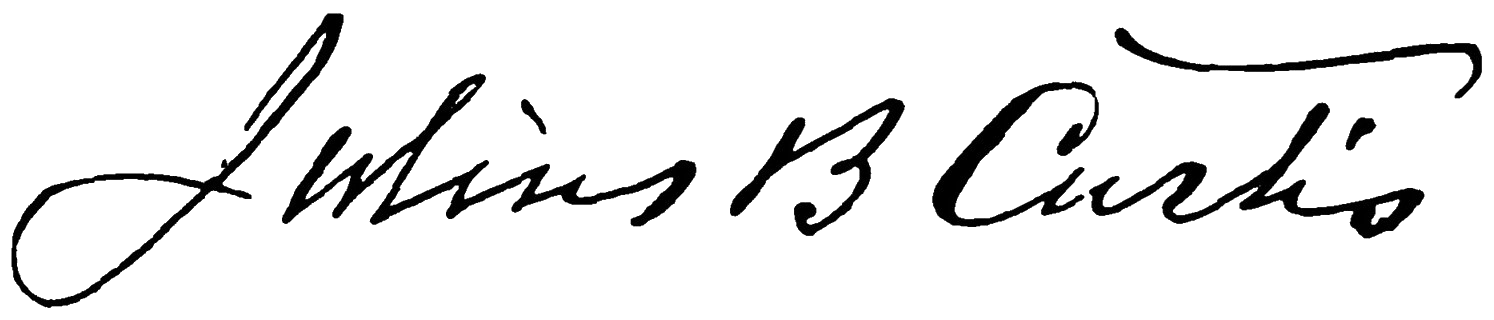
- Signature

Julius Bolivar Curtis (December 10, 1825 – June 10, 1907) was a lawyer and judge in Fairfield County, Connecticut, practicing for over fifty years. He was a member of the Connecticut Senate representing the 12th District from 1858 to 1859 and from 1860 to 1861.

He was born in Newtown, Connecticut on December 10, 1825, the son of Nichols and Ann Bennitt Curtis. He attended Newtown Academy, and the New York State and National Law School at Ballston Spa, New York. He was admitted to the bar on December 27, 1850. He began practicing law in Greenwich in 1851.

He was elected a Burgess of the Borough of Greenwich from 1855 to 1865, and served as Borough Attorney during the same period. During the American Civil War, he served on the Military Committee of the town of Greenwich.

He moved to Stamford in 1864. He was elected Judge of the Probate Court in 1867 for the district of Stamford, holding the post through 1870. He was judge of the Borough Court of Stamford from 1887 to 1893.

He was elected to the Connecticut Senate from Stamford. In this capacity, he was an ex officio member of the Corporation of Yale College.

Curtis had been a Republican since the organization of the party in Connecticut. However, he had previously sympathized with the Free Soil Party and the American Party.

He was a member of the General Council of the American Bar Association beginning in 1889, and from 1885 to 1889 served as one of its vice-presidents. He served as a director of the Stamford Street Railroad Company beginning in 1887.

Curtis married his first wife, Mary Acker on October 30, 1854. She died on February 23, 1884. They had two children: Louis J. Curtis and Sarah L. Mackey. His second wife was Alice Kneeland Grain. They married on May 11, 1886.

From 1896 to 1905, he was president of the Fairfield Bar Association.

He died in Stamford on June 10, 1907, of "old age."

Connecticut State Senate
Preceded by James H. Hoyt	Member of the Connecticut Senate from the 12th District; 1858–1859	Succeeded by Matthew F. Merritt
Preceded by Matthew F. Merritt	Member of the Connecticut Senate from the 12th District; 1860–1861	Succeeded by A. Homer Byington
