= John Henry Hubbard =

American politician (1804–1872)

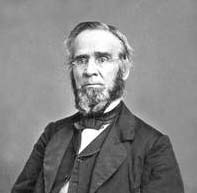

Member of the United States House of Representatives from Connecticut's 4th congressional district
- In office March 4, 1863 – March 3, 1867
- Preceded by: George C. Woodruff
- Succeeded by: William Henry Barnum

Member of the Connecticut Senate
- In office 1847–1849

Personal details
- Born: March 24, 1804 Salisbury, Connecticut
- Died: July 30, 1872 (aged 68) Litchfield, Connecticut
- Resting place: East Cemetery
- Party: Republican
- Occupation: lawyer

John Henry Hubbard (March 24, 1804 in Salisbury, Connecticut – July 30, 1872 in Litchfield, Connecticut) was a Republican member of the United States House of Representatives from Connecticut's 4th congressional district from 1863 to 1867. He also served as a member of the Connecticut Senate from 1847 to 1849.

== Early life ==
He was born in Salisbury, Connecticut and attended the public schools. He studied law. He was admitted to the bar in 1828 and commenced practice in Lakeville.

He served as a member of the State Senate 1847–1849.

He served as prosecuting attorney 1849–1852. He moved to Litchfield in 1855 and continued the practice of law.

Hubbard was elected to the Thirty-eighth and Thirty-ninth Congresses (March 4, 1863 – March 3, 1867). He was an unsuccessful candidate for renomination in 1866. He resumed the practice of law.

He died in Litchfield, Connecticut, on July 30, 1872. He was interred in the East Cemetery.

U.S. House of Representatives
Preceded by George C. Woodruff	Member of the U.S. House of Representatives from Connecticut's 4th congressional district 1863 – 1867	Succeeded by William Henry Barnum
Connecticut State Senate
Preceded by.	Member of the Connecticut Senate; 1847-1849	Succeeded by.
