= Lucy Hammer =

American politician (died 2001)

Member of the Connecticut Senate from the 12th district
- In office 1961–1973
- Preceded by: Russell I. Boyce
- Succeeded by: Stanley H. Page

Member of the Connecticut House of Representatives from Branford
- In office 1955–1961 Serving with Howard V. Young (1955–1959); Edward A. Petela (1959–1961)
- Preceded by: Alice T. Peterson; Raymond F. Barnes
- Succeeded by: Arline W. Ryan; Irving C. Jacocks

Personal details
- Born: Lucy Bradford Taylor; 1904 or 1905
- Died: January 9, 2001 (aged 96)
- Party: Republican
- Spouse: Thorvald Hammer (m. 1927; died 1987)
- Children: 1
- Education: Smith College

Lucy Hammer (1904 or 1905 – January 9, 2001) was an American politician from Connecticut. A Republican, Hammer represented the town of Branford in the Connecticut House of Representatives from 1955 to 1961. She served in the Connecticut State Senate from 1961 to 1973, representing the 12th district.

== Personal life ==
Lucy Bradford Taylor was born in 1904 or 1905. She graduated from Smith College in 1926 and married Thorvald Frederick Hammer on February 19, 1927, at the Washington National Cathedral in Washington, D.C. They had a daughter together. Thorvald died in 1987.

== Political career ==
Hammer was first elected to the Connecticut House of Representatives in 1954, and she served three terms representing the town of Branford as a Republican. She served her first two terms alongside fellow Republican Howard V. Young, and the second alongside Democrat Edward A. Petela. Hammer did not run for reelection in 1960, instead running to represent the 12th district of the Connecticut State Senate. She was elected and served five terms. She did not run for reelection in 1972.

== Death and legacy ==
Hammer died on January 9, 2001, at age 96.

The James Blackstone Memorial Library in Branford, Connecticut, dedicated a meeting room to Hammer.
