= Benjamin P. Mead =

American politician

Benjamin Penfield Mead
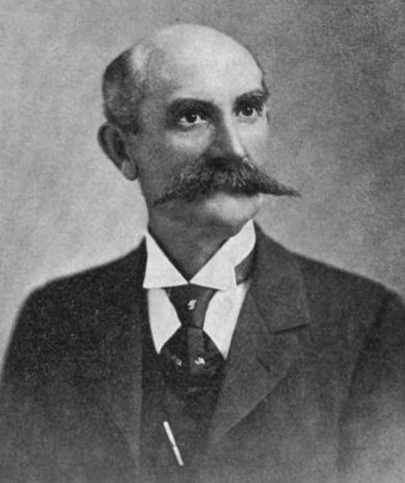

Connecticut State Comptroller
- In office 1895–1899
- Governor: Daniel H. Hastings
- Preceded by: Nicholas Staub
- Succeeded by: Thompson S. Grant

Member of the Connecticut Senate from the 12th District
- In office 1889–1892
- Preceded by: R. Jay Walsh
- Succeeded by: Leander P. Jones

Member of the Connecticut House of Representatives from New Canaan
- In office 1885–1889

Personal details
- Born: September 21, 1849 Bridgeport, Connecticut, U.S.
- Died: March 19, 1913 (aged 63) New Canaan, Connecticut, U.S.
- Party: Republican
- Spouse: Florence Heath
- Children: Benjamin Mead, Harold Mead, Florence Mead
- Education: Greenwich Academy
- Occupation: grocer, real estate
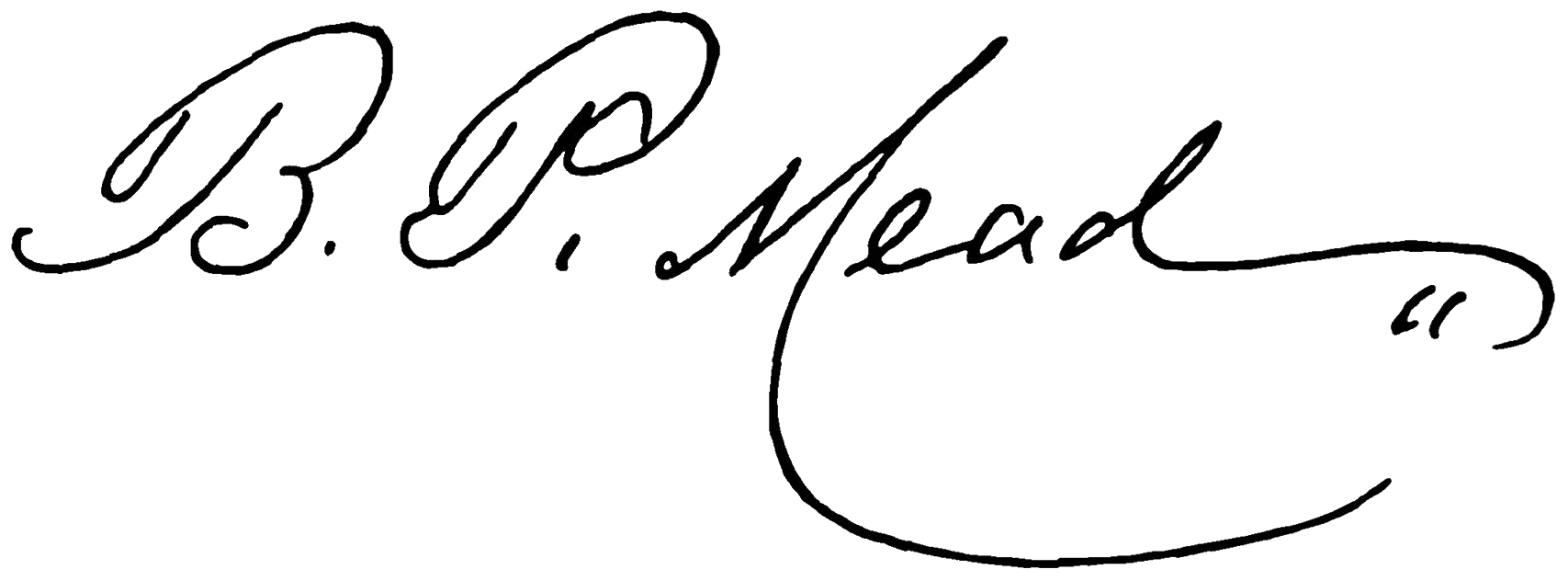
- Signature

Benjamin Penfield Mead (September 21, 1849 – March 19, 1913) was Connecticut State Comptroller from 1895 to 1899, a member of the Connecticut House of Representatives representing New Canaan from 1885 to 1889, and a member of the Connecticut Senate representing the 12th District from 1889 to 1892.

He was the son of Benjamin Close Mead and Mary Elizabeth Rich of Greenwich.

In 1902, he was a delegate to the Connecticut Constitutional Convention. He died in 1913 after an illness.

Preceded by Nicholas Staub	Connecticut State Comptroller; 1895–1899	Succeeded by Thompson S. Grant
Connecticut State Senate
Preceded by R. Jay Walsh	Member of the Connecticut Senate from the 12th District; 1889–1892	Succeeded by Leander P. Jones
Connecticut House of Representatives
Preceded by	Member of the Connecticut House of Representatives from New Canaan; 1885–1889	Succeeded by
