= Matthew F. Merritt =

Connecticut politician

Matthew Franklin Merritt

Member of the Connecticut Senate from the 12th District
- In office 1859–1860
- Preceded by: Julius Curtis
- Succeeded by: Julius Curtis

Personal details
- Born: March 2, 1815 Flushing, Queens, New York, U.S.
- Died: May 10, 1896 (aged 81) Stamford, Connecticut, U.S.
- Resting place: Woodland Cemetery, Stamford, Connecticut
- Spouse: Mariah Shaw
- Children: 4, including Schuyler
- Occupation: Ship chief

Matthew Franklin Merritt (March 2, 1815 – May 10, 1896) was a member of the Connecticut Senate representing the 12th District from 1859 to 1860.

== Early life ==
He was born on March 2, 1815, in Flushing, Queens. He was the son of Nehemiah M. Merritt and Phebe (née Thorne) Merritt. His father was a dry goods merchant on Pearl Street in New York City.

== Career ==
Merritt was a member of the Connecticut Senate from the Connecticut's 12th Senate District.

== Personal life ==
Merritt was married to Mariah Shaw (1820–1901), the daughter of William Shaw and Clarissa (née Hoyt) Shaw. Together, they were the parents of:

- Amelia Merritt (1839–1915), who married William Frederick Skelding (1833–1885).
- Julia Merritt (1841–1908).
- Adeline Gay Merritt (1846–1869).
- Schuyler Merritt (1853–1953), who also served in the Connecticut General Assembly from Stamford and, later, the U.S. House of Representatives.

Merritt died on May 10, 1896, in Stamford, Connecticut. He was buried.

Connecticut State Senate
| Preceded by Julius Curtis | Member of the Connecticut Senate from the 12th District; 1859–1860 | Succeeded by Julius Curtis |
