= Oliver Dennett Grover =

American painter

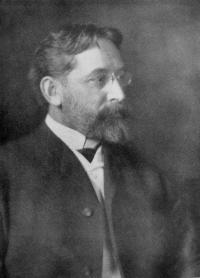
Oliver Dennett Grover

Oliver Dennett Grover (1861 Earlville, Illinois – 1927 Chicago), was an American landscape and mural painter, the son of lawyer Alonzo Jackson Grover.

== Early life ==
Grover's family moved to Chicago early in his life. There he spent much of his time sketching at the Academy of Design. Showing great promise he was enrolled at Munich’s Royal Academy in 1879, where he studied under Frank Duveneck. At the age of 19 he exhibited at Munich’s International Exposition. Grover followed Duveneck to Venice and Florence, and then went on to study in Paris from 1883 to 1885 under Gustave Boulanger, Jean-Paul Laurens and Lefebvre.

== Later years ==
He returned to Chicago in 1885 and was appointed as an instructor at the Art Institute of Chicago for five years, also opening a studio and founding the Western Art Association. Between 1887 and 1892 he served on the faculty of the Chicago Art Academy. Ada Walter Shulz was among his pupils.

The First Yerkes Prize was awarded to Grover in 1892 for his painting "Thy Will Be Done" showing a woman devastated by news she had just received, and which was exhibited at the World’s Columbian Exposition. Grover's reputation as a traditional painter and art authority was by this time firmly established in Chicago. He painted the "Harem Scene" in 1899, his contribution to the Orientalist genre. He exhibited three Venetian sketches at the St. Louis Universal Exposition, also showing at the Pennsylvania Academy and the National Academy of Design. He painted murals for the James Blackstone Memorial Library in the mid 1890s and for the Blackstone Memorial Library in Chicago in 1903, his lunettes there representing Art, Literature, Science and Labor. His "Ponte Vecchio", "Florence" and "Rocky Shore: Lake Garda" were displayed at the Panama–Pacific International Exposition.

Grover became an Associate of the National Academy of Design in 1913. During the last years of his life, he also became a board member of the Association of Arts and Industries which was a major influence in Chicago design in the 1920s and 1930s. Grover concentrated on portraits, landscapes and decorative designs, often making trips to Europe. Travelling to the Pacific Northwest he produced a number of landscape paintings of Banff.

== Gallery ==
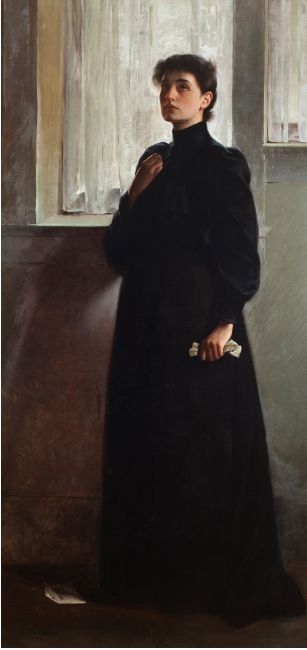
Thy Will Be Done (1892)

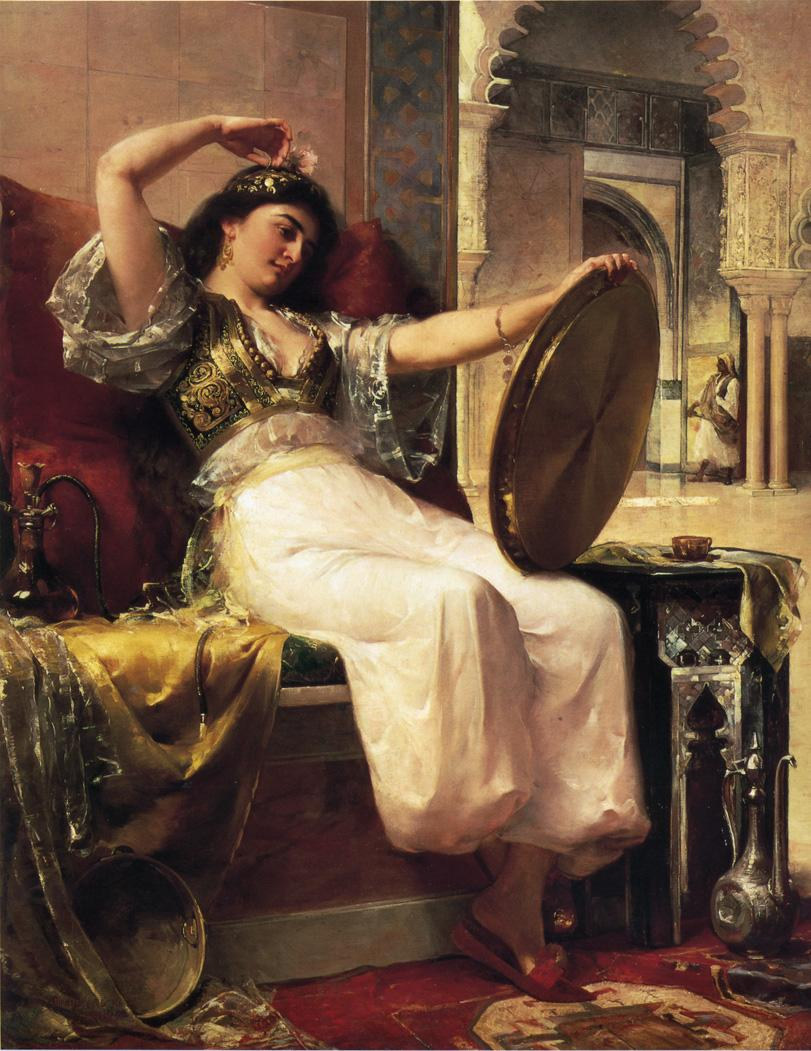
Harem Scene (1899)
