= J. Edward Meyer =

American politician

Member of the Connecticut State Senate from the 12th district
- In office January 6, 2005 – January 7, 2015
- Preceded by: William Aniskovich
- Succeeded by: Edward M. Kennedy Jr.
- Constituency: represents Branford, Durham, Guilford, Killingworth, Madison, and North Branford

Member of the Board of Regents of the State University of New York
- In office March 8, 1977 – March 31, 2000
- Preceded by: William Jovanovich
- Succeeded by: Harry Phillips III

Member of the New York State Assembly from the 92nd district
- In office January 1, 1971 – December 31, 1974
- Preceded by: Richard A. Cerosky
- Succeeded by: Peter M. Sullivan

Personal details
- Born: April 15, 1935 (age 91) New York, New York
- Party: Democrat (since 1973) Republican (until 1973)
- Spouse: Patty Ann Meyer (Reese)
- Children: Daniel, Lisa, Jeffrey, Tory, Timothy, Andrew
- Education: Yale University (BA, JD)

J. Edward Meyer III (born April 15, 1935) is an American politician. Meyer, a Democrat, is a former member of the Connecticut State Senate, representing the 12th District from 2005 to 2015. Meyer was also a member of the New York State Assembly, serving as a Republican from 1971 to 1973 and a Democrat from 1973 to 1975.

== Early life and career ==
J. Edward Meyer III was born on April 15, 1935, in New York City, the son of J. Edward Meyer Jr. and Carolyn S. Meyer. He graduated from Yale University and Yale Law School.

In 1964, Meyer was appointed by then U.S. Attorney General Robert F. Kennedy to a position in the Justice Department, where he mainly focused on organized crime prosecutions. Meyer was a member of the New York State Assembly from 1971 to 1975, sitting in the 179th and 180th New York State Legislatures. While initially elected as a Republican, Meyer changed parties in 1973, serving out his term as a Democrat. In 1976, Meyer won the Democratic nomination for New York's 23rd congressional district, however, he was defeated in the general election by Bruce F. Caputo. Meyer also served on the Board of Regents of the University of the State of New York from 1977 to 2000.

== Connecticut State Senator ==
Meyer, a resident of Guilford, represented the eastern suburbs of New Haven along the coast of Long Island Sound, including the towns of Branford, Durham, Guilford, Killingworth, Madison, and North Branford. As a state senator, he had been a leading supporter of legalizing assisted suicide.

Meyer's political career in Connecticut began in 2004 when he defeated seven term Republican incumbent William Aniskovich. Aniskovich was hampered by his alleged closeness to former Governor John G. Rowland, who had recently resigned due to a corruption investigation.

In 2006, Meyer defeated political newcomer Greg Hannan 23,600 to 13,127 to be elected to his second term in the Connecticut Senate. Meyer was elected to a third term in 2008 after defeating attorney and Iraq War veteran Ryan Suerth 30,565 to 20,430. In 2010, he defeated Durham Planning and Zoning Commissioner Lisa Davenport 21,311 to 19,567. In 2012, Meyer was re-elected to a fifth term, defeating Guilford Selectwoman Cindy Cartier 25,888 to 22,736.

In March 2014, Meyer announced that he would not be running for re-election.

== See also ==
- Connecticut Senate

New York State Assembly
Preceded by Richard A. Cerosky	Member of the New York State Assembly from the 92nd district 1971–1974	Succeeded by Peter M. Sullivan
Connecticut State Senate
Preceded by William Aniskovich	Member of the Connecticut State Senate from the 12th district 2005–2015	Succeeded by Edward M. Kennedy Jr.
