= George Catlin Woodruff =

American politician (1805–1885)

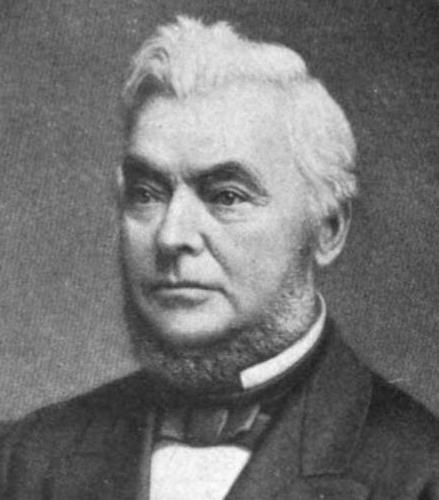

Member of the United States House of Representatives from Connecticut's 4th congressional district
- In office March 4, 1861 – March 3, 1863
- Preceded by: Orris S. Ferry
- Succeeded by: John Henry Hubbard

Member of the Connecticut House of Representatives
- In office 1851–
- In office 1866–
- In office 1874–

Personal details
- Born: December 1, 1805 Litchfield, Connecticut
- Died: November 21, 1885 (aged 79) Litchfield, Connecticut
- Resting place: East Cemetery
- Party: Democratic
- Spouse: Henrietta Sophronia Seymour Woodruff
- Education: Morris Academy; Yale College (1825)

George Catlin Woodruff (December 1, 1805 – November 21, 1885) was a Democratic member of the United States House of Representatives from Connecticut's 4th congressional district from 1861 to 1863. He also served as member of the Connecticut House of Representatives in 1851, 1866, and 1874. He served terms as court clerk, justice of the peace, grand juror, probate judge, postmaster, town treasurer, town clerk, president and director of a bank, and colonel in the militia.

== Early life ==
Woodruff was born in Litchfield, Connecticut. He was the son of Major General Morris Woodruff and Candace Catlin. Woodruff was graduated from Yale College in 1825. He studied law at the Litchfield Law School. He was admitted to the bar in 1827 and began practice in Litchfield.

== Public service ==
He was Postmaster of Litchfield from January 4, 1832, to January 27, 1842, and from September 2, 1842, to September 28, 1846. He served as member of the Connecticut House of Representatives in 1851, 1866, and 1874. Woodruff was elected to the Thirty-seventh Congress (March 4, 1861 – March 3, 1863). He was an unsuccessful candidate for reelection in 1862 to the Thirty-eighth Congress. He continued the practice of law until his death in Litchfield, Connecticut, November 21, 1885. He was interred in East Cemetery.

U.S. House of Representatives
| Preceded by Orris S. Ferry | Member of the U.S. House of Representatives from Connecticut's 4th congressional district 1861 – 1863 | Succeeded by John Henry Hubbard |
