= Regina R. Smith =

American politician (1937–2005)

Member of the Connecticut Senate from the 12th district
- In office 1979–1985
- Preceded by: Barbara Reimers
- Succeeded by: Richard S. Eaton

Personal details
- Born: April 2, 1937 Bridgeport, Connecticut, U.S.
- Died: April 12, 2005 (aged 68) Madison, Connecticut, U.S.
- Party: Democratic
- Spouse: Richard J. Smith Jr.
- Children: 7
- Education: Albertus Magnus College

Regina R. Smith (April 2, 1937 – April 12, 2005) was an American politician who served in the Connecticut State Senate from 1979 to 1985, representing the 12th district as a Democrat.

== Personal life and education ==
Smith was born in Bridgeport, Connecticut, on April 2, 1937. She graduated from Albertus Magnus College, and she was married to Richard J. Smith Jr. Together, they had seven children.

Smith died on April 12, 2005, in Madison, Connecticut. She was 68.

== Political career ==
In 1972, Smith ran to represent the 86th district in the Connecticut House of Representatives, but was defeated by Republican candidate Hoyte G. Brown Jr.

In 1978, Smith was elected to the Connecticut State Senate, and she served three terms representing the 12th district as a Democrat. She ran for reelection in 1984 but was defeated by Republican candidate Richard S. Eaton.

=== Abortion rights ===
Smith was active in anti-abortion organizations throughout her political career. In 1973, after the landmark Roe V. Wade decision, Smith formed the Pro-Life Council of Connecticut, of which she would serve as executive director. She attended and helped to organize yearly protests of the Roe decision at the Connecticut State Capitol. She was also a member of the board of directors of the National Right to Life Committee in Washington, D.C., and served as vice chairwoman.

In 1983, while serving in the Senate, Smith commented that she was disappointed in a recent U.S. Supreme Court decision, City of Akron v. Akron Center for Reproductive Health, that rendered Connecticut's regulations requiring hospitalization for all abortions performed after the first trimester of pregnancy unconstitutional. In a 1993 interview, Smith said that she hoped the Connecticut legislature would consider mandated pre-abortion counseling, as well as a parental consent or notification bill that would prevent minors from requesting or receiving abortion services without consent from one or both parents. She did not advocate for a total abortion ban and focused instead on legislation she believed to be "politically possible".
