= Leander P. Jones =

American politician

Leander Page Jones
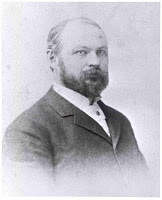

Member of the Connecticut Senate from the 12th District
- In office 1893–1894
- Preceded by: Benjamin P. Mead
- Succeeded by: George E. Lounsbury

Personal details
- Born: 1847 Shaftsbury, Vermont, U.S.
- Died: March 2, 1908 Florida, U.S.
- Party: Republican
- Spouse: Fanny Hotchkiss Jones (m. 1873)
- Children: Milo Hotchkiss Jones, Horace Carter Jones, Philip Leander Jones, Barrett Jones, Rhoda Jones
- Occupation: physician

Leander Page Jones (1847 – March 2, 1908) was a member of the Connecticut Senate representing the 12th District from 1893 to 1894.

He was born in Shaftsbury, Vermont in 1847. He graduated from New York Homeopathic Medical College in 1870. Thereafter, he set up a medical practice in Greenwich, Connecticut.

He was warden of the borough of Greenwich in 1896. Thereafter, he served a health officer of Greenwich until his death. In his capacity as health officer, he formulated a plan to protect communities from infectious diseases which was adopted in the legislature, and served as a model for other states. It was in the campaign to adopt this proposal, that he accepted the nomination for the Connecticut Senate seat for the 12th district.

He was a key figure in the building of Greenwich General Hospital.

== Role in exposing Cleveland's secret surgery ==
See Grover Cleveland#Cancer

Jones played a minor, but perhaps pivotal role in exposing President Grover Cleveland's secret surgery to remedy a cancerous jaw. In 1893, Cleveland had surgery aboard a yacht owned by his friend E. C. Benedict, as it sailed off Long Island. One of the team of doctors, Dr. Hasbrouck, was scheduled to do surgery with Jones in Greenwich, but was delayed by the President's surgery. Hasbrouck told the story to a Dr. McDonald, who relayed the information to Jones. Jones told, fellow Greenwich resident, and newspaper reporter Elisha Jay Edwards about the incident, and a story about it was published in the Philadelphia Press on August 29, 1893.

== Later years ==
His son, Milo, with whom he practiced medicine died in 1903 due to contracting an illness from one of his patients. Leander died after an extended illness, during which he visited with friends first in North Carolina, and then in Florida. He died in Florida in 1908, having fallen and having no one find him until he had died.

== Associations ==
- Connecticut Medical Society

Connecticut State Senate
Preceded by Benjamin P. Mead	Member of the Connecticut Senate from the 12th District; 1893–1896	Succeeded by George E. Lounsbury
