= Morgan Morgans =

American politician

Member of the Connecticut Senate from the 12th District
- In office 1863–1865
- Preceded by: A. Homer Byington
- Succeeded by: Charles Ballard

Member of the Connecticut House of Representatives from Stamford
- In office 1862–1863 Serving with Isaac S. Jones
- Preceded by: Wells R. Ritch, Isaac S. Jones
- Succeeded by: Selleck Scofield, Joseph D. Warren

President of the Board of Aldermen of New York City
- In office 1850–1851
- Preceded by: James Kelly
- Succeeded by: Richard T. Compton

Personal details
- Born: October 23, 1806 New York City
- Died: May 20, 1889 (aged 82) Brooklyn, New York
- Resting place: Woodland Cemetery, Stamford, Connecticut (418-29)
- Party: Whig
- Spouse: Mary A. Wilmore
- Children: Mary Morgans Hoyt, James F. Morgans, Morgan Morgans, Jr., Josiah Morgans, Margaret Morgans

Morgan Morgans (October 23, 1806 – May 20, 1889) was a member of the Connecticut Senate representing the 12th District from 1863 to 1865 and a member of the Connecticut House of Representatives from 1862 to 1863. In 1852, he was the Whig Party candidate for mayor of New York City.

He was born in New York City in East Broadway on October 23, 1806.

He was a profitable brass founder and added to his income by real estate speculation.

Morgans was the leader of the Whig Party in the Seventh Ward of New York.

He was elected assistant alderman in 1849 and represented the ward as alderman from 1850 to 1851. During his term as alderman, he was president of the board of aldermen, and was Acting Mayor during the temporary absence of Ambrose Kingsland.

In 1852, he was nominated by the Whigs as a candidate for mayor of New York City, but lost to Jacob Aaron Westervelt.

He retired from his business in 1857.

In 1859, he moved to Stamford, Connecticut, where he built a residence.

He lived in Connecticut for eight years, and during that time was a member of both the Connecticut House and Connecticut Senate.

Upon leaving Connecticut, he settled in Cutchogue, New York, where he had previously spent his summers.

He remained in Cutchogue until the death of his wife, after which he lived with his son James at 373 Monroe Street in Brooklyn until his death.

Connecticut State Senate
Preceded by A. Homer Byington	Member of the Connecticut Senate from the 12th District; 1863–1865	Succeeded by Charles Ballard
Connecticut House of Representatives
Preceded by Wells R. Ritch; Isaac S. Jones	Member of the Connecticut House of Representatives from Stamford; 1862–1863; With: Isaac S. Jones	Succeeded by Selleck Scofield; Joseph D. Warren
