= William L. Tierney =

American politician

William Laurence Tierney
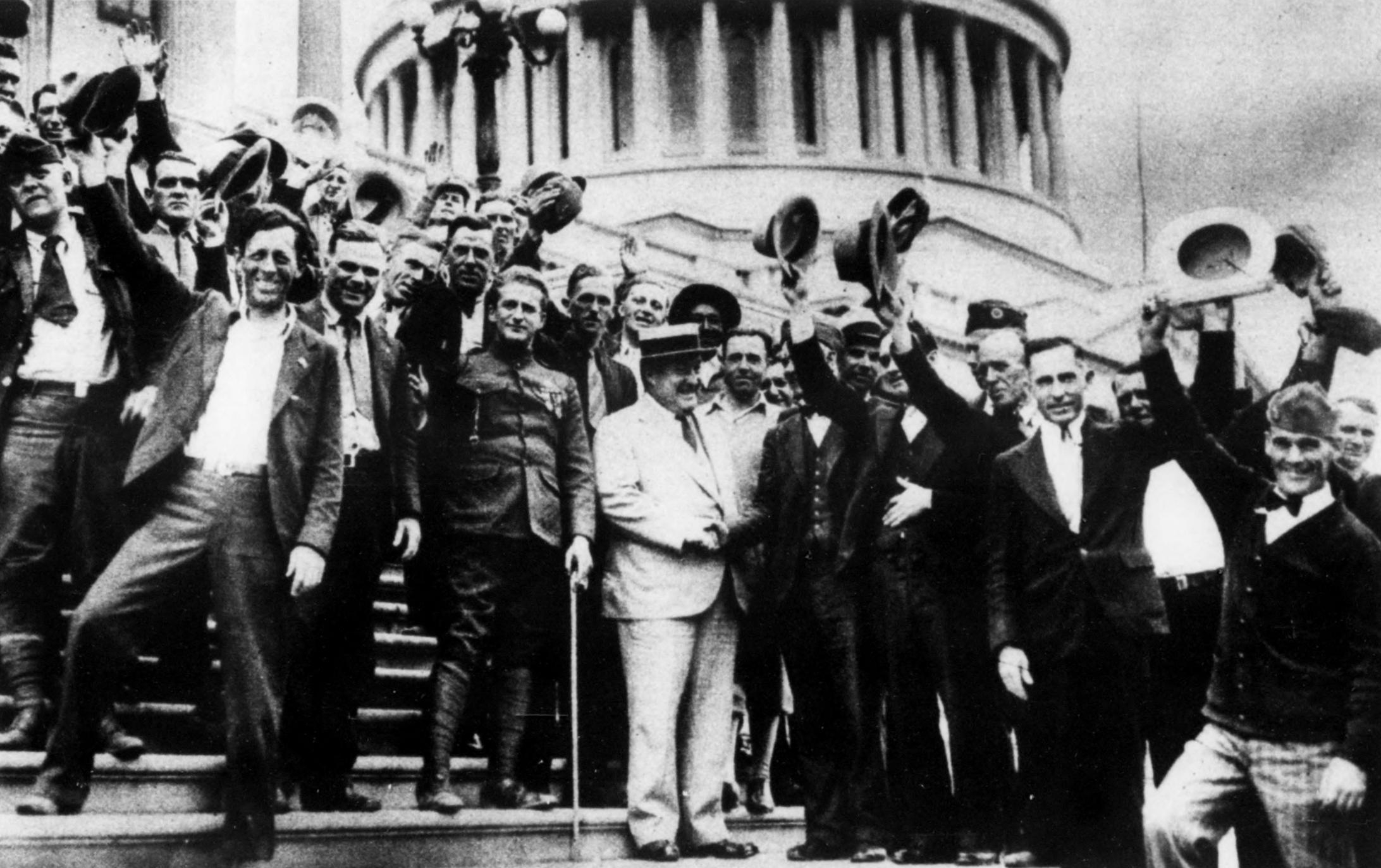
- Tierney (center, white suit) is greeted by members of the Bonus Army, 1932

Member of the U.S. House of Representatives from Connecticut's 4th district
- In office March 4, 1931 – March 3, 1933
- Preceded by: Schuyler Merritt
- Succeeded by: Schuyler Merritt

Personal details
- Born: August 6, 1876 Norwalk, Connecticut
- Died: April 13, 1958 (aged 81) Greenwich, Connecticut
- Resting place: St. Mary's Cemetery
- Party: Democratic
- Education: Fordham University (1898); New York Law School (1900)
- Occupation: lawyer, banker

William Laurence Tierney (August 6, 1876 – April 13, 1958) was a Democratic member of the United States House of Representatives from Connecticut's 4th congressional district from 1931 to 1933.

== Early life ==
Tierney was born in Norwalk, Connecticut, Tierney attended the public schools. He was graduated from Fordham University, New York City, in 1898 and from New York Law School in 1900.

He was admitted to the bar in 1900 and commenced practice in New York City. He moved to Denver, Colorado, in 1905 and to Greenwich, Connecticut in 1912, continuing the practice of law. He served as judge of Greenwich court 1912-1914.

== Political career ==
Tierney served in the Seventy-second Congress from March 4, 1931 to March 3, 1933. He was an unsuccessful candidate for reelection in 1932 to the Seventy-third Congress. He resumed the practice of law in Greenwich, Connecticut, and New York City.

He was State counsel for the Home Owners' Loan Corporation in 1934 and 1935. He engaged in banking and the practice of law in Greenwich, Connecticut, until his death there April 13, 1958. He was interred in St. Mary's Cemetery.

U.S. House of Representatives
Preceded by Schuyler Merritt	Member of the U.S. House of Representatives from Connecticut's 4th congressional district March 4, 1931 – March 3, 1933	Succeeded by Schuyler Merritt
