= James Blackstone Memorial Library =

Coordinates: 41.28005°N 72.81509°W

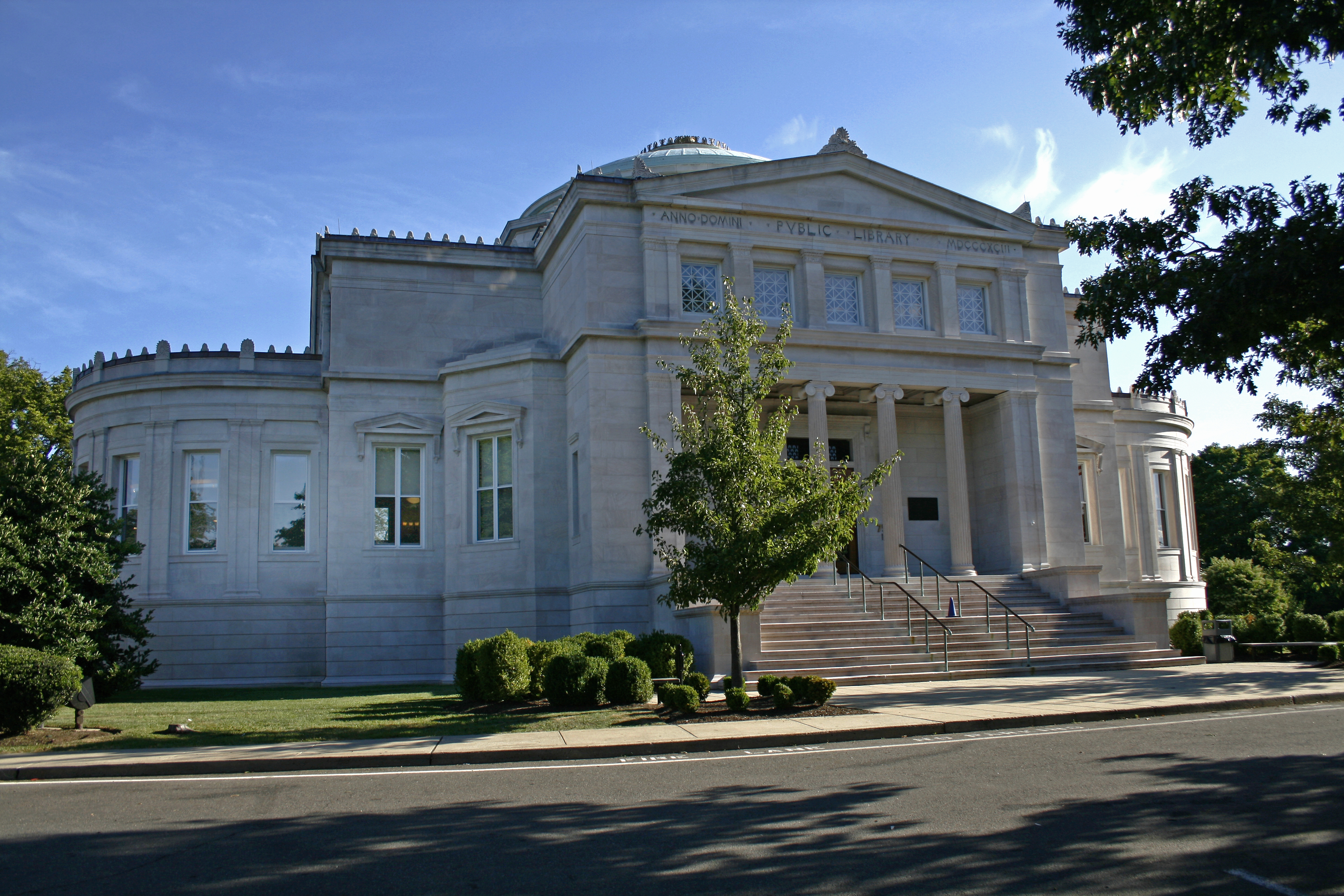

General information
- Location: 758 Main Street; Branford, Connecticut, United States
- Construction started: 1893
- Completed: 1896

Design and construction
- Architect: Solon S. Beman

James Blackstone Memorial Library is a public library located in Branford, Connecticut. It is commonly referred to as the Blackstone Library or the Branford Library. The library was commissioned by Timothy Blackstone as a memorial to his father, James Blackstone. It was designed by Chicago architect Solon Spencer Beman. Construction on the building began in 1893 and was completed in 1896. The building was dedicated on June 17, 1896.

There is also a Blackstone Library in Chicago, which is part of the Chicago Public Library System, and was named after Timothy Blackstone. This library was also designed by Solon Spencer Beman.

== History ==
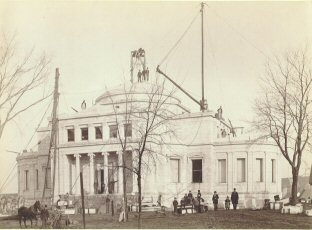
Image of library under construction in 1895-6.

In 1890, the need for a public library in Branford was identified and a committee was formed to solicit funds. The committee reached out to Timothy Blackstone, who was born in Branford but had since moved to Chicago, where he was the president of the Chicago and Alton Railroad. Timothy was the son of James Blackstone, who was born in Branford in 1793 and died there in 1886. The library cost $300,000 to build, contributed by Timothy. He also provided the library with an additional endowment of $300,000.

Timothy directed that his endowment be used to build the library in the name of his father, James Blackstone. James, a Branford native, had been a farmer and a captain in the Connecticut Militia, as well as an honored community leader. The town followed Timothy's directions, but after his death decided to cement a plaque with Timothy's name at the main entrance.

Work on the Blackstone Library began in 1893 under the direction of Solon Spencer Beman, a Chicago architect. He designed the library in the Neoclassical Revival style with details taken from the Erechtheum of the Athenian Acropolis. The exterior of the building, including the dome, is entirely of Tennessee Pink marble. The library took nearly three years to complete, and was dedicated on June 17, 1896.

At the main entrance to the library are two bronze doors, each weighing nearly 2,000 pounds. The doors were designed by William Fitzroy Smith. They feature two lion's paws resting on mother earth and at the top is a small ram's head. An owl symbolizes human wisdom. The center forms a torch which is framed with medallions and cords. Beyond the doors is the rotunda, the central feature of the building. The rotunda is paved with marble mosaic floor tiles that were designed in Paris for the library. At the top of the rotunda is the dome, embellished with large paintings that illustrate the history of book making. The 6' x 9' paintings were done by Oliver Dennett Grover, a Chicago painter. There are also eight medallion portraits of New England authors between the arches in the center of the second floor. The authors are: Harriet Beecher Stowe; James Russell Lowell; Oliver Wendell Holmes; John Greenleaf Whittier; Henry Wadsworth Longfellow; Nathaniel Hawthorne; Ralph Waldo Emerson; William Cullen Bryant.

Library in about the early 1920s

The first librarian was Arthur W. Tyler who held the position from 1896 to 1898. When it opened, the library contained 6,000 books.

== Library services ==
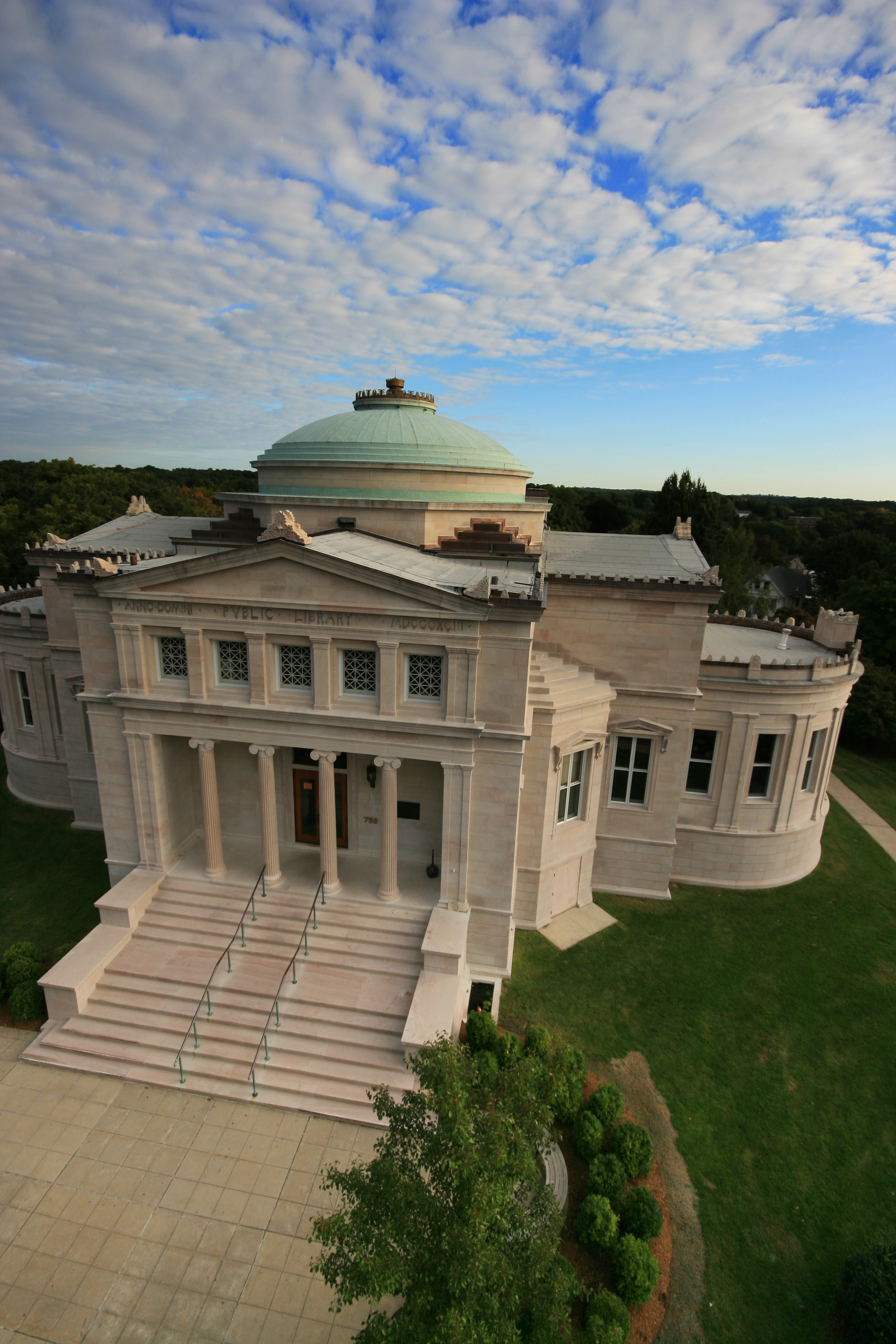
James Blackstone Memorial Library, photo by Alaina Driscoll

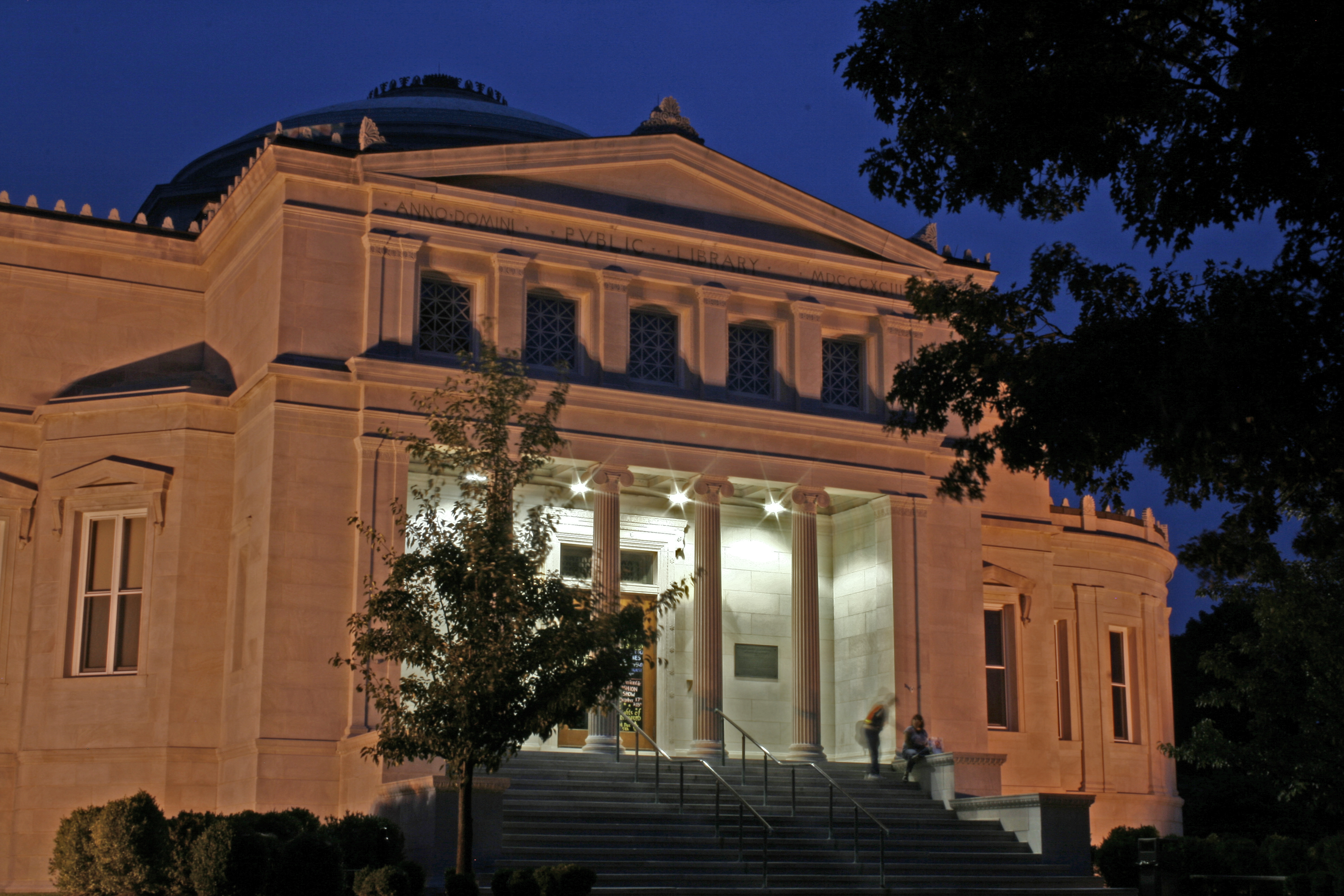
Library at night

As of 2011, the library houses approximately 80,000 volumes (circulating over twice that many annually), and provides access to thousands of eBooks and audiobooks. The library serves a population of more than 29,000 residents. The library is home to a number of public computers to use free of charge, as well as free wireless internet access. It offers many programs and events to the public, including lectures, movies, plays and musical recitals. The Associate Librarian for Reference, Barbara Cangiano, was the 2004 recipient of the New York Times Librarian Award for her outstanding service.

There is a small meeting room, the Lucy Hammer room, as well as an auditorium in the library available for use by the public. Meetings, lectures, movies and weddings are held here. The library also has a Friends group that works to support the library through a variety of fundraising events.

Although the library receives funds from the town of Branford, it is a private entity governed by a board of trustees.
