= Blackstone Library =

Branch of the Chicago Public Library

Coordinates: 41°48′21″N 87°35′25″W

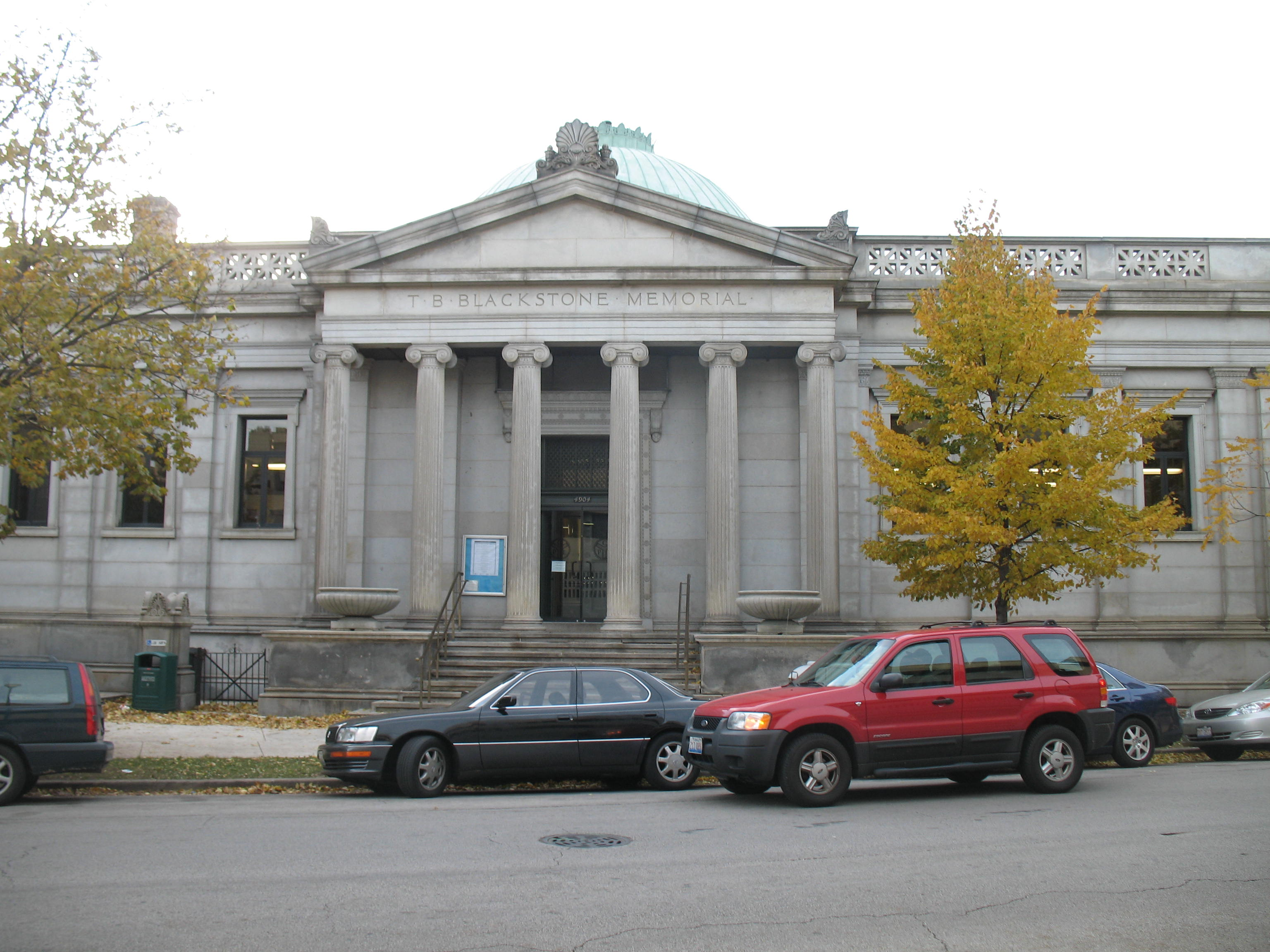
- Front of Blackstone Library
- Interactive map of the Blackstone Library area

General information
- Architectural style: Classical Revival
- Location: 4904 South Lake Park Avenue; Chicago, Illinois, United States
- Named for: Timothy Beach Blackstone
- Year built: 1902–1904, addition in 1938–1939
- Construction started: 1902
- Completed: 1904
- Renovated: 1977–1980, 2004
- Cost: $250,000 (nearly $9 million today)

Technical details
- Material: Granite exterior, mahogany furnishings, bronze doors and lamps, marble mosaics, murals
- Floor area: 13,794 square feet

Design and construction
- Architect: Solon S. Beman
- Designations: Chicago Landmark (December 8, 2010)

T. B. Blackstone Memorial Library is part of the Chicago Public Library (CPL) System and is named for library benefactor Timothy Blackstone. The building was designed by Chicago architect Solon S. Beman. It is now known as the Chicago Public Library – Blackstone Branch and commonly referred to as Blackstone Library, or Blackstone Branch and sometimes Blackstone for short. The Concord Granite building's two-year construction started in 1902, and it was dedicated on January 8, 1904. Blackstone Library marks the beginning of the CPL Branch System as the first dedicated branch. Blackstone is also the only branch of the 79-branch Chicago Public Library branch system that was constructed using private funding (the system also includes a central library and three regional libraries). The Blackstone Library is designated as a Chicago Landmark.

The building is located in Chicago's Kenwood community area in Cook County, Illinois, United States and serves the Hyde Park, Kenwood, and Oakland community areas. The branch celebrated its 100th anniversary of service in 2004. Today, the library has bronze and mahogany furnishings and has themed paintings on the rotunda ceiling. The library is equipped with custom-designed furniture and makes public Wi-Fi access available to its patrons.

== History ==
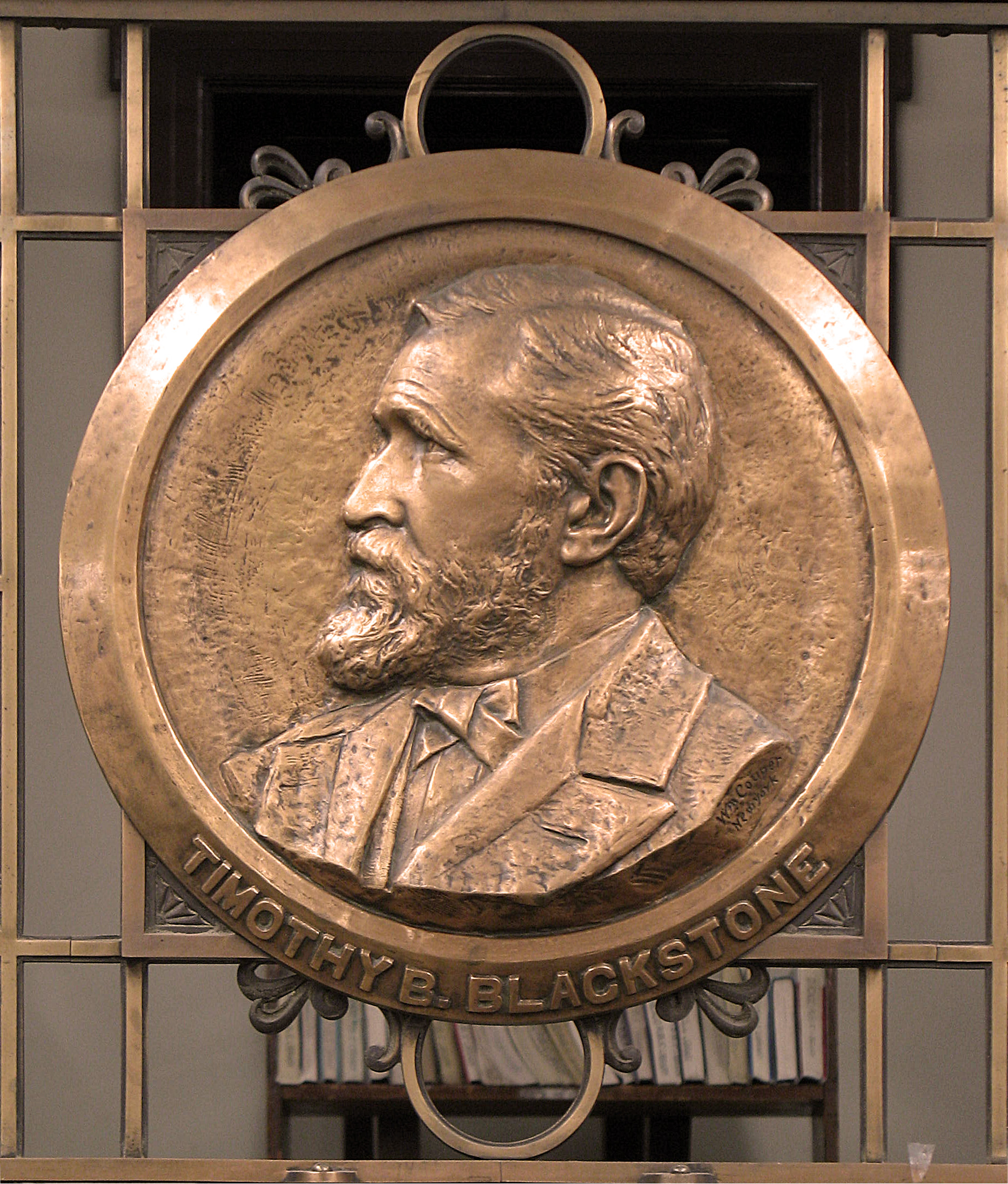
Timothy B. Blackstone Bronze Plaque by William Couper

The library was dedicated to the memory of Timothy Beach Blackstone, President of the Chicago and Alton Railroad from 1864 to 1899, a period longer than any of his contemporaries. Blackstone, who had died on May 26, 1900, was also the founding president of the Union Stock Yards. He had owned the property on which the Blackstone Library now stands, and he donated this tract for the construction of the library after his death. The library was built on the tract through a codicil in his will, carried out by his wife, Isabella Norton Blackstone (1838–1928), after his death. Blackstone Library was his contribution to the city where he had made his fortune and stands as a monument to his generosity. Blackstone is 13,794 sq ft (1,281.5 m^{2}) and its original cost was $250,000 ($9,302,885 today).

Although the Blackstones lived downtown, they maintained numerous close friendships in the affluent Hyde Park and Kenwood neighborhoods. Prior to the donation of the Blackstone Library, the Chicago Public Library System had been renting reading room spaces around the city and had been seeking stand alone branches. On January 8, 1904, Isabella Blackstone handed the keys and deed to the Timothy B. Blackstone Library to the city's Library Board members. Blackstone Library became the first branch library in the Chicago Public Library System. The building retains a Lake Park Avenue address although the neighboring section of Lake Park was moved about a half a block east several decades ago.

At least three renovations have occurred, which have expanded, renovated and updated the library. From 1938 to 1939 the new children's room annex, a Works Progress Administration project, was added at a cost of $68,400 ($1,583,182). During this annexation, one of a set of Howard Van Doren Shaw townhouses was razed. From 1977 to 1980 a major restorative renovation occurred. Blackstone was rededicated on November 18, 1980, in recognition of completion of the three years of work. There was also a 2004 renovation for the centennial.

Blackstone donated a larger James Blackstone Memorial Library (1891, opened 1893), in his father's memory to Branford, Connecticut, Blackstone's birthplace. In addition to the James Blackstone Library in Branford, there is a library named "Blackstone Library" in Blackstone, Massachusetts. The architect for both the Branford and Chicago libraries was Solon S. Beman. The Blackstone Library was designated as a Chicago Landmark by the City of Chicago on December 8, 2010.

== Service ==
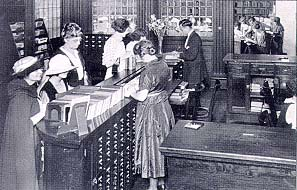
Interior of the library, 1904

As one of the 79 Chicago Public Library branch libraries, Blackstone Library serves the Hyde Park, Kenwood, and Oakland community areas. These communities include 17 elementary schools and 4 high schools. The 2000 census service area population was 50,084.

In 2003, the "Friends of Blackstone Branch Library" was formed, making the Blackstone Branch one of approximately 34 branches to have such a support group. The volunteer support group attempts to "serve as an advisory council for Chicago's first branch library, promote use and improvement of the library, and provide volunteer and fundraising services for Blackstone".

The Blackstone Library participates in most Chicago Public Library programs and partnerships, including Great Kids Museum Passport Program, the Monthly Adult Book Club Discussion as well as many annual events and activities. The branch also partners with neighborhood institutions such as the Hyde Park Art Center and the Smart Museum for programs and workshops. Like all branches, the library provides both free Wi-Fi access and free terminals with both internet access and printing facilities. Blackstone has 5 internet terminals requiring reservations for each session of up to one hour and 1 express terminal that does not require reservations for sessions of up to 15 minutes. Currently, patrons can use the terminals for up to two free internet sessions per day and print for a small charge per page anywhere in the Chicago Public Library system.

== Design ==
The building was designed by the architect Solon S. Beman and modeled after Beman's Merchant Tailors Building, the domed temple facing the lagoon in the 1893 World's Columbian Exposition, and the Erechtheum at the Athenian Acropolis. The library's rotunda murals have thematic titles: "Labor", "Literature", "Art" and "Science".

The following is a summary of the building's features: Tiffany style dome; Marble column and walls in the rotunda and foyer; 4 overhead rotunda murals painted by Oliver Dennett Grover, mural painter for the World Columbian Exposition; 1 in (2.5 cm) square Italian marble mosaic flooring; glass-floored mezzanine; 2,800 pounds (1,300 kg) bronze plate, solid copper core outer front doors; 2 150 pounds (68 kg) lbs. bronze and glass inner doors; 12 inches (30 cm) thick granite walls; and ionic columns.

The building's adult reading room is equipped with mahogany furniture specifically designed for the space. It also contains matching built-in shelving and custom-made bronze lamps. The circulation desk area has two-tiered bronze-trimmed book stacks. The mezzanine floor is composed of glass blocks.

== Related structures and ways ==
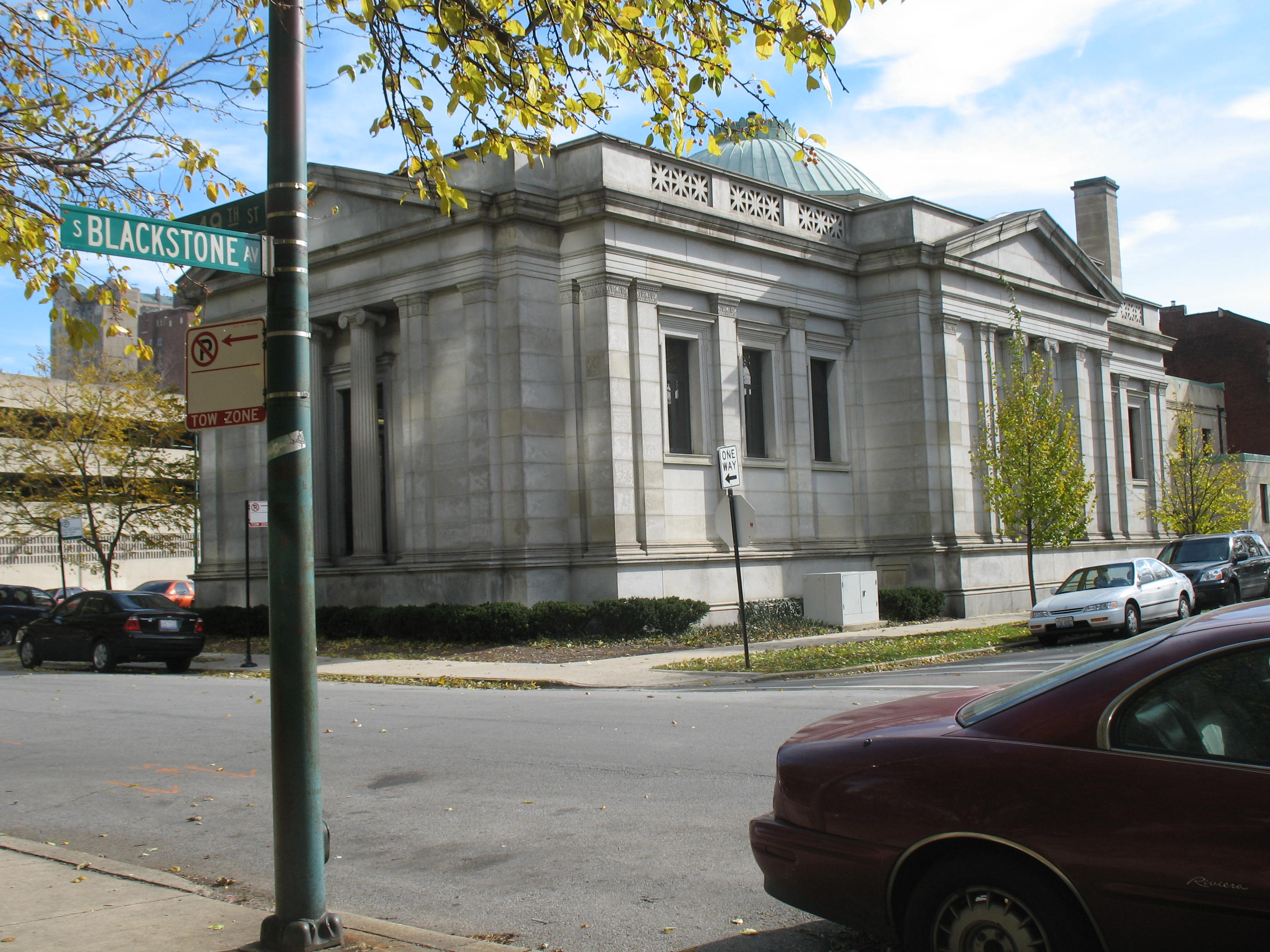
Rear of Blackstone Library from 49th St and Blackstone Ave

Although parts of South Blackstone Avenue south of 53rd Street accommodates two-way traffic, near the library it is a northbound street that accommodates one-way traffic running north along the 1436 east block and ending immediately to the west of (behind) the Blackstone Library at 4900 south (see Kenwood map in external links below and picture to the right). The street was also named after Timothy Blackstone well after the library was built. The Blackstone Library does not bear a Blackstone Avenue address, despite its proximity. The Blackstone Hotel and adjacent Blackstone Theatre (now the Merle Reskin Theatre) would also be named after Timothy Blackstone, whose mansion had stood on their site.

== Gallery ==
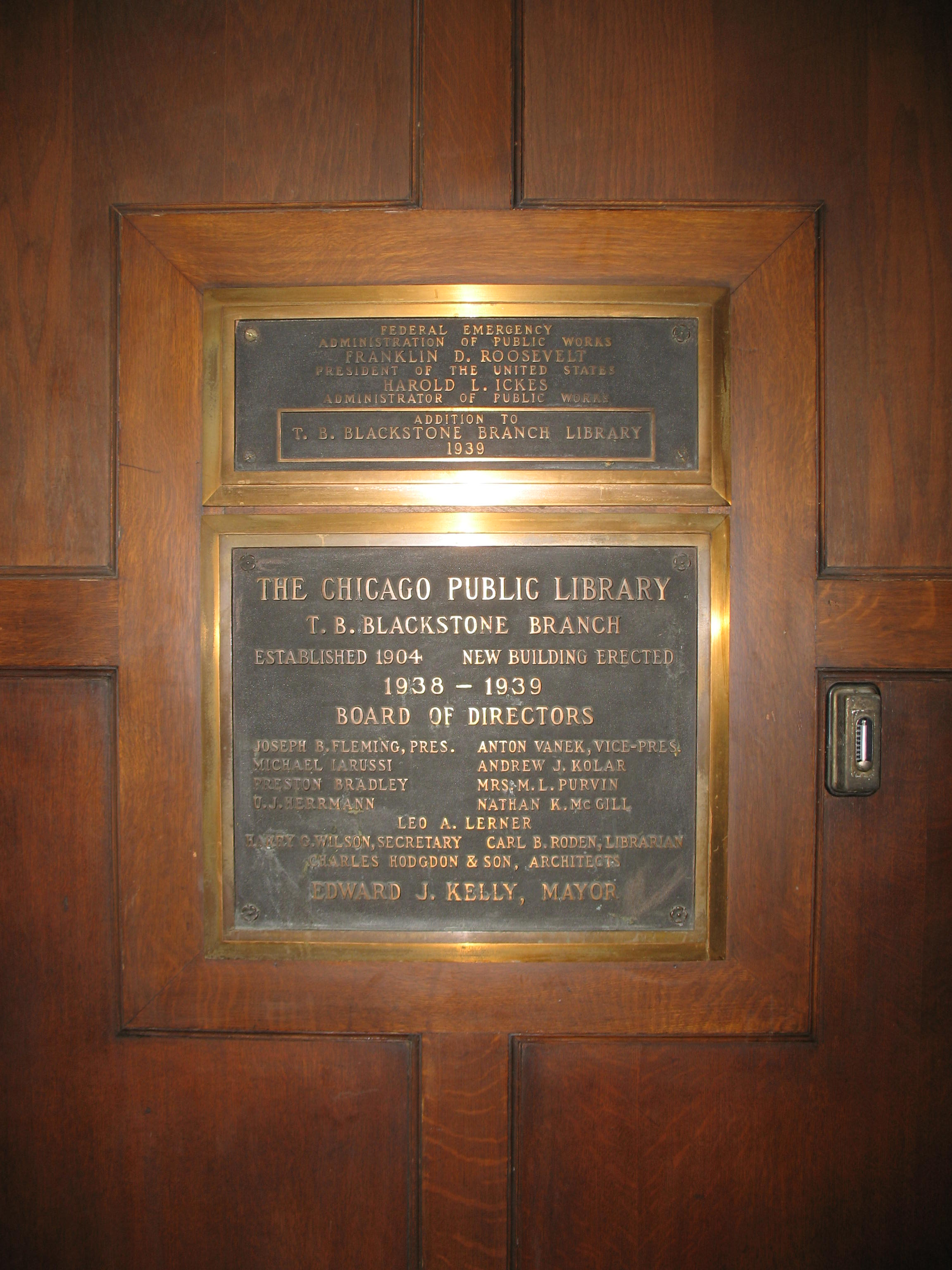
Children's Annex Plaque

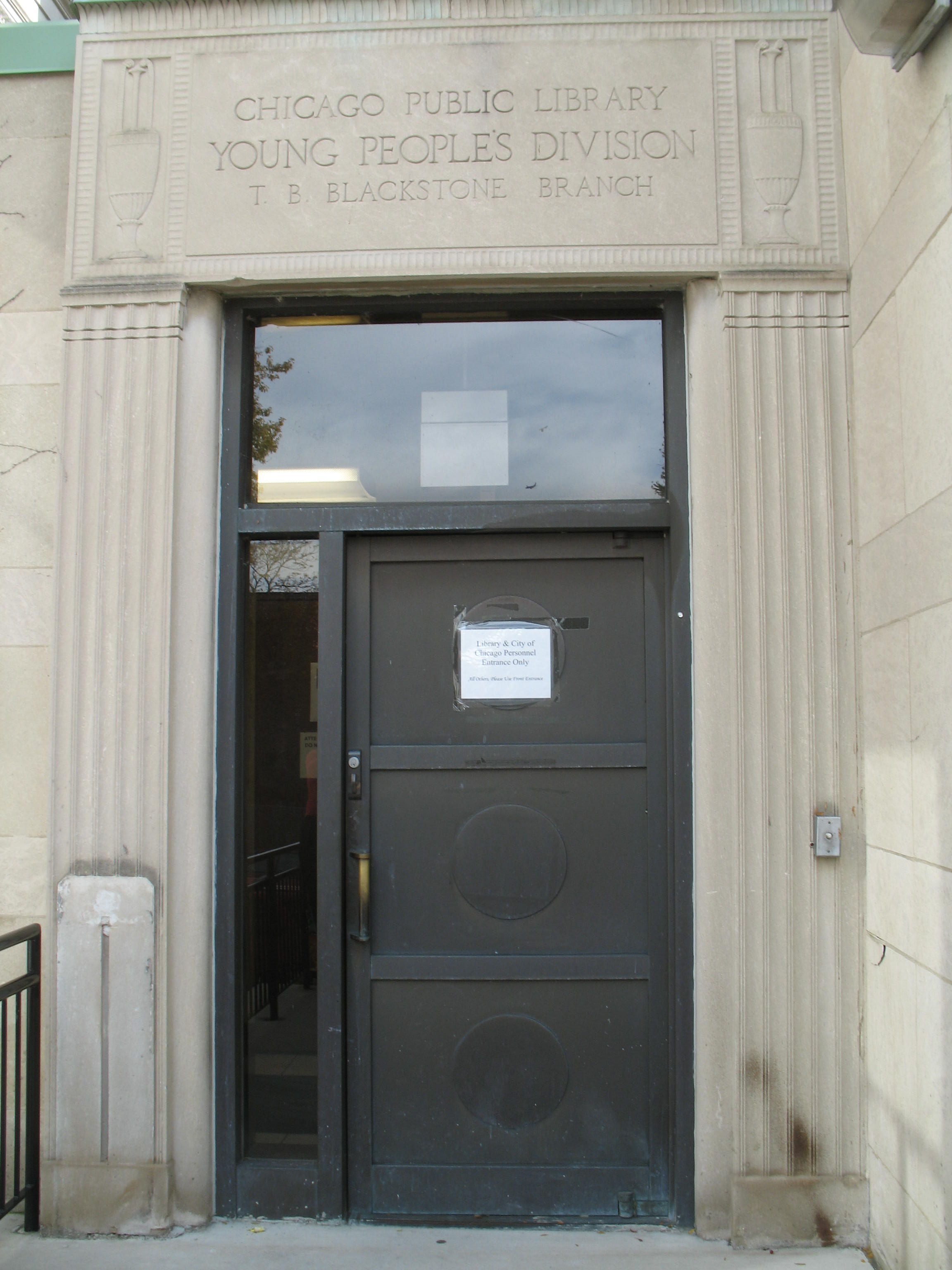
Children's Annex Door

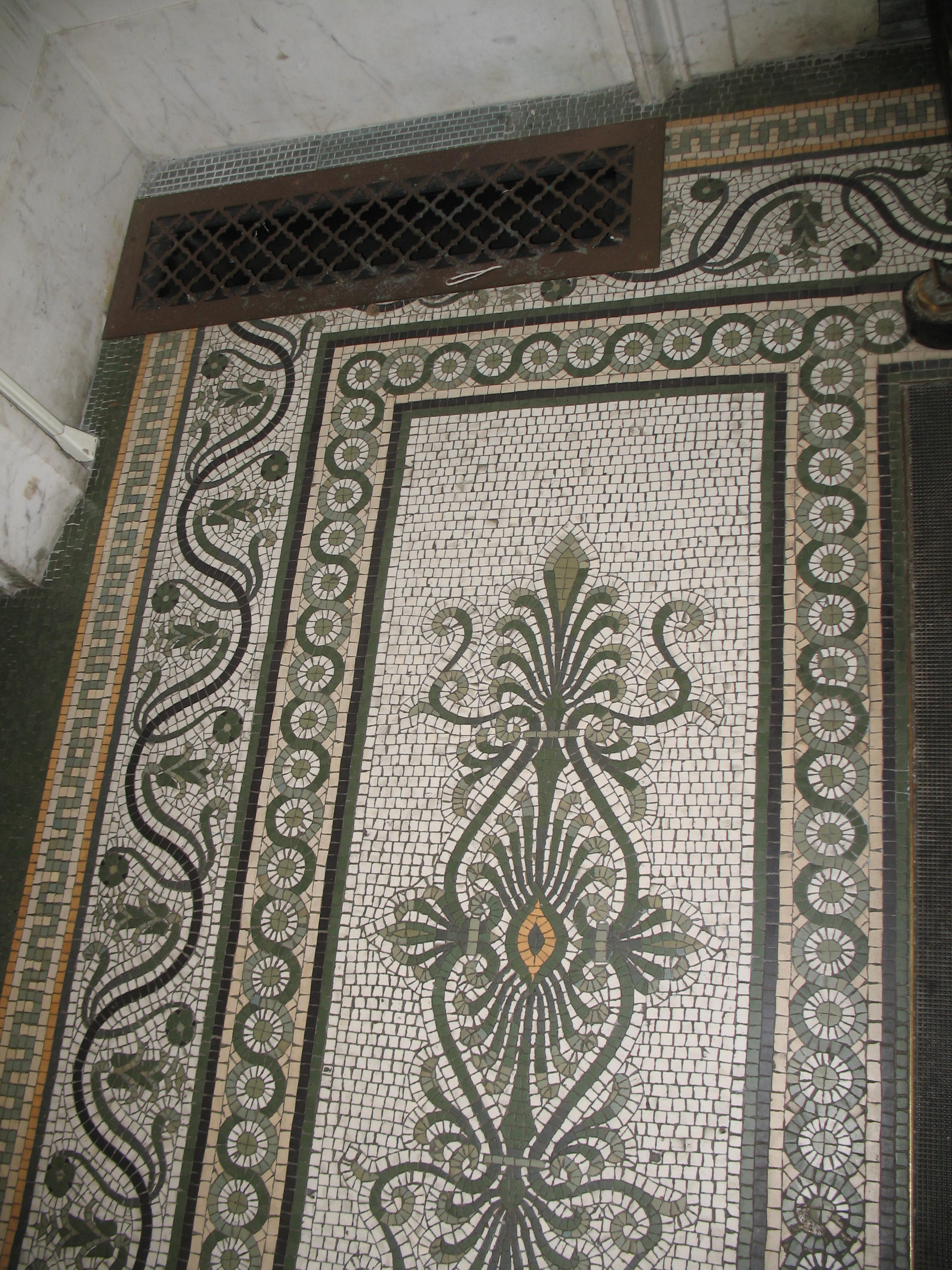
Original Tile Flooring

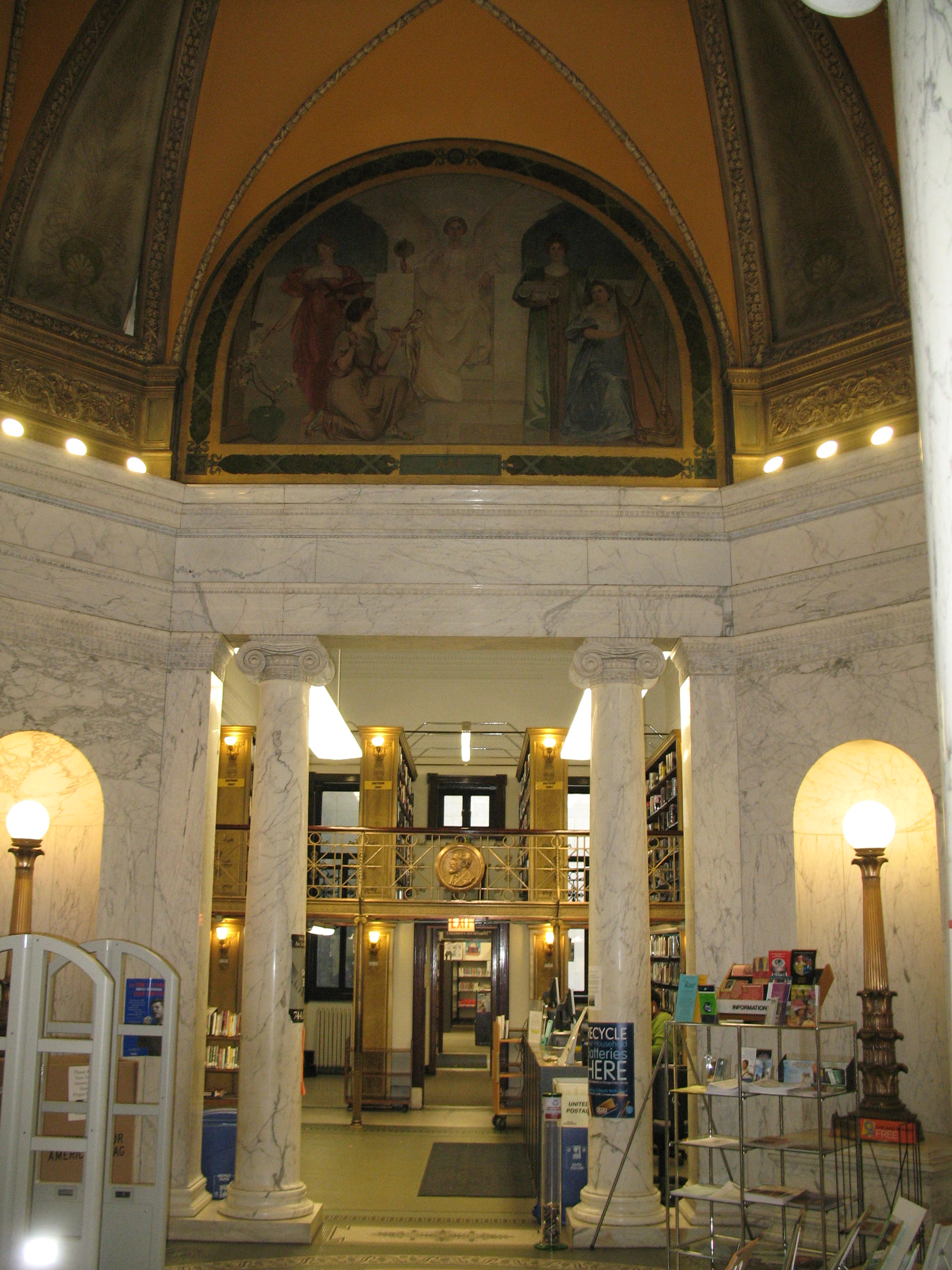
Rotunda and checkout area, murals by Oliver Dennett Grover

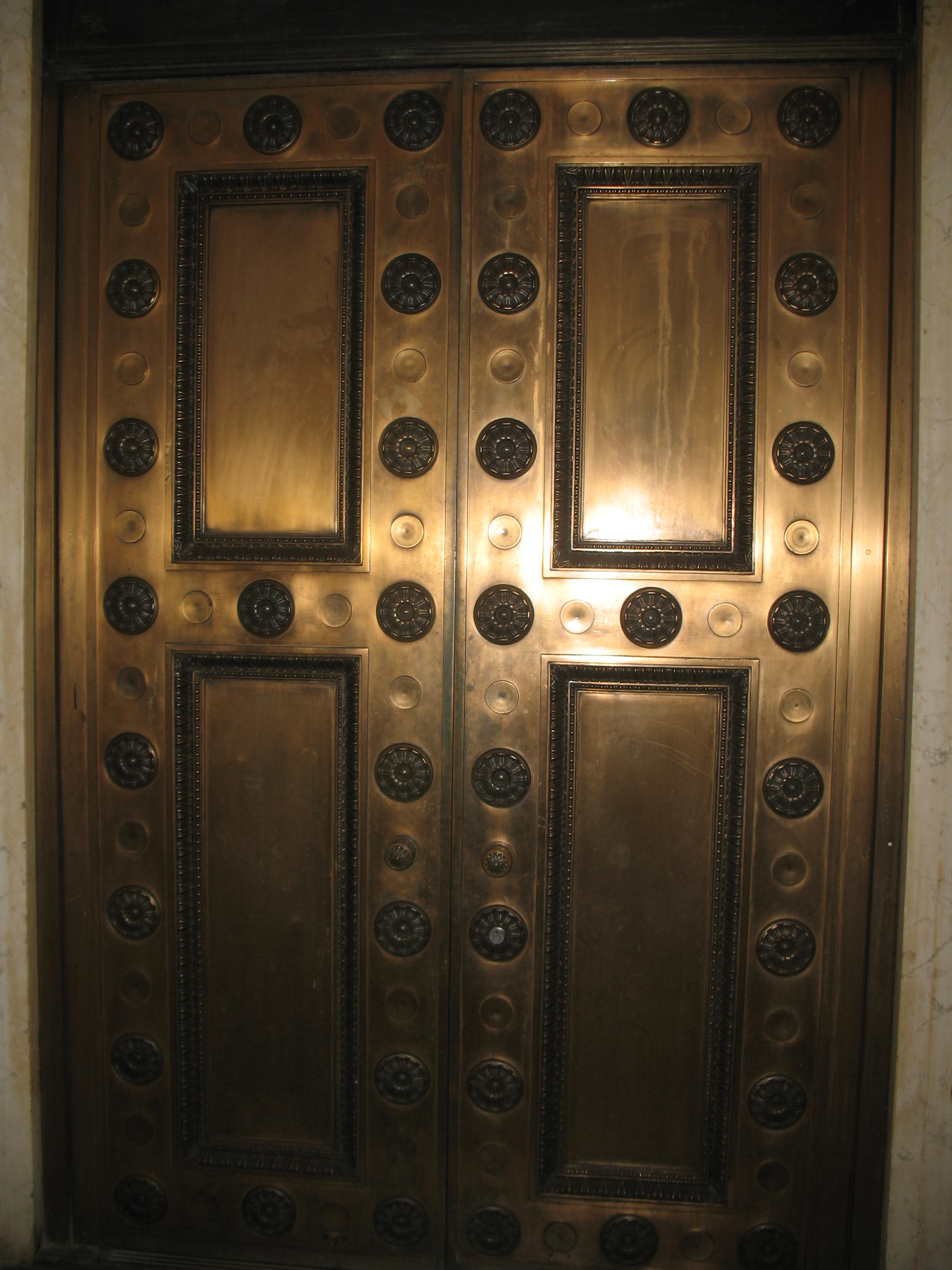
Bronze Doors

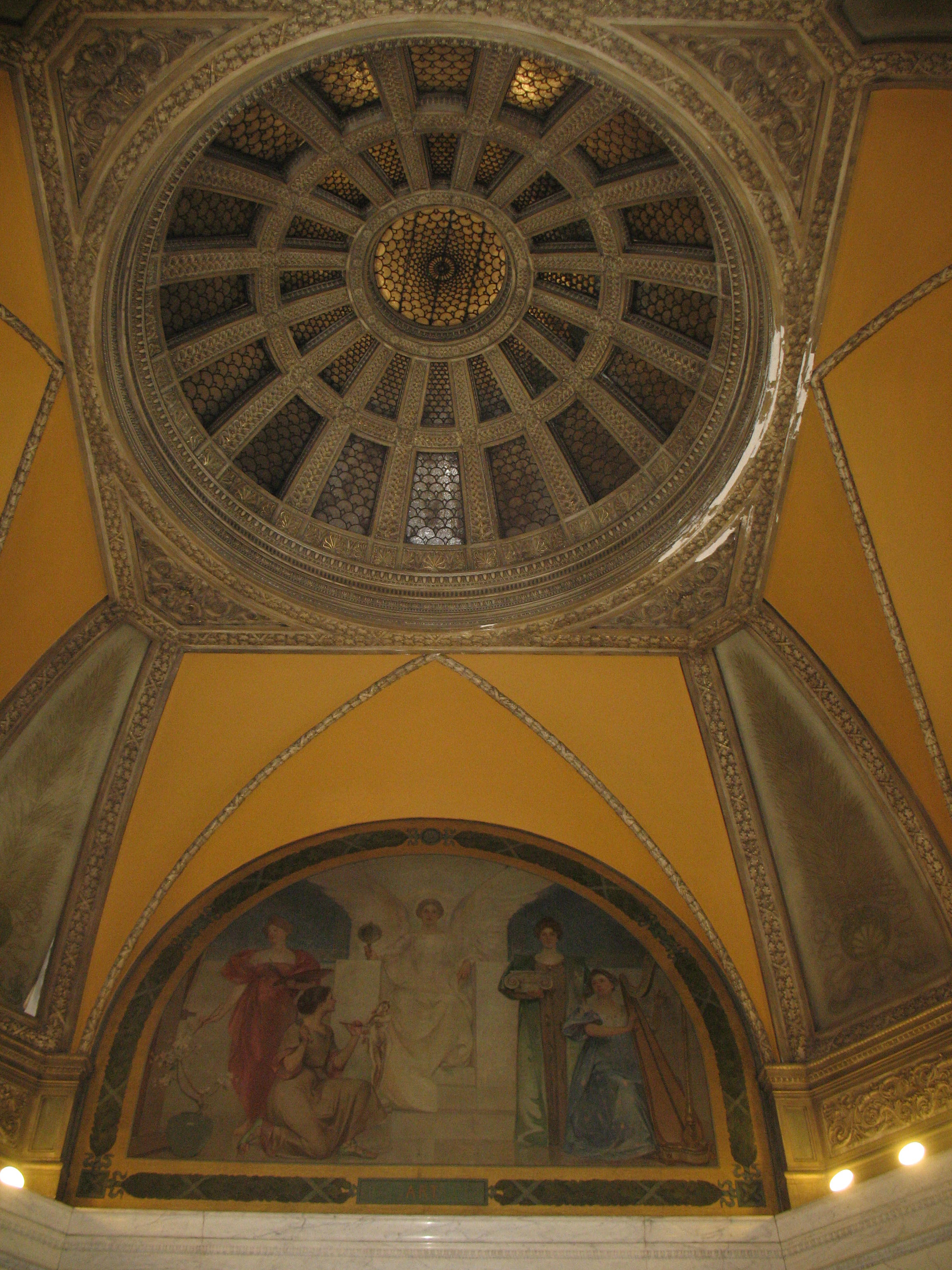
Rotunda Mural
