= A. Homer Byington =

American politician

Aaron Homer Byington

Member of the Connecticut Senate from the 12th District
- In office 1861–1863
- Preceded by: Julius Curtis
- Succeeded by: Morgan Morgans

Member of the Connecticut House of Representatives from Norwalk
- In office 1858–1860 Serving with Daniel K. Nash, William T. Craw
- Preceded by: Josiah Carter, William T. Craw
- Succeeded by: William T. Craw, Samuel E. Olmstead

Personal details
- Born: July 26, 1826 Herkimer, New York
- Died: December 29, 1910 (aged 84) Flushing, Queens, New York
- Resting place: Riverside Cemetery, Norwalk, Connecticut
- Party: Republican, Union Party
- Spouse: Harriet Sophia Richmond (m. November 8, 1849)
- Children: William Homer Byington, George Richmond Byington, and Stuart Woodford Byington, Henry Sumpter Byington (d. 1887), Harriet Eloise Byington (d. in infancy)
- Education: Amos Smith Collegiate School
- Occupation: Newspaper editor

Aaron Homer Byington (July 23, 1826 – December 29, 1910) was the U.S. Consul in Naples from 1897 to 1907. He was a newspaper publisher and editor. He also represented Norwalk in the Connecticut House of Representatives from 1858 to 1860, and was a member of the Connecticut Senate representing the 12th District from 1861 to 1863.

He was born in Herkimer, New York, on July 23, 1826, to Aaron Byington and Sarah Waterbury.

== Career ==
Upon completion of his studies, he worked in a minor position at the Norwalk Gazette. When the New Haven Morning Chronicle began publication with Thomas G. Woodward as editor, Byington became business manager. He remained in this capacity until 1848, when he bought the Norwalk Gazette. In the Gazette, Byington editorialized for giving blacks the vote, a distinctly minority position at the time.

At the outbreak of the American Civil War, and before regiments of Northern troops had arrived to defend Washington, there was a report of a plot to burn the capital. On April 18, 1861, this report mobilized loyal citizens, including Byington, and former congressman Orris S. Ferry, also of Norwalk to form a militia. This militia was led by Cassius Marcellus Clay, and came to be known as the Cassius Clay Guard.

During the war, Byington worked as a lobbyist for Connecticut's arms manufacturers. Byington was a raconteur who eventually got to know Abraham Lincoln and swapped tall tales and jokes with him.

After the war Byington co-founded the New York Sun, along with Edmund C. Stedman and Charles A. Dana.

He was a delegate to the Republican National Convention from Connecticut in 1868 and an alternate in 1880.

In 1897, he suspended operations of the Norwalk Gazette when he was appointed by President William McKinley United States Consul in Naples. He served until 1907.

Byington died on December 29, 1910, in Flushing, New York.

Connecticut State Senate
Preceded by Julius Curtis	Member of the Connecticut Senate from the 12th District; 1861–1863	Succeeded by Morgan Morgans
Connecticut House of Representatives
Preceded by Josiah Carter, William T. Craw	Member of the Connecticut House of Representatives from Norwalk; 1858–1860; With: Daniel K. Nash, William T. Craw	Succeeded by William T. Craw, Samuel E. Olmstead
