= Frederick Bruggerhof =

American politician

Frederick W. Bruggerhof
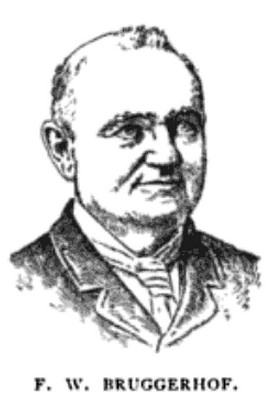

Member of the Connecticut Senate from the 12th District
- In office 1875–1877
- Preceded by: Galen A. Carter
- Succeeded by: Oliver Hoyt

Member of the Connecticut House of Representatives from Darien
- In office 1874–1875

Personal details
- Born: October 15, 1830 Prussia
- Died: March 8, 1920 (aged 89)
- Party: Democratic
- Spouse: Cordelia E. Andreas
- Children: Edward Everett Bruggerhof
- Occupation: seedsman

Frederick W. Bruggerhof (October 15, 1830 – March 8, 1920) was a member of the Connecticut House of Representatives from Darien in 1874, and a member of the Connecticut Senate representing the 12th District from 1875 to 1877.

He was born on October 15, 1830, in Prussia. He spent his early years in the United States in St Louis.

He was the President of James M. Thorburn & Company in New York City, a seed company. He was known as the "grand old man of the seed world."

He was a member of the Electoral College in 1884 and cast his vote for Grover Cleveland.

Connecticut State Senate
Preceded by Galen A. Carter	Member of the Connecticut Senate from the 12th District; 1875–1877	Succeeded by Oliver Hoyt
