= Charles Ballard (politician) =

American politician and dentist

Charles W. Ballard

Member of the Connecticut Senate from the 12th District
- In office 1865–1867
- Preceded by: Morgan Morgans
- Succeeded by: William C. Street

Personal details
- Born: July 6, 1836 Darien, Connecticut, US
- Died: Darien, Connecticut, US
- Occupation: Dentist

Charles W. Ballard (July 6, 1836 – October 15, 1891) was a member of the Connecticut Senate representing the 12th District from 1865 to 1867.

He was the son of Joseph Ballard and Emeline Jones.

In the election of 1865, he defeated Asa Smith 2223 to 1441.

In the election of 1866, he defeated Asa Smith 2448 to 2327.

In his capacity as a senator, he also served as ex officio member of the Corporation of Yale College.

Connecticut State Senate
Preceded by Morgan Morgans	Member of the Connecticut Senate from the 12th District; 1865–1867	Succeeded by William C. Street
