= Oliver Hoyt =

American politician

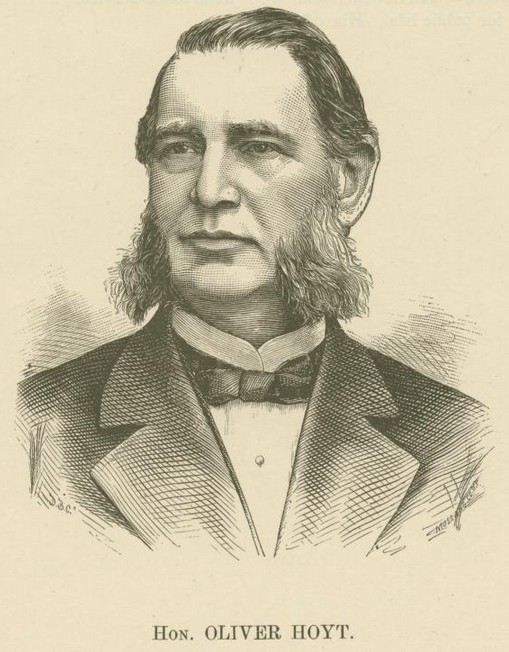

President Pro Tempore of the Connecticut Senate
- In office 1877–1879
- Preceded by: Ephraim H. Hyde
- Succeeded by: Gilbert W. Phillips

Member of the Connecticut Senate from the 12th District
- In office 1877–1881
- Preceded by: Frederick Bruggerhof
- Succeeded by: Edwin L. Scofield

Personal details
- Born: July 24, 1823 Stamford, Connecticut
- Died: May 5, 1887 (aged 63) Stamford, Connecticut
- Resting place: Woodland Cemetery, Stamford, Connecticut
- Party: Republican
- Spouse: Maria Corse (m. 1852; died 1918)
- Children: 8
- Parent(s): Joseph Blachley Hoyt; Mary Blachley Weed
- Occupation: Leather merchant and financier

Oliver Hoyt (July 24, 1823 – May 5, 1887) was a member of the Connecticut Senate from 1877 to 1881. He was President Pro Tempore of the Connecticut Senate from 1877 to 1879.

== Early life ==
Hoyt was born in Stamford, Connecticut on July 24, 1823, the sixth child and son of Joseph Blachley Hoyt (1787–1854) and Mary Blachley Weed (1794–1854), who were married in 1813. His siblings included Joseph Blachley Hoyt (1813–1889), Lyman Hoyt (1815–1891), Mary Catharine Hoyt (1817-1877), William Hoyt (1819–1902), Harvey Hoyt (1821–1893), Sylvester Hoyt (1826–1847), Alvah Hoyt (1829–1853), Emily Maria Hoyt (b. 1831), and Mark Hoyt (1835–1896).

His maternal grandparents were Eliphalet Weed and Martha (née Hoyt) Weed. His paternal grandparents were Joseph Hoyt (1739–1799) and Sarah (née Weed) Hoyt (c. 17467–1830).

He was educated at the common schools in Stamford.

== Career ==
In 1844, Oliver and his brother William formed the firm W. & O. Hoyt in New York City, later known as the "Hoyt Brothers." The firm was one of the best known leather merchants in the City.

In 1872, he was a presidential elector and cast his vote for Ulysses S. Grant. Hoyt was a trustee of a fund of $250,000 that had was raised by private subscription in 1881 for the benefit of Grant and his family, to insure the General an income for the remainder of his life.

From 1877 to 1881, Hoyt served three terms in the Connecticut Senate representing Connecticut's 12th Senate district as a Republican. From 1877 until 1879, he served as President Pro Tempore of the Senate. In 1878, he was chairman of the Joint Special Committee on Federal Relations.

He was a nominee for Governor of Connecticut.

=== Later career ===
After leaving the Senate, he returned to run the Hoyt leather merchant business, which his sons took over after his death. He served as Chairman of Wesleyan College.

== Personal life ==
On October 19, 1852, Hoyt was married to Maria Corse (1830–1918), daughter of John Barney Corse of New York City. Together, they were the parents of eight children:

- Edward Clark Hoyt (1853–1925), who married Cordelia Ida Bruggerhof (d. 1932), the daughter of Frederick Bruggerhof
- Oliver Corse Hoyt (1856–1859), who died young.
- Alice Maria Hoyt (1858–1860), who died young.
- Theodore Rushmore Hoyt (1861–1923)
- Nellie Elinor Hoyt (1864–1865), who died young.
- George Seney Hoyt (1866–1931), who died unmarried.
- Schuyler Colfax Hoyt (1870–1885)
- Walter Stiles Hoyt (1873–1920)

Hoyt was injured when he was thrown from his carriage in Greenwich, Connecticut and broke his collar bone. Oliver Hoyt died at his home in Stamford in 1887. In his will, he left bequests to the Methodist Episcopal Church, Wesleyan University in Middletown, Connecticut, the Missionary Society of the Methodist Episcopal Church of New York, Cornell College, Iowa, and the Methodist Episcopal Hospital of Brooklyn, among others. He left $300,000 to his widow and the remainder of his estate was to be divided amongst his children.

=== Descendants ===
His grandson, Edward Kenneth Hoyt (1885-1938), who attended the Browning School in New York City and the Lawrenceville School and was a 1908 Yale graduate, who married Maria Augusta Daurer DeWust, the daughter of Francisco S. Daurer and Maria E. Kalhwoda, on June 5, 1926, in Paris.

Connecticut State Senate
Preceded by Frederick Bruggerhof	Member of the Connecticut Senate from the 12th District; 1877–1881	Succeeded by Edwin L. Scofield
Preceded by Ephraim H. Hyde	President Pro Tempore of the Connecticut Senate; 1877–1879	Succeeded by Gilbert W. Phillips
