= George E. Lounsbury =

American politician

George Edward Lounsbury
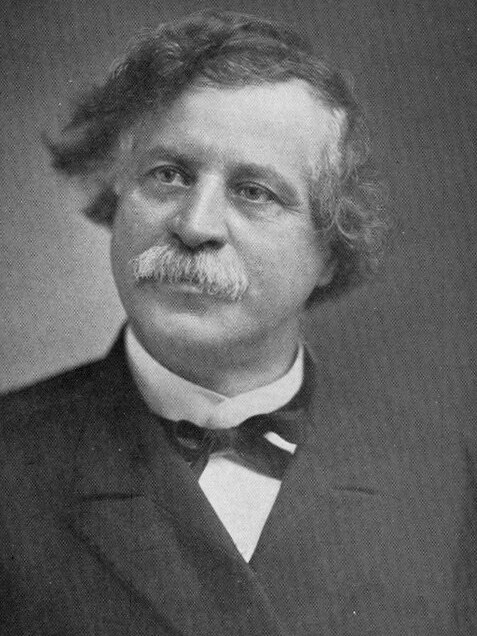

58th Governor of Connecticut
- In office January 4, 1899 – January 9, 1901
- Lieutenant: Lyman A. Mills
- Preceded by: Lorrin A. Cooke
- Succeeded by: George P. McLean

Member of the Connecticut Senate from the 12th District
- In office 1895–1896
- Preceded by: Leander P. Jones
- Succeeded by: Edwin O. Keeler

Personal details
- Born: May 7, 1838 Pound Ridge, New York, U.S.
- Died: August 16, 1904 (aged 66)
- Party: Republican
- Spouse: Frances Josephine Potwin
- Education: Yale College (1863), Berkeley Divinity School (1866)

George Edward Lounsbury (May 7, 1838 – August 16, 1904) was an American politician and the 58th governor of Connecticut from 1899 to 1901. His brother Phineas served as the state’s Governor from 1887 to 1889.

== Early life ==
Lounsbury was born in Pound Ridge, New York, on May 7, 1838, the son of Nathan Lounsbury (1807-1894) and Delia Scofield (1809-1895). He studied at Yale University and graduated in 1863. He then went to Berkeley Divinity School and graduated in 1866. He partnered with his brothers, Phineas C. Lounsbury, and founded two successful shoe factories - the Lounsbury Brothers Inc., a shoe factory and Lounsbury, Matthewson, and Company. He was of English ancestry.

== Politics ==
Lounsbury was a member of the Connecticut Senate representing the 12th District from 1894 to 1898. He became the Governor of Connecticut on January 4, 1899 after winning the 1898 Connecticut gubernatorial election. During his term, he vetoed many bills that helped to reduce the state deficit. He left office on January 9, 1901.

== Personal life ==
Lounsbury married Frances Josephine Potwin (1852-1920). He also was an Episcopal priest. He died on August 16, 1904, aged 66.

== Sources ==
- Sobel, Robert and John Raimo. Biographical Directory of the Governors of the United States, 1789-1978. Greenwood Press, 1988. ISBN 0-313-28093-2

Party political offices
Preceded by Lorrin A. Cooke	Republican nominee for Governor of Connecticut; 1898	Succeeded by George P. McLean
Political offices
Preceded by Lorrin A. Cooke	Governor of Connecticut; January 4, 1899–January 9, 1901	Succeeded by George P. McLean
Connecticut State Senate
Preceded by Leander P. Jones	Member of the Connecticut Senate from the 12th District; 1895–1896	Succeeded by Edwin O. Keeler
