= Laurilla Aleroyla Smith =

- Born: November 26, 1789
- Died: March 19, 1857 (aged 67)
- Alma mater: Litchfield Female Academy
- Occupation: Artist, teacher
- Employer: Emma Willard School; Hartford Female Seminary
- Parent(s): Zephaniah Smith; Hannah Hadassah Hickok Smith
- Relatives: Julia Evelina Smith, Abby Hadassah Smith, Hancy Zephina Smith, Cyrinthia Sacretia Smith
- Awards: Connecticut Women's Hall of Fame

Laurilla Aleroyla Smith (November 26, 1789 – March 19, 1857) was an American painter, educator, and abolitionist.

Laurilla Aleroyla Smith was born on November 26, 1789, one of five daughters of Zephaniah Smith, clergyman turned lawyer, and Hannah Hadassah Hickok Smith of Glastonbury, Connecticut. The Smiths of Glastonbury were all unusually named and unusually outspoken women, ardent abolitionists and suffragists who lived at Kimberly Mansion in Glastonbury.

Laurilla Smith studied at the Litchfield Female Academy beginning in 1802. She taught art and French at the Troy Female Seminary and also taught at the Hartford Female Seminary.

Much of her work was pen and ink sketches of local houses. She also created some historical scenes in watercolor, including The Death of Marc Anthony, The Sons of Tippoo Saib about to be Delivered as Hostages to the English, and Tippoo Saib Delivering his Sons to the English. She designed a home and studio in 1853 to be built across from Kimberly Mansion; it is now owned by artist Harry Smith.

Laurilla Aleroyla Smith died on 19 March 1857.
