= Department store (disambiguation) =

A department store is a retail establishment offering a wide range of consumer goods.

Department Store may also refer to:

- Department Store (1935 film), a British crime film
- Department Store (1939 film), an Italian comedy film
- The Department Store, a 1920 British silent comedy film
- "Department Store" (The Apprentice), a 2016 television episode
- Department Store Historic District, Hartford, Connecticut, United States
