= Connecticut Women's Hall of Fame =

American organization founded 1993

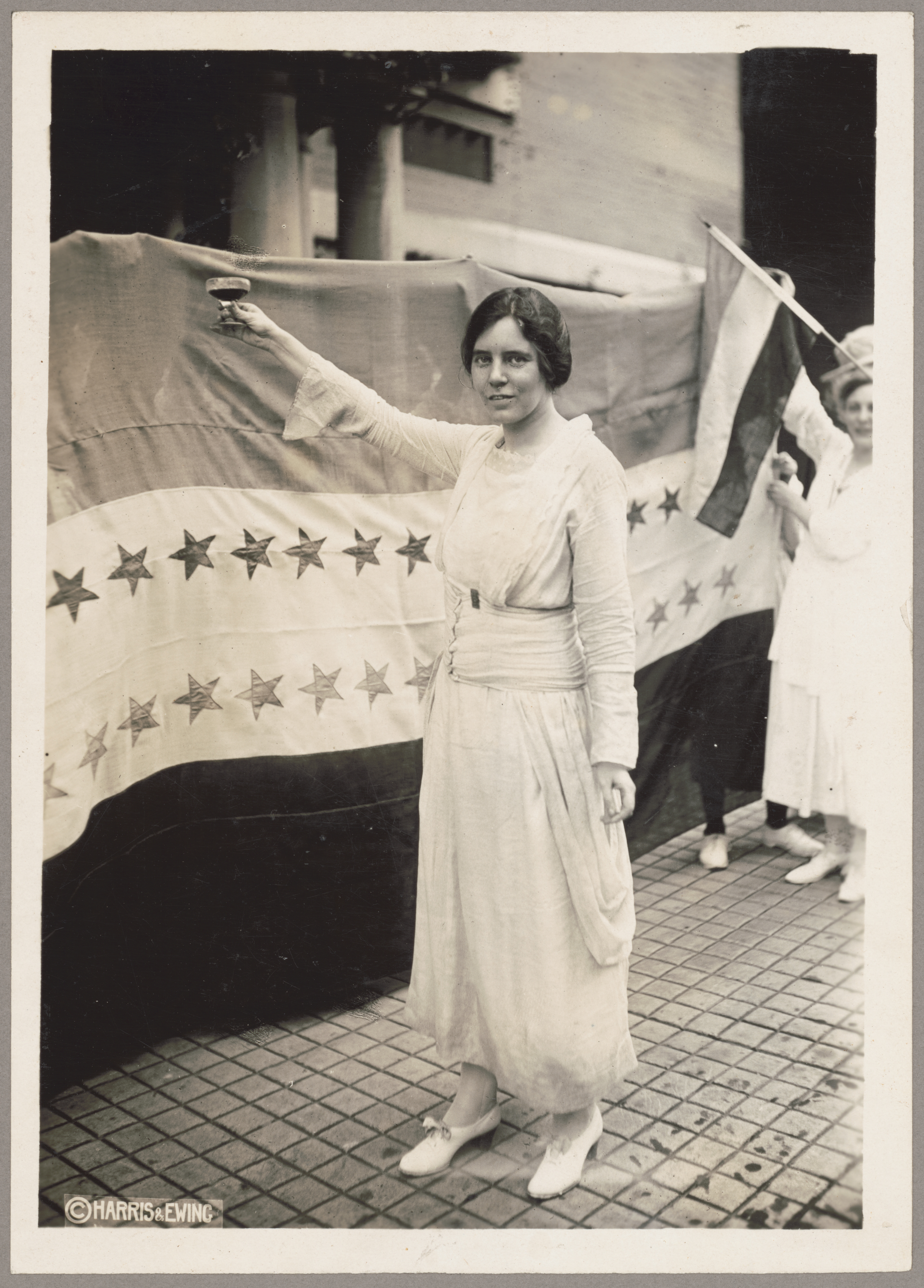
Alice Paul

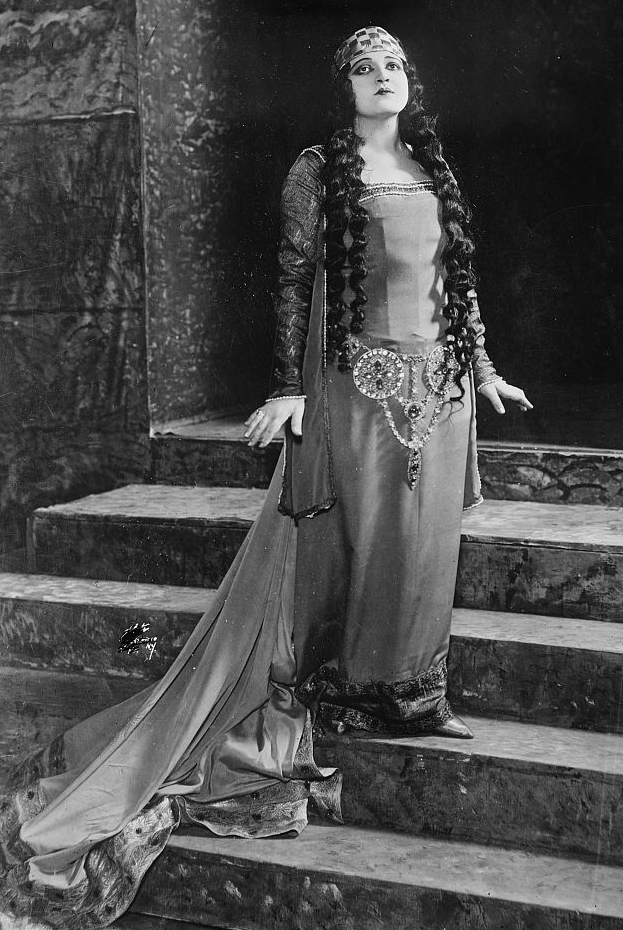
Rosa Ponselle

The Connecticut Women's Hall of Fame (CWHF) recognizes women natives or residents of the U.S. state of Connecticut for their significant achievements or statewide contributions.

The CWHF had its beginnings in 1993 when a group of volunteers partnered with Hartford College for Women to establish an organization to honor distinguished contributions by female role models associated with Connecticut. The first list of inductees contained forty-one women notable to Connecticut's history and culture, many of whom broke down barriers by becoming the first women to establish themselves in fields that had been previously denied to their gender. Alice Paul, who had a role in the passage of the Nineteenth Amendment to the United States Constitution and later wrote the first version of the proposed Equal Rights Amendment, was on the 1994 list of women. Also on that first list were actress Katharine Hepburn and her mother Katharine Martha Houghton Hepburn, who was a pioneer in women's rights and planned parenthood issues. Three of the Beecher clan are on that first list, Hartford Female Seminary founder Catharine Beecher, suffragist Isabella Beecher Hooker, and abolitionist author Harriet Beecher Stowe. Governor Ella T. Grasso was honored in 1994, as was Estelle Griswold, whose landmark Griswold v. Connecticut before the United States Supreme Court resulted in Connecticut's anti-birth control statute being declared unconstitutional.

In the ensuing two decades, the list has more than doubled. Artist Laura Wheeler Waring, who found fame by creating portraits of prominent African Americans during the Harlem Renaissance, was added in 1997. Abstract artist Helen Frankenthaler became part of the list in 2005. African American opera divas are on the list, Marian Anderson in 1994 and Rosa Ponselle in 1998. Ambassador, politician and playwright Clare Boothe Luce's 1994 appearance on the list was later joined by 19th century free black woman journalist Maria W. Stewart in 2001 and by war correspondent and human rights activist Jane Hamilton-Merritt in 1999. In 2008, the list gained Nobel Prize in Medicine winner, geneticist Barbara McClintock. The Pulitzer Prize for General Nonfiction winner Annie Dillard was added to the list in 1997.

The CWHF provides educational resources through two traveling exhibits, the Inductee Portrait Exhibit, and its We Fight For Roses, Too, a set of twenty-two standing panels displaying the stories of the inductees. The CWHF also provides speakers upon request.

== Inductees ==
Connecticut Women's Hall of Fame
Name	Image	Birth–Death	Year	Area of achievement	Ref(s)
Sara Bronin		(b. 1978)	2024	Architect	
Melissa Bernstein			2024	Co-founder of Melissa & Doug	
Barbara Summers		(1944–2014)	2024	Writer, fashion model	
Lisa Cortés		(b. 1960)	2023	Director, producer	
Laura Cruickshank		(b. 1953)	2023	Master Planner and Chief Architect and Associate Vice President, University of Connecticut	
Carla Squatrito		(b. 1941)	2023	Founding president of Carla's Pasta	
Regina Winters-Toussaint		(1969–2016)	2023	Architect, founder of Zared Enterprises, LLC	
Cora Lee Bentley Radcliffe		(1922–2010)	2022	Founded the Tigerettes, the first black female basketball and softball team	
Jennifer Rizzotti		(b. 1974)	2022	President of the Connecticut Sun American professional basketball team. Rizzotti was inducted into the Women's Basketball Hall of Fame in 2013.	
Lhakpa Sherpa		(b. 1973)	2022	Woman's World Record for 10 summits of Mt. Everest	
Suzy Whaley		(b. 1966)	2022	First woman President of the PGA in 2018	
Enola G. Aird			2021	Founder and president of Community Healing Network	
Patricia Baker			2021	Founding leader of the Connecticut Health Foundation	
Josephine Bennett		(1880–1961)	2020	Suffragist	
Donna Berman			2021	Charter Oak Cultural Center, revamping and refocusing its purpose	
Khalilah L. Brown-Dean			2021	Associate Provost for Faculty Affairs and Professor of Political Science at Quinnipiac University	
Frances Ellen Burr		(1831–1923)	2020	Suffragist	
Glynda C. Carr			2021	Political strategist and entrepreneur for empowering Black women.	
Callie Gale Heilmann			2021	Founder, President, and Co-Director of Bridgeport Generation Now	
Jerimarie Liesegang		(1950–2020)	2021	Advocate for transgender rights	
Kica Matos		(b. 1966)	2021	VP of Initiatives at the Vera Institute of Justice	
Marilyn Ondrasik			2021	Advocate for social and economic justice	
Pamela Selders			2021	Activist, owner of Pam's Personals holistic products and services	
Teresa C. Younger		(b. 1969)	2021	Activist, past director of the Connecticut General Assembly's Permanent Commission on the Status of Women and as executive director of the ACLU of Connecticut.	
Catherine Flanagan		(1889–1927)	2020	Suffragist	
Sarah Lee Brown Fleming		(1876–1963)	2020	African American suffragist, civil rights activist	
Clara Hill (suffragist)		(1838–1939)	2020	Suffragist	
Elsie Hill		(1883–1970)	2020	Suffragist	
Helena Hill		(1875–1958)	2020	Suffragist	
Emily Pierson		(1881–1971)	2020	Physician, suffragist	
Marian Chertow		(b. 1955)	2019	Professor of industrial environmental management at the Yale School of Forestry and Environmental Studies	
Nell Newman		(b. 1959)	2019	Founder of Newman's Own Organics pet food	
Martha Langevin		(1901–1978)	2019	With her sister Elizabeth Plouffe, the two last remaining Pequots to live on the Pequot Reservation	
Elizabeth George Plouffe		(1895–1973)	2019	With her sister Martha Langevin, the two last remaining Pequots to live on the Pequot Reservation	
Lucia Chase		(1897–1986)	2018	Co-founder of American Ballet Theatre	
Anika Noni Rose		(b. 1972)	2018	Singer, actress	
Tina Weymouth		(b. 1950)	2018	Musician, author, founding member of Talking Heads	
Kristen Griest		(b. 1989)	2017	Along with Shaye Haver, one of the first two women to graduate from U.S. Army Ranger School.	
Ruth A. Lucas		(1920–2013)	2017	First black female Air Force colonel	
Regina Rush-Kittle		(b. 1961)	2017	Deputy Commissioner for the Department of Emergency Services and Public Protection, Division of Emergency Management and Homeland Security.	
Rebecca Lobo		(b. 1973)	2016	American television basketball analyst and former women's basketball player in the Women's National Basketball Association	
Jane Pauley		(b. 1950)	2016	American television anchor and journalist	
Joyce Yerwood		(1909–1987)	2016	First African American woman physician in Fairfield County	
Margaret Bourke-White		(1904–1971)	2015	American photographer and documentary photographer	
Carolyn Miles		(b. 1961)	2015	CEO and president of Save the Children	
Indra Nooyi		(b. 1955)	2015	CEO of PepsiCo	
Beatrix Farrand		(1872–1959)	2014	Landscape architect	
Jennifer Lawton		(b. 1963)	2014	3D printing pioneer	
Marian Salzman		(b. 1959)	2014	Public relations person	
Rosa DeLauro		(b. 1943)	2013	U.S. Representative for Connecticut's 3rd District	
Barbara Franklin		(b. 1940)	2013	President and CEO of Barbara Franklin Enterprises, 29th U.S. Secretary of Commerce	
Linda Lorimer		(b. 1952)	2013	Vice President of Yale University	
Augusta Lewis Troup		(1848–1920)	2013	Union organizer, journalist and promoter of the suffrage movement	
Anne Garrels		(1951–2022)	2012	Foreign correspondent for National Public Radio	
Annie Leibovitz		(b. 1949)	2012	Portrait photographer	
Faith Middleton		(b. 1948)	2012	Connecticut public radio talk show host	
Isabelle M. Kelley		(1917–1997)	2011	Director Food Stamp Program and principal author of the program	
Denise Lynn Nappier		(b. 1951)	2011	First woman elected state treasurer in Connecticut history, first African American woman elected state treasurer in the nation, and first African American woman elected to statewide office in Connecticut	
Patricia M. Wald		(1928–2019)	2011	Jurist, Chair of the Open Society Institute's Criminal Justice Initiative, Assistant Attorney General for Legislative Affairs for the U.S. Department of Justice, first woman to sit on the U.S. Federal Court of Appeals for the District of Columbia, subsequently serving as its Chief Judge	
Anne M. Mulcahy		(b. 1952)	2010	Former CEO of Xerox Corporation	
Martha Parsons		(1869–1965)	2010	Executive secretary of Landers, Frary and Clark Co.	
Maggie Wilderotter		(b. 1955)	2010	Chairman and CEO of Frontier Communications	
Martha Minerva Franklin		(1870–1968)	2009	Role model for black nurses	
Carolyn M. Mazure		(b. 1949)	2009	Professor of Psychiatry and Psychology, and Associate Dean for Faculty Affairs at Yale School of Medicine; created Women's Health Research at Yale	
Helen L. Smits		(b. 1937)	2009	Advocate for quality healthcare	
Jewel Plummer Cobb		(1924–2017)	2008	Educator, cancer researcher	
Patricia Goldman-Rakic		(1937–2003)	2008	Yale University School of Medicine, pioneer in working memory research	
Barbara McClintock		(1902–1992)	2008	Geneticist and first woman who won the Nobel Prize in Medicine unshared	
Joan Steitz		(b. 1941)	2008	Yale University professor of Molecular Biology and Biochemestry	
Dorothy Hamill		(b. 1956)	2007	Olympic gold medalist skater	
Joan Joyce		(1940–2022)	2007	Multi-sports athlete	
Glenna Collett Vare		(1903–1989)	2007	Champion golfer	
Helen Keller		(1880–1968)	2006	Educator, author	
Mary Townsend Seymour		(1873–1957)	2006	First African American woman to run for state office	
Anne Stanback		(b. 1958)	2006	Founder of Love Makes a Family, advocate LGBT community	
Martha Coolidge		(b. 1946)	2005	First female president (2002) Directors Guild of America	
Helen M. Frankenthaler		(1928–2011)	2005	Abstract expressionist artist	
Rosalind Russell		(1906–1976)	2005	Actress	
Dotha Bushnell Hillyer		(1843–1932)	2003	Built Bushnell Center for the Performing Arts as a memorial to her father	
Clarice "Dollie" McLean		(b. 1936)	2003	Founder of The Artists Collective, a training center for the performing arts	
Florence Griswold		(1850–1937)	2002	Patron of American Impressionism art, Florence Griswold Museum, the Old Lyme Art Colony was headquartered in her home	
Eileen Kraus		(1938–2017)	2002	Business executive	
Miriam Therese Winter		(b. 1938)	2002	Roman Catholic nun, music composer, author	
Laura Nyro		(1947–1997)	2001	Singer, songwriter	
Catherine Roraback		(1920–2007)	2001	Civil liberties attorney	
Maria Miller Stewart		(1803–1879)	2001	Free black woman journalist, abolitionist, women's rights advocate	
Emily Dunning Barringer		(1876–1961)	2000	First female ambulance surgeon and first woman medical resident at New York City's Gouverneur Hospital	
Adrianne Baughns-Wallace		(b. 1944)	2000	News anchor	
Mary Goodrich Jenson		(1907–2004)	2000	Aviation pioneer, newspaper reporter	
Jane Hamilton-Merritt		(b. 1947)	1999	Photo journalist, war correspondent, human rights advocate, nominated for the Nobel Peace Prize	
Sophie Tucker		(1884–1966)	1999	Vaudeville singer and actress	
Antonina Uccello		(1922–2023)	1999	Elected mayor of Hartford in 1967, first female mayor in both the city and the state	
Florence Wald		(1916–2008)	1999	Pioneered hospice care, National Women's Hall of Fame, Dean of Yale School of Nursing, American Academy of Nursing's Living Legend Award	
Dorrit Hoffleit		(1907–2007)	1998	Astronomer who discovered more than 1,000 variable stars, author, Bright Star Catalogue, The General Catalogue of Trigonometric Stellar Parallaxes	
Constance Baker Motley		(1921–2005)	1998	African American civil rights activist, lawyer, judge, New York State Senator	
Rosa Ponselle		(1897–1981)	1998	Opera singer, honored on a U.S. postage stamp	
Lillian Vernon		(1927–2015)	1998	Founded the Lillian Vernon Company	
Mabel Osgood Wright		(1859–1935)	1998	Founder and first president of Connecticut Audubon Society; established first bird sanctuary in U.S. in Fairfield, CT	
Elizabeth Hart Jarvis Colt		(1826–1905)	1997	Widow of Samuel Colt, donated her entire art and firearms collection to Wadsworth Atheneum Museum, and provided funding to erect a Colt Memorial wing of the museum	
Annie Dillard		(b. 1945)	1997	Pulitzer Prize for General Nonfiction, Pilgrim at Tinker Creek	
Margo Rose		(1903–1997)	1997	American Puppet Theater	
Laura Wheeler Waring		(1887–1948)	1997	Educator and artist who created portraits of prominent African Americans during the Harlem Renaissance	
Edythe J. Gaines		(1922–2006)	1996	Superintendent of schools (first female and first African American) Hartford, director Hartford National Corp.	
Madeleine L'Engle		(1918–2007)	1996	Newbery Award for children's literature	
Susanne Langer		(1895–1985)	1996	Educator, philosopher	
Helen M. Feeney		(1919–2004)	1995	Roman Catholic Chancellor of the Archdiocese	
Caroline Maria Hewins		(1846–1926)	1995	Children's library services	
Donna Lopiano		(b. 1946)	1995	Athlete, gender equality in sports advocate	
Maria C. Sanchez		(1926–1989)	1995	First Hispanic woman elected to the Connecticut General Assembly	
Mary Jobe Akeley		(1886–1966)	1994	Explorer	
Anni Albers		(1899–1994)	1994	Textile artist	
Marian Anderson		(1897–1993)	1994	Opera singer who broke ground for African Americans	
Beatrice Fox Auerbach		(1887–1968)	1994	Philanthropist, president and director of G. Fox & Co., from 1938 to 1959 she made her store available to Connecticut College for Women as a training program for retail education.	
Emma Fielding Baker		(1828–1916)	1994	Mohegan medicine woman, tribal historian and documentarian	
Evelyn Longman Batchelder		(1874–1954)	1994	Sculptor	
Catharine Beecher		(1800–1878)	1994	Proponent of education for women, founded Hartford Female Seminary	
Jody Cohen		(b. 1954)	1994	Rabbi	
Prudence Crandall		(1803–1890)	1994	Abolitionist who accepted black students into her female academy in Canterbury, Connecticut	
Katharine Seymour Day		(1870–1964)	1994	Preservationist who rescued historic homes	
Fidelia Hoscott Fielding		(1827–1908)	1994	Last native speaker of the Mohegan Pequot language	
Charlotte Perkins Gilman		(1860–1935)	1994	Sociologist and author	
Dorothy Goodwin		(1914–2007)	1994	Five-term Democratic state representative	
Ella Tambussi Grasso		(1919–1981)	1994	Governor of Connecticut	
Estelle Griswold		(1900–1981)	1994	Griswold v. Connecticut, United States Supreme Court ruled that Connecticut's anti-birth control statute was unconstitutional	
Mary Hall		(1843–1927)	1994	After passing the Connecticut Superior Court exam, won an 1882 ruling from Chief Justice John Park of the Connecticut Supreme Court of Errors that women were entitle to equal protection under Connecticut statutes and entitled to practice law in the state.	
Alice Hamilton		(1869–1970)	1994	First woman appointed to the faculty of Harvard University	
Katharine Hepburn		(1907–2003)	1994	Actress	
Katharine Martha Houghton Hepburn		(1878–1951)	1994	Women's rights and Planned Parenthood	
Isabella Beecher Hooker		(1822–1907)	1994	Founder of the Connecticut Women's Suffrage Association	
Emeline Roberts Jones		(1836–1916)	1994	Dentist, considered by some to be the first woman dentist in America	
Barbara Kennelly		(b. 1936)	1994	United States House of Representatives	
Clare Boothe Luce		(1903–1987)	1994	United States Ambassador to Brazil, United States Ambassador to Italy, United States House of Representatives, Presidential Medal of Freedom, playwright, novelist	
Rachel Taylor Milton		(1901–1995)	1994	Co-founder of the Urban League of Greater Hartford	
Alice Paul		(1885–1977)	1994	Suffragist, founder National Woman's Party	
Ellen Ash Peters		(1930–2024)	1994	First woman Chief Justice of the Connecticut Supreme Court	
Ann Petry		(1908–1997)	1994	Author	
Sarah Porter		(1813–1900)	1994	Founder Miss Porter's School, private college prep school for girls	
Theodate Pope Riddle		(1867–1946)	1994	Architect	
Edna Negron Rosario		(b. 1944)	1994	Educator	
Margaret Fogarty Rudkin		(1898–1967)	1994	Founder of Pepperidge Farm	
Susan Saint James		(b. 1946)	1994	Actress, philanthropist	
Lydia Huntley Sigourney		(1791–1865)	1994	Poet	
Virginia Thrall Smith		(1836–1903)	1994	Women's and children's rights advocate	
The Smiths of Glastonbury			1994	Sisters Hannah, Hancy, Cynrinthia, Laurilla, Julia and Abby. Family of early suffragists. Their home Kimberly Mansion is listed on the NRHP for Glastonbury.	
Hilda Crosby Standish		(1902–2005)	1994	Connecticut's first birth control clinic	
Harriet Beecher Stowe		(1811–1896)	1994	Abolitionist, author	
Gladys Tantaquidgeon		(1899–2005)	1994	Mohegan anthropologist, author, council member, and elder	
Betty Tianti		(1929–1994)	1994	First female president of a state AFL-CIO	
Hannah Bunce Watson		(1750–1807)	1994	Newspaper publisher whose printed output supported the American Revolutionary War	
Chase Going Woodhouse		(1890–1984)	1994	First female Connecticut Secretary of State, United States House of Representatives	
