= Hilda Crosby Standish =

American physician (1902–2005)

Hilda C. Standish
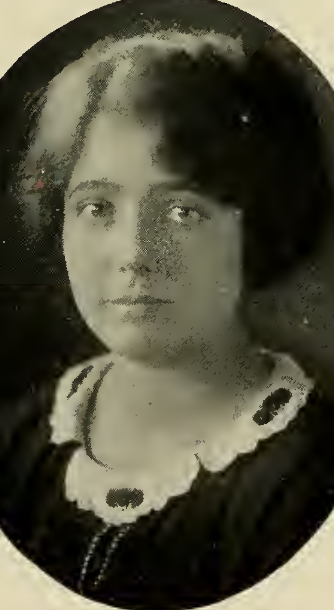
- Hilda C. Crosby, from the 1924 Wellesley College yearbook
- Born: 1902
- Died: June 1, 2005 (aged 102–103)
- Education: Wellesley College; Cornell Medical College
- Occupation: Maternal Health Center medical director
- Known for: Birth control advocate
- Spouse: Erland Myles Standish

Hilda Crosby Standish (1902 – June 1, 2005) was a pioneer in the birth control movement in the state of Connecticut. In 1935, she became medical director of the Maternal Health Center in Hartford, the state's first birth control clinic. Dr. Standish was inducted into the Connecticut Women's Hall of Fame in 1994.

== Early life and education ==
Hilda Crosby was born to Julia and Albert Hutchings Crosby of Hartford, Connecticut in 1902. After graduating from Hartford Public High School, she attended Wellesley College, where she received a bachelor's degree in zoology in 1924. Crosby earned her medical degree at Cornell Medical College in 1928, graduating third in her class. Dr. Standish interned at Philadelphia General Hospital and served a one-year residency at the St. Louis Maternity Hospital in Missouri.

== Medical career ==
Upon completion of her residency, she accepted a five-year appointment in 1932 to teach obstetrics in the Women's Christian Medical College, and the Margaret Williamson Hospital of Shanghai, China. After two years, she had to return to the United States because of an illness in the family. The family member's health improved, but Crosby was unable to return to China because the Japanese military had invaded the country.

In 1935, Katharine Martha Houghton Hepburn (mother of actress Katharine Hepburn) recruited Standish to be medical director of the Maternal Health Center in Hartford, the state's first birth control clinic. Due to an 1879 statute, it was illegal to operate a birth control clinic or to disseminate information about birth control in Connecticut.

On June 25, 1936, Hilda Crosby married dermatologist Erland Myles Standish of Wethersfield. The couple had five children, which made it difficult for Standish to maintain a full-time medical practice. Instead, Standish worked part-time and led sex education classes for adolescents, couples entering into marriage, and parents she met through her work at the Maternal Health Center. The Hartford clinic was forced to close in 1940, after police raided a similar clinic in Waterbury. She was trustee at the Hartford College for Women and Wellesley College.

Standish continued to support Planned Parenthood's efforts to legalize birth control in the state. She testified before the state legislature in an effort to change the law that made the use of contraceptives illegal. She worked closely with Planned Parenthood of Connecticut Executive Director Estelle Griswold, one of the plaintiffs in the landmark Supreme Court case Griswold v. Connecticut.

In recognition of her dedication to advancing reproductive rights in the state, Planned Parenthood of Connecticut renamed its West Hartford site the Hilda Crosby Standish, MD Clinic in 1983.
