= Beatrice Fox Auerbach =

American philanthropist (1887–1968)

- Born: Beatrice Fox; July 17, 1887; Hartford, Connecticut, U.S.
- Died: November 29, 1968 (age 81); Hartford, Connecticut, U.S.
- Occupation: Businesswoman
- Known for: President and director of G. Fox & Co.
- Spouse: George Auerbach (m. 1911)
- Children: 2
- Family: Gerson Fox (grandfather)

Beatrice Fox Auerbach (July 17, 1887 – November 29, 1968) was an American philanthropist, educator, labor reform pioneer, and president and director of G. Fox & Co. from 1938 to 1959. Upon her father's death in 1938, she took over the Hartford, Connecticut-based G. Fox & Co. Under her stewardship, it became the largest department store in New England.

While executive of this enterprise she also led the nation in labor reform programs such as the 40-hour work week and a retirement program. As a female executive, she recognized the importance of educating women in business and management. From 1938 to 1959, she made her store available to the Connecticut College for Women (now Connecticut College) as a training program for retail education. After creating the Beatrice Fox Auerbach Foundation, she began extensively investing her time in various philanthropies. In 1945, she established the Service Bureau for Women's Organizations. After 29 years as an executive, she sold the business to the May Company in 1965. Auerbach died in Hartford on November 29, 1968. She was inducted into the Connecticut Women's Hall of Fame in 1994.

== Early life and education ==
Beatrice Fox was born to a Jewish family on July 17, 1887, in Hartford, Connecticut. Born to Moses and Theresa Fox, she was the eldest of two daughters. Her father Moses was the son of Gerson Fox, founder of the G. Fox and Co. department store in Hartford, an enterprise of which she would later become the president. Beatrice was well traveled and attended several schools, although she did not obtain a degree. After marrying George Auerbach in 1911, she moved to Salt Lake City, where his family owned a department store.

While Beatrice Auerbach did not graduate from college, she was awarded honorary degrees at Trinity College, Wesleyan University, and Saint Joseph College.

=== Adult life ===
In 1916, Auerbach gave birth to her first child, Georgette. In 1917, the family returned to Hartford to recover from a fire at G. Fox & Co. Their second child, Dorothy, was born in Connecticut in 1919. Upon her father's death in 1938, she took over the G. Fox & Co department store. Under her stewardship, it became the largest department store in New England. While executive of this enterprise she also led the nation in labor reform programs such as the 40-hour work week and a retirement program.

After 27 years as executive, Auerbach sold the business to The May Department Stores Company in 1965, declaring: "One thing you can be certain of is that I won't be spending [the profits from the sale] on yachts and horses, but for the benefit of the people." Auerbach died in Hartford on November 29, 1968.

After her death, one-third of her estate, which accumulated several million dollars, went to the Beatrice Fox Auerbach Foundation. Auerbach left the rest of her money to friends and employees, as well as the Koopman and Schiro Funds, which, established by her daughters, supported charitable, educational, and cultural philanthropic efforts.

== Career ==
Auerbach took over her family business in 1938, after her father died. Under her leadership, G. Fox and Co. became the largest department store in America. There, she commanded a workforce of 3-5,000 people at a time. Auerbach was a labor reform pioneer, instituting the five-day, 40-hour work week, retirement plans and paid sick leave. She also gave interest-free loans to employees in crisis. As an executive, she revolutionized the industry with her free delivery service, telephone order service and automated billing. Auerbach also made it a priority to hire Black women and men to work in her store. In 1939, she established the Moses Fox Club, named for her father. This club gave membership to employees who had given 25 years of service to G. Fox and Co. Her generosity made her a well-loved boss, and she was known as "Mrs. A." to her staff. Auerbach invited employees to dine with her at the store’s cafeteria on their birthdays. Around the holidays, she was known to have walked the sales floor, shaking hands with each member of her staff and addressing each by their names.

Auerbach also served on the board of trustees of the Hartford College for Women, the American School for the Deaf, and at Hebrew Union College, as well as being a delegate at the White House Conference on Education in 1955.

== Philanthropy ==
Auerbach was dedicated to enriching not only the lives of her workers, but her community as well. With the wealth that she had accumulated from the success of G. Fox and Co., she founded the Beatrice Fox Auerbach Foundation, a charitable and educational organization dedicated to enriching the public, "regardless of creed, sex, color, or race." Through her foundation, Auerbach donated to organizations, hospitals, and institutions of higher education, and made contributions to St. Francis, Mt. Sinai, and Hartford hospitals, and to subsidized programs for the Hartford Symphony and Wadsworth Atheneum Museum of Art. From 1938 to 1959, she worked with the Connecticut College for Women (now Connecticut College) in a retailing program. She found this to be important as one of the few women in her field at the time. In 1941, the foundation was poised to become a corporation. This move gained strong support from Secretary of State Chase Going Woodhouse, and was called "the solution to the problem" facing Hartford by Judge Elsner, who presided over this decision. Four years later in 1945, Auerbach established the Service Bureau for Women's Organizations. The goal of this was to teach women how to coordinate activities, run meetings and be effective lobbyists. On July 6, 1944, just one month after D-Day, the famous Ringling Brothers Barnum & Bailey Circus fire occurred in Hartford, causing more than 100 deaths and many serious injuries. Mrs Auerbach sent 500 sandwiches and 25 gallons of coffee to Municipal Hospital, which was overwhelmed with many casualties. Hearing that there was a shortage of bedding and night clothes, she also sent over a truckload of brand new sheets and pajamas the G Fox price tags still attached.

=== Auerbach major ===
Because of her work as one of the few women in business administration, Auerbach decided to form a major that prepared young women for higher-level positions. She felt that because “There [were] a number of institutions offering such preparation to young men. The need of more such opportunities for young women [was] self-evident.” From 1938–1959, she worked with the Connecticut College for Women (now Connecticut College) in a retailing program. To gain this degree Auerbach proposed that women take classes in psychology, history, foreign language, economics, and English, focusing on business correspondence. During their junior year, the women would take part in a service learning at a business in their field to gain real-life experience. This major was not seen as a new department, but a collaboration between Gov, home economics, social science, and art. To start this program, Auerbach donated $1,350 ($22,634.25 USD today) for the preliminary planning period, and $10,000 ($167,661.11 today) for the two-year development of the major. Chase Going Woodhouse, an economics professor at Connecticut College at the time, described Auerbach as having a “forward way of looking at education.”

Examples of the classes taken:

- Economic History
- Social and Intellectual History
- Basic Statistical Concepts
- Accounting
- Banking
- Corporation Finance
- Investment Principles
- Insurance
- Labor problems

After graduating, the women who completed the Auerbach Major went on to do great things: seven women ended up in department store work; eight were working for the government, two in Naval intelligence, and one working for the Office of Price Administration, where it was said that her experience through the Auerbach major led them to hire her; one was a travelling instructor for a large business machine company, along with many other accomplishments.

Although the major was dissolved in 1959, the Auerbach Foundation continued to support a lecture series at the college. In 1951, the Auerbach foundation supported the Service Bureau for Women’s Organizations Conference at Connecticut College.

== Awards and recognition ==
Auerbach was on the board of Hebrew Union College in Cincinnati and won numerous awards, including the Tobe award for distinguished service by others in her industry, a certificate of lifetime membership in the NAACP, "Boss of the Year" from the Greater Hartford Jaycees, the Distinguished Public Service Award from the State Bar Association in 1962 and the Human Relations Award of the Connecticut-Western Massachusetts Region of the National Conference of Christians and Jews in 1964.

The School of Business Administration at the University of Hartford named Auerbach Hall in her honor, the library at the Wadsworth Atheneum Museum of Art was renamed the Auerbach Art Library, and a new unit was built under her name at St. Francis Hospital in Hartford, CT.

Awards she received included:

- Tobé Award, given to a retailer who benefits their community and retailing nationwide (1947)
- "Boss of the Year" from the Greater Hartford Jaycees (1952)
- The Distinguished Public Service Award from the State Bar Association (1962)
- The Human Relations Award of the Connecticut-Western Massachusetts Region of the National Conference of Christians and Jews (1964).
- She also received posthumous induction into the Connecticut Women’s Hall of Fame.
- Recognition in other forms included honorary degrees at Trinity College, Saint Joseph College, and Wesleyan University.
- The School of Business Administration at the University of Hartford named Auerbach Hall in her honor
- The library at the Wadsworth Atheneum Museum of Art was renamed as the Auerbach Art Library
