= Eileen Kraus =

American banker

- Born: Eileen Shanley; July 19, 1938; Short Hills, New Jersey, US
- Died: July 1, 2017 (aged 78); Connecticut, US
- Education: Mount Holyoke College (BA); Trinity College (MA)
- Occupations: Business executive, banker
- Known for: First woman president of a major bank in the State of Connecticut
- Awards: Connecticut Women's Hall of Fame inductee (2002)

Eileen Shanley Kraus (July 19, 1938 – July 1, 2017) was an American business executive who broke the glass ceiling to be the first woman to run a major bank in Connecticut. She was inducted into the Connecticut Women's Hall of Fame in 2002.

== Early life and education ==
Born to parents Janet and John Shanley, Kraus was raised in Maplewood and Short Hills, New Jersey, graduating from Columbia High School. Kraus graduated magna cum laude in 1960 from Mount Holyoke College, where she was class president. After training to become an executive secretary at Gibbs College, she married salesman Harold C. "Hal" Kraus in 1961 and moved from Northampton to West Hartford, Connecticut.

Soon after moving to Connecticut, Kraus was hired as administrative assistant to Secretary of the State Ella Grasso, who had contacted Mount Holyoke (her alma mater) seeking recommendations for a secretary. Kraus went on to attend Trinity College, where she worked in fundraising and earned a Master of Arts degree in political science in 1965.

== Career ==
After the birth of her daughter in 1966, Kraus left paid employment to focus on volunteer activities. She became active in the Junior League of Hartford and serve as the League's president from 1973 to 1975. She also chaired the Governor’s Council on Voluntary Action and served as a trustee of the University of Connecticut Foundation. In 1975, she launched her own company, Career Search Resources, providing career support to women and helping Hartford-area businesses recruit women.

In 1979, Kraus became vice president of human resources planning and development at the Hartford National Bank. She rose through the executive suite to become vice chair of Shawmut National Corporation in 1990 and president of Connecticut National Bank in 1992. She retired as chair of Fleet Bank Connecticut in 2000.

== Service ==
Kraus chaired the Greater Hartford Chamber of Commerce and Community Economic Development Foundation and served as a trustee of Trinity College and Kingswood-Oxford School and as a board member of the Connecticut Business and Industry Association, the Capitol Region Growth Council, Yale New Haven Hospital, and many other community and corporate boards. After her retirement, Kraus served as vice chair of the Capitol City Economic Development Authority, chair of ConnectiCare, vice president of the Bushnell Center for the Performing Arts, and a member of the boards of directors of Stanley Black & Decker, the Kaman Corporation, and the Rogers Corporation.

== Honors ==
Kraus received numerous awards and honors in the 1990s and 2000s. She was recognized as Business Leader of the Year by the Hartford Courant (1990), a Woman of Merit by the Connecticut Valley Girl Scout Council (1994), and Laura A. Johnson Woman of the Year by the Hartford College for Women (1998). She was a 2002 inductee into the Connecticut Women’s Hall of Fame and also received honorary doctorates from the University of Hartford and Charter Oak State College.

Kraus was the founding chair of the Connecticut Women’s Hall of Fame Board of Trustees. The Eileen Kraus Scholarship was established in 2016 with support from the Kaman Corporation. The scholarship awards $5,000 each year to an outstanding Connecticut woman starting her first year of higher education.

== Personal life ==
A resident of West Hartford since 1961, Kraus died of pancreatic cancer in 2017. Her children, Janet Kraus Giebutowski and Stephen H. C. Kraus, survived her.
