= Apartment at 49–51 Spring Street =

- U.S. National Register of Historic Places
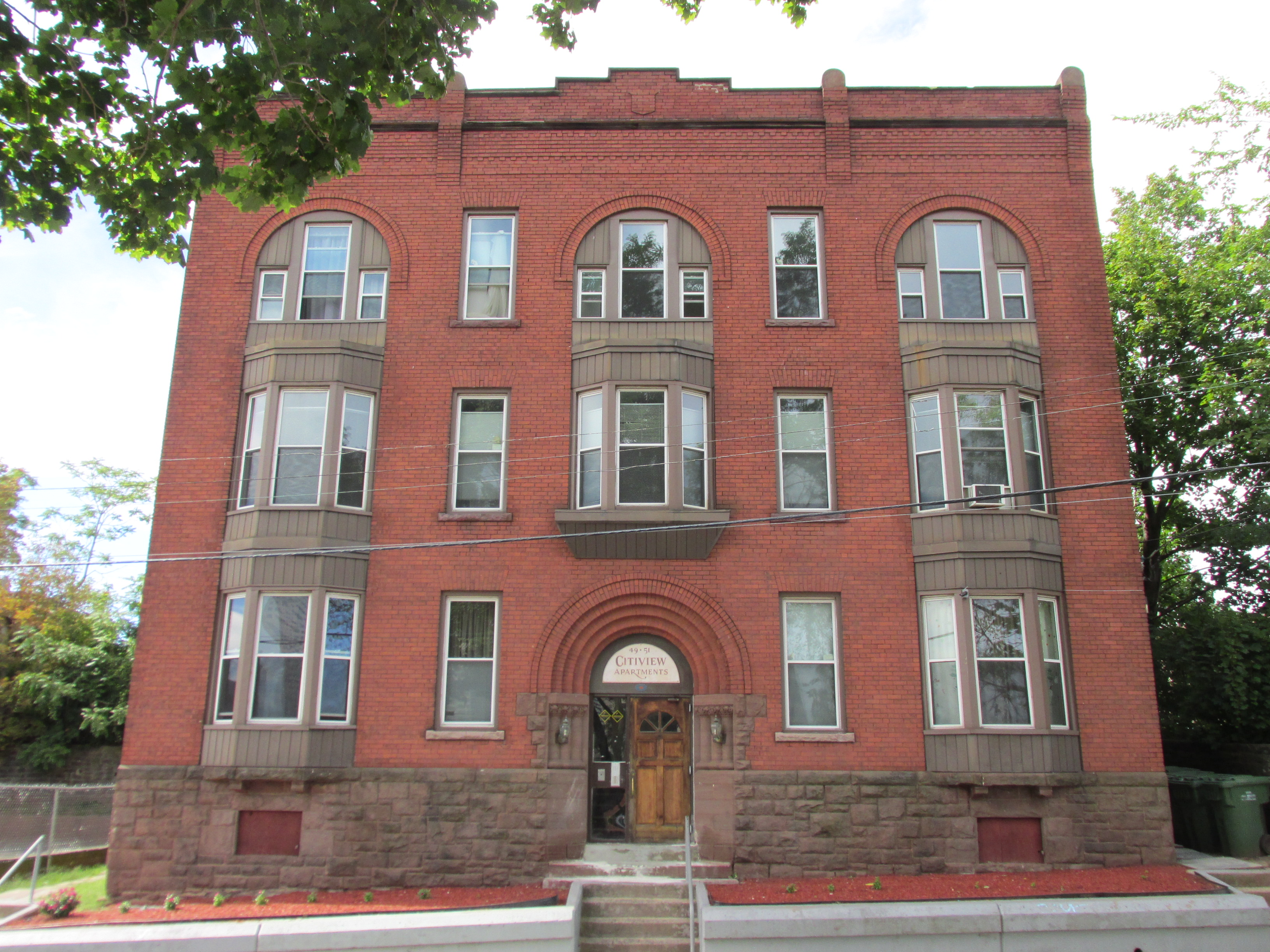

- Location within Connecticut Location within the United States
- Location: 49–51 Spring Street, Hartford, Connecticut
- Coordinates: 41.7696°N 72.6836°W
- Area: less than one acre
- Built: 1890
- Architectural style: Romanesque, Richardsonian Romanesque
- MPS: Asylum Hill MRA
- NRHP reference No.: 83001255
- Added to NRHP: March 31, 1983

49–51 Spring Street in Hartford, Connecticut is a significant local example of Richardsonian Romanesque residential architecture. It was built about 1890 for the locally prominent Allyn family. It was listed on the National Register of Historic Places in 1983.

== Description and history ==
The apartment building at 49–51 Spring Street is one of two residential apartment blocks standing on the west side of Spring Street between Garden and Myrtle Streets. The setting is now one of urban renewal, the buildings surrounded by parking lots on three sides, and I-84 passing not far to the East, separating the buildings from Downtown Hartford. This building is three stories in height, built out of brick with brownstone trim. It is five bays wide, with the entrance at the center, recessed under a Syrian arch. The outer bays and center bay are topped visually by large round-arch panels, with polygonal bay windows on the first and second floors of the outer bays, and on the second floor above the entrance in the center. The building's cornice has brick corbelling, with built-out bracket-like brickwork articulating the arched panels.

The building was constructed about 1890, on land belonging to Robert Allyn, a local real estate developer whose own house stood on the same lot to the north. Of the two six-unit apartment blocks built by Allyn (the other is at 39-41 Spring Street, built about five years earlier), it is the more architecturally interesting, probably drawing inspiration from the 1875–76 Cheney Building in Downtown Hartford, which is an H. H. Richardson design.

== See also ==
- National Register of Historic Places listings in Hartford, Connecticut
