= Smiths of Glastonbury =

The Smiths of Glastonbury were two generations of women—a mother and her five daughters—residing in Glastonbury, Connecticut, in the late 18th and 19th centuries who were early champions of education, abolition, and women's rights. Kimberly Mansion, their former home on Main Street, is now a designated National Historic Landmark, and the family as a whole was inducted into the Connecticut Women's Hall of Fame in 1994.

== The family ==
The mother of the family, Hannah Hadassah (Hickok) Smith (1767–1850), was married to a prosperous clergyman, Zephaniah Smith. Zephaniah left the ministry due to a religious dispute and became a farmer and lawyer in Glastonbury. Hannah was conversant in the classics and saw to it that her daughters were exceptionally well educated. The author of an early anti-slavery petition, she was an abolitionist who helped slaves escape through the Underground Railroad.

The five daughters were:

- Hancy Zephinia Smith (1787–1871), an active abolitionist
- Cyrinthia Sacretia Smith (1788–1864), a horticulturalist
- Laurilla Aleroyla Smith (1789–1837), a teacher at Catharine Beecher's seminary
- Julia Evelina Smith (1792–1886), a teacher at Emma Willard's school who became the first woman to translate the entire Bible from its original languages; a suffragist; and the author of a book, Abby Smith and Her Cows, about a suffrage-related tax battle with the Glastonbury authorities
- Abby Hadassah Smith (1797–1878), a public speaker on suffrage and a protagonist in the tax battle detailed in her sister Julia's book

Unusually for the period, four of the daughters did not marry, while the fifth (Julia) married only at the age of 87.

Glastonbury's middle school, Smith Middle School, is named after the family.

== See also ==
- Julia E. Smith Parker Translation
