= Jane Hamilton-Merritt =

Jane Hamilton-Merritt (born Mary Jane LaRowe) is a retired college professor, photojournalist, author, and animal rights and animal husbandry advocate. She resides in Redding, Connecticut. In 1999, she was inducted into the Connecticut Women's Hall of Fame. Some of her work has focused on breeding and raising Llamas and Alpaca.

== Early life, education, and teaching ==
Jane Hamilton-Merritt was born Mary Jane LaRowe in 1937 in Noble County, Indiana, not far from Fort Wayne. Her parents were Claude LaRowe, a farmer, and Alvada (Brown) LaRowe.

She attended Ball State University in Muncie, where she received both a B.A. and an M.A. degree. She went on to get a Ph.D. in Southeast Asia Studies at Union Institute in Cincinnati, Ohio.

Hamilton-Merritt was a professor at Southern Connecticut State University, where she taught writing and journalism for nearly two decades (1979–97) on a part-time basis. In 1991–92 she was a visiting faculty fellow at Yale University. In 1997, she retired from teaching at Southern Connecticut State University, to work full-time for the resettlement of a group of Hmong living in a compound near Bangkok, Thailand. She also raises llama and alpacas on her Connecticut farm, in her retirement.

== Raising alpacas and llamas ==
Hamilton-Merritt is an active member and officer in the Greater Appalachian Llama and Alpaca Association. She frequently shows her animals in Connecticut and New England events.

== Photojournalism and advocacy ==
Hamilton-Merritt went to Vietnam as a free-lance war correspondent, spending six years covering aspects of the Vietnam War, including the North Vietnamese invasion of Laos. Hamilton-Merritt is also known for the work she has done on behalf of the Laotian and Hmong people, who were U.S. allies in the Vietnam War before being largely forgotten in the aftermath. In 1980, she wrote an early story in the politically conservative newspaper Reader’s Digest on reported chemical and biological warfare in communist Laos under the Marxist government. She has worked as an adviser to several American school systems with large numbers of Hmong children. Beginning in the early 1990s, she worked with several non-profit organizations and non-governmental organizations seeking to stop forced repatriation of Hmong political refugees from camps in Thailand back to communist Laos, on the grounds that this puts them at great risk of execution or slavery.

In 1993, in cooperation with Indiana University Press (IUP), she published a book on the Hmong and Lao people, Tragic Mountains: The Hmong, the Americans, and the Secret War for Laos, 1942-1992.

For her work to help bring awareness about the Hmong people's situation and their recent history, Hamilton-Merritt has been nominated for the Nobel Peace Prize, which she did not receive. Mr. Burke Marshall, of Yale Law School, wrote in support of her nomination: “They (the Hmong) are a people who have been deeply damaged and wronged by history and by the actions of great nations...”

Hamilton-Merritt was one of the editors of Indiana University's Vietnam War Era Classics Series.

== Criticism ==
Hamilton-Merritt has been critical of Professor Alfred W. McCoy controversial writings about the Hmong people, General Vang Pao, Laos, and Southeast Asia during the period of North Vietnamese invasion of Laos. In return, Hamilton-Merritt's writings regarding Vang Pao and the Hmong have been criticized by McCoy.

== Buddhism ==
She wrote a fascinating account of her experiences of Theravadan Buddhist meditation undertaken in monasteries in Bangkok and Chiang Mai.

== Selected publications ==
Books

- Tragic Mountains: The Hmong, the Americans, and the Secret War for Laos, 1942-1992 (Indiana University Press, 1993)
- A Meditator's Diary: A Western Woman's Unique Experiences in Thailand's Monasteries (1976)

Articles

- "Gas Warfare in Laos: Communism's Drive to Annihilate a People" (Reader's Digest, October 1980, pp. 81–88)
- "Hmong and Yao: Mountain Peoples of Southeast Asia" (Survive, 1982)
- "The Killing Fields of Laos" (interview, Vietnam, December 1993, pp. 46–53)
- "General Giap's Laotian Nemesis" (Vietnam, June 1995, pp. 27–32)
