= Adrianne Baughns-Wallace =

American television journalist

- Born: Adrianne Eugene Thomas; 1944 (age 81–82)
- Education: University at Albany, SUNY Majored in communications
- Honours: Connecticut Women's Hall of Fame (2000)

Adrianne Baughns-Wallace (born in 1944) was a television journalist, the first African-American television anchor in New England, and a member of the Connecticut Women's Hall of Fame.

== Early years ==
Baughns-Wallace was born in The Bronx, New York, and raised in New York City. She was educated at St. Colombo School, Washington Irving School, and University at Albany, SUNY, where she majored in communications. Before becoming a broadcast journalist, she worked for a telephone company, an automobile agency, and an airline. She also served as a pharmacy specialist in the Air Force.

== Career ==
=== Television ===
Baughns-Wallace began working in television in Albany, New York, in 1973. In August 1974, she left WAST in Albany and joined WFSB in Hartford, Connecticut. Her initial work at WFSB included writing and presenting the 7:30 a.m. News Sign and being co-anchor of its noon Eyewitness News broadcast. In October 1978, Baughns was named co-anchor of WFSB's 6 p.m. Eyewitness News broadcast, becoming the first female anchor of an evening newscast in Connecticut. She left WFSB in June 1982 to launch a TV production company of her own. The departure was a lifestyle choice. "I really needed to define for myself what my son needed and what I needed for our lives," Baughns-Wallace said.

After leaving WFSB, in addition to being an independent TV producer, Baughns-Wallace was the host of Essence, a program for black women that was broadcast on WPIX in New York City. In 1983, Baughns-Wallace joined the staff of WTNH in New Haven, Connecticut, tasked with helping to begin Newscope, a program that blended local stories with nationally syndicated material.

=== Operation Fuel ===
In the late 1980s, Baughns-Wallace became director of Operation Fuel (OF), a nonprofit, private institution. OF, a program of the Christian Conference of Connecticut, provides funds (via a checkoff program of Connecticut Light & Power Company) to help the poor, elderly, and disabled to pay their utility bills. A 1996 article in the Hartford Courant's Sunday magazine commented, "... she's found her mission and purpose in life ..."

=== State government ===
In 2001, Baughns-Wallace was director of financial education for the Connecticut treasurer's office. Her job entailed teaching citizens of Connecticut about responsible financial planning. A newspaper article described her as "part facilitator, part advocate and part cheerleader."

== Personal life ==
Baughns-Wallace is divorced from her first husband and has a son. Her second husband was Lenzy Wallace, a manager of diversity and change at ITT Hartford, who died in 2021.

== Recognition ==
In 2000, Baughns-Wallace was inducted into the Connecticut Women's Hall of Fame, "an honor given to those who have broken the barriers for women in a job, doing most of their work while in Connecticut." Her credentials included being the first African-American TV anchor in New England and the first female TV anchor in Connecticut. She also received the National Council of Negro Women's Distinguished Service Award.
