= Rachel Taylor Milton =

American educator and activist

- Born: May 19, 1901; Hartford, Connecticut, US
- Died: July 4, 1995 (aged 94); Simsbury, Connecticut, US
- Education: Hartford Seminary
- Organization: Urban League of Hartford
- Awards: Connecticut Women's Hall of Fame inductee

Rachel Taylor Milton (1901–1995) was an American educator, community activist, and co-founder of the Urban League of Hartford, Connecticut. The first African American woman to graduate from Hartford Seminary, Milton was inducted into the Connecticut Women's Hall of Fame in 1994.

== Education and career ==
Milton was born in Hartford on May 19, 1901, to parents John O. and Mary Epps Taylor. She was educated in the city's public schools and at Hartford Seminary. Her professional career began in 1924. She served as executive director of YMCA chapters in Pittsburgh, Omaha, Chicago, and Nashville, desegregating the YMCA camps in Pittsburgh and Omaha. Concurrently, she studied at the University of Pittsburgh, Columbia University School of Social Work, University of Chicago, George Williams College, and Swarthmore College. Milton served as associate dean of women at Fisk University from 1953 to 1955. In 1958, she served as director of the first Interracial Senior Citizens Center of the Chicago Housing Authority.

Milton returned to Hartford in 1959, where she worked for the State Bureau for Vocational Rehabilitation and became a community organizer. In 1962, she led a group that organized a community fundraising drive that raised $90,000 to launch a National Urban League affiliate chapter in Hartford in 1964. She served on its board of directors and as board secretary. The Urban League of Greater Hartford continues to offer community services in the areas of adult education, youth development, community health, workforce development and training, and home ownership and neighborhood improvement. In 1979, Milton chaired the committee that got the Union Baptist Church listed on the National Register of Historic Places.

In addition to her Urban League contributions, Milton organized the Junior Council of the National Council of Negro Women. In 1968, she received B'nai B'rith’s Woman of the Year Award. She was a charter member of the Hartford chapter of the National Association of Negro Business and Professional Women's Clubs, the Mayor's Committee on Minority Problems, the Regional Council of the Greater Hartford Community College, the Women's Auxiliary of the Hartford Symphony Orchestra, the Delta Sigma Theta sorority, the NAACP, and the Harriet Beecher Stowe Foundation. She received honors from the Alumni Association of the Hartford Seminary Foundation, the Connecticut Historical Society, the West Indian Celebration Committee, and other organizations.

== Personal life ==
Born Rachel Taylor, she married Charles H. Milton, assistant pastor of Mount Calvary Baptist Church in Hartford. The couple had no issue.

Rachel Milton died at a convalescent home in Simsbury, Connecticut, on July 4, 1995, at the age of 94.
