= Dotha Bushnell Hillyer =

American philanthropist (1843–1932)

Dotha Bushnell Hillyer (1843 – 1932) was an American philanthropist.

The youngest daughter of Reverend Horace Bushnell and Mary Apthorpe, Dotha Bushnell was born in Hartford. In 1879, she married Appleton Robbins Hillyer.

With her husband, she helped establish the West Hartford Science Museum, now The Children's Museum, and the Hillyer YMCA building, and later Hillyer College at the University of Hartford.

She also built the Horace Bushnell Memorial Hall, and later The Bushnell Center for the Performing Arts, in honor of her father. She saw the hall as a gathering place for the community. Hillyer had opened an investment account with $800,000 to finance the project; the account grew to $2.5 million. She was fortunate enough to withdraw the money just before Wall Street crash of 1929. The hall opened in January 1930.

Hillyer was too ill to attend the opening of the Horace Bushnell Memorial Hall in 1930 and died two years later.

In 2003, she was inducted into the Connecticut Women's Hall of Fame.
