= Martha Parsons =

Martha Parsons (December 6, 1869 – March 19, 1965) was an American businesswoman who worked for Landers, Frary & Clark, eventually becoming executive secretary. She was inducted into the Connecticut Women's Hall of Fame in 2010.

== Biography ==
Parsons was born on December 6, 1869, to John and Juliette Allen Parsons. Her father was a prosperous merchant who died in 1880. Later she graduated from Enfield High School. One of the first to learn Gregg shorthand, Parsons took a job with Morgan Envelope Company, earning $10-$12 a week as a stenographer.

In 1893, she was hired by Landers, Frary & Clark, based in New Britain, Connecticut. By 1912, she was the company's executive secretary, becoming the "first female business executive in Connecticut's history to earn her position on the basis of merit." Parsons signed her mail "M. A. Parsons" so that people she was interacting with would not know that she was a woman. In 1917, she founded the universal war relief association at Landers.

Martha Parsons held her position at Landers, Frary & Clark until her retirement in 1919. She then moved to New Hartford, Connecticut in order to live with her sisters Julia and Mary. In 1928, Parsons hired Ethel Rebecca Twining to work in the house. The two women developed a strong friendship, and Twining was even included in Parsons' will, until Twinning died.

Parsons died in 1965, leaving her house to the local historical society. Her home, built in 1782 by John Meacham, is now a site on the Connecticut Women's Heritage Trail. The house was originally called Sycamore Hall, but was renamed Parsons House after Martha.
