= Abby Hadassah Smith =

American suffragist (1797–1879)

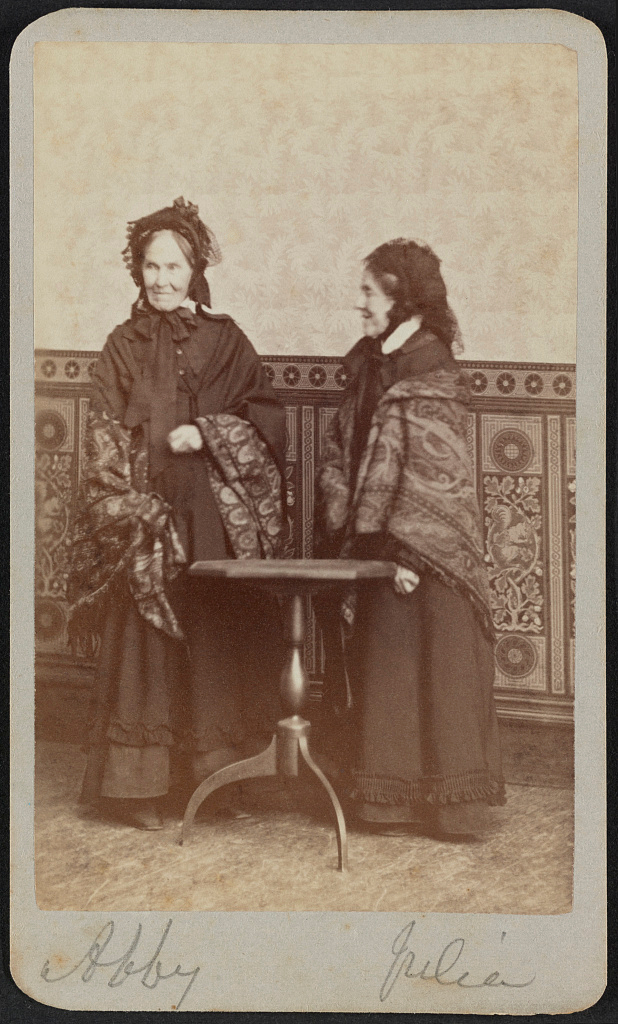
- Abby Hadassah Smith (right) and her sister Julia Evelina Smith (left)
- Born: June 1, 1797; Glastonbury
- Died: July 23, 1879 (aged 82)
- Occupation: Suffragist
- Relatives: Julia Evelina Smith

Abby Hadassah Smith (June 1, 1797 – July 23, 1879) was an early American suffragist who campaigned for property and voting rights from Glastonbury, Connecticut. She was a subject of the book Abby Smith and Her Cows in which her sister Julia Evelina Smith told the story of a tax resistance struggle they undertook in the suffrage cause.

== Family background ==
Born in 1797, Smith was the youngest of five daughters of Hannah Hadassah (Hickock) Smith and Zephaniah Hollister Smith, a Nonconformist clergyman turned farmer.

Smith's mother authored one of the earliest anti-slavery petitions, presented to the United States Congress by John Quincy Adams. The family was united in support of her advocacy of education, abolition and women's rights. At Hannah's instigation, the family house on Main Street, Kimberly Mansion, was a stop on the Connecticut Freedom Trail; it is now a designated National Historic Landmark.

The Smiths of Glastonbury—namely, Smith, her sisters, and her mother—were inducted wholesale into the Connecticut Women's Hall of Fame in 1994.

== Suffrage-related activism ==
Smith was educated at Emma Willard’s Seminary in Troy, New York and was known to have kept a diary in both French and Latin. In 1869, Smith and her sister, Julia, attended a woman’s suffrage meeting in Hartford, Connecticut. In 1872, the town of Glastonbury attempted to raise taxes on the Smith sisters and two other widows in town. None of their male neighbors’ taxes had risen, so the sisters refused to pay the taxes without having been granted a right to vote in town meetings. The sister’s plight was soon published in the Springfield, Massachusetts newspaper, The Republican, and newspapers across the country quickly picked up on the story.

In 1873, Smith traveled to New York City to attend the first meeting of the Association for the Advancement of Women, and a month later she protested taxation of disenfranchised women. In January 1874, seven of her cows were seized and sold for taxes. When she protested this seizure of property, 15 acres of pastureland was also seized, illegally, for delinquent taxes. The sisters took the town to court and ultimately won their case. In The Woman's Bible, Elizabeth Cady Stanton noted that "Abby Smith's quaint, simple speeches attracted attention...and from that time on their fame grew apace."

== See also ==
- Smiths of Glastonbury
