= Edythe J. Gaines =

American educator (1922–2006)

- Born: Edythe Pauline Jones; September 6, 1922; Asheville, North Carolina
- Died: March 23, 2006 (aged 83); Hartford, Connecticut
- Occupation: Educator
- Known for: First African American and first woman to serve as a school superintendent in Connecticut

Edythe J. Gaines (September 6, 1922 – March 23, 2006) was an American educator. She was the first African American and first woman to serve as a school superintendent in Connecticut. She was inducted into the Connecticut Women's Hall of Fame in 1996.

== Early life and education ==
Edythe Pauline Jones was born in Asheville, North Carolina, in 1922, the daughter of Jacob Jones, an Episcopal clergyman, and teacher Jennie Dillard Jones. She was raised in New York City after her father's death. Jones attended Hunter College as an undergraduate, earning her bachelor's degree in history and political science in 1944. She pursued further study at New York University, earning a master's degree in 1947, and much later an Ed.D. from Harvard University in 1969.

== Career ==
Gaines taught in the New York City public schools. In 1964, she became the second African American principal at a school in the district, and first to head a secondary school. She became an assistant superintendent of schools in 1967, and in 1973 the New York Board of Education appointed Gaines as Executive Director of the Office of Educational Planning and Support.

In 1972, her brother Frederick D. Jones, New York City regional director of the NAACP and founder of Edu-Force, a grading and testing service, was killed in his Bronx apartment. There was an investigation of Gaines' involvement with her late brother's testing service, but she was cleared of any ulterior motives.

From 1975 to 1978, Gaines served as superintendent of the Hartford city public schools, the first African American to hold that position, and the first woman to be a superintendent in a Connecticut school district. During her superintendency, she was also elected to be a director of the Hartford National Bank and Trust. She was listed among the "Highest Paid Black Public Officials" by Ebony magazine in 1978.

In 1979, Gaines joined Connecticut's State Department of Public Utility Control as a commissioner. She was named to the Board of Governors of Higher Education in 1992, and to the Connecticut State Board of Education in 1995. She was a trustee of Montclair State University from 1968 to 1975.

She was inducted into the Connecticut Women's Hall of Fame in 1996.

== Personal life ==
Edythe Jones married Albert Denis Gaines, an engineer, in 1941. They had two sons together. Albert Gaines died in 1995.

Gaines remained active in the Episcopal church during her adult life, as chair of the Commission on Ministry for the Episcopal Diocese of Connecticut, and as the head of St. Monica's Development Corporation's Second Century Plan for elderly housing in the city.

She died in 2006, at age 83, in Hartford, Connecticut.

An Edythe J. Gaines Award for Inclusive Education is given annually by the Connecticut Commission on Human Rights and Opportunities.
