= Betty Tianti =

American trade union leader

- Born: Betty Mathieu; August 17, 1929; Killingly, Connecticut, U.S.
- Died: May 16, 1994 (age 64); Alexandria, Virginia, U.S.
- Occupation: Labor leader

Betty L. Mathieu Tianti (August 17, 1929 – May 16, 1994) was an American trade union leader. She was elected president of the AFL–CIO union federation in Connecticut in 1985, and was the first woman in the United States to head a state labor federation. She was also the first woman to serve as state labor commissioner of Connecticut.

== Early life and education ==
Tianti was a native of Killingly, Connecticut, the daughter of Theodell Mathieu and Evelyn St. John Mathieu. Both of her parents were textile mill workers; they divorced in the 1930s, and Evelyn Mathieu raised their four children. She graduated from Plainfield High School in 1946, and attended the University of Connecticut and the University of Massachusetts.

== Career ==
Tianti started her career at the American Thread Company factory in Willimantic, Connecticut in 1956. She later became president of her local union, and from 1962 to 1970 was a union organizer in New England and in the Southern United States. She became the deputy director of the Textile Workers Union of America's Committee on Political Education (COPE), which was the union's political organizing and contributing arm.

From 1970 to 1974, Tianti was an assistant agent for the Connecticut State Board of Labor Relations, and then served as COPE director for the state AFL-CIO. She became the labor federation's secretary-treasurer in 1979.

When the AFL-CIO's Connecticut president John Driscoll retired in 1985, Tianti was elected to succeed him, making her the first woman in the United States to be elected as head of a state labor federation. In 1988, Governor William O'Neill appointed her as the state's first female labor commissioner. "When you go into trade unionism, you don't go into it halfway," she told The New York Times in 1987. She retired from her state position for health reasons in 1990.

== Personal life and legacy ==
Mathieu married Tianti; they had a daughter Cynthia, and later divorced. She was a close friend to Connecticut legislator Audrey P. Beck. Tianti died of emphysema in 1994 at the age of 64, in Alexandria, Virginia. Tianti was inducted into the Connecticut Women's Hall of Fame three days after she died.
