= Eleazer Kimberly =

American politician

Eleazer Kimberly (November 17, 1639 – February 3, 1709) was the sixth Secretary of the State of Connecticut.

Born in New Haven, Connecticut, to Thomas Kimberly and Alice Atwood of England, Kimberly was reportedly the first male child born in New Haven. He was a schoolmaster in Wethersfield from 1661 to 1689. In the 1690s, he held several positions in Glastonbury, including Commissioner and Town Clerk. Kimberly served as Secretary of Connecticut from 1696 until his death in 1709. He was "one of the best penmen of his time, as attested by the town and colony records."

Kimberly was married three times and had five children. He built the Kimberly Mansion in the early 18th century.

Kimberly was also a minor character in the 1958 children's historical novel, The Witch of Blackbird Pond.
