= Department Store Historic District =

Historic district in Connecticut, United States

- U.S. National Register of Historic Places
- U.S. Historic district
- Cheney Building (2026)

- Location within Connecticut Location within the United States
- Location: 884--956 Main Street and 36 Talcott Street, Hartford, Connecticut
- Coordinates: 41°46′5″N 72°40′22″W
- Area: 5 acres (2.0 ha)
- Built: 1876
- Architect: Isaac A. Allen Jr.; Henry Hobson Richardson; Cass Gilbert
- Architectural style: Classical Revival, Renaissance, Romanesque
- MPS: Hartford Downtown MRA
- NRHP reference No.: 95000284
- Added to NRHP: March 23, 1995

The Department Store Historic District is a historic district in the Downtown Hartford neighborhood of the city of Hartford, Connecticut, United States.

It is a 5-acre (2.0 ha) area that, in 1995, included three contributing buildings, one other contributing structure, and one contributing object. It includes a building that is separately listed on the NRHP: the Cheney Building which is also known as the Brown Thomson Building.

The district is significant because of the important economic role of the three department stores in the district.

== G. Fox Building ==
The G. Fox & Co. building at 960 Main Street is a neoclassical structure, designed by Cass Gilbert and built in 1918. Besides the department store itself, a warehouse and a bridge attaching the store to the warehouse are listed as contributing properties to the district.

In 1935, a streamlined Art Deco canopy was added over the storefronts, but this addition in itself is historic as one of Hartford's best expressions of the style. Each Christmastime, an elaborate display would be constructed atop the canopy, featuring scale replicas of famous Connecticut buildings and Christmas decoration. It drew shoppers from throughout the state.

== Brown Thomson Building ==
The Brown Thomson Building (originally the Cheney Building) was designed by Henry Hobson Richardson, in the Richardsonian Romanesque style which he created and built in 1877. At one time, the G. Fox & Co. department store extended into this building.

== Sage-Allen Building ==
The Sage-Allen flagship store building was built in 1898 and designed by architect Isaac A. Allen Jr. It is located at 884-902 Main Street, near Talcott Street.

The building has been restored and now contains both retail space and luxury apartments. As part of the restoration project, an adjacent 1960s building was given a new historically sensitive façade to make it more compatible with its neighbor.

The store was known for the free-standing 'Sage-Allen' sidewalk clock, a local landmark built in 1899, that was located on the Main Street sidewalk in front of the store until the clock was damaged in a windstorm in 1992. The clock was later repaired and erected on another sidewalk in the city. Its importance as a Main Street landmark was known to the re-developers of the Sage-Allen building, and a deal was struck to return the clock to its traditional place. A clock specialist was called upon to restart the clock after its return to Main Street in the summer of 2007.

== See also ==
- National Register of Historic Places listings in Hartford, Connecticut
