= Kica Matos =

Puerto Rican lawyer

Kica Matos (born 1966 in Puerto Rico) is a Puerto Rican lawyer, community organizer, and immigrant rights advocate who identifies as Afro-boricua. She is the president of the National Immigration Law Center (NILC) and the Immigrant Justice Fund (IJF). She is also a Distinguished Practitioner at Yale University's Brady Johnson Program in Grand Strategy. In 2026, Matos was named to the Time 100 list of the most influential people in the world. The profile, written by activist Jess Morales Rocketto, cited Matos's decades of work on behalf of people on death row, working-class families, and immigrants, and noted her challenges to the Trump administration on issues including ICE agents wearing face coverings during enforcement operations and the rights of unaccompanied migrant children. The New Haven Independent reported that Matos had been a leading figure in opposition to the administration's immigration policies and mass deportations, and had participated in a "No Kings" rally on the New Haven Green in October 2025.

== Early life and education ==
Matos was born in Puerto Rico in 1966 and grew up between Puerto Rico, Trinidad and Tobago, and the Fiji Islands. She earned a B.A. from Victoria University of Wellington in New Zealand, an M.A. in political science from The New School, and a J.D. from Cornell Law School.

== Career ==
=== Early career ===
Matos began her career in community organizing and human rights advocacy. She worked for the NAACP Legal Defense and Educational Fund for four years, organizing with Black communities in the American South. She then became an assistant federal defender in Philadelphia, where she represented death row inmates in state and federal courts.

=== JUNTA for Progressive Action ===
In 2002, Matos became the first woman to serve as executive director of JUNTA for Progressive Action, New Haven's oldest Latino advocacy organization. During her tenure, she expanded after-school and summer programs, created English language learning and legal assistance services, and added driver's education classes. The John F. Kennedy Library recognized her work at JUNTA with the New Frontier Award in 2005.

=== Deputy Mayor of New Haven ===
In 2007, Matos was appointed deputy mayor for community services in New Haven under Mayor John DeStefano. She helped create the Elm City Resident ID Card, a municipal identification card program that allowed all city residents, including undocumented immigrants, to obtain government-issued identification. She also advocated for "Ban the Box" legislation in the city. About 70 U.S. municipalities have since created similar ID programs.

=== Philanthropy and Advocacy ===
After serving as deputy mayor, Matos headed the U.S. Reconciliation and Human Rights Program at Atlantic Philanthropies. She then served as director of Immigrant Rights and Racial Justice at the Center for Community Change, where she coordinated the Fair Immigration Reform Movement, a national network of immigrant rights organizations.

=== National Immigration Law Center ===
After serving as vice president of initiatives at the Vera Institute of Justice, Matos joined the National Immigration Law Center and the Immigrant Justice Fund as executive vice president of programs and strategy in January 2023, and was appointed president in 2024. As president, she led the organization's legal and policy challenges to the Trump administration's immigration enforcement actions, including litigation over the treatment of unaccompanied migrant children and ICE operational practices. In 2024, she received the Puffin Prize for Creative Citizenship.

== Personal life ==
Matos is married to Henry Fernandez, executive director of LEAP in New Haven. They have one son. She is involved in the bomba community; bomba musicians and dancers from groups including Movimiento Cultural Afro-Continental and Bomba Works NYC have performed at events in her honor.

== Awards and recognition ==
New Frontier Award, John F. Kennedy Library (2005) Honorary doctorate, Albertus Magnus College (2017) Honorary doctorate, University of New Haven (2019) Connecticut Women's Hall of Fame inductee (2021) Puffin Prize for Creative Citizenship (2024) Time 100 Most Influential People (2026)
