= Helen L. Smits =

American physician (born 1937)

Helen L. Smits (born 1937) was a health policy influencer and advocate in the United States, and lent her voice to several healthcare initiatives abroad. Most notably, she was a recipient of the Fulbright scholarship and served under the Carter and Clinton administrations. She also held positions in government organizations including the National Institutes of Health (NIH) and Healthcare Financing Administration.

== Childhood and education ==
Helen L. Smits was born to Ted Smits, who was a freelance sports writer and editor, and Anna Mary Wells, who was an associate professor of English, in 1937 in Long Beach, California. After graduating from high school, Smits went on to earn a Bachelor of Arts degree from Swarthmore College in Pennsylvania. She then attended Yale University, where she obtained her Master's of Art with an emphasis in English, and eventually returned to complete her Medical Degree at the Yale School of Medicine. Smits was one of only eight women in her graduating class.

== Career ==
After graduating medical school, Helen L. Smits began her residency at the hospital at University of Pennsylvania, eventually becoming the chief resident in 1971. In the years following, she was employed as the associate administrator at this hospital and faculty member at the Wharton School.

In 1977, under the President Jimmy Carter administration, Smits was elected as the Director of the Health Standards and Quality Bureau at the Healthcare Financing Administration (now known as the Centers for Medicare & Medicaid Services).

In 1981, Smits and her family relocated to Connecticut. She was a faculty member at the Yale School of Public Health before becoming the Director of John Dempsey Hospital at the University of Connecticut for seven years. Additionally, from 1991 to 1993 she was a member of the Board of Regents of the American College of Physicians, and the Board of Commissioners of the Joint Commission on Accreditation of Healthcare Organizations.

Later in 1993, Smits was commissioned by President Bill Clinton to serve as the Deputy Administrator and Chief Medical Officer of the Healthcare Financing Administration. Her work included supervision of the review of the Clinical Center at the National Institutes of Health (NIH). At this time, Smits was also working alongside Hillary Clinton to reform healthcare policies. Following her review at the NIH, Smits was appointed to the Clinical Center's Board of Governors, and in 1997, she was elected to the Institute of Medicine.

In 2002, Smits received the Fulbright Fellowship, and moved to Maputo, Mozambique to teach at the Department of Community Medicine at Eduardo Mondlane University. Furthermore, Smits began her research and development of HIV/AIDS prevention with the William J. Clinton Presidential Foundation and the Ministry of Health. In the following year, Smits served as the Vice Chair of the President's Emergency Plan for AIDS Relief (PEPFAR). While she was employed as the Vice Chair, the United States Congress passed the “United States Leadership against HIV/AIDS, Tuberculosis, and Malaria Act” which increased the allocation of antiretroviral treatment and the development of HIV/AIDS research and testing.

Currently, Smits is now retired and resides in Old Saybrook, Connecticut with her husband, but is still a senior consultant to the Doris Duke Charitable Foundation's African Health Initiative.

== Research ==
Thought her career, Smits authored and contributed her intellect to over a dozen academic papers about healthcare and medicine. In 1967, Smits published her first study in The Yale Journal of Biology and Medicine regarding a study of the ultrastructure of the embryonic rabbit lung, she received her medical degree in the same year. Smits went on to publish another paper in 1981 comparing the practices of new and established physicians. Her study concluded that experienced physicians were more likely to accept medicare and medicaid in relation to their new counterparts. On the other hand, the newer physicians billed more and sometimes charged slightly higher prices for care and procedures. In 1984, Smits co-authored a paper in the Medicare and Medicaid Research Review warning against a switch diagnosis-related group payment systems. Smits cited several weaknesses including inaccurate medical billing and that the system furthered the false idea that increased sickness always correlates with higher costs. Smits also spent a notable amount of time writing on issues within geriatric medicine including Medicaid, nursing homes, and health policy affecting the elderly. In her last known publication in 1995, Commentary on Hospitals & Nursing Homes. New Insight into the Plight of 'Dual Eligibles' she urges those in healthcare policy and the nursing home industry to "know as much as possible about the actual users of nursing homes and we need to look at ways to offer them care that is both cost effective and high quality." She also warns that while some may be quick to want to implement new policy that "changing the system in the wrong way will lead to poorer care and escalating costs."

== Accomplishments and awards ==
In 2009, Helen L. Smits was inducted into the Connecticut Women's Hall of Fame.
