= Julia Evelina Smith =

American suffragist and Bible translator (1792–1886)

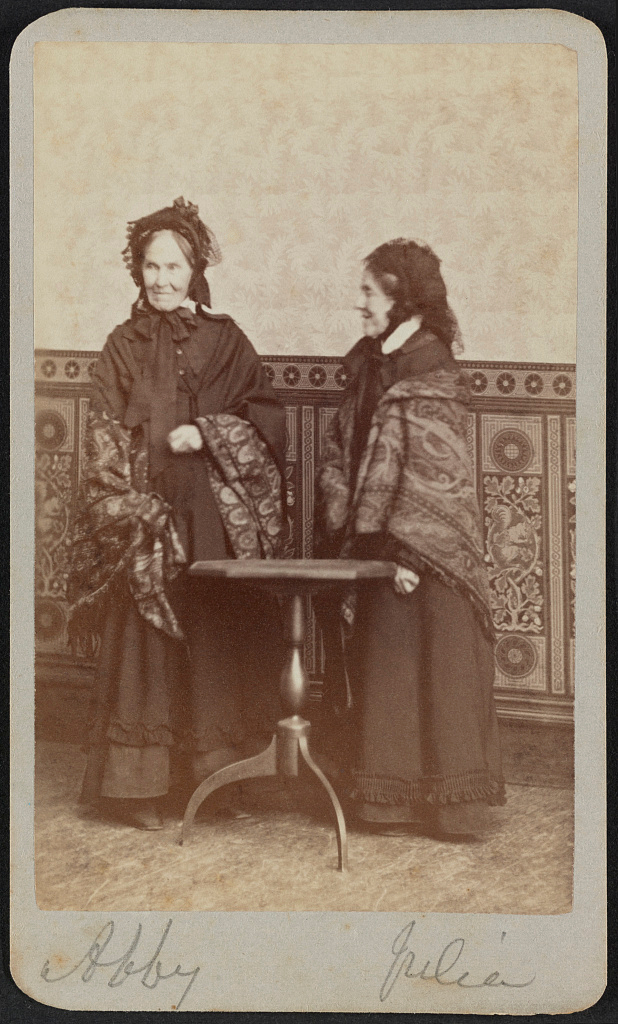
- Julia Evelina Smith (left) with her sister Abby Hadassah Smith (right)
- Born: May 27, 1792
- Died: March 6, 1886 (aged 93)
- Occupation: Translator; suffragist
- Relatives: Abby Hadassah Smith

Julia Evelina Smith (May 27, 1792 – March 6, 1886) was an American women's suffrage activist who was the first woman to translate the Bible from its original languages into English. She was also the author of the book Abby Smith and Her Cows, which told the story of her and her sister Abby Hadassah Smith's tax resistance struggle in the suffrage cause while the two were living at Kimberly Mansion in Connecticut.

== Biography ==
Smith was born into a large family of women, the Smiths of Glastonbury, who were active in championing women's education, abolition, and women's suffrage. The family as a whole was inducted into the Connecticut Women's Hall of Fame in 1994. She was the fourth of five daughters of Hannah Hadassah (Hickok) Smith (1767–1850) and Zephaniah Smith, a prosperous Nonconformist clergyman turned farmer in Glastonbury, Connecticut. She was educated at the Troy Female Seminary.

Smith married late in life. At the age of 87, she wed Amos Parker of New Hampshire, a widower.

== Publications ==
=== Bible translation ===
Smith was well educated, with a working knowledge of Latin, Greek and Hebrew. Having read the Bible in its original languages, she decided to undertake her own translation, with an emphasis on literalism. After eight years of work, she completed the translation in 1855, but it did not see print for another two decades. Smith's The Holy Bible: Containing the Old and New Testaments; Translated Literally from the Original Tongues was finally published in 1876. Although Smith's determined literalism made for choppy reading, hers was the only contemporary English translation from the original languages available to English-speaking readers until publication of the British Revised Version beginning in 1881. It was also the first complete Bible translation by a woman.

=== Abby Smith and Her Cows ===
In 1872, the town of Glastonbury attempted to raise taxes on the two surviving Smith sisters, Julia and Abby, as well as on two other widows in town. The sisters refused to pay the taxes on the grounds that they had no right to vote in town meetings, arguing that the tax levy amounted to the same kind of unfair taxation without representation that had helped to spark the American Revolution. Spearheaded by the youngest sister, Abby, the sisters’ revolt was picked up first by a Massachusetts newspaper, The Republican, and soon spread to newspapers across the country. The case was complicated by corruption and malfeasance on the part of the town's tax collector, who not only illegally seized the sisters's land but had made a secret deal to sell some of the best acreage to a covetous neighbor. The sisters ultimately took the town to court and won their case. Subsequently, Smith detailed the entire dispute in an 1877 book entitled Abby Smith and Her Cows that includes clippings from many of the newspapers that had covered the story.
