= Isabelle M. Kelley =

American social worker (1917–1997)

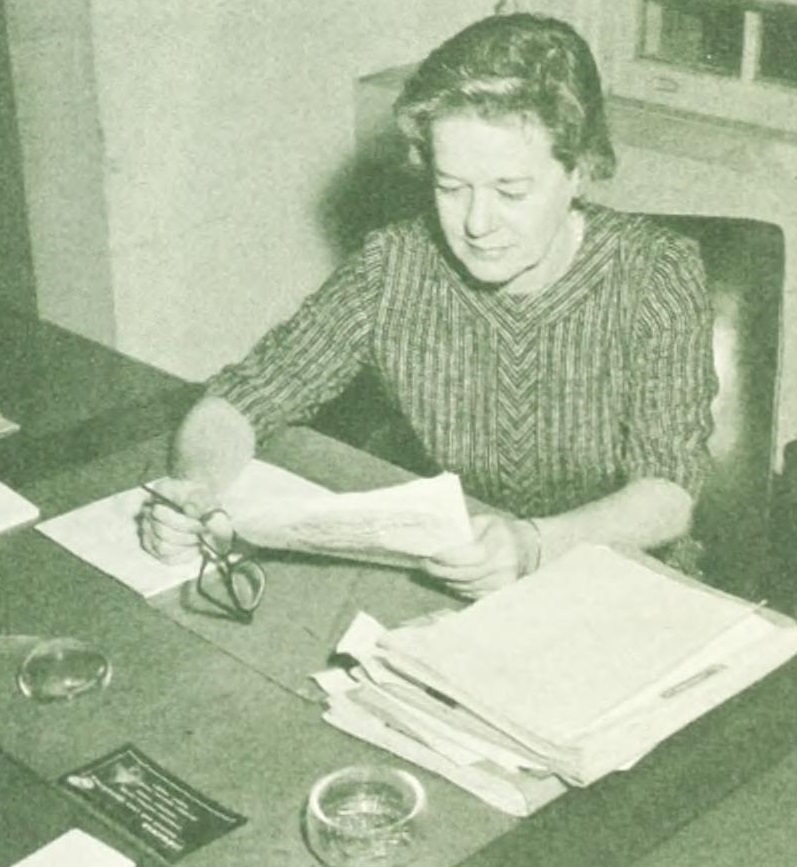
- Born: July 27, 1917; Ellington, Connecticut
- Died: November 29, 1997 (aged 80); Bethesda, Maryland
- Occupation: Social Worker
- Years active: 1940–1973
- Known for: architect of the food stamp program

Isabelle M. Kelley (27 July 1917 – 29 November 1997) was an American social worker who was the primary architect of the Federal Food Stamp Program. When she was appointed to be the director of the Division which oversaw the Food Stamp Program for the US Department of Agriculture (USDA), she became the first woman to run a national social program or lead any Division of a federal agency. She has been inducted into the Connecticut Women's Hall of Fame and the USDA’s Hall of Heroes.

== Early life and education ==
Isabelle M. Kelley was born on July 27, 1917, in Ellington, Connecticut, to Hannah (née O'Connell) and Thomas W. Kelley, but her family soon moved to Simsbury where her parent ran an inn. She completed her secondary schooling there then enrolled in Agricultural Economics, at the University of Connecticut graduating in 1938 (the first woman to do so in the subject) and went on to attain a master's degree in food economics from Iowa State University.

== Career ==
In 1940, as soon as she graduated, Kelley began working for the USDA. She began studying trends in consumer purchasing and family nutrition. She was one of the first to understand the connection between health and cognition and pushed forward the Penny Milk Program. The program gave milk to school children for one penny and Kelley received the USDA’s Superior Honor Award for her administration of the initiative. In 1946, she helped launch the National School Lunch Program.

In 1961, President Kennedy asked her to participate in a task force to investigate ending hunger and distribution of the food supply. Initially, she ran a pilot program in eight of the most poverty-effected counties in the US and studied their nutritional needs as well as the impact on local retailers of instituting a coupon-based program. The following year, the program was expanded into 18 states. The program continued under President Johnson toward a permanent government program.

As part of the commission's work, she became the primary author of the Food Stamp Act of 1964. The USDA appointed her in 1964 to be the first Director of the administrative division which oversaw the program, making her the first woman who had directed a national social program or led any Division of a federal agency. The Food Stamp programme was supporting six million Americans withitn five years of its foundation.

Kelley retired in 1973, but continued to advise on policies and programs of the USDA. Beginning in 1974, she worked for a year and a half at the Graduate School of Georgetown University. In 1987, she was interviewed in the memoir program of Radcliffe College, as one of the thirty-eight women participants, who had been former employees of the federal government.

Kelley died on November 29, 1997, in Bethesda, Maryland.

== Commemoration ==
In 2011, she was posthumously inducted into the Connecticut Women's Hall of Fame and that same year was brought into the USDA’s Hall of Heroes. In January 2019, Kelley was featured in the New York Times Overlooked series obituaries on remarkable people whose deaths initially went unreported in newspaper.
