= Ruth A. Lucas =

US Air Force officer (1920–2013)

Ruth Alice Lucas
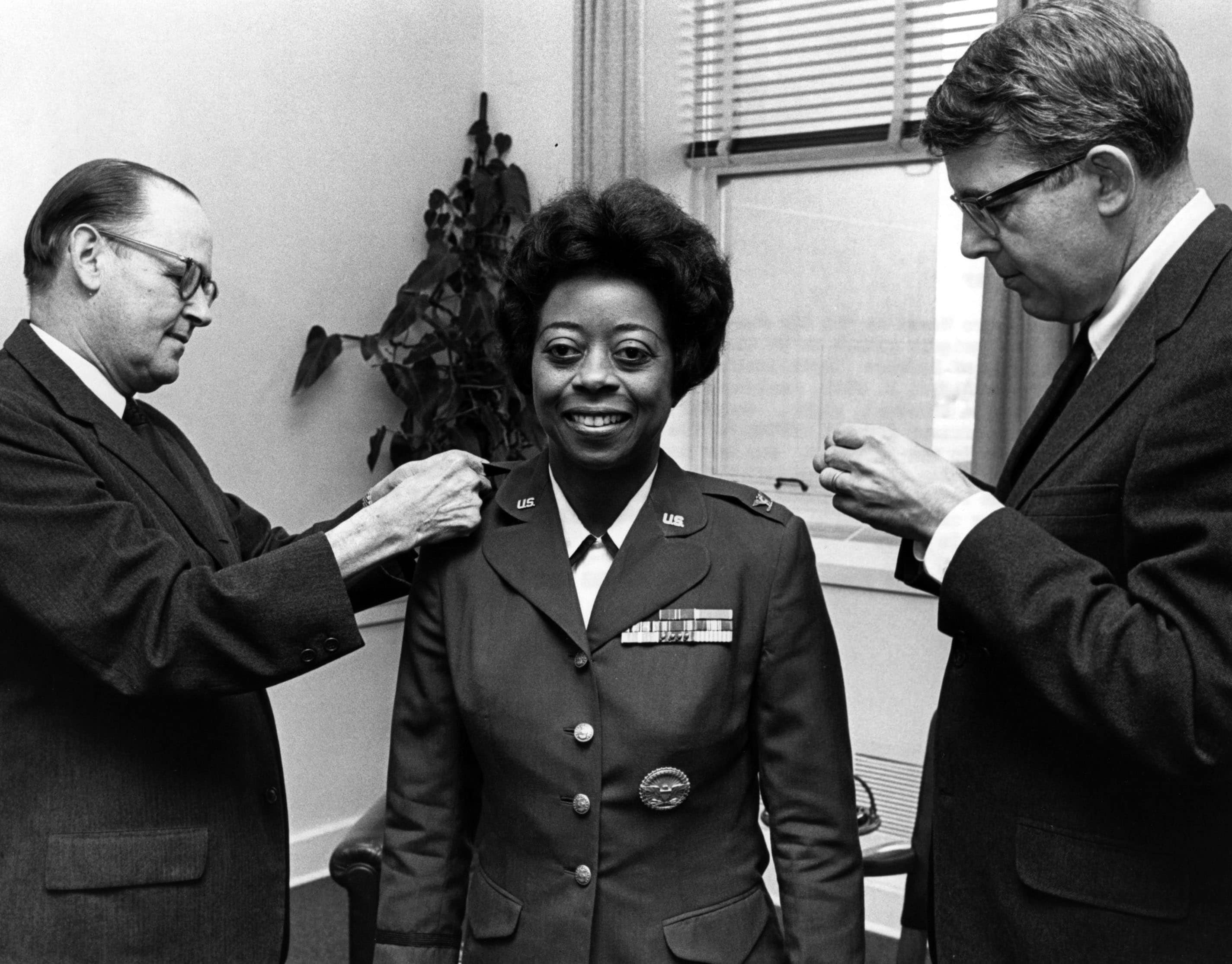
- Col. Lucas is seen at a ceremony in which she was promoted to colonel in 1968.
- Born: November 28, 1920; Stamford, Connecticut, US
- Died: March 23, 2013 (aged 92) Washington, D.C., US
- Buried: Arlington National Cemetery
- Allegiance: United States
- Branch: United States Air Force
- Service years: 1942–1970
- Rank: Colonel
- Awards: Defense Meritorious Service Medal

Colonel Ruth Alice Lucas (November 28, 1920 – March 23, 2013), the first African American woman in the Air Force to be promoted to the rank of colonel and who at the time of her retirement was the highest-ranking African American woman in the Air Force.

== Early life and entrance into the military ==
Ruth Alice Lucas was born in Stamford, Connecticut, on November 28, 1920. Shortly after graduation, Col. Lucas enlisted in the Women's Army Auxiliary Corps (WAAC) in 1942 and was one of the first black women to attend what is now the Joint Forces Staff College in Norfolk, VA. She transferred from the Army to the newly created Air Force in 1947.

== Education and career ==
She was a 1942 education graduate of what is now Tuskegee University in Alabama.

In the early 1950s, while stationed at an Air Force base in Tokyo, Col. Lucas taught English to Japanese schoolchildren and college students in her spare time.

She received a master's degree in educational psychology from Columbia University in 1957 and moved to the Washington, D.C. area in the early 1960s.

Col. Lucas held a variety of positions, mainly in research and education, before being named a colonel in 1968. At the time of her promotion, Col. Lucas was a general education and counseling services assistant in the office of the deputy assistant secretary of defense for education at the Pentagon. She created, organized and implemented special literacy programs aimed to increase the education levels of service personnel.

"Most people don't realize that among all the servicemen who enter the military annually, about 45,000 of them read below the fifth-grade level, and more than 30 percent of these men are black?" she said in a 1969 interview with Ebony Magazine. "Right now if I have any aim, it's just to reach these men, to interest them in education and to motivate them to continue on."

== Retirement ==
Col. Lucas retired from the Air Force in 1970. Her military decorations included the Defense Meritorious Service Medal.

After her military retirement, Col. Lucas became the director of urban services at the old Washington Technical Institute, one of three schools that merged in 1977 to form the University of the District of Columbia. She designed outreach programs to encourage high school students to pursue higher education. In 1994, she retired as the assistant to the dean of UDC’s College of Physical Science, Engineering and Technology.

Col. Lucas was a past member of a Washington Urban League advisory panel on education and worked with the U.S. Equal Employment Opportunity Commission to improve testing techniques.

== Death ==
Col. Lucas died March 23, 2013, at her home in Washington, D.C.

Col. Lucas is buried at Arlington National Cemetery.
