= Julia E. Smith Parker Translation =

First translation of the Bible into English by a woman

Smith's Literal Translation
- Title page of the first edition.
- Full name: The Holy Bible: Containing the Old and New Testaments; Translated Literally From the Original Tongues
- Abbreviation: SLT
- Complete Bible published: 1876
- Translation type: literal
- Copyright: Public domain
- Genesis 1:1–3 In the beginning God formed the heavens and the earth. And the earth was desolation and emptiness, and darkness over the face of the deep: and the spirit of God moved over the face of the waters. And God will say there shall be light, and there shall be light. John 3:16 For God so loved the world, that he gave his only born Son, that every one believing in him perish not, but have eternal life.

The Julia Evelina Smith Parker Translation is considered the first complete translation of the Bible into English by a woman. As of 2017, she is still the only woman to have translated the entire Bible unaided. The Bible was titled The Holy Bible: Containing the Old and New Testaments; Translated Literally from the Original Tongues, and was published in 1876.

== Translator ==
Julia E. Smith (1792–1886), of Glastonbury, Connecticut, had a working knowledge of Latin, Greek and Hebrew. Her father had been a Congregationalist minister before he became a lawyer. Having read the Bible in its original languages, she set about creating her own translation, which she completed in 1855, after a number of drafts. The work is a strictly literal rendering, always translating a Greek or Hebrew word with the same word wherever possible. Smith accomplished this work on her own in the span of eight years (1847 to 1855). She had sought out no help in the venture, even writing, "I do not see that anybody can know more about it than I do."

Smith wanted to be as literal as possible, partially as a result of a failed end-of-the-world prediction by William Miller, which claimed to be based on biblical texts. Smith believed this failure stemmed from straying from the original languages of the Bible, and she set about to create a better translation.

== Translation style ==
Smith's insistence on complete literalness, plus an effort to translate each original word with the same English word, combined with an uncompromising translation of Hebrew tenses (often translating the Hebrew imperfect tense with the English future tense) resulted in a translation that some regard as mechanical. An example of this is Genesis 4:1:

And Adam knew Life, his wife, and she will conceive and bear Cain, and said, I obtained a man of Jehovah.

Noteworthy translation aspects in this verse are the name of Adam's wife, the future tense "will conceive" mixed with the past tense "knew", "said" and "obtained", the lack of quote marks, and translation of the Tetragrammaton. The Divine Name, Jehovah, is featured prominently throughout the Old Testament of this Bible version. In 5876 verses Jehovah appears 6934 times in the OT, per e-Sword. For example, Genesis 2:4 reads:

These the generations of the heavens and the earth in creating them, in the day of Jehovah God’s making the earth and the heavens.

Another example of Smith's translation is Jeremiah 22:23:

Thou dwelling in Lebanon, building a nest in the cedars, how being compassionated in pangs coming to thee the pain as of her bringing forth.

Smith's strict literalism produces an English text that is very concise, at times using far fewer words than other translations. In addition to exact Hebrew tense translation, Greek tenses are also translated literally, providing the same raw transparency. Note the brevity and tense of John 3:16:

For God so loved the world, that he gave his only born Son, that every one believing in him perish not, but have eternal life.

== Publication ==
Smith began her translation in 1847 and finished it in 1855. In 1876, at 84 years of age, some 21 years after completing her work, she finally sought publication. The publication costs ($4,000) were personally funded by Julia and her sister Abby Smith. The 1,000 copies printed were offered for $2.50 each, but her household auction in 1884 sold about 50 remaining copies.

== Importance ==
The translation was one of only a few contemporary English translations out of the original languages available to English readers until the publication of the Revised Version in 1881–1894. This makes it an invaluable Bible for its period.

== See also ==
- Bible translations
- Kimberly Mansion
- Helen Barrett Montgomery
