= Sage-Allen =

Defunct American mid-market department store chain

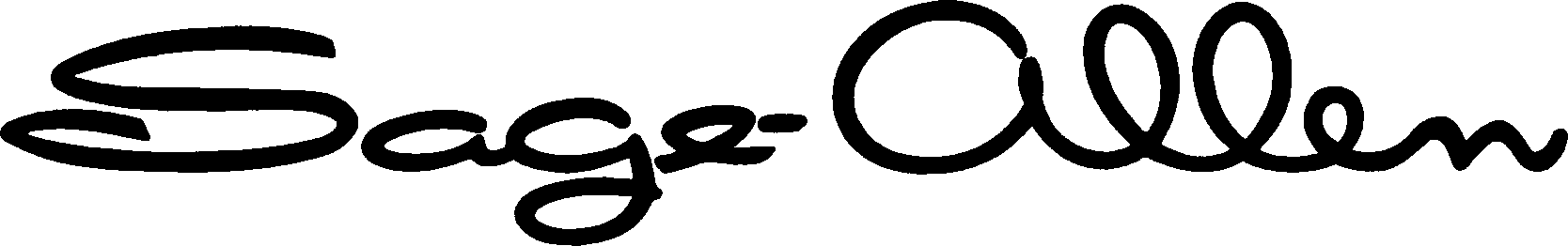
- Industry: Retail
- Founded: 1889
- Defunct: 1993
- Fate: Bankruptcy
- Headquarters: Hartford, Connecticut, U.S.

Sage-Allen was a mid-market department store chain based in Hartford, Connecticut. The store was a fixture in southern New England and anchored a number of smaller local and regional shopping centers in Connecticut, Massachusetts and, later, New Hampshire, until it ceased operation in 1993.

== History ==
Known for its apparel, home goods, accessories and children's wear, the downtown Hartford flagship store was considered a smaller but respected rival to the larger and dominant G. Fox & Co. store a block away. Sage-Allen participated in the wave of post-World War II suburban expansion much earlier than G. Fox and first opened in a number of smaller village center locales prior to the more modern shopping centers and mall locations it would later occupy.

The company began a slow decline in the mid to late 1980s which was accelerated by the severe economic recession that hit the region in the early 1990s. In a move to bolster the retailer's profitability, a merger was formed with another small regional department store chain, Addis & Dey's, located in Syracuse, New York. In spite of efforts by Sage-Dey, as the merged company was called, to strengthen its economic base, it filed for Chapter 11 in 1992 and ceased operations in 1993.

== Sage-Allen Building ==
The Sage-Allen flagship store building in downtown Hartford, built in 1898, has been restored and now contains both retail space and luxury apartments. The store was known for the free-standing 'Sage-Allen' clock, a local landmark, that was located on the Main Street sidewalk in front of the store until the clock was damaged in a windstorm in 1992. The clock was later repaired and erected on another sidewalk in the city. Its importance as a Main Street landmark was known to the re-developers of the Sage-Allen building, and a deal was struck to return the clock to its traditional place. A clock specialist was called upon to restart the clock after its return to Main Street in the summer of 2007.
