= Cheney Building =

- U.S. National Register of Historic Places
- U.S. Historic district – Contributing property
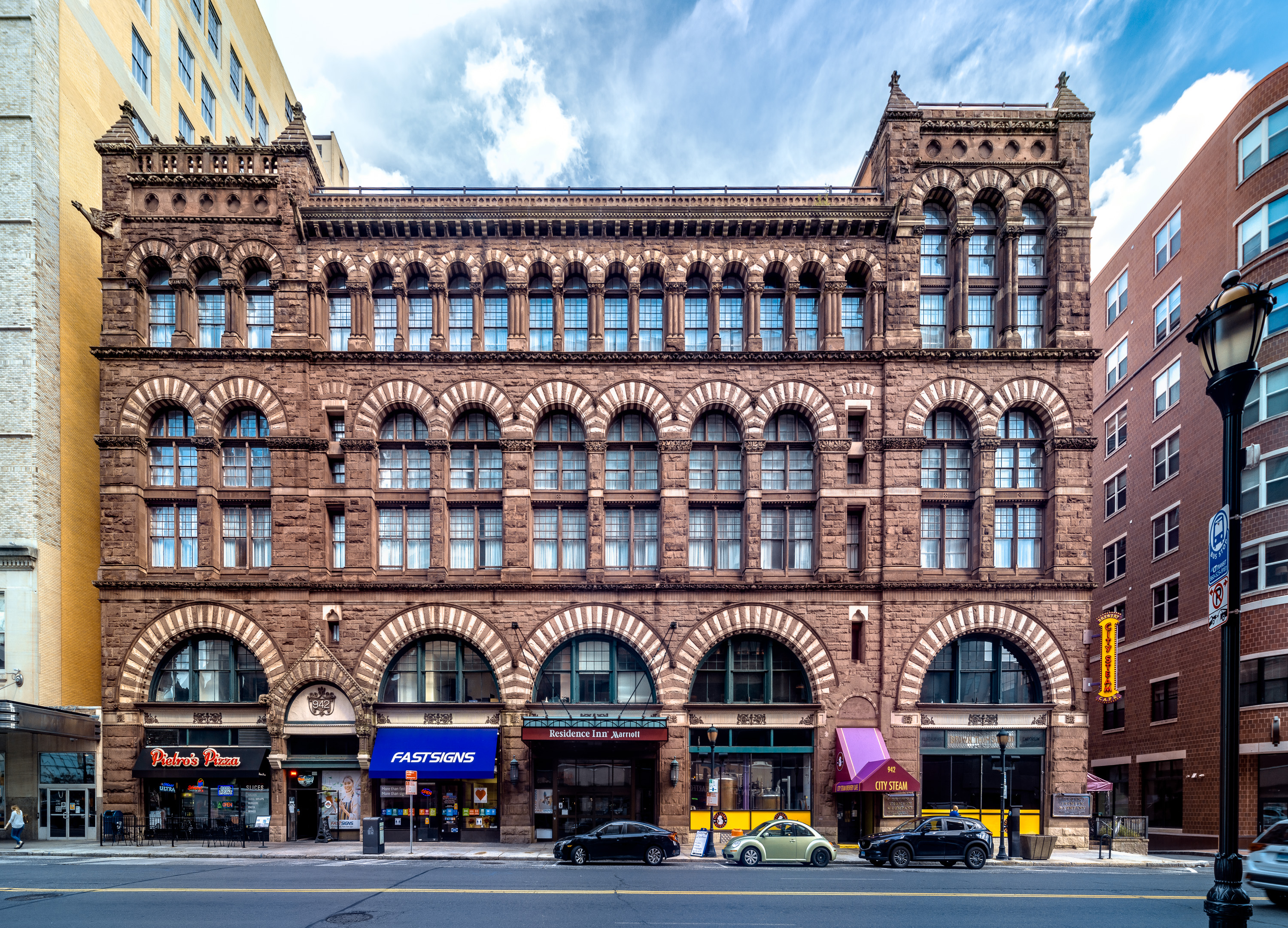
- Cheney Building

- Location within Connecticut
- Location: 942 Main Street; Hartford, Connecticut
- Coordinates: 41°46′4.3″N 72°40′22.1″W
- Architect: H. H. Richardson
- Architectural style: Richardsonian Romanesque
- Part of: Department Store Historic District (ID95000284)
- NRHP reference No.: 78002852

Significant dates
- Added to NRHP: October 6, 1970
- Designated CP: March 23, 1995

The R. and F. Cheney Building, also known as the Brown Thomson Building, is a commercial building designed by noted American architect H. H. Richardson. It is located at 942 Main Street, Hartford, Connecticut, and is now on the National Register of Historic Places.

== History ==
The Cheney Building was constructed 1875–1876 for the Cheney Brothers silk manufacturers in Manchester, Connecticut. It was originally a multipurpose structure with five small shops on the ground floor, and offices and apartments above. For many years it housed Brown Thomson's department store, and later the G. Fox and Company. As of 2007, it has been renamed the Richardson Building, and is now a Residence Inn by Marriott, offices, stores, restaurants, and rehearsal space for The Hartford Stage Company.

The building dominates its corner location and, with towers and attic, is various described as containing five, six, or seven stories. Its facade is organized into three heavy, horizontal tiers of roughly cut, reddish brownstone punctuated with much lighter Berea limestone trim. The lowest tier is defined by a series of huge round arches in striking polychrome bands, a motif repeated in the stories above at an increasingly smaller scale. The ground-floor tier on the Main Street facade features five broad arches above shop windows and doors, the second a two-story arcade of 10 major openings, and the third a single-story arcade of 14 openings.

The building is crowned with low, asymmetric towers at its Main Street corners. The street corner tower was earlier topped by a pyramidal roof.

Until 2024, the building housed a local brewery called City Steam Brewery. The building is currently home to a Residence Inn Marriott, a Fastsigns, and a local restaurant named Pietro's Pizza.

== Gallery ==
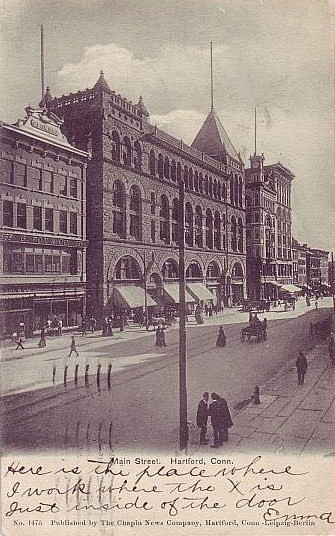
1905 postcard

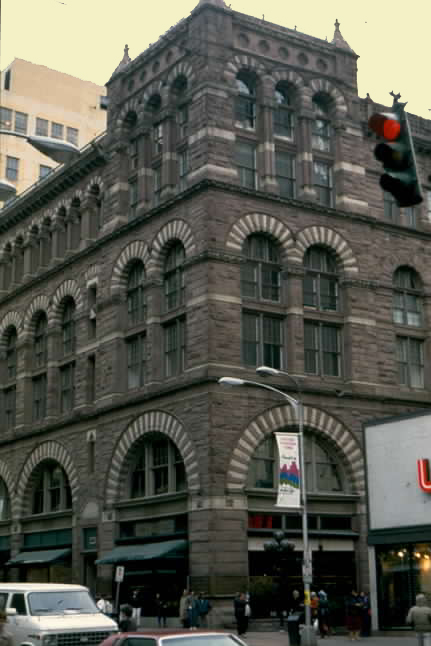
Historic image

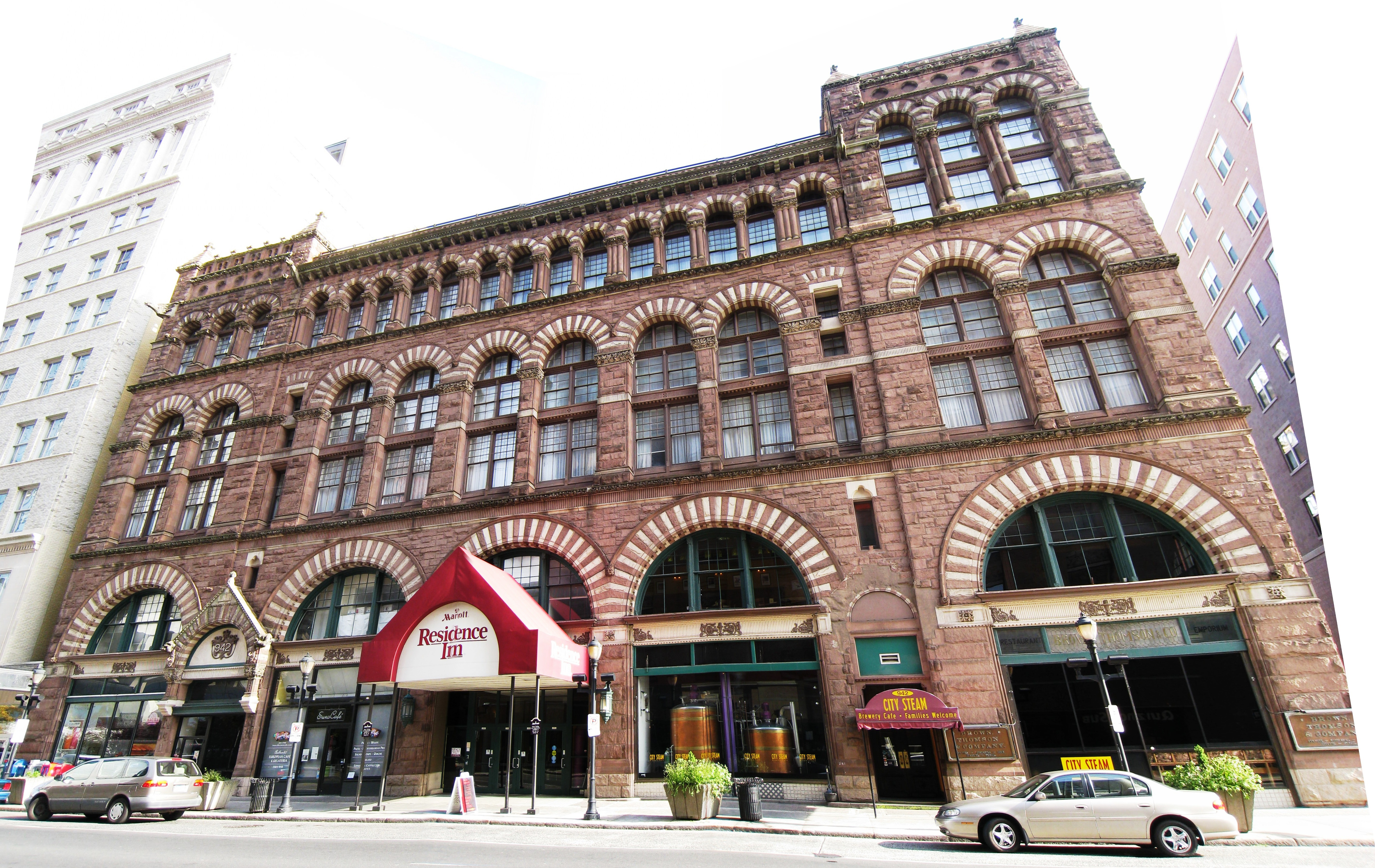
Facade

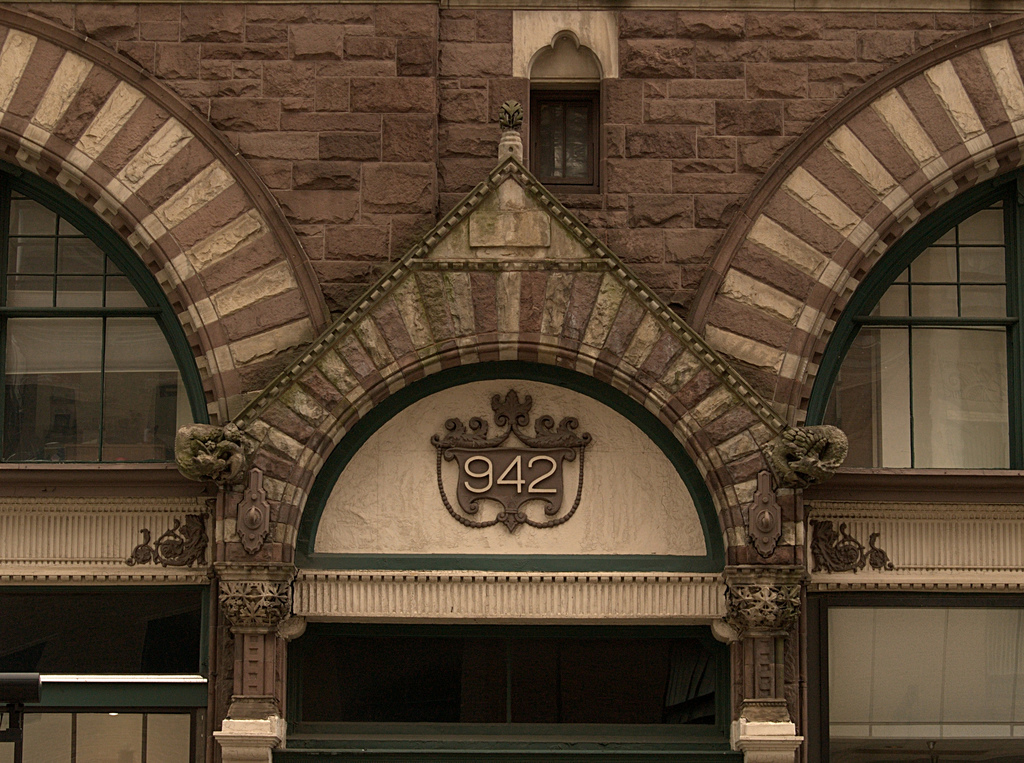
Detail

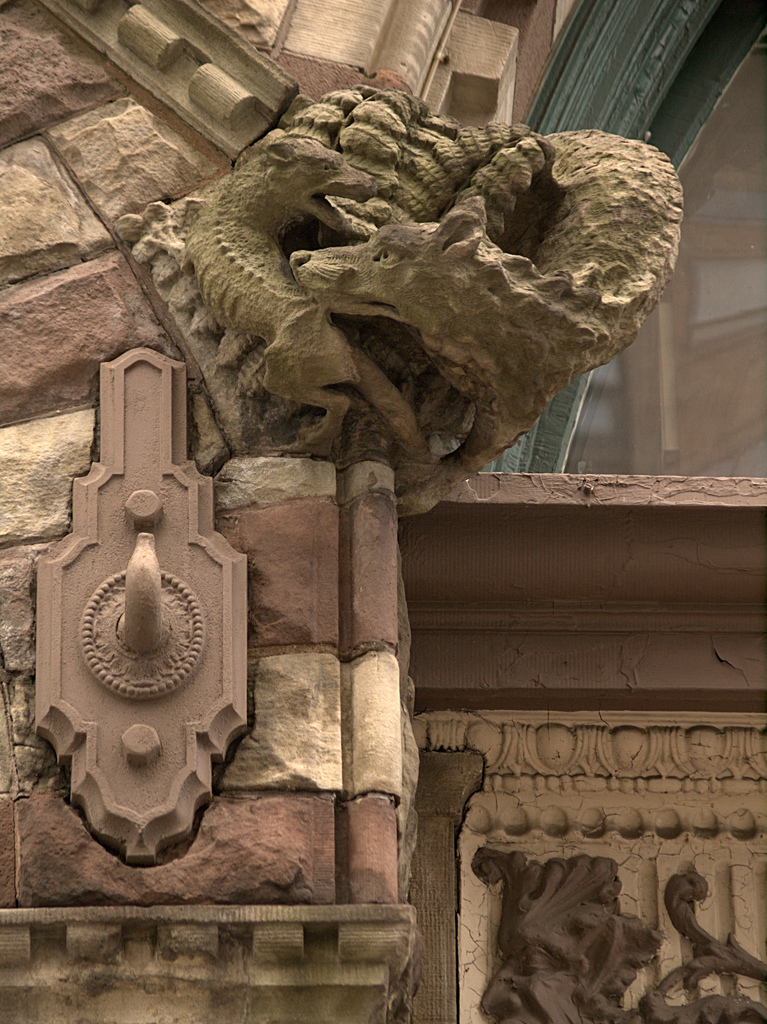
Detail

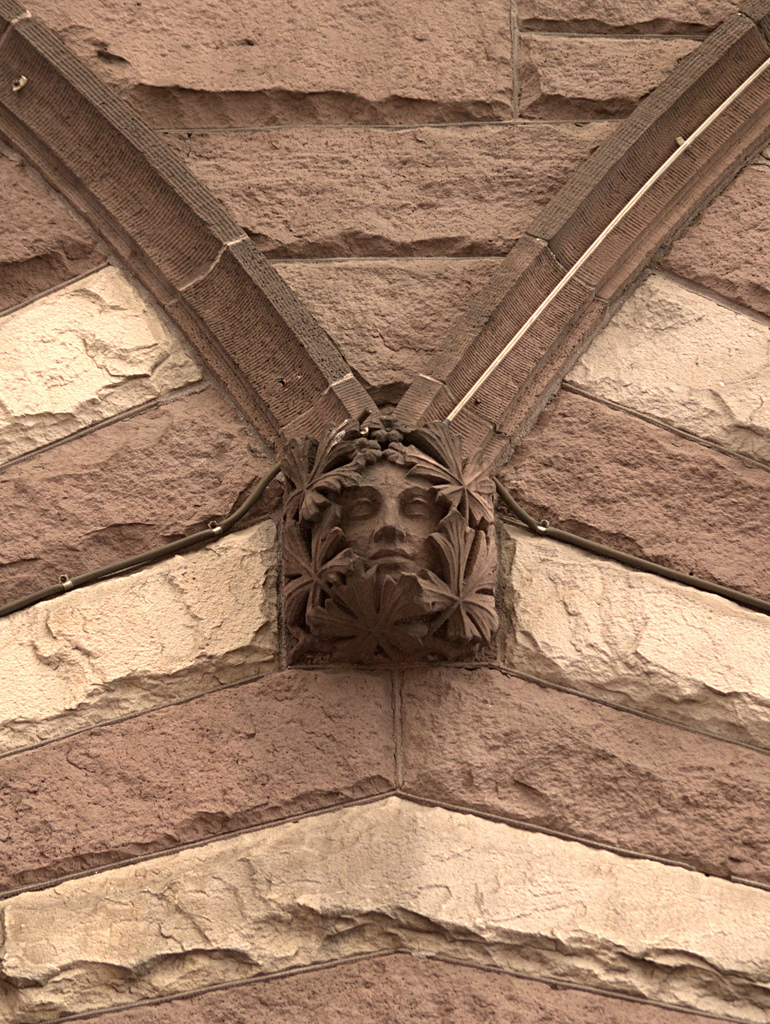
Detail

== See also ==
- National Register of Historic Places listings in Hartford, Connecticut
- Louis R. Cheney
