= Anne Stanback =

American activist

Anne Stanback (born 15 December 1958) is an American activist for LGBT rights and same-sex marriage.

== Early life ==
Stanback was born in Salisbury, North Carolina on December 15, 1958. Her father was a businessman, and her mother was a teacher and also a journalist. Both of Anne's parents were active in the Civil Rights Movement, which instilled Anne with the importance of activism even at a very early age. She attended Davidson College (where her nickname was “Moose,” for her flickerball prowess) and graduated from there in 1981. She then went on to attend the Yale Divinity School.

== Career and activism ==
Stanback's activism is strongly informed by her faith, which she melded with feminist theologies and social justice issues. In Connecticut, Stanback co-chaired the Connecticut Coalition for Lesbian and Gay Civil Rights, and helped pass the Connecticut Gay Rights Statute in 1991. That statute prohibited discrimination towards LGBTQ people in housing, employment, credit, and public accommodations. In 1991, she became executive director of the National Abortion Rights Action League's Connecticut chapter. In 1993, she became the executive director of the Connecticut Women's Education and Legal Fund, wherein she also advocated for Title IX and focused on the disparate support given to men and women's teams. In 1999, Stanback was the founding executive director of Love Makes A Family, an organization based in Connecticut. The organization was formed in response to a court ruling that denied adoption rights to a lesbian couple, and the organization successfully advocated for adoption laws to protect the rights of same-sex couples in Connecticut. Because of their advocacy, Connecticut became the first state in the United States to pass a law that recognized second-parent adoption without the action of a previous court. After their victory, Love Makes A Family shifted their focus to that of same-sex marriage. In 2008 the Connecticut Supreme Court ruled that it was unconstitutional to deny LGBTQ couples the right to marry, and in 2009 the Connecticut General Assembly made that ruling into state law. After that historic win, Love Makes A Family shut down. Stanback is now the Director of Strategic Partnerships for the Equality Federation, wherein she works to pass state-level laws to protect LGBTQ people from employment and housing discrimination. She is a former board member of GLBTQ Legal Advocates & Defenders (GLAD Law) and Freedom for All Americans.

== Honors ==
Stanback has received numerous honors for her work. In 2006, she was inducted into the Connecticut Women's Hall of Fame. She also received the Harriet Tubman Award for Achievement in the Pursuit of Social Justice from the Connecticut Chapter of the National Organization for Women. Additionally, she received the Maria Miller Stewart Award from the Connecticut Women's Education and Legal Fund, and the Polaris Award from Leadership Greater Hartford. She was honored with the William Sloane Coffin Peace and Justice Alumni Award from Yale Divinity School in 2015.
