= The Department Store =

1920 British film by Fred Goodwins

- Directed by: Fred Goodwins
- Written by: Fred Goodwins
- Starring: Fred Goodwins; Gerald Thornton; Andy Hagen
- Production company: Martin's Photoplays
- Distributed by: Faulkner
- Release date: January 1920
- Country: United Kingdom
- Languages: Silent; English intertitles

The Department Store is a 1920 British silent comedy film directed by Fred Goodwins and starring Goodwins, Gerald Thorton and Andy Hagen.

== Cast ==
- Fred Goodwins as Freddie
- Gerald Thorton as Shopwalker
- Andy Hagen as Detective

== Bibliography ==
- Quinlan, David. The Illustrated Who's Who in British Films. B.T. Batsford, 1978.
