= G. Fox & Co. =

American department store chain

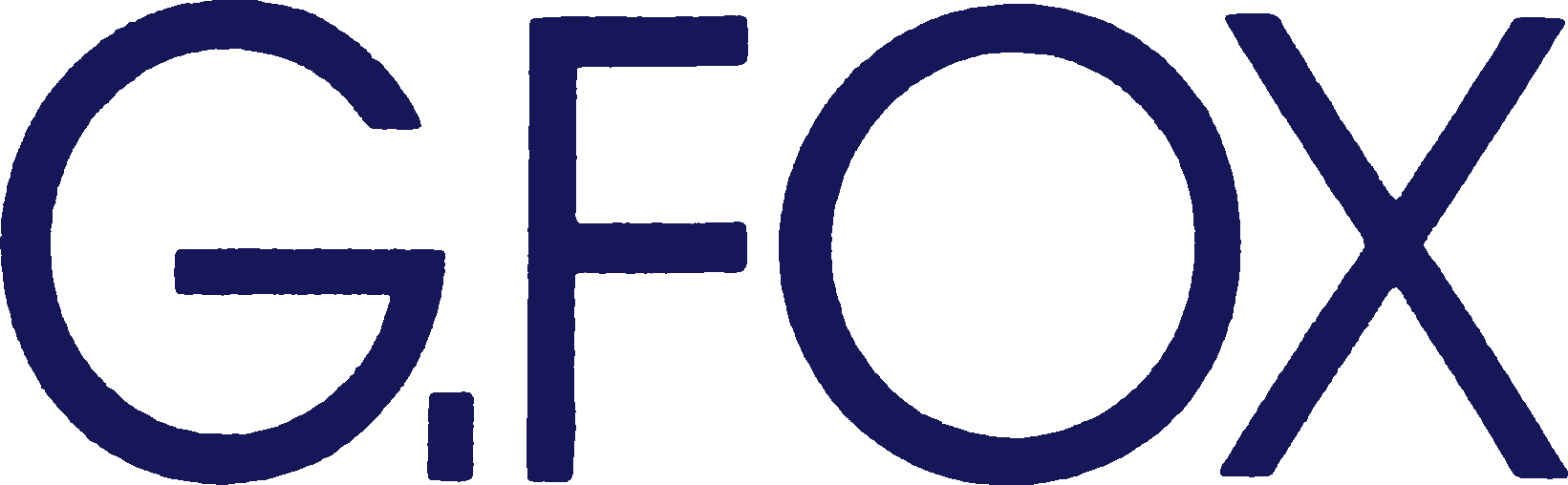

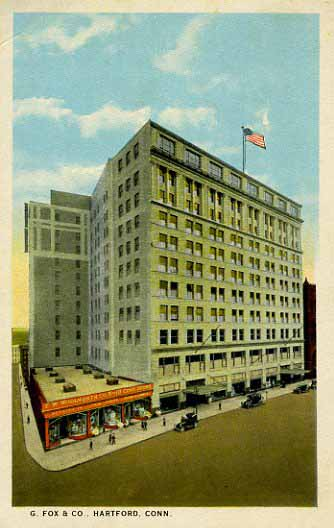
- Postcard of the former flagship store in Hartford (c. 1919)
- Formerly: I. & G. Fox Co.
- Company type: Division
- Industry: Retail
- Genre: Department stores
- Founded: 1847; 179 years ago in Hartford, Connecticut, United States
- Founders: Gerson Fox; Isaac Fox
- Defunct: February 1, 1993; 33 years ago
- Fate: Rebranded by The May Department Stores Company
- Successor: Filene's
- Headquarters: Hartford, Connecticut, United States
- Area served: Northeastern United States
- Products: Clothing; footwear; bedding; furniture; jewelry; beauty products; housewares
- Parent: The May Department Stores Company (1965–1993)

G. Fox & Co. was an American department store chain founded in 1847 by brothers Gerson Fox and Isaac Fox. Its flagship store and headquarters were located in Hartford, Connecticut, and operated throughout New England. It was the largest privately held department store in the United States until its acquisition by The May Department Stores Company in 1965. May dissolved G. Fox and converted stores to Filene's in 1993.

== History ==
=== Early years ===
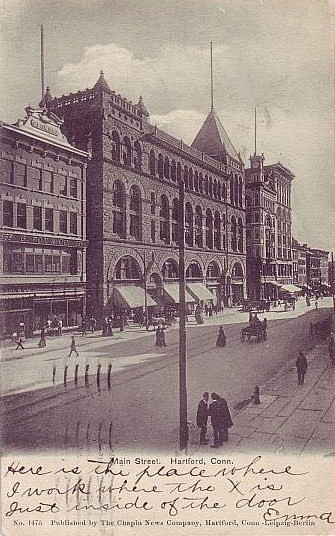
G. Fox & Co. (far left), 406-10 Main Street, Hartford, Connecticut (1880, burned 1917), George Keller, architect.

G. Fox & Co. was established in 1847 by Gerson Fox and his brother, Isaac Fox, and was named I. & G. Fox Co. The first G. Fox store was a single-room storefront opened in Hartford, Connecticut. When Isaac sold his interest to his brother, Gerson renamed the company G. Fox and Company. Gerson's son, Moses, joined the business in 1863, and took over the store in 1880, upon Gerson's death. The early Fox store was famous for home delivery - by wheelbarrow. The store had grown to five floors when it burned to the ground in January 1917. Moses Fox, 66 at the time, announced that work would begin immediately on an 11-story replacement structure. The new flagship store was located at 960 Main Street in downtown Hartford. History has it that the original store and offices, destroyed by fire, were rebuilt because the store's customers rallied and paid approximately 95% of all outstanding bills - voluntarily. Encouraged by the response, Moses Fox had the new store designed by New York architect Cass Gilbert, as an 11-story behemoth, initially dubbed "Fox's folly" in reference to its sheer scale. The new store opened in 1918. The fire served as impetus for Beatrice Fox Auerbach, Moses's daughter, and her husband, George Samuel Auerbach, to return to Hartford from Salt Lake City to help with the business. George died in 1927 and Beatrice then began working alongside her father.

==== Beatrice Fox Auerbach ====
In 1938, Gerson's granddaughter, Beatrice Fox Auerbach, took control of the company upon her father's (Moses Fox) death, and helped transform it into a dominant retail store in the southern New England area for most of the twentieth century. Not long after taking over in 1938 after Moses' death, Beatrice Auerbach embarked on a major renovation that added elegant art deco interior details and a signature marquee above the display windows and entrances along Main Street. Mrs. Auerbach became one of the most prominent executives in American retailing and gained much respect in the Hartford area for her civic and philanthropic efforts, which included endowment to the University of Hartford that named Auerbach Hall in her honor.

Mrs. Auerbach fostered fierce loyalty among her employees and became a pioneer in the realm of employee benefits such as retirement plans, in-store hospitals, loans to employees in need, paid vacations, and at-cost meals. In order to honor longstanding continuous employment, she created the Moses Fox Club to honor those whose employment attained the twenty-five year mark and again at the fortieth and fiftieth year of service. Until her final Moses Fox Club dinner the year before her death, Mrs. Auerbach awarded at least one fifty year pin each year of the club's existence.

Mrs. Auerbach's belief in customer service was so focused that employees were charged with making sure every customer was satisfied, regardless of the cost. While the sales staff was not permitted to make final decisions in this area, Mrs. Auerbach's service managers had the last word, even to the extent that, on rare occasion, they were permitted to override a merchant's decision and take charge to satisfy a customer's need. While no service manager was ever chastised in this effort, an occasional merchant received the dreaded summons to the eleventh floor to be reminded by Mrs. Auerbach personally of her commitment to customer satisfaction. Further evidence of the store's commitment to service had a small staff of the service management personnel and two or three drivers on duty, sometimes until after midnight, on Christmas Eve to dispatch replacements for gifts that had not been received in time to be placed under the tree for Christmas.

Following Mrs. A's (as she was fondly known by the staff) instincts, G. Fox added several major additions to the downtown complex, including a nine-story retail addition to the Market Street (rear) side of the building. To accomplish this addition, a nine-story brick, concrete and steel warehouse had to be moved from one side of a city block to the opposite side - an immense feat at the time. Other additions included a major warehouse (Mrs. Auerbach insisted that it be referred to as the "Service Building") in the 1930s, and a multi-level parking garage in the 1960s to accommodate family cars exiting from the two newly opened Interstate highways into downtown Hartford, and the sixty-station telephone-order department.

The parking garage was situated next to the new interchange of interstate highways 91 and 84. Allegedly, the construction of this interchange, notoriously poor in its original configuration and on a very constrained site, was the result of Mrs. Auerbach's insistence that the off-ramps of the new highway deposit customers, almost literally at the front door of her store. Considering the prevailing culture of the 1960s, and how few female executives existed at the time, this story, if true, would underscore just how influential Mrs. Auerbach was, particularly within the Hartford business community. The story, however, is often regarded as a local urban legend. The non-completion of the interchange was actually caused by local objections to the planned route of connectors through or under Bushnell Park and its sweeping lawn in front of the Connecticut State Capitol designed to bring traffic onto the two highways south of where they actually crossed. To this day motorists entering or exiting Interstate 84 at the Sisson Avenue interchange can see the unfinished exits that would have serviced those never-built connectors. In any event, it would be the mid 1990s before the interchange would be reconstructed to correct many of the earlier flaws, thanks to new technology that allowed construction of a "fly-over" ramp to take vehicles from Interstate 84 East to Interstate 91 North. When the company's third branch store was being constructed in Meriden, G. Fox (actually the May Co.) paid the state of Connecticut the funds necessary to have a highway exit near the new store completed in time for the opening of the new branch.

=== Downtown expansion ===
Throughout the mid-20th century, the store continued to grow exclusively at its downtown Hartford location. Against prevailing trends, Mrs. Auerbach believed that branch stores only detracted from the appeal of the flagship store. This was, in no small part, due to the failure of Foxmart, a farm equipment and supply "branch" of G. Fox in Connecticut's Tobacco Valley. Instead of creating branch locations and in an effort to reach out to her distant customers, Mrs. Auerbach had about one-third of the 11th floor Toy Department carved out and expanded the store's telephone-order facility. As part of this effort, the company added direct phone lines to every exchange in Connecticut and parts of Massachusetts and Rhode Island. In 1947, two years after World War II ended, G. Fox celebrated its 100th birthday.

A final expansion of the downtown store occurred in 1969, when G. Fox took over and expanded into basement and first and second floors of the adjacent historic Cheney Building, designed by H. H. Richardson, which housed another local department store, Brown Thomson, which G. Fox had acquired sometime earlier (G. Fox had already expanded into the third, fourth and fifth floors where general management, personnel, credit & collection, advertising, marketing and sundry behind-the-scenes functions were housed). This building would later be redeveloped into the Richardson Shops Mall in 1980 with about 40 stores, a food court and some residential apartments. The mall also connected G. Fox to the flagship store of another local department store chain, Sage-Allen, which eventually closed this location in the summer of 1990, with the entire chain declaring Chapter 11 bankruptcy and eventually folding in 1994.

The G. Fox flagship store was known for customer attractions, including a large walk-through Christmas display and a talking myna bird housed in a huge cage located on the fifth floor. The store was a pioneer in exhibiting home furnishings in an actual home setting, including kitchens, living rooms, bedrooms and dens. There were two restaurants located on the second floor; one was a lunch bar, while the Connecticut Room was more elegant and featured sit-down meals with table service. Occasionally, G. Fox hosted a fashion show while patrons dined.

=== May Department stores ===
After the 1965 sale of the store to the May Department Stores Company, G. Fox began an ambitious expansion beyond its Hartford base, building its first branch store in 1969 in Waterbury and thus beginning a 12-store branch expansion that continued until the chain was folded into the May Company's Filene's division in 1992. As a result of this merger, coupled with the severe recession that took hold of the regional economy in the early 1990s and the decline of Hartford's downtown retail environment, the flagship store and the executive offices were shuttered on January 29, 1993.

=== Conversion to Filene's ===
Prior to the merger with Filene's, two additional G. Fox stores were announced in Albany, New York and Stamford, Connecticut The Albany store eventually opened at Crossgates Mall, but under the Filene's banner in 1994, and the Stamford store, part of a proposed mall with an existing Lord & Taylor, was never built. Eventually, a Filene's store would open at the nearby Stamford Town Center mall in 1996 in a former J.C. Penney location, but it would close in 2004.

On February 1, 1993, the remaining G. Fox & Co. stores were re-branded as Filene's, until September 9, 2006 when most of that chain was converted to Macy's, after corporate parent May Company's merger with (assumption by) Federated Department Stores was completed on August 30, 2005 and Federated rebranded its corporate self as Macy's, Inc.

After being abandoned for almost a decade, the downtown Hartford G. Fox building was re-opened in the fall of 2002 as a mixed-use commercial complex known as 960 Main. The building now houses street-level retail space, office space, meeting facilities the "Gershon Fox Room" in honor of one of the founders of the store, and the campus for Capital Community College. This renovation and adaptive re-use maintained many of the art deco interior and exterior details while adding a large interior atrium and interior circulation space. In addition, a new and much larger parking garage was also built on the site of the original G. Fox garage on Market and Talcott Streets.

The building is listed on the National Register of Historic Places within the Department Store Historic District.

== See also ==
- List of defunct department stores of the United States
- List of department stores converted to Macy's
