= Kimberly Mansion =

Historic house in Connecticut, United States

- U.S. National Register of Historic Places
- U.S. National Historic Landmark
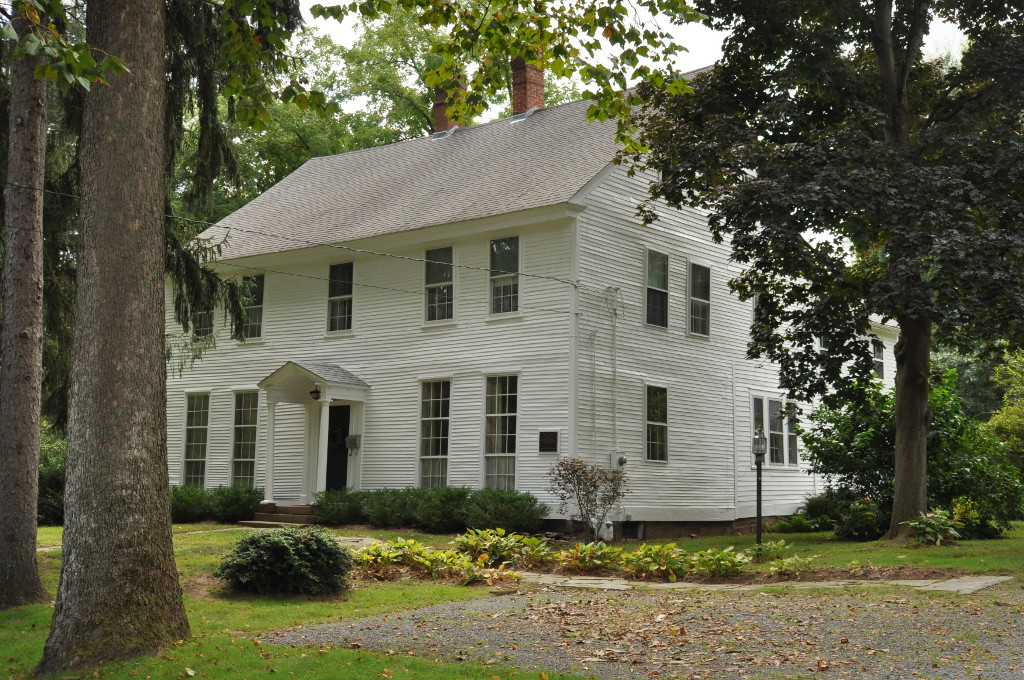

- Location within Connecticut Location within the United States
- Location: 1625 Main Street, Glastonbury, Connecticut
- Coordinates: 41°41′21.86″N 72°36′26.04″W
- Area: 3 acres (1.2 ha)
- Built: circa 1720
- NRHP reference No.: 74002178

Significant dates
- Added to NRHP: September 17, 1974
- Designated NHL: May 30, 1974

The Kimberly Mansion is a historic house at 1625 Main Street in Glastonbury, Connecticut, United States. It was the home of Abby and Julia Evelina Smith, political activists involved in causes including abolitionism and women's suffrage. By contesting the assessment on their property and protesting against "taxation without representation," they brought international attention to the cause of women's rights.

== History ==
The Smith family hosted abolitionist meetings and lectures in their home and on their lawn. They collected signatures for an anti-slavery petition and sent it to former president John Quincy Adams to present to Congress.

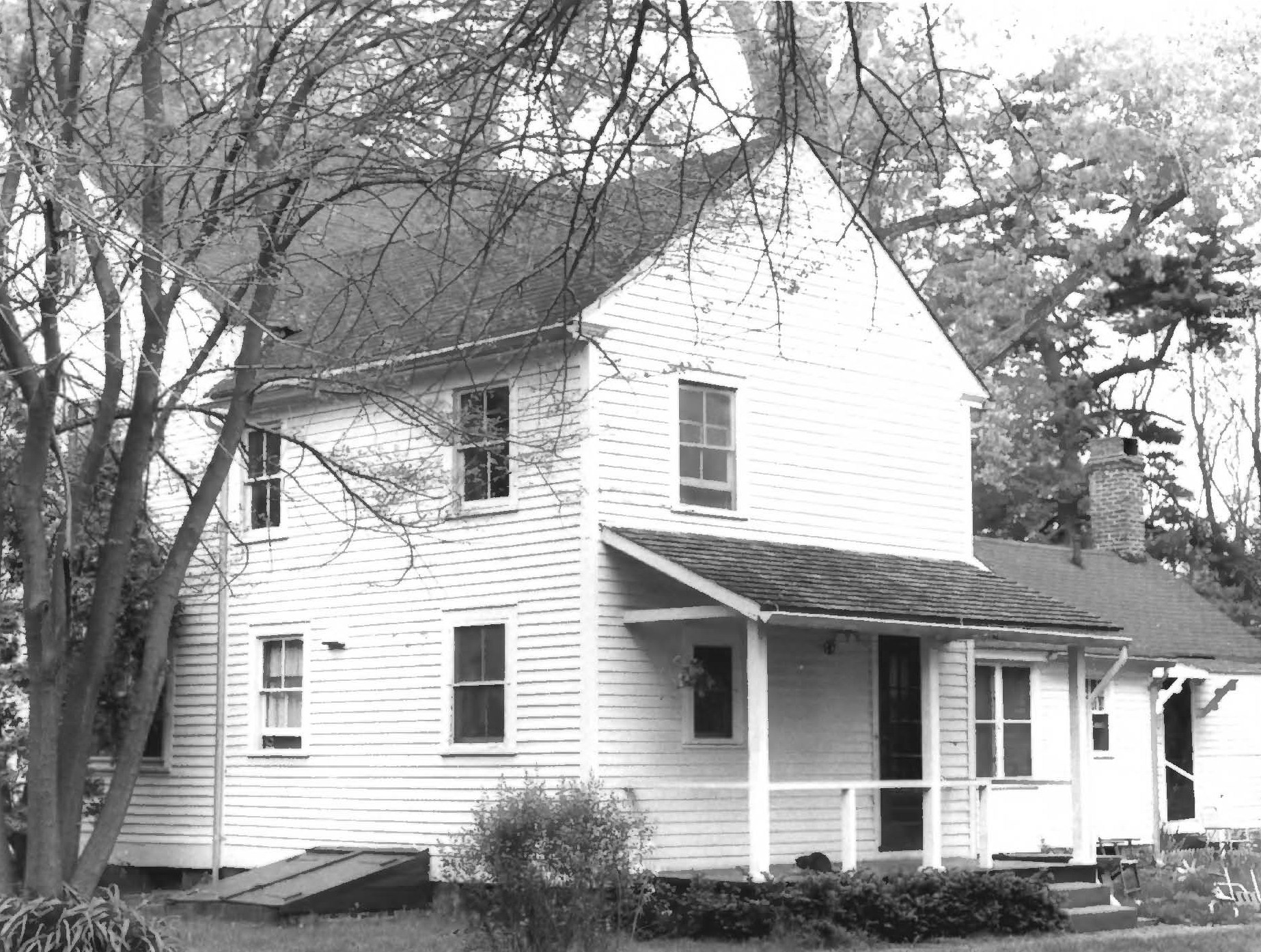
Back of the house, 1973

In 1873, late in their lives, they became tax resisters when they began a two-year fight with local authorities over an inequitable property tax assessment on their property, Kimberly Farm. They owned the most valuable property in town and believed they were being exploited by the town tax collector. In Connecticut at the time, women had no vote and therefore no voice in the disposition of their taxes. They refused to pay their tax until they were given representation. Abby took their concerns to the town council where she said:

The motto of our government is 'Proclaim liberty to all inhabitants of the land!' and here, where liberty is so highly extolled and glorified by every man in it, one-half of the inhabitants are not put under her laws, but are ruled over by the other half, who can take all they possess. How is Liberty pleased with such worship?

The town responded by seizing their Alderney cows, auctioning them off and attempting to auction their farm as well. The sisters were able to buy the cows back and fought the town in court, ultimately winning. The case brought wide national attention to the sisters, their cows and the cause of women's suffrage.

The sisters came from an accomplished and nonconformist family. The sisters' parents were Zephaniah Smith, a lawyer and former Sandemanian minister, and Hannah Hickok, an amateur mathematician and poet. There were three other sisters: Hancy, an inventor; Laurilla, an artist and Cyrinthia, a poet. Julia also knew classical languages and in 1855, she finished the first complete translation of the Bible into English by a woman. She published the translation herself in 1876 as an example of the accomplishments that women are capable of.

The house was declared a National Historic Landmark in 1974 for its association with the Smith sisters and its role in their protest. The large wooden two-story farmhouse was built in the early 18th century by the Connecticut politician Eleazer Kimberly. Zephaniah Smith bought the house in 1790.

== See also ==
- List of National Historic Landmarks in Connecticut
- National Register of Historic Places listings in Hartford County, Connecticut
- List of the oldest buildings in Connecticut
