= Hartford College for Women =

Private college in Hartford, Connecticut, US

Coordinates: 41.7741°N 72.7071°W

- Motto: Sibi constantem esse (To make them steady)
- Type: Liberal arts women's college
- Active: 1933–2003
- Endowment: The father of Professor and author Oliver Butterworth bought the 13 acres property in the west end of Hartford and donated it to the college and maintained the college until his death in the early 1980s. He was a distinguished philanthropist who was interested in assuring that the women of the Greater Hartford area had the opportunity to obtain a higher education. It was Mr. Butterworth who made Hartford College for Women possible. When Mr. Butterworth died in the early 1980s, a cherry tree was planted in the grounds of the property in his memory. Mr. Butterworth was an elegant, highly educated man and very wealthy but he was not pretentious, he was humble. Instead of building a statue in his honor, a cherry tree was planted.
- Dean: Mrs. Davis
- Faculty: Oliver Butterworth, English Professor; Alfredo Gomez Gil, Spanish Professor, Rudolph E. Haffner, Biology Professor, Truda Kushman – Dance Instructor.
- Location: Hartford, Connecticut, USA
- Campus: 13 acres (53,000 m^{2})
- Nickname: HCW

The Hartford College for Women (or HCW) was a two-year private college for women located in Hartford, Connecticut. It was opened in 1933, became a constituent college of the University of Hartford (UHart) in 1991, and closed in 2003.

== History ==
=== 1933 – 1938: The "noble experiment" ===
HCW was founded as the Hartford Junior College, a satellite branch of Mount Holyoke College, located about 40 miles (64 km) north in South Hadley, Massachusetts. At the time, higher education opportunities for women living in the Greater Hartford area were extremely limited, requiring most young women to move away for four years in order to obtain an education. The Hartford Young Women's Christian Association's Education Committee, led by Bess Graham Frazier, approached Trinity College, a men's college in Hartford, and asked them to admit women. Remsen Ogilby, the president of Trinity, refused the offer, instead asking President Mary E. Woolley of Mount Holyoke if she would assist.

Since Mount Holyoke itself was facing difficulty attracting new students due to the Great Depression and competition from new women's colleges opening across the country, Woolley agreed to start a junior college branch in Hartford. Faculty members from Mount Holyoke commuted to Hartford to teach first-year liberal arts coursework. Additional faculty support came from retired Mount Holyoke professors living in the Hartford area and some professors from Trinity, which was at the time the only accredited college in the area. After completing their first year at Hartford Junior College, most students transferred to other institutions, especially Mount Holyoke, which greatly benefited the senior college's enrollment.

Known as Mount Holyoke's "noble experiment," the program was troubled from the beginning by the problems of long-distance administration. In 1938, Mount Holyoke – which, at that point, had begun to experience a rise in its enrollment – withdrew its affiliation, leaving Hartford Junior College as its own independent institution.

The college reorganized itself in 1939, with Howell Cheney, a Hartford businessman, as chairman of its board of trustees. The college retained its junior college mission but added more liberal arts programs, including more offerings in the sciences, social sciences, and arts. The college moved out of the YWCA and into a house on Highland Street, where it would remain for almost two decades.

=== 1939 – 1980s: Reorganization and development ===
Following the end of the Great Depression, more female students were able to pursue higher education, and the student body of the college, now the Hartford College for Women, grew dramatically as a result. Under the 30-year tenure of president Laura A. Johnson, the college expanded its programs to offer 2-year [Associate of Arts] degrees and became a national leader in women's education. She believed in operating HCW as a place for "women who [wanted] to learn and teachers who [loved] to teach," and continued that promote the college that way during the coeducation movement of the 1960s.

In 1955, the college was one of several area colleges approached by the Hartt School of Music, Hillyer College, and the Hartford Art School about a proposed merger. Along with Trinity College and the Hartford School of Music, HCW declined the offer. However, the Council of Hartford Community Colleges (CHCC), formed in 1956 in order to promote the idea of a merge, continued to consider it a priority to merge HCW into the new federation, which in 1957 culminated in the University of Hartford. The CHCC continued to offer the proposal of a merger to HCW even after the founding of the university.

Ignoring the offers to merge, HCW continued as an independent women's college. In 1958, the college purchased the Seaverns estate on Asylum Avenue and relocated the institution to its new wealthy neighborhood. In the early 1960s, HCW began admitting Laura Johnson Scholars, or women who were returning to (or entering) college beyond the traditional age. In 1968, the Career Counseling Center opened, becoming one of the first career counseling centers for women in the United States.

Resisting offers to merge once again in 1975 and 1976, HCW focused on offering more services to attract new students. By offering additional services such as the Career Counseling Center and the Entrepreneurial Center, founded in 1985, the college was able to continue attracting students even as other women's colleges were forced to close due to declining enrollment.

=== 1991 – 2003: Merger to closing ===
By the early 1990s, the college was, like many women's colleges, encountering financial difficulties and decreasing enrollment. Although it had resisted offers to merge several times in the past, HCW finally merged into the University of Hartford in 1991, becoming the last of its constituent colleges to do so.

Although it merged into a coeducational university, giving students access to all of the programs and services offered by UHart, HCW maintained its single-sex status and separate campus. It also continued to develop and sustain new programs, including the Connecticut Women's Hall of Fame, founded in 1994, and the Academic Express program for non-traditional students, founded in 1997. HCW for the first time began to offer B.A. degrees—in Women's Studies and Legal Studies only.

In 2003, the University of Hartford administration announced, to the surprise of most students and faculty, that it would be closing the Hartford College for Women and transitioning all of its degree programs into the College of Arts and Sciences. The news was met with resistance from the HCW community, but the protests were unsuccessful and the college graduated its last class the next spring. Several of the college's programs, including the Career Counseling Center (now the Center for Professional Development) and the Entrepreneurial Center (how part of the CPD), were revamped to cover the entire university and made coeducational.

== Academics and teaching ==
As a liberal arts college, HCW offered courses of study in the humanities, arts, sciences, social sciences, and related fields. Once the college merged into the University of Hartford, students were able to enroll in majors offered through the other constituent colleges, including business and architecture. Students who wished to enroll in HCW programs, however, could only do so if they were female.

HCW was one of the first colleges in the country to offer a major in Women's Studies. The program was cited as one of the most progressive programs in the field by the New England Women's Studies Association due to its special emphasis on the relationship between gender, race, and class.

As the smallest of UHart's colleges, HCW had only five full-time faculty members at the time of its closing, each of whom had joint appointments through the College of Arts and Sciences. As a result, many courses for HCW students were taught by professors from outside the college. The college also had nineteen additional staff members, most of whom worked for the Career Counseling Center or the Entrepreneurial Center.

== Campus ==
HCW classes were originally held at the Hartford branch of the YWCA, located on the current site of the XL Center. After its stint on Highland Street, the college moved to Hartford's more affluent and wooded West End in 1958, where it settled on a 13-acre (53,000 m^{2}) campus near the site of the University of Connecticut School of Law. Several of the Georgian buildings on campus are listed on the National Register of Historic Places.

== Legacy ==
Today, the campus serves as the primary graduate student housing option for University of Hartford. In 2006, The University of Hartford founded the Women's Advancement Initiative which serves female students by helping them develop academic and leadership skills, in memory of the college. The university in addition continues to operate the HCW Career Counseling and Entrepreneurial studies center on the Albany Avenue campus.

== Symbols ==
While HCW's original colors were blue and white – the same as Mount Holyoke's – they were later often replaced with UHart's red and white. Diplomas issued after the merge into UHart featured the university's seal.

The college's seal featured a temple of learning and the Latin motto Sibi constantem esse, which loosely translates into English as "To make them steady," or more accurately, "To be true to oneself."

The most recognizable symbol of HCW today is Butterworth Hall, the main building of the college visible from Asylum Avenue.

== Notable alumnae ==
- Gia Allemand, actor, model, and reality TV contestant
- Patricia Fargnoli, former New Hampshire poet laureate
- Edna Negron Rosario, educator and public health advocate
- Marguerite Yourcenar was the most notable professor at the college in the early 1940s.

== See also ==
- List of current and historical women's universities and colleges in the United States
