= Pearson (surname) =

Family name

Pearson /ˈpɪrsən/ is an English surname. The surname is patronymic, having originally referred to the son of someone with one of many related personal names, such as Pears, Pierre, Per, Pere, Piers, and Peter. On occasion, the name may also have occurred as an adaptation of MacPherson.

Pearson has a historically common presence in the midlands and northern England, as well as in Scotland and Ireland.

Notable people with the surname include:

== Surname ==
=== A ===
- Aaron Pearson (born 1964), American football player
- Adam Pearson (sports executive) (born 1964), British sports executive
- Adam Pearson (actor) (born 1985), British actor and TV presenter
- Albert Pearson (footballer) (1892–1975), English footballer
- Albert J. Pearson (1846–1905), American politician
- Albie Pearson (1934–2023), American baseball player
- Alex Pearson (1877–1966), American baseball player
- Alexander Pearson Jr. (1895-1924), American aviator
- Alfred Pearson (politician) (1850–1921), Canadian politician
- Alfred Chilton Pearson (1861–1935), British classical scholar
- Alfred J. Pearson (1869–1939), Swedish-born American educator and diplomat
- Alfred L. Pearson (1838–1903), American lawyer
- Alison Pearson (accused witch) (1533–1588), Scottish woman executed for witchcraft
- Alister Pearson (born 2000), English artist and illustrator
- Allen Pearson (1925–2016), American meteorologist
- Allison Pearson (born 1960), Welsh columnist and author
- Amy Pearson (born 1985), English singer-songwriter
- Andrew Pearson (runner) (born 1971), British long-distance runner
- April Pearson (born 1989), English actress
- Arthur Pearson (British politician) (1897–1980), British politician
- Arthur Anselm Pearson (1874–1954), English mycologist
- Arthur MacDonald Pearson (1938–2020), Canadian politician

=== B ===
- Beatrice Pearson (1920–1986), American actress
- Benjamin Pearson (disambiguation), multiple people
- Bernard Pearson (born 1946), British potter
- Bill Pearson (disambiguation), multiple people
- Billy Pearson (1920–2002), American jockey
- Billy Pearson (footballer) (1921–2009), English footballer
- Bird M. Pearson (1803–1859), American judge
- Bob Pearson (1907–1985), English variety performer
- Brian Pearson (disambiguation), multiple people
- Bryan Pearson (disambiguation), multiple people

=== C ===
- Carlton Pearson (1953–2023), evangelical minister
- Carol Lynn Pearson (born 1939), American poet and playwright
- Charles Pearson (disambiguation), multiple people
- Chris Pearson (disambiguation), multiple people
- CJ Pearson (born 2002), American activist
- Colin Pearson (disambiguation), multiple people
- Corey Pearson (born 1973), Australian rugby league footballer

=== D ===
- Dan Pearson (disambiguation), multiple people
- Daniel Pearson (disambiguation), multiple people
- Danny Pearson (disambiguation), multiple people
- David Pearson (disambiguation), multiple people
- Denise Pearson (born 1968), British singer-songwriter
- Derrick Pearson, American sports commentator
- Digby Pearson (born 1962), British record label executive
- Don Pearson, American management consultant
- Drew Pearson (disambiguation), multiple people
- Duke Pearson (1932–1980), American jazz musician

=== E ===
- Edmund Pearson (1880–1937), American librarian and author
- Edward Pearson (disambiguation), multiple people
- Egon Pearson (1895–1980), British statistician
- Eric Pearson (born 1984), American screenwriter
- Ethel Pearson (1870–1959), British humanitarian

=== F ===
- Francis Fenwick Pearson (1911–1991), British administrator in India
- Frank Pearson (1937–2003), British drag queen
- Frederick Pearson (disambiguation), multiple people

=== G ===
- Gary Pearson (disambiguation), multiple people
- George Pearson (disambiguation), multiple people
- Geoff Pearson (born July 1951), British Anglican bishop
- Geoffrey Pearson (1927–2008), Canadian diplomat
- Gerald Pearson (1901–1987), American physicist
- Greg Pearson (born 1985), English footballer

=== H ===
- Harold Pearson (disambiguation), multiple people
- Harry Pearson (disambiguation), multiple people
- Henry Pearson (disambiguation), multiple people
- Herb Pearson (1910–2006), New Zealand cricketer
- Hesketh Pearson (1887–1964), British biographer
- Homer Pearson (1900–1985), American politician from Colorado
- Hugh Pearson (disambiguation), multiple people
- Humphrey Pearson (1893–1937), American screenwriter and playwright

=== I ===
- Ian Pearson (disambiguation), multiple people
- Isaac N. Pearson (1842–1908), American politician
- Isabelle Pearson (born 1981), Canadian judoka
- Issette Pearson (1861–1941), English golfer

=== J ===
- Jack Pearson (1922–2007), English cricketer
- Jahcour Pearson (born 1998), American football player
- James Pearson (disambiguation), multiple people
- Jerome Pearson (1938–2021), American engineer
- Joanna Pearson, American writer
- Joe Pearson (disambiguation), multiple people
- John Pearson (disambiguation), multiple people
- Johnny Pearson (1925–2011), British composer and pianist
- Joseph Pearson (disambiguation), multiple people
- Josh Pearson (born 1997), American football player
- Josh T. Pearson (born 1974), American musician
- Justin Pearson (born 1975), American rock musician

=== K ===
- Karl Pearson (1857–1936), British statistician
- Kayleigh Pearson (born 1985), English model
- Kenneth Pearson (born 1951), English cricketer
- Kevin Pearson (disambiguation), multiple people

=== L ===
- Landon Pearson (1930–2023), Canadian politician
- Larry Pearson (born 1953), American NASCAR driver
- Lars Pearson (born 1973), American publisher
- Les Pearson (rugby league), English footballer
- Lester B. Pearson (1897–1972), Canadian politician
- Linda Pearson (born 1964), Scottish sport shooter
- Linley E. Pearson (born 1946), American politician
- Lloyd Pearson (1897–1966), British actor
- Luke Pearson (born 1987), British cartoonist

=== M ===
- Malcolm Pearson (born 1942), British businessman and politician
- Maria Pearson (1932–2003), American native activist
- Mark Pearson (disambiguation), multiple people
- Martin Pearson (born 1971), Welsh rugby league footballer
- Mary Pearson (disambiguation), multiple people
- Maryon Pearson (1901–1989), English wife of Lester Bowles Pearson
- Megan Pearson, British actress
- Michael Pearson (disambiguation), multiple people
- Michelle Pearson (born 1962), Australian swimmer
- Monte Pearson (1908–1978), American baseball player

=== N ===
- Nancy Pearson (née Wallace), American curler
- Nate Pearson (born 1996), American baseball pitcher
- Neil Pearson (born 1959), English actor
- Nick Pearson (born 1979), American speed skater
- Nigel Pearson (born 1963), English football manager
- Noel Pearson (born 1965), Australian lawyer
- Noel Pearson (producer), Irish film and theatre producer

=== O ===
- Oliver Paynie Pearson (1915–2003), zoologist

=== P ===
- Patricia Pearson (born 1964), Canadian journalist
- Patrick Pearson (1930–2022), British philatelist
- Paul Pearson (disambiguation), multiple people
- Pepe Pearson (born 1975), American football player
- Peter Pearson (disambiguation), multiple people
- Philip Pearson (disambiguation), multiple people
- Preston Pearson (born 1945), American football player
- Puggy Pearson (1929–2006), American poker player

=== R ===
- Ralph Pearson (1919–2022), American chemist
- Raymond A. Pearson (1873–1939), American academic administrator
- Richard Pearson (disambiguation), multiple people
- Rick Pearson (disambiguation), multiple people
- Ridley Pearson (born 1953), American writer
- Robert Pearson (disambiguation), multiple people
- Roger Pearson (disambiguation), multiple people
- Ronald Pearson (1959–2001), American actor, model, and director
- Ronald Hayes Pearson (1924–1996) was an American designer, jeweler, and metalsmith.
- Ross Pearson (born 1984), English mixed martial artist
- Rutledge Pearson (1929–1967), American civil rights activist
- Ryan Pearson (disambiguation), multiple people

=== S ===
- Samuel Pearson (1814–1884), English entrepreneur
- Scott Pearson (born 1969), Canadian ice hockey player
- Stan Pearson (1919–1997), English footballer
- Stedman Pearson (1964–2025), English singer
- Stephen Pearson (born 1982), Scottish footballer
- Steven Pearson, American physician
- Stuart Pearson (disambiguation), multiple people
- Sally Pearson (born 1986), Australian runner

=== T ===
- Tanner Pearson (born 1992), Canadian ice hockey player
- T. R. Pearson (born 1956), American novelist
- Ted Pearson (born 1948), American poet
- Thomas Pearson (disambiguation), multiple people
- Tilian Pearson (born 1987), American singer
- Todd Pearson (born 1977), Australian swimmer
- Tony Pearson (disambiguation), multiple people
- Travis Pearson (born 1971), American football player
- Trevor Pearson (born 1952), English footballer
- Trevor Pearson (cricketer) (born 1943), Australian cricketer

=== V ===
- Virginia Pearson (1886–1958), American actress

=== W ===
- Wayne Pearson, American politician
- Weetman Pearson (1856–1927), English engineer and oil industrialist
- Wilf Pearson, English footballer
- Will Pearson (born 1979), American magazine owner
- William Pearson (disambiguation), multiple people
- Willie Pearson Jr. (born 1945), American sociologist

=== Z ===
- Zachariah Pearson (1821–1891), English shipowner

== See also ==
- Daniel Kimball Pearsons (1820–1912), American physician and philanthropist
- Peirson, given name and surname
- Pierson (surname)
- List of This Is Us characters
