= List of marketing and advertising authors =

The terms marketers and advertisers encompass a vast number of fields and individuals. This list includes notable authors of books on marketing and/or advertising.

- David Aaker
- Marty Appel
- Edward Bernays
- Leonard Berry (professor)
- Chris Brogan
- Leo Burnett
- Jack Canfield
- Joel Comm
- Stephen Covey
- Roberto Duailibi
- Seth Godin
- Timothy R. Hawthorne
- Tom Hayes (author)
- John Hegarty (advertising executive)
- Claude C. Hopkins
- Philip Kotler
- Jay Conrad Levinson
- Paul Margulies
- David Ogilvy
- Bryan Pearson (businessman)
- Al Ries
- David Meerman Scott
- Jack Trout
- Jeff Zabin

== See also ==
- Lists of writers
