= Peter Pearson (painter, born 1957) =

American painter

Peter Pearson is an American icon painter, author, and teacher of icon painting. He has created hundreds of icons for private collectors, churches, and other institutions throughout the world. Through his workshops and seminars, he has worked with more than 2,500 students. His workshops give even the most inexperienced painter the skills to paint their own icon.

He began painting icons at the age of twelve and has studied under Russian icon painter Dr. Nina Bouroff in Bethesda, Maryland and Philip Zimmerman at the St. John of Damascus School of Sacred Arts, an Orthodox school of icon painting in Ligonier, Pennsylvania. He also trained with Valentin Streltsov of Toronto, Canada, Nicholas Papas in Greensburg, Pennsylvania, Father Damian Higgins at the Sisters of Saint Basil Monastery, Fox Chase, Pennsylvania, Xenia Pokrovsky at Saint Tikhon's Monastery in South Canaan, Pennsylvania, at the Iconography Institute at Mount Angel Abbey in Oregon, where he studied with Charles Rohrbacher of Juneau, Alaska, with Michael Kapeluck of Carnegie, Pennsylvania, and Philip Davydov of Saint Petersburg, Russia.

Pearson also studied architectural drafting and color at the International Institute of Design in Washington, D.C., and theology, with a specialization in liturgical studies, at St. John's Seminary in Boston, Georgetown University, and at Saint Vincent Seminary in Latrobe, Pennsylvania, where he graduated magna cum laude, completing a Master of Divinity degree in 1995. His course work included specialized studies on the history of church architecture and liturgical vesture, the role of art in worship, as well as a full year on liturgical consultation. In early 2016, he received a Th. D. from The Providence Theological School.

Peter has served a number of parishes as a priest for over 30 years and is a vowed member of a Franciscan community in the Episcopal/Anglican Church.
