= Bill Pearson =

Bill Pearson may refer to:

- Billy Pearson (1920–2002), American jockey
- Billy Pearson (footballer) (1921–2009), Irish footballer
- Bill Pearson (New Zealand writer) (1922–2002), New Zealand fiction writer, essayist and critic
- Bill Pearson (footballer, born 1922) (1922–2010), Australian rules footballer for Essendon
- Bill Pearson (footballer, born 1892) (1892–1959), Australian rules footballer for South Melbourne
- Bill Pearson (American writer) (born 1938), American novelist, publisher and editor
- Bill Pearson (rugby league), Australian rugby league footballer and coach
- Bill Pearson (Neighbours), fictional character on the Australian soap opera Neighbours

== See also ==
- William Pearson (disambiguation)
