= James Pearson =

James or Jim Pearson may refer to:

== Entertainment ==
- James Pearson (painter) (died 1838), English glass painter
- James Larkin Pearson (1879–1981), poet
- James Anthony Pearson (born 1989), British actor
- James Pearson, Ronnie Scott's Jazz Club's house pianist since 2006

== Politics ==
- James Pearson (Nebraska politician) (1873–?), Nebraska politician and radio preacher
- James B. Pearson (1920–2009), U.S. Senator from the state of Kansas

== Sports ==
- James Pearson (climber), English rock climber
- James Pearson (rugby union) (died 1915), Scotland rugby player
- James Pearson (footballer, born 1905) (1905–1962), English footballer
- James Pearson (footballer, born 1993), English footballer
- James Pearson (Northamptonshire cricketer), English cricketer
- James Pearson (cricketer, born 1983), English cricketer
- Jim Pearson (born 1953), Scottish footballer
- Jim Pearson (ice hockey) (born 1950), Canadian ice hockey defenceman
- James Pearson (speedway rider) (born 2005), Australian speedway rider

== Others ==
- James Pearson (business advocate), CEO of the Australian Chamber of Commerce and Industry
- James Pearson (engineer), British railway engineer and locomotive designer
- James Pearson (minister), 17th-century dean of Dunblane Cathedral
- James Pearson (VC) (1822–1900), Irish recipient of the Victoria Cross
- James William Pearson (1895–1993), American World War I flying ace who served with the British
- James Douglas Pearson (1911–1997), Orientalist librarian and bibliographer, compiler of Index Islamicus

== See also ==
- James Pearson Wells (1822–1896), Ontario farmer and political figure
