= Stained Glass Museum, Ely =

Stained Glass Museum
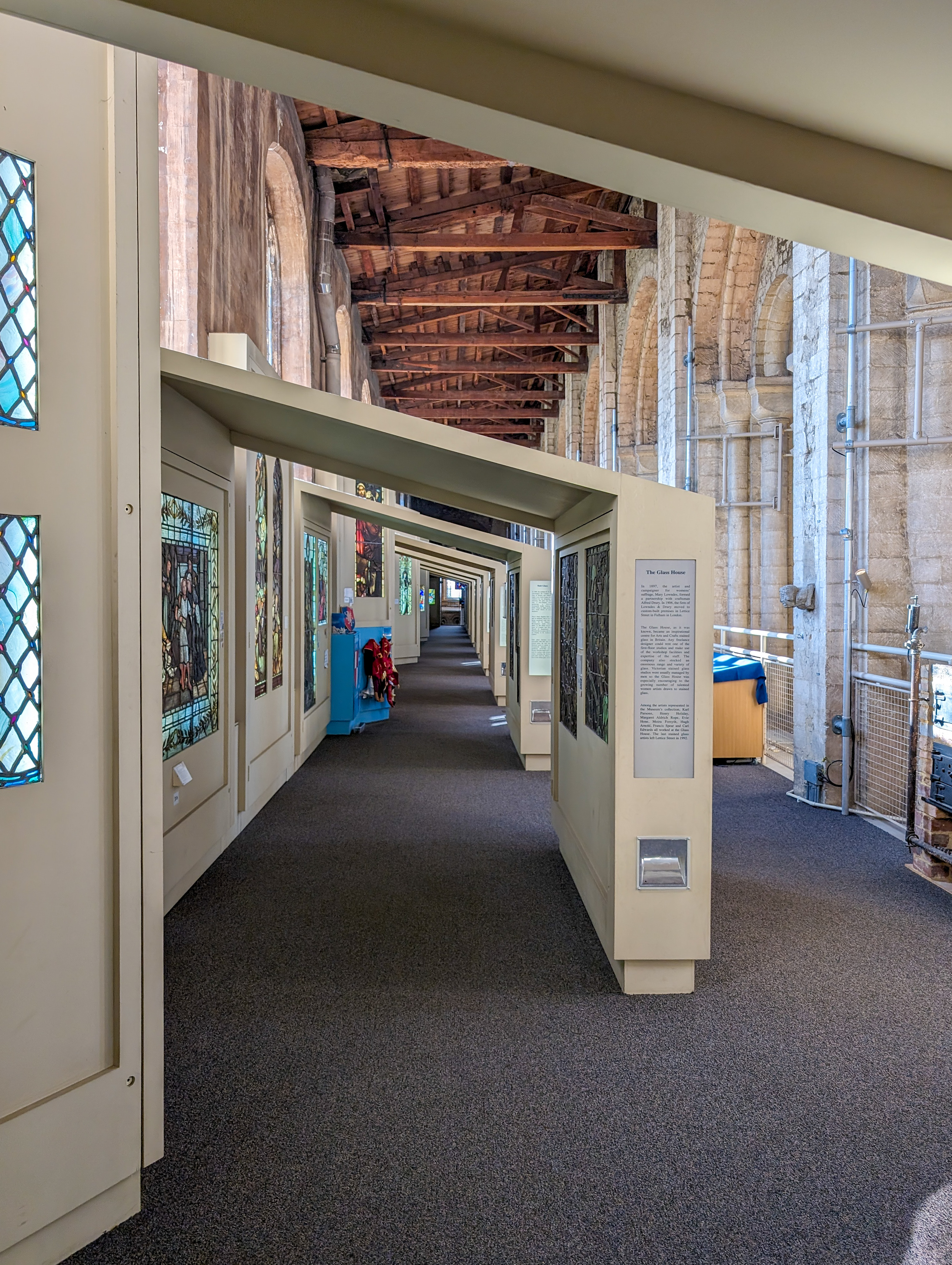
- Established: 1972; 54 years ago
- Location: Ely Cathedral, Ely, Cambridgeshire, England
- Type: Stained glass museum
- Collection size: More than 1,000 stained glass panels
- Founders: Trenchard Cox, Martin Harrison
- Chair of Board of Trustees: Mark Hosea
- Curator: Dr Jasmine Allen
- Website: stainedglassmuseum.com

The Stained Glass Museum is the United Kingdom's only museum dedicated exclusively to the art of stained glass. Located in Ely Cathedral in Cambridgeshire, the museum houses a nationally significant collection of stained glass panels, designs, materials, and tools that illustrate the development of stained glass from the 13th century to the present day.

== History ==
The institution that would later become the Stained Glass Museum was founded in 1972 as a repository for stained glass panels and windows at risk of destruction, particularly those removed from redundant churches and other threatened buildings. The project originated when Dr Peter Moore proposed to colleagues of the Chapter of Ely Cathedral that they should make the north triforium (arched gallery) available for storage of stained glass that might otherwise be lost. The idea received the backing of the Dean and Chapter and a steering committee was established to oversee the project. It was initially chaired by Sir Trenchard Cox, former director of the Victoria and Albert Museum, and later by Margot Eates. Art historian Martin Harrison was employed as curator. Grants from the Pilgrim Trust and Ratcliffe Trust made possible the rescue of a group of windows that were among the first accessions to the repository.

Initially, it was envisaged that windows in storage at Ely Cathedral would be preserved and stored behind closed doors until homes in other churches could be found as opportunities arose. However, the success of a temporary exhibition in Ely Cathedral's Lady Chapel encouraged the idea that the repository could be converted into a permanent display of the finest pieces from its growing collection of glass.

After a fundraising campaign, the Stained Glass Museum opened to the public on 30 March 1979 in the north triforium of Ely Cathedral. Its display of stained glass in internally-lit display boxes was considered innovative at the time, allowing visitors to appreciate the exhibits at close quarters without compromising the lit environment that stained glass requires to be fully appreciated. From the outset, contemporary stained glass was a feature of the museum's display and practicing artists gifted or loaned pieces to the museum in order that curation could cover the full sweep of the history of glassmaking from the medieval era to the present day.

The museum's permanent display presents a chronological arrangement of more than 125 glass panels and other materials illustrating the evolution of stained glass techniques and styles over 800 years. Loans from partner institutions, including the Victoria and Albert Museum and the Royal Collection, have been added to the museum's own holdings. The museum also mounts temporary exhibitions and runs an active learning programme of workshops, talks and family activities.

From its opening, the museum's purpose was not just to preserve redundant stained glass, but to educate visitors on the history of the medium and its manufacture. The curation includes didactic displays that demonstrate how stained glass is designed and made. Glaziers' equipment also forms part of the collection and is shown alongside artworks to provide context. One of the original motivations for turning the repository into a public museum was to highlight the traditional skills that buildings such as Ely Cathedral depend upon for their maintenance and longevity.

In 1996 the museum launched a £350,000 appeal to fund the move of its collection to its current location in the cathedral's south triforium. Having met its fundraising target, this new space opened to the public in April 2000.

King Charles III is Patron of the Stained Glass Museum, having accepted the appointment in 1997 when Prince of Wales, during the museum's 25th anniversary year.

In 2026, the museum's collection was awarded designated status by Arts Council England, recognising its national significance.

== Collection ==
The collection of the Stained Glass Museum comprises more than 1,000 stained glass panels, both complete and fragmentary. While the museum was founded with the specific purpose of rescuing works from closed religious and secular buildings across the British Isles, its remit has grown to include acquisitions and gifts of significant works that represent the development of the art form.

In addition to stained glass panels, the museum preserves preparatory designs, cartoons (full-size working drawings), and maquettes (small preliminary models), as well as tools and materials associated with the design and manufacture of stained glass.

The following is a selection of works (listed by date) that are either preserved in the collection of the Stained Glass Museum or on long-term loan to the institution:

- French artist active in Soissons – Bust of a King (c. 1210). Purchased 2003.
- French artist – St Vincent on the Gridiron (c. 1225–1250). Acquired 2021.
- English artist active in the West Midlands – Scenes from the life of the Virgin (c. 1340). Gifted 1976.
- English artist – The Principalities [Principans Turma] (15th century). Purchased 2015.
- Dirck Vellert (attr.) – The Suicide of Charondas of Catanea (c. 1530). Gifted 1992.
- James Pearson – Portrait of George III (1793). On loan since 1992.
- William Wailes – Sacrifice of Isaac (mid-19th century). Gifted 2004.
- John Hardman Powell – Noli Me Tangere (1852). Gifted 1975.
- Dante Gabriel Rossetti – Labours of the Months, August and December (1863). Gifted 2001.
- William Butterfield – Elders of the Apocalypse (c. 1864). On loan since 1998.
- William de Morgan – King David (c. 1870). Gifted 1978.
- William Morris – Minstrels (c. 1870–1889). Gifted 2016.
- Henry Holiday – The Ministry of Christ (1907). Gifted 1973.
- Christopher Whall – Descent of Holy Spirit (1907). On loan since 2023.
- Mary Lowndes – The Finding of the Saviour in the Temple (1910). Gifted 1974.
- Andrew Stoddart – Launcelot and Elaine (c. 1910).
- Edward Burne-Jones – Angel Musicians, St Matthew, Fidelitas, and St Luke (1910–1912). On loan since 1975.
- Karl Parsons – St Columba (1913). Gifted 1977.
- Douglas Strachan – David Anointed as King (1916). Purchased 2024.
- Francis Spear – Nativity (1923). Gifted 2012.
- Harry Clarke – St Wilfrid and St John Berchmans (1927). Purchased 1998.
- Moira Forsyth – The Temptation of St Francis (c. 1930). On loan since 1993.
- Ervin Bossányi – Morning and Evening (1933). Gifted 1976.
- Evie Hone – Christ Meeting his Mother (c. 1950). Gifted 1989.
- Georges Braque – Still life with Coffee Grinder (1954). Gifted 2009.
- John Piper – Experimental Panel (c. 1956). On loan since 2003.
- Margaret Traherne – Virgin and Child (1956). Gifted 2005.
- John Hayward – St Michael and Saints (1958). Gifted 1975.
- Pauline Boty – Female figure (1958–1962). Acquired 2016.
- Paul San Casciani – Inner Space (1979). Gifted 2024.
- Brian Clarke – Peel Cottage Window (1982). On loan since 2000.
- Patrick Reyntiens – The Temptation of St Anthony (1984). Purchased 1999.
- Graham Jones – Sister Moon … Mother Earth (2005). Gifted 2017.
- Mark Angus – Wrestling with the Angel (2012). Gifted 2022.
- Kehinde Wiley – Saint Adelaide (2014). Purchased 2021.
- Pinkie Maclure – Beauty Tricks (2017). Purchased 2024.

== Gallery ==
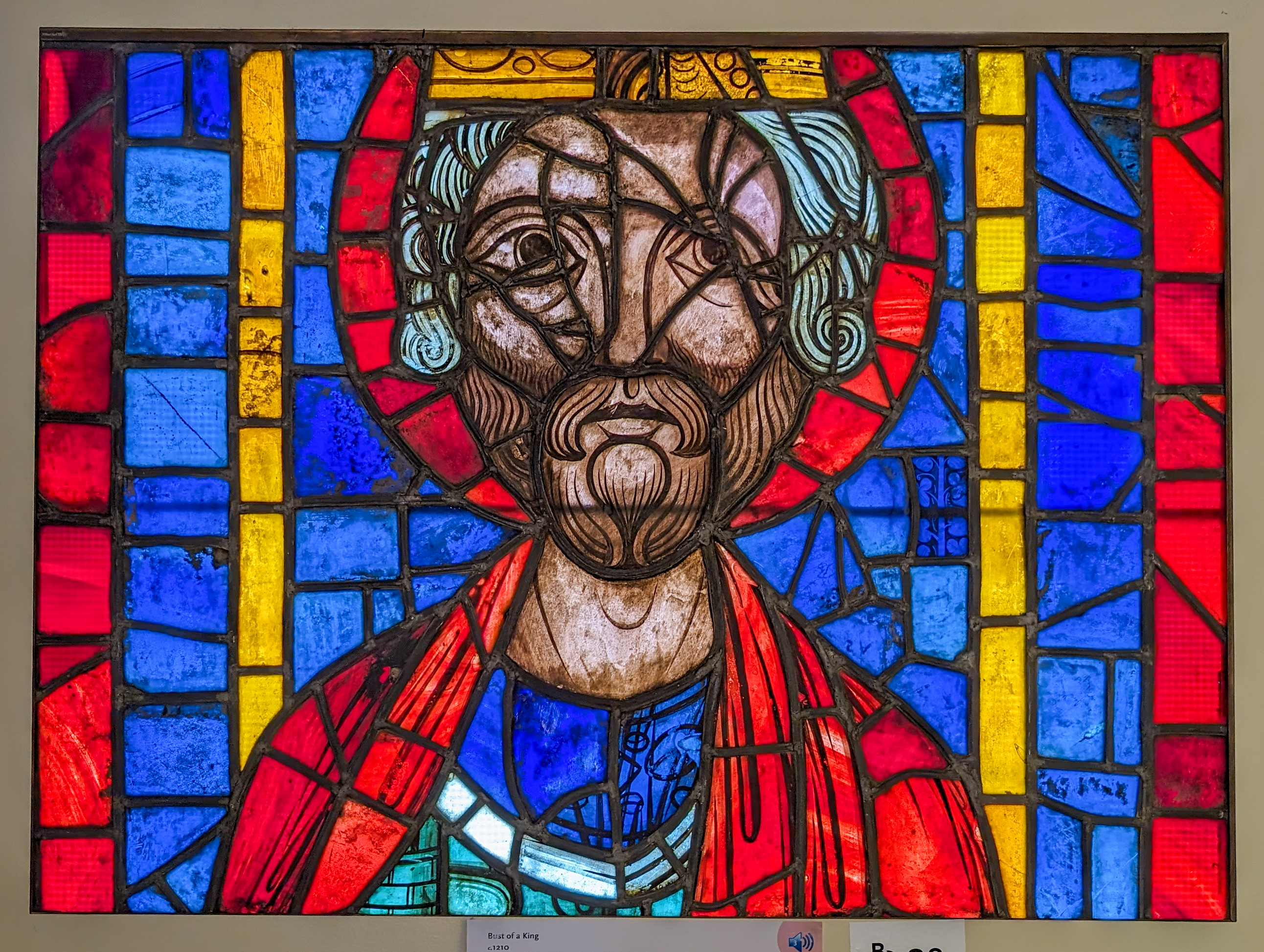
Bust of a King (c. 1210)

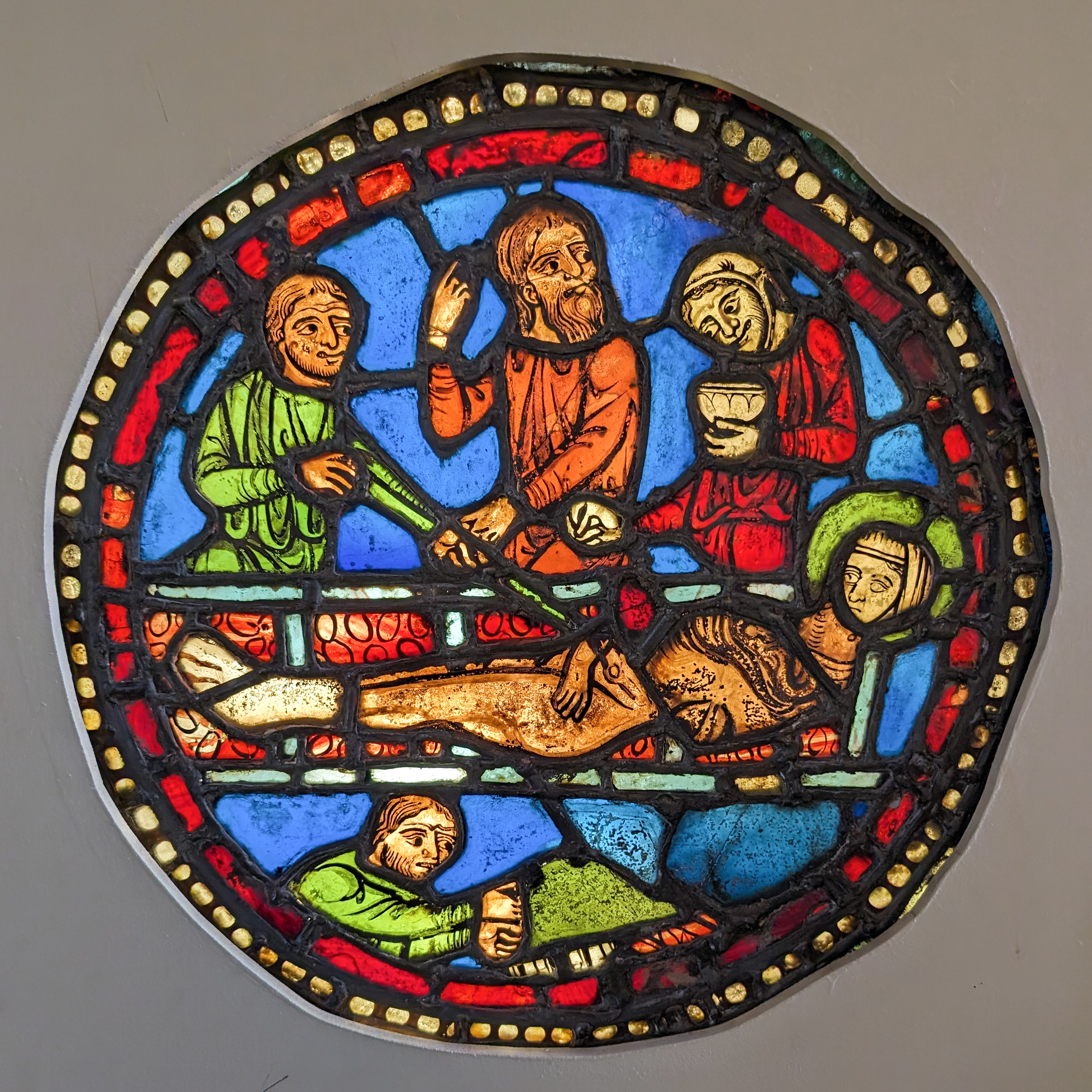
St Vincent on the Gridiron (c.1225-1250)

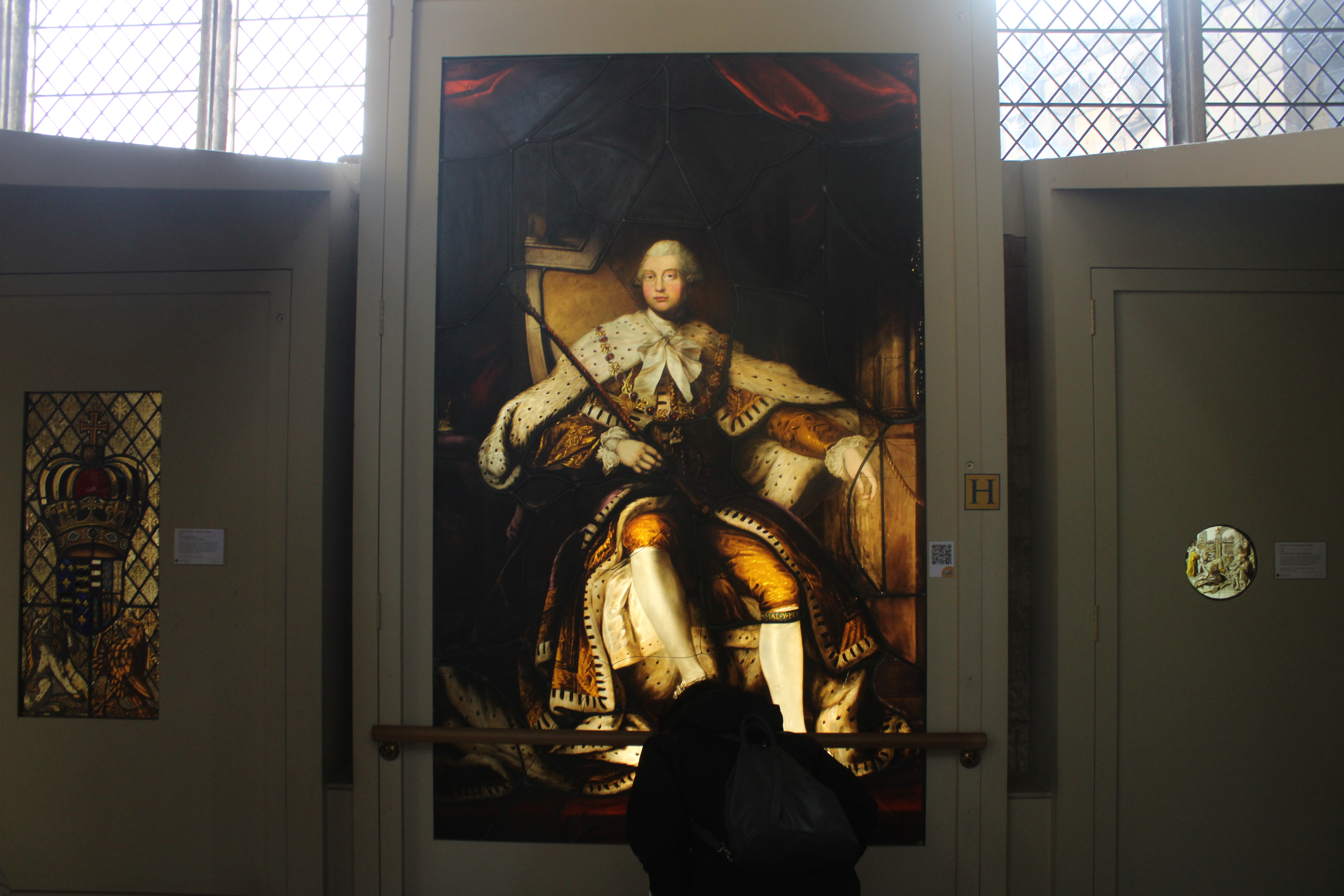
James Pearson, Portrait of George III (1793)

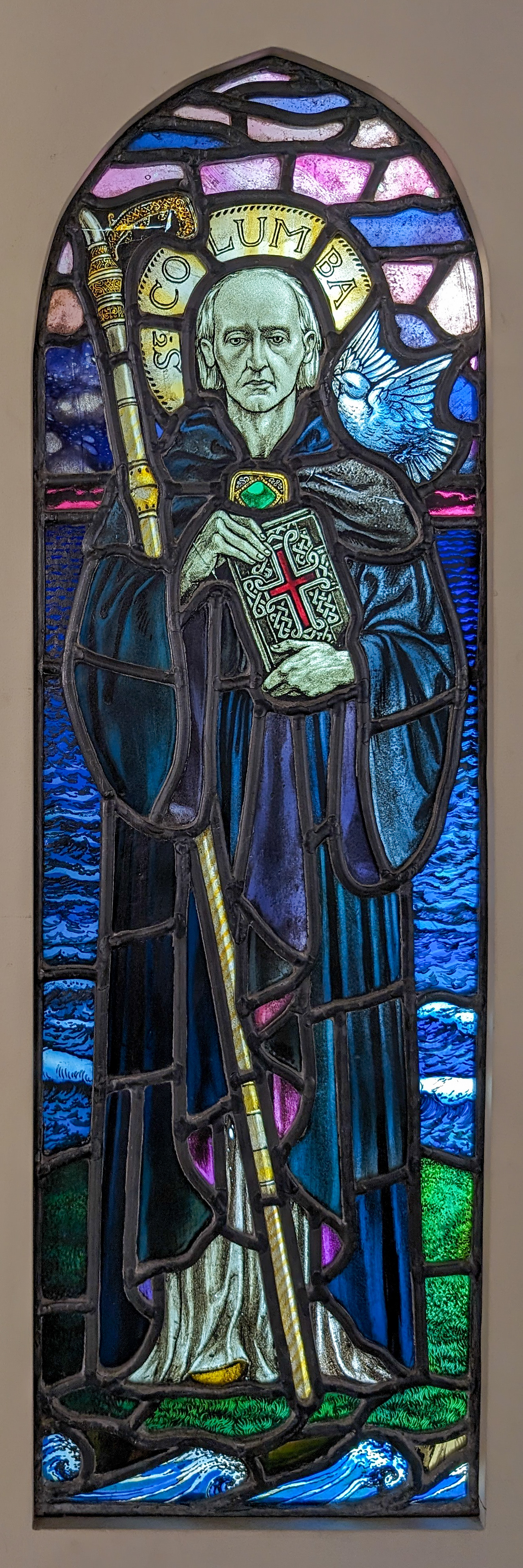
Karl Parsons, St Columba (1913)

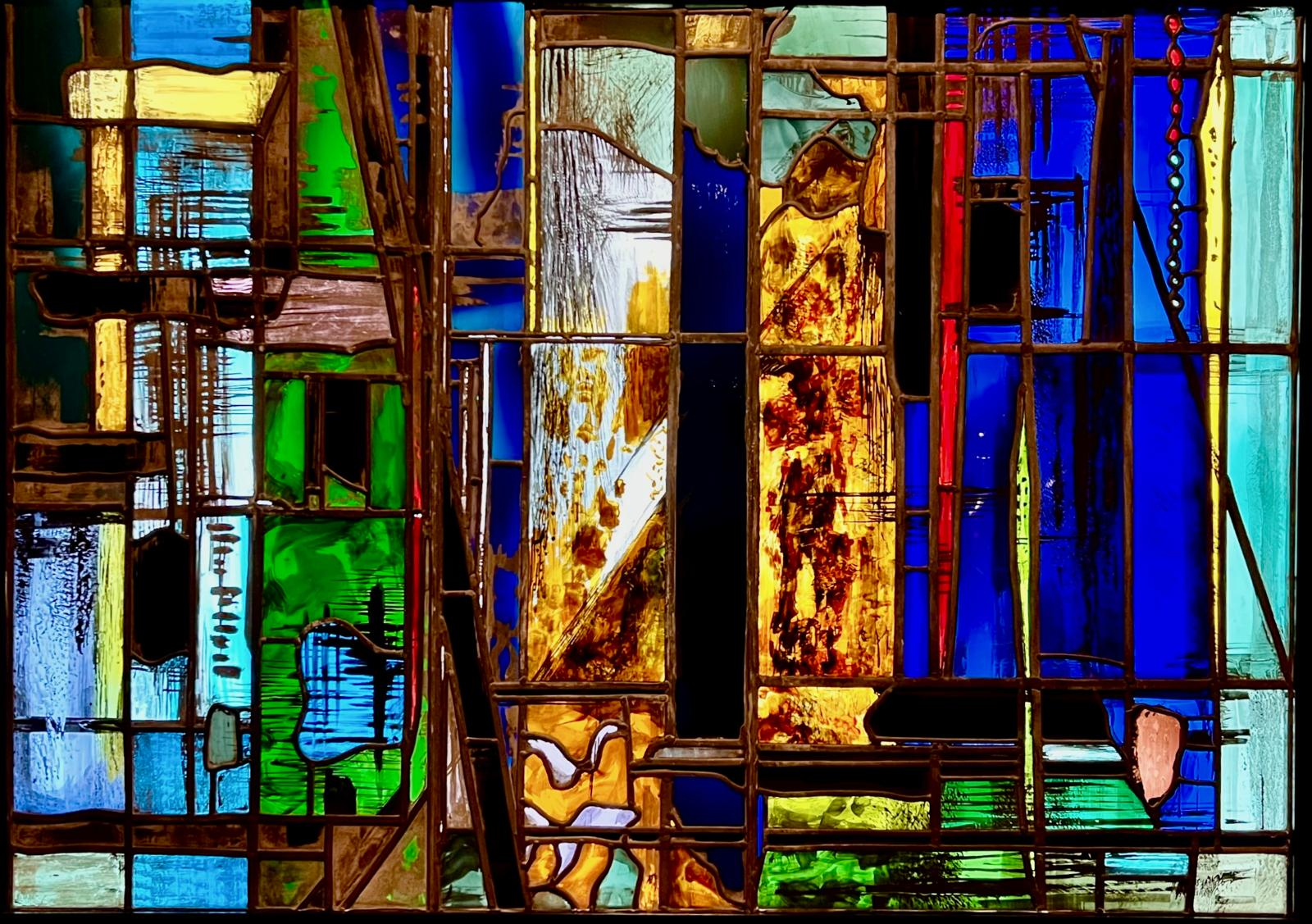
John Piper, experimental panel (c.1956)

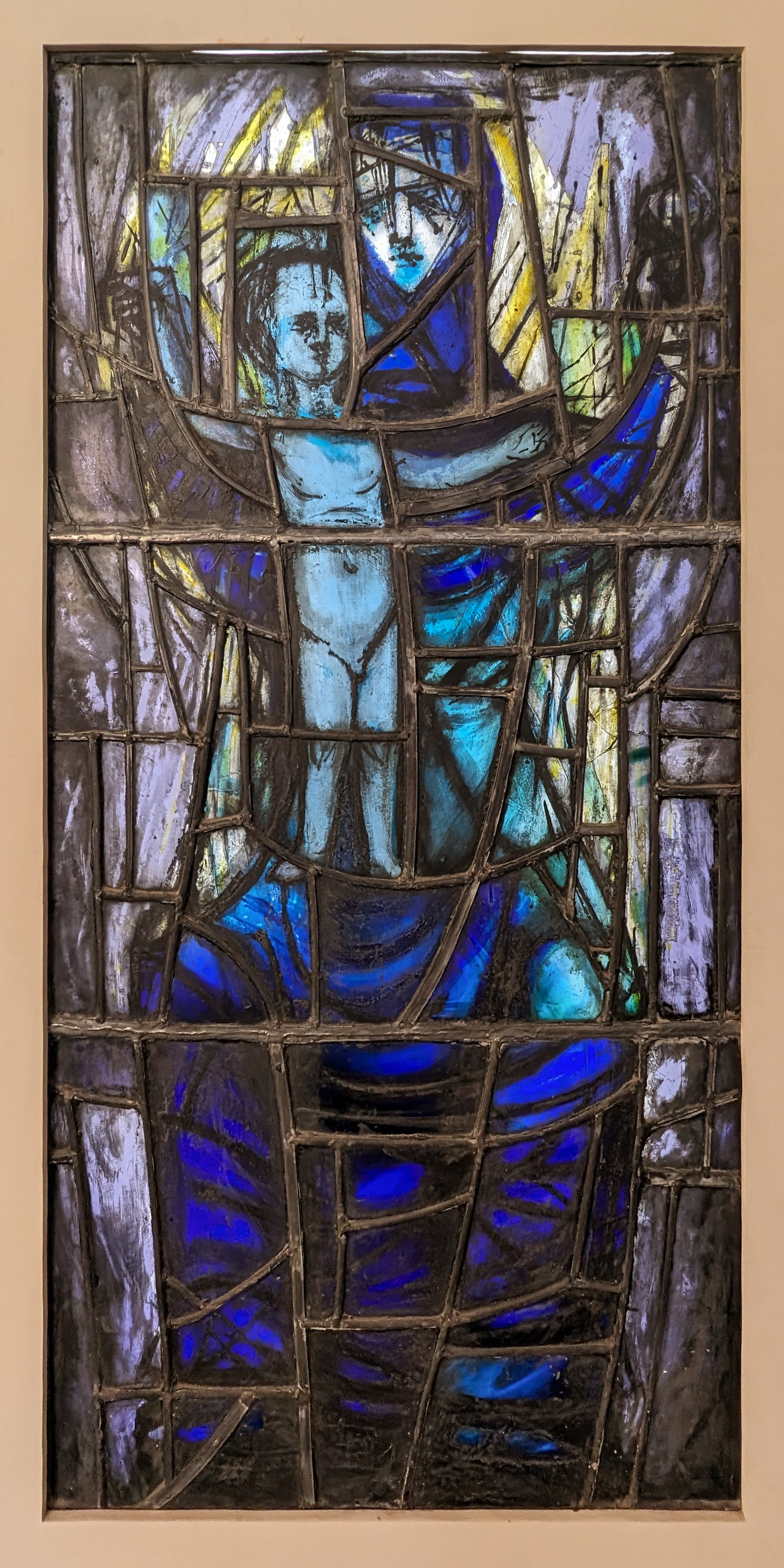
Margaret Traherne, Virgin and Christ Child (1956)

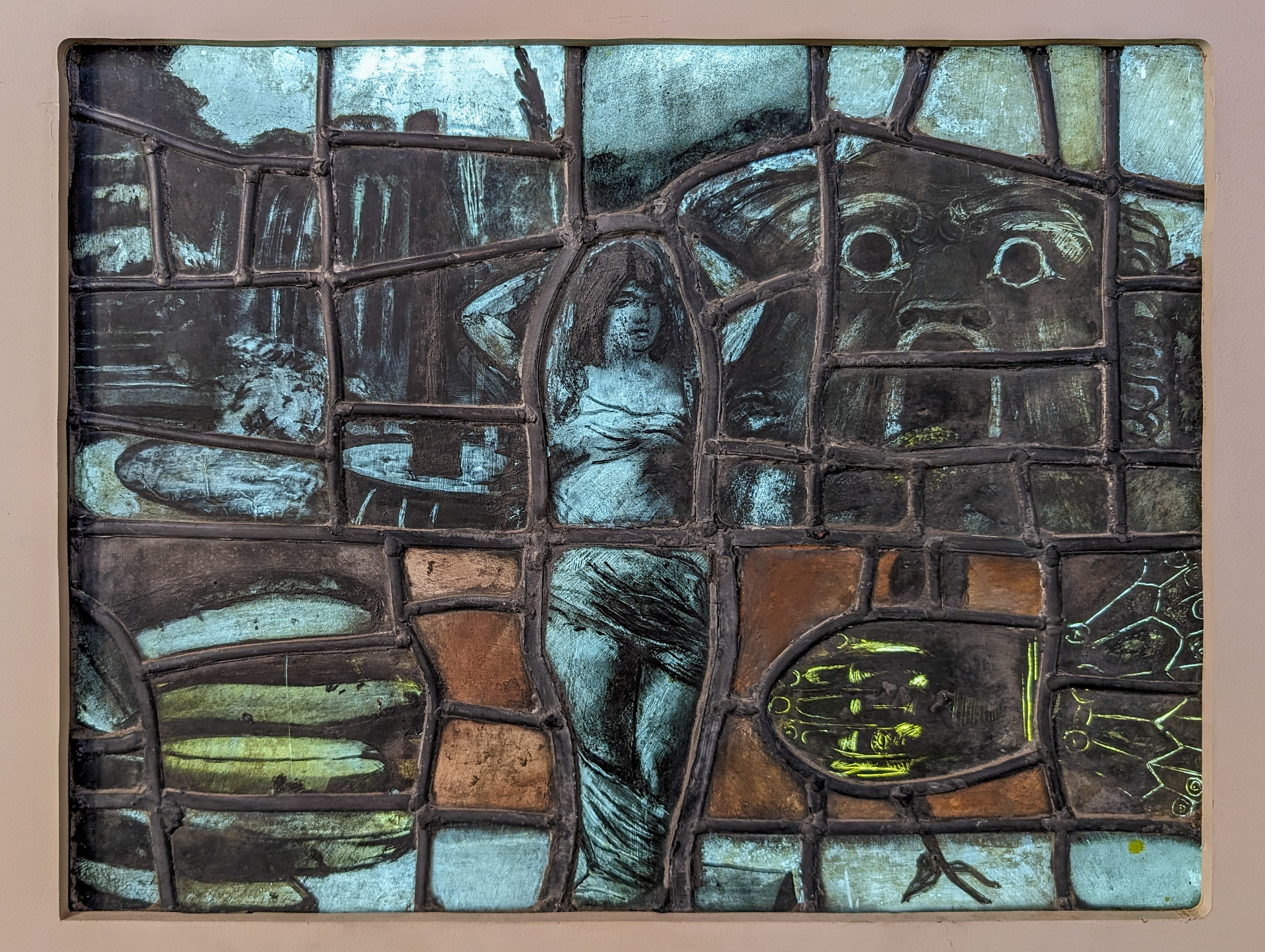
Pauline Boty, female figure (1958–1962)

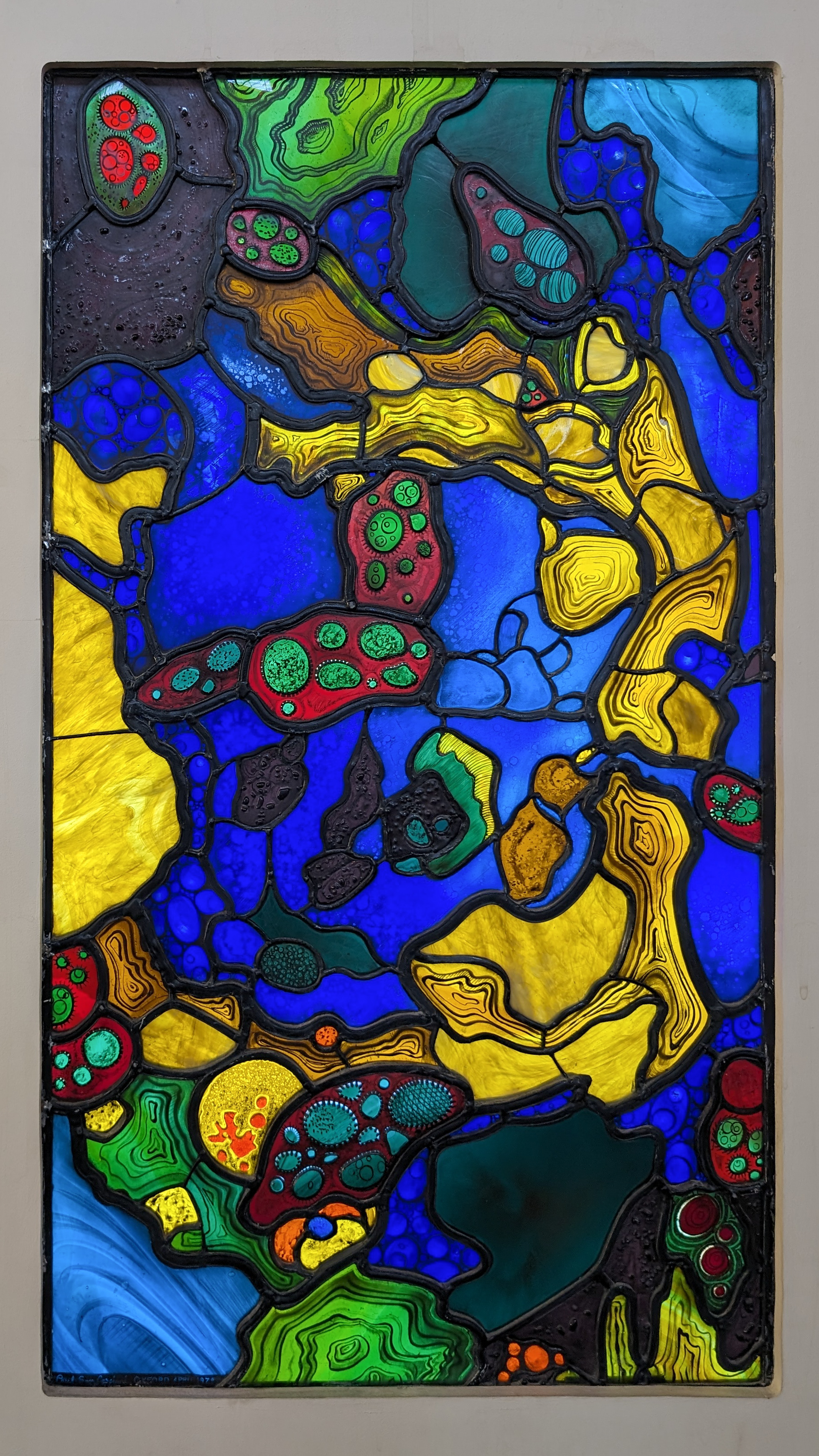
Paul San Casciani, Inner Space (1979)

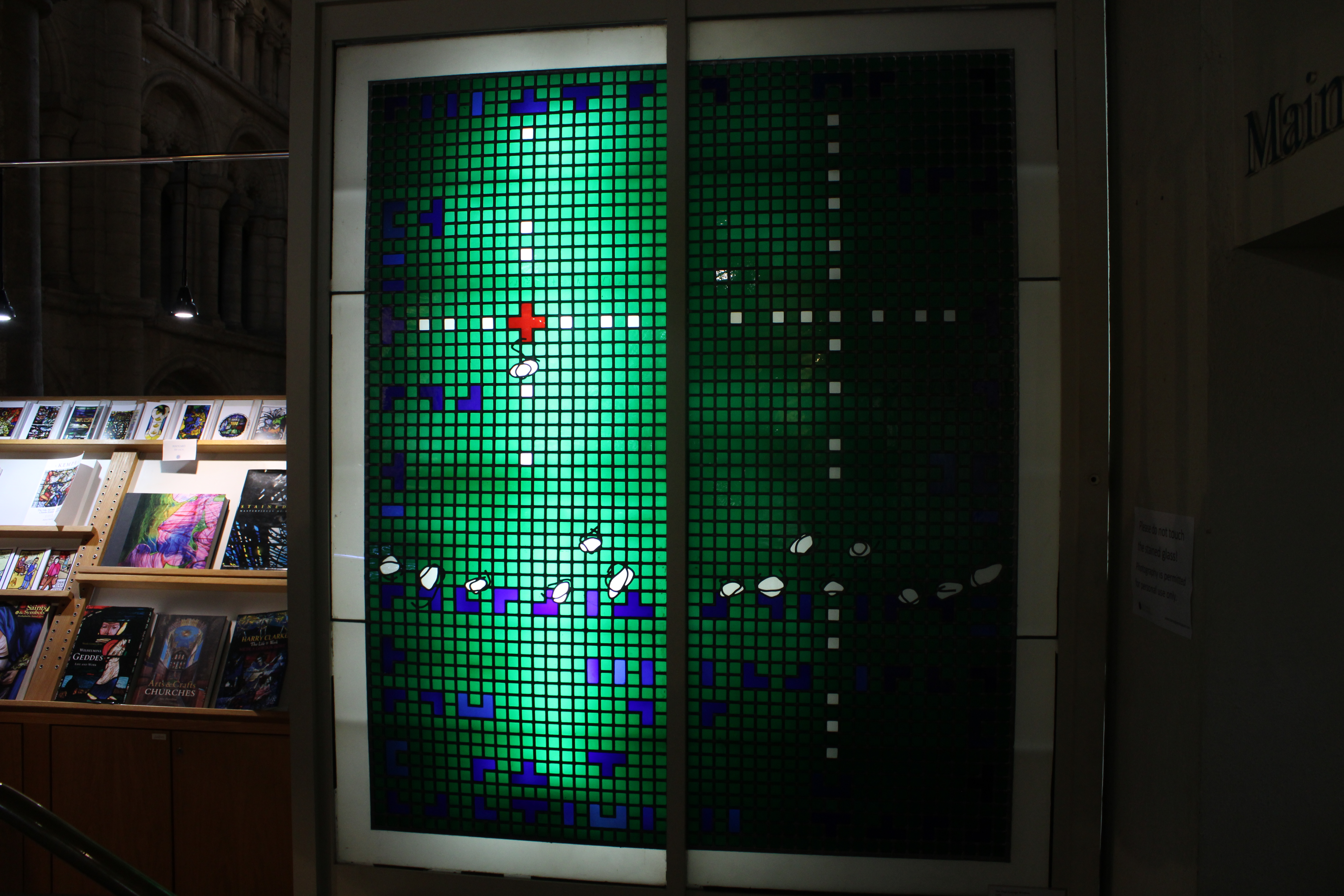
Brian Clarke, Peel Cottage Window (1982)

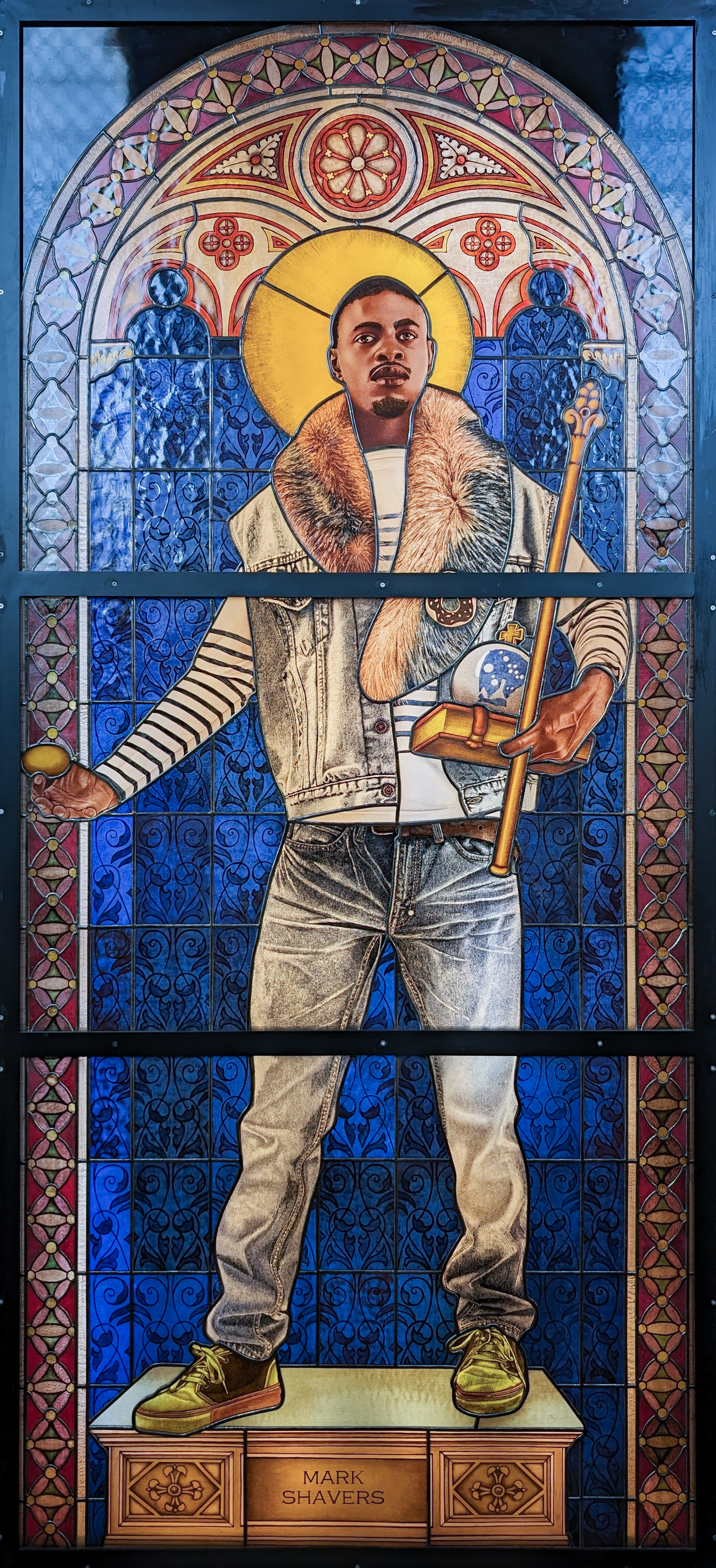
Kehinde Wiley, Saint Adelaide (2014)

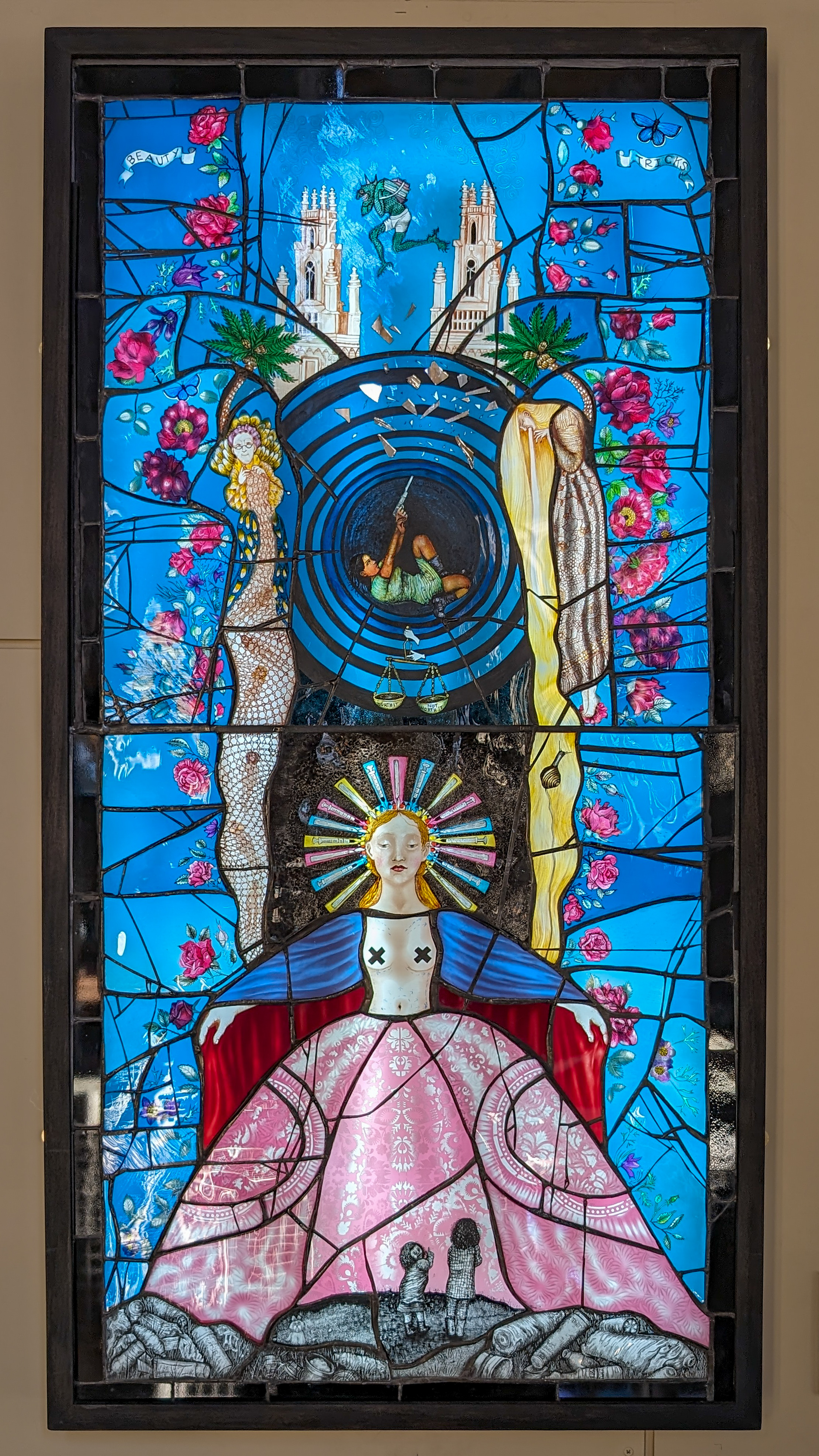
Pinkie Maclure, Beauty Tricks (2017)
