= Gary Blake =

American author

Gary Blake (born July 25, 1944-died March 12, 2019, DelRay, Florida) is a writer on the subject of humor, writing, and teaching. He is also the director of The Communication Workshop, a company dedicated to helping business and technical professionals improve their writing. He is an author in the field of technical writing.

== Biography ==
Blake grew up in Bronxville, New York. He received a B.S. degree in speech and theater in 1966 from the University of Wisconsin-Madison and a M.S. a year later. Blake received a Ph.D. from City University of New York in 1973.

While teaching at Hunter College in New York and Baruch College, Blake wrote his first book, The Status Book (1978) and began writing for Travel and Leisure, Glamour, Family Circle, and other magazines.

Blake has presented writing seminars at organizations in the U.S., UK, Bermuda, and Canada. His clients include The Port Authority of New York and New Jersey, Siemens, CNA, Liberty Mutual, Motorola and the US Department of Agriculture. He has written 11 books including The Elements of Business Writing and The Elements of Technical Writing, both published in 1993 and written with Robert W. Bly.

His most recent book, published in July 2012, is A Freudian Slip Is When You Say One Thing but Mean Your Mother: 879 Funny, Funky, Hip, and Hilarious Puns.

Blake has written articles in the insurance industry for Claims Magazine and other insurance periodicals; he has developed a course in claims writing for Claims Adjusters and Examiners.

He lives in Great Neck, New York.
