= Charles A. Pearson =

Charles A. Pearson may refer to:

- Charles Anthony Pearson (born 1956), younger son of the Third Viscount Cowdray and owner of Dunecht estate in Aberdeenshire
- Charles A. Pearson, mayor of Anaheim, California from 1940 until 1959

== See also ==
- Charles Pearson (disambiguation)
