= Frederick Pearson =

Frederick or Fred Pearson may refer to:

- Frederick Pearson (cricketer) (1880–1963), English cricketer
- Frederick Pearson (U.S. Navy officer) (1842–1890), commander of Alaska, US, in 1882
- Frederick Stark Pearson (1861–1915), American engineer and entrepreneur
- Frederick M. Pearson (1827–1876), Canadian businessman and politician
- Fred Pearson (ice hockey) (1923–2009), American ice hockey player

== See also ==
- Frederick Pearson Treadwell (1857–1918), American chemist
