= Daniel Pearson =

Daniel Pearson may refer to:

- Daniel Pearson (actor) (born 1996), English actor and presenter
- Daniel Pearson (musician) (born 1982), English musician and songwriter
- Daniel Pearson (cyclist) (born 1994), Welsh cyclist
- Daniel R. Pearson, commissioner and former chairman of the United States International Trade Commission

== See also ==
- Danny Pearson (disambiguation)
- Dan Pearson (disambiguation)
