= Harry Pearson =

Harry Pearson may refer to:

- Harry Pearson (cricketer) (1851–1903), English cricketer
- Harry Pearson (footballer, born 1880), English footballer, see List of Bury F.C. players (25–99 appearances)
- Harry Pearson (audio critic) (1937–2014), American critic
- Harry Pearson (journalist) (born 1961), English sports writer
- Harry Pearson, character in Baby Love (1968 film)

== See also ==
- Harold Pearson (disambiguation)
- Henry Pearson (disambiguation)
