= Anthony Pearson =

Anthony Pearson may refer to:

- Anthony Pearson (martyr) (died 1543), English Protestant martyr, executed for heresy
- Anthony Pearson (Quaker) (1628–c. 1670), English Quaker
- Tony Pearson (cricketer) (born 1941), former English cricketer
- Tony Pearson (bodybuilder) (born 1957), American bodybuilding champion
