= Rick Pearson =

Rick Pearson may refer to:

- Rick Pearson (golfer) (born 1958), American golfer
- Richard Pearson (film editor) (born 1961), American film editor
- Ricky Pearson (born 1957), former NASCAR crew chief

== See also ==
- Ricky Pearson (born 1970), English footballer
- Richard Pearson (disambiguation)
