= Stoystown Historic District =

Historic district in Pennsylvania, United States

- U.S. National Register of Historic Places
- U.S. Historic district
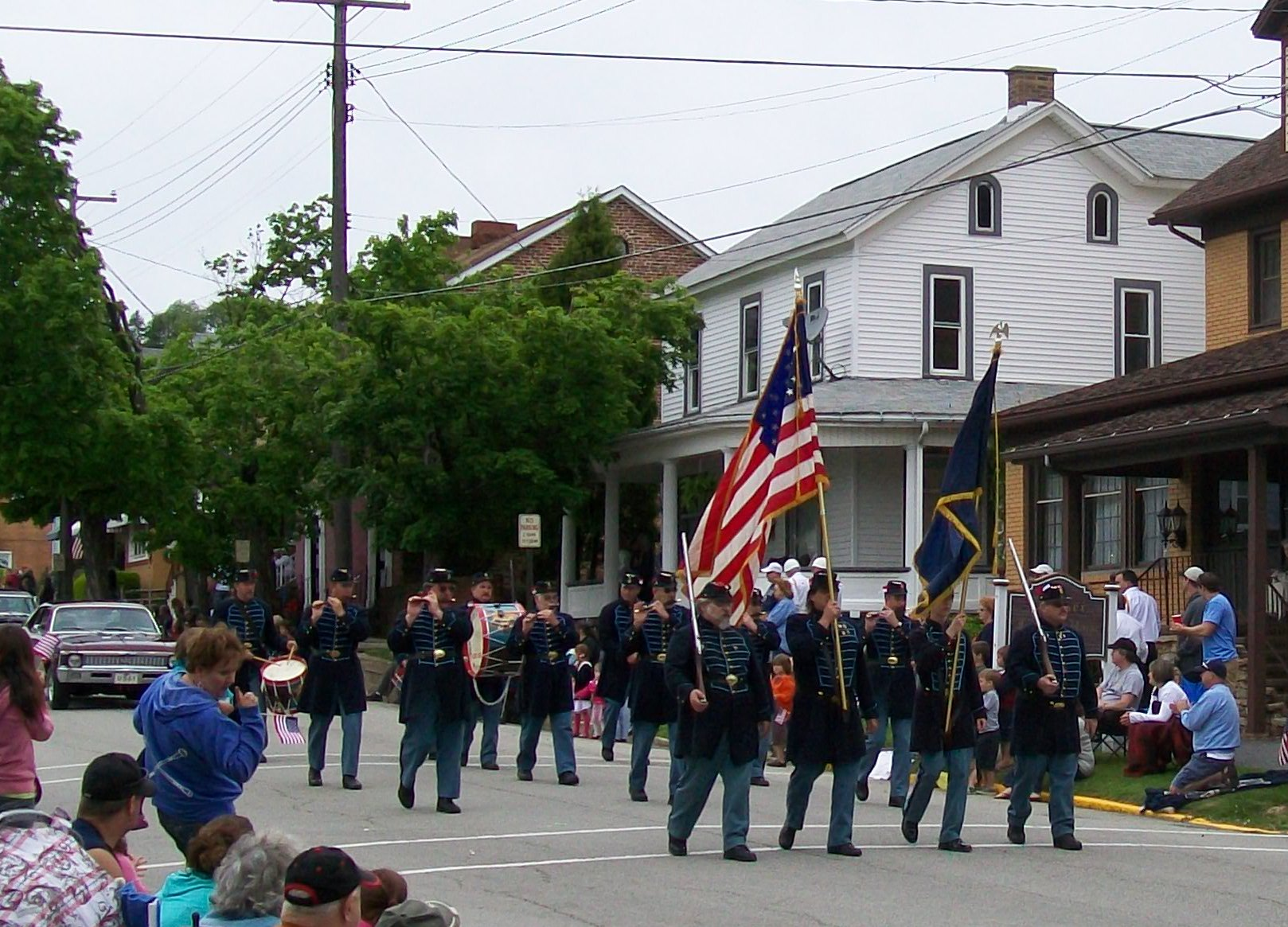
- Memorial Day is Stoystown

- Location within Pennsylvania Location within the United States
- Location: Roughly bounded by W & E Forbes Rds., E Main St., Meadow St. E Penn Ave, S Sommerset St., W Penn Ave. and W Main St., Stoystown, Pennsylvania
- Coordinates: 40°06′09″N 78°57′16″W
- Area: 30 acres (12 ha)
- Built: 1913
- Architect: Fulton, Calvin; Fulton, Frank J.
- Architectural style: Queen Anne, Bungalow/American craftsman, et al.
- MPS: Lincoln Highway Heritage Corridor Historic Resources: Franklin to Westmoreland Counties MPS
- NRHP reference No.: 01000605
- Added to NRHP: September 7, 2001

The Stoystown Historic District is a national historic district that is located in Stoystown in Somerset County, Pennsylvania.

It was listed on the National Register of Historic Places in 2001.

== History and architectural features ==
This district includes eighty-one contributing buildings, two contributing sites, and one contributing object. It encompasses central business district and surrounding residential areas in Stoystown with structures that date primarily from the late-nineteenth and early-twentieth centuries.

Notable non-residential buildings include the Grace Lutheran Church (1888), St. Paul's United Church of Christ (1897), the John Griffin Building (c. 1880), the Laurel Bank (1922), the former Custer House (c. 1830/1870), the H.J. Specht Hardware building (c. 1920), the former IOOF Hall (c. 1900), and a former public school (1929).

The contributing sites are the Union Cemetery (c. 1796) and Stoystown-Quemahoning Township Area Recreation Park (c. 1930). The contributing object is a Lincoln Highway marker (1928).

Located in the district but listed separately is the Hite House, which dates to 1853.

It was listed on the National Register of Historic Places in 2001.
