= Hugh Pearson =

Hugh Pearson may refer to:

- Hugh Pearson (canon of Windsor) (1817–1882), vicar of Sonning and canon at Windsor
- Hugh Pearson (dean of Salisbury) (1776–1856), his father, Anglican priest
- Hugh Pearson (racing driver), American NASCAR driver, see 1975 Los Angeles Times 500

== See also ==
- Pearson (surname)
