= Bryan Pearson =

Bryan Pearson may refer to:

- Bryan Pearson (politician) (1934–2016), Canadian politician
- Bryan Pearson (businessman), CEO and President of LoyaltyOne
- Bryan Pearson (character), a character from the sitcom The Bill Engvall Show

== See also ==
- Brian Pearson (disambiguation)
