= Stuart Pearson (disambiguation) =

Stuart Pearson (born 1949) is an English footballer.

Stuart Pearson may also refer to:

- Stuart Pearson (Ireland) (born c. 1984), Irish person
- Stuart Pearson, CEO of Langbar International
- Stuart Pearson, character in Aliens in the Attic
- Stuart Pearson (boxer) (1934–2015), English boxer
- Stuart Pearson Wright (born 1975), English artist
