= Hite House =

- U.S. National Register of Historic Places
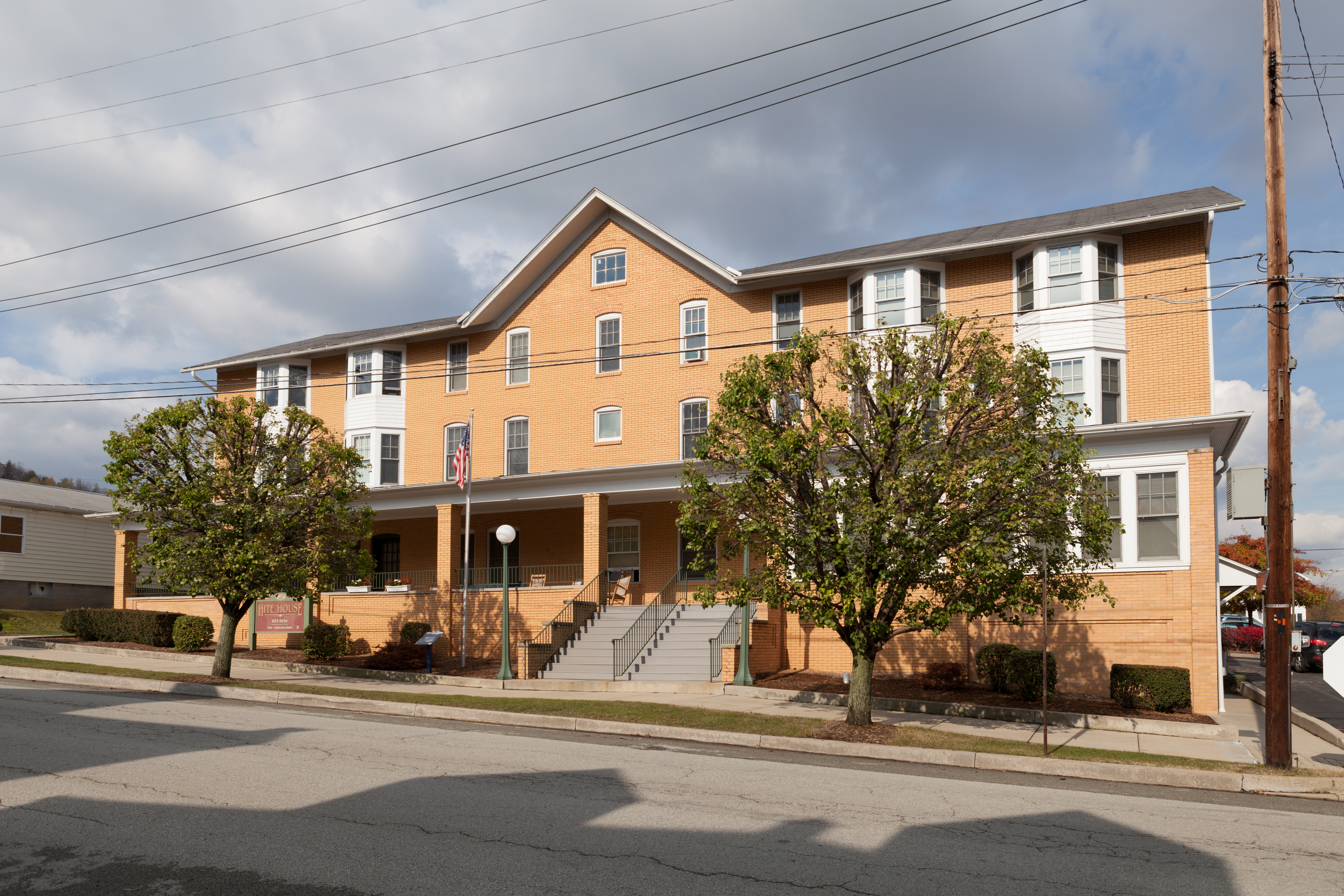
- The house in October 2014

- Location within Pennsylvania Location within the United States
- Location: 121 W. Main St., Stoystown, Pennsylvania
- Coordinates: 40°6′13″N 78°57′17″W
- Area: less than one acre
- Built: 1853, c. 1914, 1920
- MPS: Lincoln Highway Heritage Corridor Historic Resources: Franklin to Westmoreland Counties MPS
- NRHP reference No.: 98001428
- Added to NRHP: November 23, 1998

Hite House is an historic hotel building which is located in Stoystown, Somerset County, Pennsylvania.

Part of the Stoystown Historic District, it was added to the National Register of Historic Places in 1998.

== History and architectural features ==
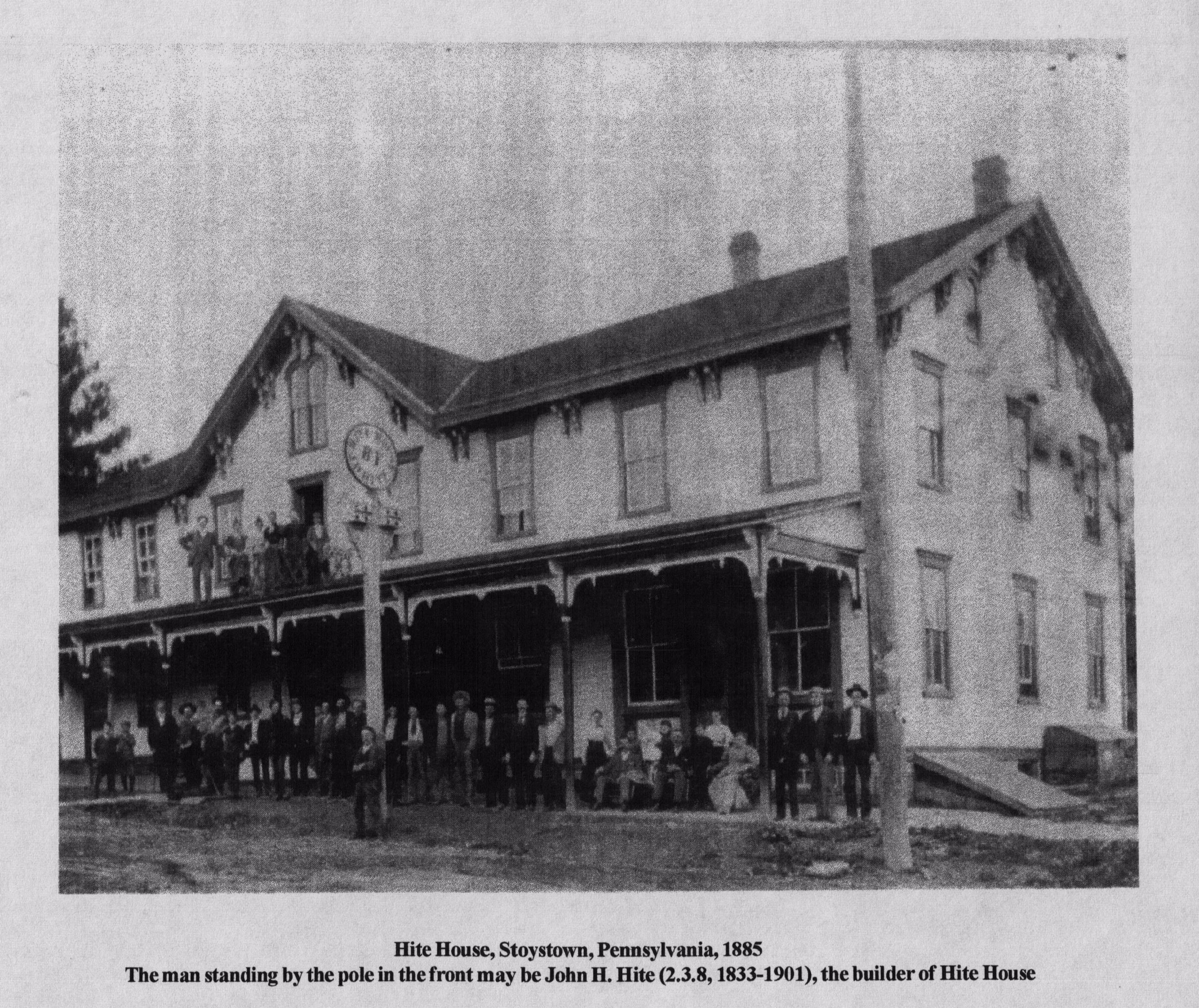

A 3 1/2-story, L-shaped, wood-frame building with a brick veneer on a stone foundation, Hite House features a twelve-foot-deep, one-story porch across its front facade. The original building was built in 1853 by John H. Hite, and was then extensively enlarged and remodeled sometime around 1914, and again in 1920.
