= Philip Zimmerman =

American icon painter

- Born: Stoystown, Pennsylvania, U.S.

Philip Zimmerman is an American Orthodox Christian icon painter.

== Life ==
Zimmerman was born in Stoystown, Pennsylvania to a Calvinist family. He became interested in Orthodox icons at age 12, following a field trip to an Orthodox cathedral. He attended Indiana University of Pennsylvania, where he converted to Eastern Orthodoxy.

Zimmerman studied icon painting for seven years under Rev. Richard Osacky, who was later consecrated bishop and known as Archbishop Job of Chicago and the Midwest, Orthodox Church in America.

After finishing college, he taught art in Rockwood, Pennsylvania for 14 years. He began offering icon-painting workshops in 1989, which saw great success. He has also taught workshops in Hungary, Slovakia, Poland, and Russia, beginning after the collapse of the Soviet Union. In the mid 1990s, he converted an empty Kingdom Hall in New Florence to a studio, called the St. John of Damascus School of Sacred Art.
