= Timothy R. Hawthorne =

American marketeer

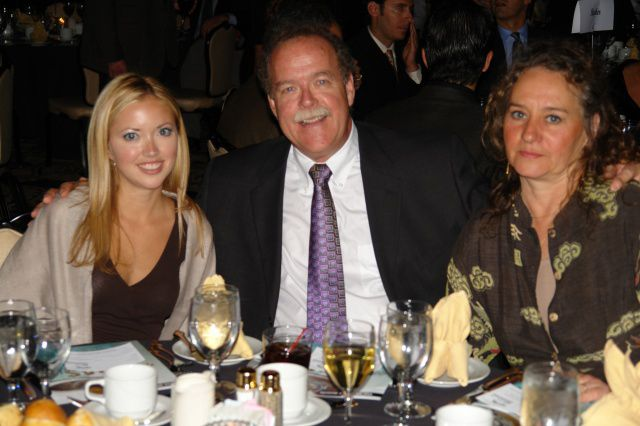
- Hawthorne with his daughter, Jessica, and his wife, Laya, at the 2006 ERA Awards banquet
- Born: June 29, 1950 (age 75); Evanston, Illinois
- Occupations: Founder, chairman, and executive creative director of the advertising agency Hawthorne Direct
- Known for: Pioneering work in direct-response television advertising; co-founder, Electronic Retailing Association (1991); author of The Complete Guide to Infomercial Marketing (1997) and Anatomy of a Winning Infomercial (DVD, 2005)

Timothy R. Hawthorne (born June 29, 1950) is a businessperson known for his expertise in direct response marketing, specializing in direct response television (DRTV). He founded Hawthorne Direct, the first advertising agency dedicated to producing infomercials. He is the author of The Complete Guide to Infomercial Marketing. He has been called "the king of the infomercial."

== Education and early career ==
Hawthorne graduated cum laude from Harvard University in 1973, majoring in psychology. After learning about documentary film production with CBS and NBC network affiliate news divisions in Minneapolis and Philadelphia, he founded Hawthorne Productions in 1980 and was accepted into the Directors Guild of America. Early clients included the prime-time programs Real People and That’s Incredible! and the syndicated shows You Asked for It, Ripley's Believe It or Not!, and Entertainment Tonight. He also contributed programs to the Cable Health Network.

== DRTV career ==
In October 1984, Hawthorne took $25,000 in start-up capital to co-found Fairfield Television Enterprises, Inc., a direct-response television marketing company. Hawthorne served as executive producer of the fourth long-form TV commercial to air in the modern era—a real estate home-study program that dominated the fledgling industry for two years, grossing over $60 million in sales.

In July 1986, Hawthorne founded Hawthorne Communications, an advertising agency focused exclusively on direct response television (DRTV). The company produced early DRTV programs for such established brands as Apple, Nissan, and Time-Life. Hawthorne joined with eight colleagues in 1991 to found the National Infomercial Marketing Association (NIMA). NIMA became the Electronic Retailing Association in 1997.

In 1995, Hawthorne was named one of ResponseTV's "25 most influential people in DRTV," and in 1996, USA Today and Ernst & Young recognized him as "Entrepreneur of the Year" for the Iowa/Nebraska region. In 1997, Hawthorne re-branded his agency as Hawthorne Direct. In 2001, Hawthorne and Time Life Direct won Questar's 'Best of Show' award for Julia Havey's "Take It Off w/ Julia" weight-loss informercial, the only weight-loss infomercial ever filmed by Time Life Direct.

== DRTV firsts ==
Hawthorne is credited with a number of DRTV industry firsts. He was the first advocate of major brand advertisers incorporating long-form TV advertising in their media mix. He wrote the industry's most cited full-length textbook. He produced or managed the first infomercial for a Fortune 500 company (Time-Life), for a major credit card company (Discover Card), and a major health insurance company (Blue Cross). He created the first infomercial campaign for driving retail sales for an established brand (Braun). He oversaw the development of TimeTrack, the first software program dedicated to analyzing sales and viewership performance of purchased media time slots. He introduced the Media Efficiency Ratio (MER) key performance indicator, now a standard industry metric. He signed the first long-term bulk media contract with a national cable network, Discovery Channel (in 1985) for the airing of DRTV commercials, published the first newsletter devoted to DRTV (The 1-800 Report), and introduced the “three calls-to-action” formula—a staple in DRTV. He was the first to produce a 30-minute “documercial” (using a documentary format to sell products) and the first to introduce a “promomercial” (a 30-minute program designed to promote a different television program—in this case, NBC’s Jag).

== Publications ==
BOOKS

- The Complete Guide to Infomercial Marketing, NTC Business Books, 1997 (updated by Hawthorne Direct in 2005 and 2008).
- The ABCs of DRTV, Hawthorne Direct, 2006.
- The ABCs of Interactive Advertising, Hawthorne Direct, 2006.

Hawthorne has also contributed content or chapters for nine direct-marketing texts, including Seth Godin's eMarketing (1995), Frank Cannella's Infomercial Insights (1995), and Robert W. Bly's The Complete Idiot's Guide to Direct Marketing (2001).
