= Thomas Pearson =

Thomas, Tom or Tommy Pearson may refer to:

- Thomas Pearson (book collector) (c. 1740–1781), British army officer, traveller, and book collector
- Thomas Pearson (cricketer) (1851–1935), English cricketer
- Thomas Pearson (British Columbia politician) (1859–1939), Canadian politician
- Tom Pearson (footballer) (1866–1918), English footballer
- Thomas Pearson (bishop) (1870–1938), English catholic bishop
- Tom Pearson (rugby union, born 1872) (1872–1957), Welsh rugby union player
- Tom Pearson (rugby union, born 1926) (1926–2010), Scottish rugby union player
- Tom Pearson (rugby union, born 1999) English rugby union player
- T. Gilbert Pearson (Thomas Gilbert Pearson, 1873–1943), American conservationist
- Tommy Pearson (1913–1999), Scottish footballer and manager
- Thomas Pearson (British Army officer, born 1782) (1782–1847)
- Thomas Pearson (British Army officer, born 1914) (1914–2019)
- T. R. Pearson (Thomas Reid Pearson, born 1956), American writer
- Thomas Hooke Pearson (1806–1892), British Army general
- Tom Pearson (multidisciplinary_artist), American poet and theater artist

== See also ==
- Thomas Person (1733–1800), American politician and military officer
- Tom Pierson, American composer
