= Eglington Margaret Pearson =

British artist (1746–1823)

Eglington Margaret Pearson (née Paterson; baptised 5 November 1746 – 14 February 1823) was an English stained glass painter.

== Biography ==
Pearson was the daughter of Samuel Paterson, a noted London bookseller. Her mother, whose maiden name was Hamilton, was the niece of the Countess of Eglingon (previously spelt Eglington). Her father also dealt in antique stained glass, and is reported in the 1764 edition of Dossie's Handmaid to the Arts as having set up his own stained glass factory. She married James Pearson, also a glass painter at St Martin's in the Fields, London, in 1768.

Pearson and her husband came to public attention through works shown at the Society of Artists of Great Britain in its exhibitions in 1775-77. The works she showed there were mostly depictions of birds, especially parrots and parakeets. Most of her output consisted of works on a single sheet of glass. Following the practice of the time, the Pearsons used a technique in which the image was painted in enamels on sheets of colourless glass and then fired.

The Pearsons exhibited regularly throughout the 1780s and 1790s at their homes in London, first in Church Street, Westminster, and later in Great Newport Street. They also showed at the new Pantheon in Oxford Street. In the last years of the 18th century Pearson widened her repertoire to include copies on glass of famous paintings, and early in 1791 she finished the first of the three sets she painted after the seven Raphael Cartoons, then at Windsor Castle. The World for April 1791 described it as "forming the most capital Set of Pictures for a private Chapel that has ever yet appeared in this species of Painting." One of the two sets she produced at around this time was bought by the Marquess of Lansdowne, and the other by Sir Gregory Page Turner. One panel of Lansdowne's set survives at Bowood House. She finished the third about 18 months before her death. The catalogue of an exhibition held by the Pearsons in 1821 was entitled Celebrated Cartoons of Raphael, and Various Other Beautiful Specimens, by Mr. and Mrs. Pearson, Appointed Painters to Her Majesty, on Glass, in Vitrified Colours, at No. 112, Great Russell-Street, Bloomsbury.

Although the couple usually worked on separate pieces they occasionally collaborated, as on their stained glass copy after Carlo Maratti's Salutation, shown in 1775. A later joint work was one after Guido Reni’s Aurora, shown in London in 1793.

She died on 14 February 1823. There are examples of her work in the Victoria and Albert Museum and the Corning Museum of Glass. Her copy of The Blacksmith’s Shop by Joseph Wright of Derby, dated 1789, is at Burghley House.
