= Peter Pearson =

Peter Pearson may refer to:

- P. C. "Pete" Pearson (1877–1929), Australian born elephant hunter and game ranger in East Africa
- Peter Pearson (director) (1938–2025), Canadian film director and screenwriter
- Peter Pearson (British Army officer) (born 1954), former British Army officer
- Peter Pearson (painter, born 1955), Irish artist, author, historian, and conservationist
- Peter Pearson (painter, born 1957), American icon painter, author and teacher
- Peter Pearson (footballer) (born 1995), Saint Lucian footballer
- Peter Pearson (tennis) (born 1955), American tennis player
- Peter William Pearson, Canadian politician
