= Dan Pearson =

Dan Pearson may refer to:

- Dan Pearson, bassist for American Music Club
- Dan Pearson (garden designer) (born 1964), English garden designer

== See also ==
- Danny Pearson (disambiguation)
- Daniel Pearson (disambiguation)
