= Brian Pearson =

Brian Pearson may refer to:

- Brian Pearson, singer in The Critics Group
- Brian Pearson, cinematographer of The Karate Dog

== See also ==
- Bryan Pearson (disambiguation)
