= Joe Pearson =

Joe Pearson may refer to:

- Joe Pearson (footballer) (1877–1946), English footballer
- Joe Pearson (politician), member of the Indiana House of Representatives

== See also ==
- Joseph Pearson (disambiguation)
