= Colin Pearson =

Colin Pearson may refer to:

- Colin Pearson, Baron Pearson (1899–1980), Canadian-born English lawyer and judge
- Colin Pearson (potter) (1923–2007), English potter
- Colin Pearson, English record producer, known for his production work for Alphaville
