= William Pearson =

William Pearson may refer to:

- William Pearson (astronomer) (1767–1847), English astronomer who helped found the Royal Astronomical Society
- William Pearson (baritone) (1934–1995), American singer
- William Pearson (cricketer) (1912–1987), Australian cricketer
- William Pearson (priest) (1662–1715), Archdeacon of Nottingham
- William Pearson (scientist), professor of biochemistry and molecular genetics in the School of Medicine at the University of Virginia
- William Pearson (surveyor) (1829–1905), surveyor in South Australia
- William Pearson (swimmer) (1916–2004), English swimmer
- William Pearson (trade unionist) (1896–1956), Scottish trade unionist and communist activist
- William Pearson (New Hampshire politician), member of the New Hampshire House of Representatives
- William Pearson Sr. (1818–1893), member of Victorian Legislative Assembly and Council, racehorse owner
- William Pearson Jr. (1864–1919), son of the above, member of the Victorian Legislative Council
- William Burton Pearson (1921–), Canadian crystallographer, known for Pearson symbol
- William Fisher Pearson (1854–1888), New Zealand politician
- William Gaston Pearson (1858–1947), African American educator and businessman
- William Henry Pearson (1849–1923), English botanist
- William Pearson (baritone) (1934–1995), American baritone
- William Pearson (British politician) (1882–1963), British Member of Parliament for Jarrow
- William W. Pearson (1881–1923), British teacher, secretary of Rabindranath Tagore
- Peter William Pearson, Canadian politician

== See also ==
- Bill Pearson (disambiguation)
- Billy Pearson (1920–2002), jockey
- Billy Pearson (footballer) (1921–2009), football winger for Chester City
- Will Pearson (born 1983), co-founder of mental floss, an American magazine
