= Thomas Pearson (book collector) =

Major Thomas Pearson (c. 1740?–1781) was a British army officer, traveller and book collector who held offices in the East Indies. His portrait was painted by George Romney, whose son John described him in his Memoirs of the Life and Works of George Romney as "a gentleman of elegant and cultivated mind, who wisely and praise-worthily applied the riches which he had acquired in India, to the advancement of science ..." The Romney portrait of Pearson is in the collection of Stan Hywet Hall and Gardens, Akron, Ohio.

== Biography ==
Pearson was born at Cote Green, near Burton-in-Kendal, Westmorland. He was educated at Burton, and came to London about 1756 to fill a post in the Navy Office, which he resigned in 1760.

In the course of the following year he left England, having obtained a cadetship on the Bengal Establishment, in which he rose to the rank of major. He distinguished himself on several occasions, and was particularly noticed by Lord Clive, to whom he adhered during the mutiny fomented by Sir Robert Fletcher, at whose trial he held the office of Judge Advocate.

In 1767 Pearson married a sister of Eyles Irwin, the traveller and writer. This lady died in the following year, and an epitaph inscribed to her memory may be found, together with other poetical pieces by Pearson, in vol. iv. of Pearch's Collection of Poems.

Pearson returned to England in August 1770 with Governor Harry Verelst, under whom he had acted as Military Secretary, and built a house for himself at Burton, in which he collected a very extensive library, consisting of works on the history, antiquities, topography, and heraldry of Great Britain and Ireland, foreign history, voyages and travels, natural history, etc., but it was principally remarkable for the large number of books in all branches of old English literature, and it was especially rich in the works of the early poets and dramatists.

In 1776 Pearson again went to India, but after a residence there of five years he fell a victim to the effects of the climate, and died at Calcutta on 5 August 1781.

Some years after his death his library was brought from Westmoreland, and sold on 14 April 1788, and twenty-two following days, by T. and J. Egerton at their auction room in Scotland Yard.
