= Edward Pearson =

Edward Pearson may refer to:

- Edward Pearson (theologian) (1756–1811), English academic and theologian, master of Sidney Sussex College, Cambridge
- Edward J. Pearson (1863–1928), president of the New York, New Haven and Hartford Railroad
- Edward Nathan Pearson (1859–1924), New Hampshire secretary of state
- Edward W. Pearson Sr. (1872–1946), African American entrepreneur
- Edward P. Pearson (1837–1915), American brigadier general in the American Civil War and the Spanish–American War
- Edward Pearson (soccer), member of the National Soccer Hall of Fame
