= Robert Pearson =

Robert Pearson may refer to:

- Robert Pearson (politician) (1879–1956), Canadian politician
- Robert Pearson (stockbroker) (1871–1954), Scottish cricketer, lawyer and stockbroker
- Robert Pearson (restaurateur) (1936–2024), British-born American restaurateur
- Robert E. Pearson (1928–2009), American producer
- W. Robert Pearson (born 1943), American diplomat
- Rob Pearson (Robert Gordon Pearson, born 1971), Canadian ice hockey player
- Bob Pearson (Robert Alexander Pearson, 1907–1985), of the English variety act Bob and Alf Pearson
- Robert Pearson (Air Canada Flight 143), captain of a domestic passenger flight that ran out of fuel mid-flight

== See also ==
- Robert Peirson (1821–1891), English physicist
- Robert Person (born 1969), Major League Baseball pitcher
