= Valentin Streltsov =

Icon painter

Valentin Streltsov is a contemporary icon painter, working in the classical Byzantine style. He graduated from the State Art School (Ukraine) and State College of Decorative and Applied Arts in Lviv, Ukraine. Also studied privately monumental painting with prominent Ukrainian painters: S. Shatalin, Z. Bobrik, A. Kotenko. Since 1989 Valentin decorated numerous Orthodox and Byzantine Catholic churches in North America with Byzantine style murals, Iconostases, traditional Icons, stained glass windows and mosaics. Also painted official portrait for Cardinal Lubachivsky and His Coat of arms.

Awards and recognitions:

- While working with Emil Telizin (Emil's Design LTD.) designed award-winning mosaics for the St. Athanasius Ukrainian Catholic Church in Regina, Saskatchewan (Smithsonian institution award for the best contemporary Byzantine style mosaics in North America).
- 2007 - Was awarded Pontifical medal by Pope Benedict XVI after the decoration of the Papal Chapel of Apostolic Nunciate in Ottawa (Canada).

Presently Valentin continues to work on iconographic murals and teaching icon painting workshops (master-classes).
