= Chris Pearson =

Chris or Christopher Pearson may refer to:

- Chris Pearson (boxer) (born 1990), American boxer
- Chris Pearson (politician) (1931–2014), first premier of the Yukon
- Christopher Pearson (Vermont politician) (born 1973), Vermont state legislator
- Christopher Pearson (journalist) (1951–2013), Australian journalist
- Christopher Pearson (footballer) (born 2003), Jamaican footballer
