= Ian Pearson (disambiguation) =

Ian Pearson (born 1959) is a British politician.

Ian Pearson may also refer to:

- Ian Pearson (badminton) (born 1974), English badminton player
- Ian Pearson (footballer) (born 1934), Australian rules footballer
