= Gary Pearson =

Gary Pearson may refer to:

- Gary Pearson (comedian), Canadian comedian
- Gary Pearson (footballer) (1976–2022), English footballer
