= Frederick Pearson Treadwell =

American chemist (1857–1918)

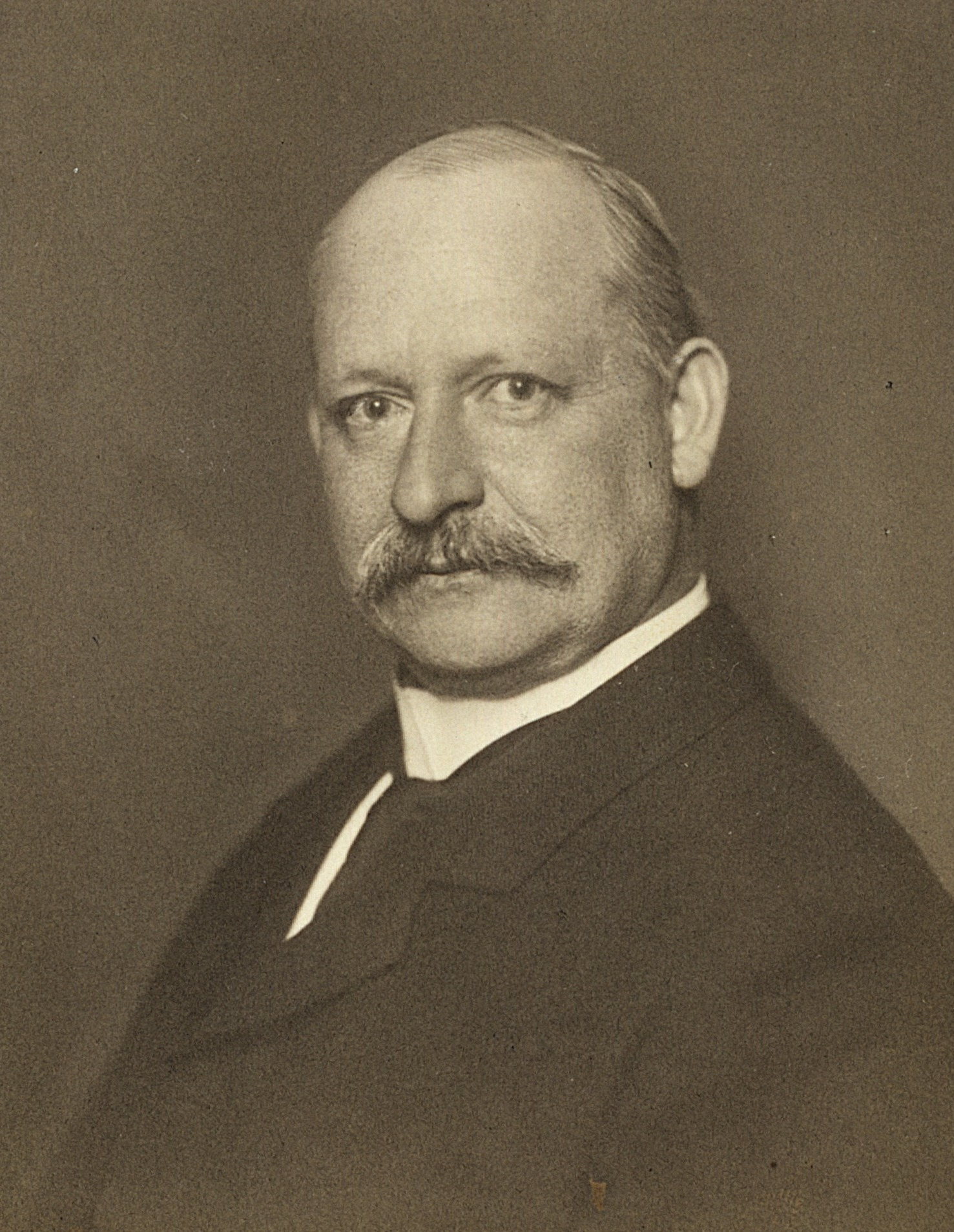
Fredrick Pearson Treadwell, c. 1919

Frederick Pearson Treadwell (1857 in Portsmouth NH – 24 June 1918 in Zürich) was an American analytical chemist working in Switzerland.

== Life ==
F.P. Treadwell studied chemistry in Heidelberg (Germany) under Robert Bunsen. He graduated with a doctoral degree in 1878 and was lecture assistant to Bunsen from 1878-1881. Treadwell became Privatdozent in analytical chemistry at ETH Zürich in 1882, Titularprofessor in 1885, and Ordinarius (full professor) in 1893, a post he held until his sudden death by "heart disease" in 1918. His son William Dupré Treadwell followed him on his position at ETH.

== Works ==
In 1882, he had already published a widely recognized reference work with Victor Meyer (1848–1897), called Tables for Qualitative Analysis. But F.P. Treadwell was especially well known for his textbook of analytical chemistry. The "Treadwell" was in common use in Universities, with editions spanning up to 1949. It was translated into French, Italian, English, Serbo-Croat, and Spanish. Later editions were edited by his son W.D. Treadwell.

- Tables for Qualitative Analysis (German:Tabellen zur Qualitativen Analyse). (1882–1947, with V. Meyer) Digital 8th edition from 1918 by the University and State Library Düsseldorf
- Analytical Chemistry (German: Kurzes Lehrbuch der analytischen Chemie). (1899–1949, Leipzig and Vienna, Deuticke; 2 volumes)
- Kurzes Lehrbuch der analytischen Chemie. Deuticke, Leipzig 1907.
  - 1. Qualitative Analyse. 5., verm. u. verb. Aufl.1907
  - 2. Quantitative Analyse. 5., verm. u. verb. Aufl.1911
  - 2. Quantitative Analyse. 4., verm. und verb. Aufl., (Doppelaufl.)1907

== Literature ==
- G. Schwarzenbach (1959). Treadwell, William (1885–1959). Helvetica Chimica Acta 42(7):2757-2760.
- Anonymous (1918). Scientific Notes and News. Science 48(1236):243-247.
