= Harry Pearson (cricketer) =

English cricketer

Harry Eyre Pearson (7 August 1851 – 8 July 1903) was an English first-class cricketer, who played four matches for Yorkshire County Cricket Club between 1878 and 1880.

Born in Attercliffe, Sheffield, Yorkshire, England, Pearson was a right arm round arm bowler, who bowled both pace and spin and took 5 wickets at an average of 18.00, with a best return of 4 for 37 against Surrey. A right-handed batsman, he scored 31 runs with a highest score of 10 not out against Middlesex.

Pearson died in July 1903, in Nether Edge, Sheffield.
