= Paul Pearson =

Paul Pearson may refer to:

- Paul G. Pearson (1926–2000), president of Miami University
- Paul Martin Pearson (1871–1938), governor of the United States Virgin Islands
- Paul Pearson (Canadian football) (born 1957), Canadian football slotback
