= Danny Pearson =

Danny Pearson may refer to:

- Danny Pearson (musician) (1953–2018), American composer and singer-songwriter
- Danny Pearson (politician) (born 1973), Australian politician
- Danny Pearson, bass guitar player for the indie rock band American Music Club

== See also ==
- Dan Pearson (disambiguation)
- Daniel Pearson (disambiguation)
