= Benjamin Pearson =

Benjamin or Ben Pearson may refer to:

- Ben Pearson (bowyer) (1898–1971), American archer, bowyer and fletcher who started the first American company to mass-produce archery equipment
- Ben Pearson (footballer) (born 1995), English footballer
- Benjamin Franklin Pearson (1855–1912), Canadian lawyer, entrepreneur and politician
