= Daniel Pearson (musician) =

English musician

Daniel Pearson (born 2 July 1982) is an English musician and songwriter from Kingston upon Hull, England. He has released two studio albums as a solo artist, and plays guitar, bass guitar, keyboards and percussion on his releases, which have been acclaimed by national and international press and radio. He is primarily known as an indie/folk rock artist.

== Early career and bands (1997–2010) ==
=== Southall (1997–2001) ===
At the age of 16, Pearson formed his first band with school friends. They released a series of limited-run studio recordings and played their first live shows at local musical landmark, The New Adelphi Club. The band also played various regional and University music festivals in Kingston upon Hull and Sheffield and were reviewed by local media. The band split in 2001 due to University commitments.

=== First solo recordings (2001–2002) ===
In 2001 Pearson began making a series of self-produced home recordings on a four-track portastudio, citing Bruce Springsteen, Elliott Smith and Ryan Adams as key songwriting influences. These songs had a limited physical release, with Pearson selling CDs at live shows throughout 2001 and 2002. He also moved from East to West Yorkshire (specifically to Leeds) during this period.

=== The Signs (2004–2008) ===
By 2004, Pearson was again eager to explore a full band sound, and so formed a four-piece rock and roll act called Dakota. This band quickly changed their name to The Signs, with Pearson providing lead vocals and guitar. Other members of the band were Sean Hatherley, Scott Coutts and Adam Worthington. The Signs toured across the UK and soon signed a recording contract with Leeds-based indie record label Wardrobe Records, who released their double A-side single Circles/Something To Believe In in 2007. Despite offers from larger record labels, the band split in 2008 after playing support slots with The Pigeon Detectives, The Rifles and One Night Only on tour.

=== The Blueprint and free releases (2008) ===
Throughout 2008, Pearson used the social networking site MySpace to release a series of free solo recordings. He dubbed this project The Blueprint and released a newly written free song every week for six months. Some of the songs from his debut studio album Satellites were written during this period, and Pearson has claimed that this period of intensive creativity refined his songwriting skills as well as attuning him to the power of social media. No official physical release was given for these recordings, though CD copies were sold online to fans.

=== All Those Heroes (2008–2009) ===
Pearson also formed a power-trio with Leeds musicians Mike Quarry and Dan Newsome in 2008, showcasing a more punk-driven alternative rock sound. He was lead vocalist and guitarist and was the main songwriter in the band. The band played live sporadically, including shows with The Glitterati and received airplay from BBC 6Music for their studio recordings.

== Solo work (2010–present) ==
=== Satellites (2010–2011) ===
In July 2010, Pearson recorded his first full studio album at The Soundmill in Leeds, with Ed Heaton as producer. It was released in January 2011 on Pearson's own Saint in the City record label. The album soon received press praise from Uncut Magazine, Drowned in Sound, Shout 4 Music, AllGigs and Leeds Music Scene. Clint Boon at XFM and Tom Robinson at BBC 6Music played songs from the album on their radio shows and NME Radio and Amazing Radio also gave airplay. With Pearson gaining press plaudits in the UK, US and Australian distribution for the album was also arranged in early 2012. Australian national radio station Triple J gave Satellites airplay and the album picked up a series of positive reviews from press in these territories. Pearson played select live shows in England to support the album, and also toured with Michael Kiwanuka, Willy Mason, Chris Helme and Mark Morriss during 2011/2012. Live dates in the USA also promoted the album, with Pearson playing shows in Knoxville, Las Vegas, Los Angeles, Memphis, Nashville, New York and Washington. He also self-produced and edited music videos for the songs Waves in the Sea and One For Conversation during this period.

=== Mercury State (2012–present) ===
In August 2012 Pearson recorded his second studio album with Jeremy Platt, a regular member of his live band, on production duties. Keen to explore and express both the effects of the financial recession and a more stripped-back sound, recording and production of the album was completed in just five days. In advance of the album release, Pearson created a self-shot and edited video for the song Factory Floor. Mercury State was released in January 2013 on Saint in the City Records and was again met with a series of positive reviews. Uncut Magazine awarded it 8/10 with various UK and European magazines and websites praising the new social/political aspect to Pearson's skilled song writing. The album was also acclaimed by the USA-based PopMatters and No Depression sites upon North American release. The songs Medication, Factory Floor and I Still Believe gained airplay on various regional and national radio stations in the UK, Europe and the USA.
