= Fred Pearson (ice hockey) =

American ice hockey player

- Born: March 23, 1923 Beverly, MA, USA
- Died: September 10, 2009 (aged 86)
- Position: Left wing
- Shot: Left
- National team: United States
- Playing career: 1947–1952

Frederick Gordon Neil Pearson (March 23, 1923 – September 10, 2009) was an American ice hockey player who competed in ice hockey at the 1948 Winter Olympics.

Pearson was a member of the American ice hockey team which played eight games but was disqualified, at the 1948 Winter Olympics hosted by St. Moritz, Switzerland.
