= Harold Pearson =

Harold Pearson may refer to:

- Harold Pearson (footballer, born 1901) (1901–1972), English footballer with Southampton and Coventry City
- Harold Pearson (footballer, born 1908) (1908–1994), English football goalkeeper with West Bromwich Albion
- Harold Pearson, 2nd Viscount Cowdray (1882–1933), British peer and Liberal Party politician

== See also ==
- Harry Pearson (disambiguation)
- Henry Harold Welch Pearson (1870–1916), South African botanist
