= Stuart Pearson (Ireland) =

Irish hoaxer

Stuart Pearson (born c. 1984) is an Irish convenience store worker whose name was linked to a number of investment rumours in 2008. In 2009, the claims of Pearson's wealth and investment proposals were reported to have been a hoax.

== Biography ==
In reports published in December 2008, Pearson stated that he was 24 and from Arklow, where his family owned a Burmah petrol station. By 1998 they moved to Carlow where he claimed to own 'The Foundry' nightclub. (In fact, The Foundry is part of the Dinn Rí Hotel complex owned by the McLoughlin family.) Pearson claimed to have qualified as an accountant in Portlaoise around 2008. He moved with his wife and two daughters to County Kilkenny, where he rented a house in Goresbridge and worked in a convenience store in Graiguenamanagh. According to contemporary reports, he was attacked in a robbery on the shop in January 2008. In May 2009, The Irish Times reported that he had separated from his wife, who claimed to have no knowledge of his business dealings; and that locals in Goresbridge were surprised by and sceptical of the reports of Pearson's extreme claim of wealth.

== Purported investments ==
In interviews, Pearson claimed to have inherited money from relatives in 2003. This was reputedly held by trustees until 2008, who were claimed to have invested it in property in Ireland and Britain. The trust was reported to have property in Ireland, to have paid £940m for two retail properties in London, bought several units on Dublin's Grafton Street; and earned up to €800m from an investment in New York City.

In October 2008, Pearson was reported to have been negotiating to buy Taggart Holdings, a housebuilding firm based in Northern Ireland which was in administration with debts reported at €150m. In December 2008, it was reported that he might invest in Aer Lingus, and subsequently that he might launch a takeover offer of up to €900m, funded from a war chest of €1.5–2b. In 2009, he was reported to be planning to build a retirement village in Arklow, and to start an insurance company. He was claimed to be a supporter of several charities, and in April 2009 he proposed to produce a DVD showcasing investment opportunities in the Carlow/Kilkenny region.

In May 2009, all of the claims made by Pearson were reported to be hoaxes, reputedly started to attract "attention". In some reports, Pearson was described as a "Walter Mitty" character who "[did not have] two cents to his name". In other reports, a family member was quoted as stating that Pearson had worked in a fast food take away and as a barman, and was "living on a shoestring".

In August 2009, Pearson was charged with trading without a licence and selling alcohol to underage people.
