= Ryan Pearson =

Ryan Pearson may refer to:

- Ryan Pearson (footballer) (born 1989), Australian footballer
- Ryan W. Pearson (born 1988), American politician in the Rhode Island Senate
- Ryan Pearson (basketball) (born 1990), American basketball player
