= Roger Pearson =

Roger Pearson may refer to:

- Roger Pearson (anthropologist) (born 1927), British anthropologist and far-right political organizer
- Roger Pearson (literary scholar), professor of French at Oxford University
