= Joseph Pearson =

Joseph Pearson may refer to:

- Joseph Pearson (politician) (1776–1834), U.S. representative from North Carolina
- Joseph Pearson (zoologist) (1881–1971), British-born zoologist and marine biologist
- Joseph Pearson (footballer) (1868–?), English footballer
- Joseph Pearson (cricketer) (1860–1892), English cricketer
- Joseph Pearson (writer) (born 1975), Canadian essayist, cultural historian, and journalist
- Joseph Thurman Pearson Jr., American landscape and portrait painter
- Joseph Pearson (New Hampshire politician), (1737-1823) New Hampshire secretary of state

== See also ==
- Joe Pearson (disambiguation)
