= Henry Pearson =

Henry Pearson may refer to:

- Henry Pearson (American football) (born 1999), American football player
- Henry C. Pearson (1914–2006), American painter
- Henry Harold Welch Pearson (1870–1916), British-born South African botanist
- Henry Hugh Pearson (1815–1873), English composer
- Henry John Pearson (1850–1913), British ornithologist and explorer of the European Arctic
- Henry Shepherd Pearson (c.1775–1840), acting Governor of Penang

== See also ==
- Harry Pearson (disambiguation)
