= Ronald Pearson =

American actor and model (1959–2001)

- Born: Ronald L. Pearson; October 10, 1959; Berkeley, California, U.S.
- Died: December 10, 2001 (aged 42); San Francisco, U.S.
- Other name: Ron Pearson
- Education: College Park High School
- Alma mater: City College of San Francisco
- Occupations: Actor; Model; Director
- Years active: 1980–2001
- Agent: Falcon Studios

Ronald Pearson (born Ronald L. Pearson: October 10, 1959 – December 10, 2001), known professionally as Ron Pearson, was an American pornographic actor, director, and producer in the gay adult film industry during the 1980s. Known for his athletic build and "all-American" appeal, he was a major star for Falcon Studios before founding his own production house Celsius Productions, a studio active during the peak of the "Golden Age" of gay adult cinema.

== Early life and education ==
Ronald L. Pearson was born in Berkeley, California and raised in Pleasant Hill. He attended Pleasant Hill Elementary and College Park High School. During his teenage years, he lived and studied in Belgium for two years before returning to the East Bay. After high school, he graduated from City College of San Francisco. He moved to San Francisco permanently in 1978.

== Career ==
Pearson's career began in 1980 when he was discovered by legendary director J. Brian at a jock-strap contest at the San Francisco nightclub The EndUp. J. Brian offered him his first role in the film Flashbacks (1980), which became a significant hit.

He subsequently appeared in Falcon Studios' Style (1982). The film's massive success turned many of its performers, including Pearson, into industry stars. Leveraging his success in Style, Pearson began marketing himself by selling professional photo sets. He sought financial backing and co-founded Pegasus Productions with actor Tim Kramer.

He later established Celsius Productions, where he focused on high-quality production values. Notable works under this label include Bad Habits (1983), which featured the Sisters of Perpetual Indulgence, a renowned queer performance and protest group.

Following a difficult working relationship and subsequent breakup with Kramer, Pearson bought out his partner's interest. Lacking an immediate marketing plan for their first film, Pegasus, he sold the distribution rights to William Higgins. He eventually transitioned his efforts into his own studio, Celsius Productions, where he produced and directed his own content. In 1985, he won the XRCO Award for Best Actor for the film Hot on the Trail. Directed by J.D. Cadinot and released through William Higgins, the film was a major commercial success and further cemented Pearson's reputation as a premier talent in the industry.

== Personal life ==
Pearson was known for his fierce independence and a "master plan" for his life. He was a member of the Freewheelers, a gay car club for vintage automobile enthusiasts. An avid traveler, he toured the United States in a custom-tailored RV and visited every continent except Antarctica. He was also a dedicated collector of stamps and coins and spent many summers at the Russian River.

== Death ==
Pearson died at his home in San Francisco on December 10, 2001, at the age of 42 due to complications from AIDS. A memorial service was held at the San Francisco Columbarium, where he is interred. He was survived by four sisters and his two dogs, Shannon and Smoky.

== Filmography ==
=== Film ===
Year	Title	Role	Notes
1980	Flashbacks	Ron	Debut
1981	Style	Ron	
1981	Flashbacks: The Jock Strap Contest Film	Jaden	
1982	Pegasus	Fred	
1983	Bad Habits	Ron	
1984	One, Two, Three...	Matt	
1985	Hot on the Trail	Ron Pearson	
1985	Night Flight	Chris	
1985	Sighs (also known as Lovers & Friends)	Ron	
1987	Alone: And in Heat	Handsome Guy	
1987	Winners	Athletic Boy	
1987	Pegasus 2: Hot To Trot	Fred	
1988	Perfect Summer	Ronald	
2002	Young Men of the 80's 2	Ron	Posthumous release
2005	Pump This	Ron	Posthumous release
2008	The Best of Leo Ford vs. Kurt Marshall	Ron	Posthumous release
2011	Falcon 40th Anniversary Collector's Edition	Ron	Posthumous release
2013	Blue Collar Balling	Ron	Posthumous release
2021	Falcon Icons: The 1980s	Ron	Posthumous release

== Awards and nominations ==
Name of the award ceremony, year presented, category, nominee of the award, and the result of the nomination
Award ceremony	Year	Category	Nominee / Work	Result	Ref.
X-Rated Critics Organization	1985	Best Actor	Hot On The Trail	Won	
