= James Pearson (Northamptonshire cricketer) =

English cricketer

James W. Pearson was an English cricketer who played a single first-class match for Northamptonshire in 1932, scoring one run and taking no wickets for 43. He batted and bowled lefthanded. Details of his full name, birth and death are unknown.
