= Philip Pearson (disambiguation) =

Philip Pearson is a basketball coach.

Philip Pearson may also refer to:

- Philip Pearson (tennis)
- Philip Pearson, character in Travelers (TV series)
