= Michael Pearson =

Michael or Mike Pearson may refer to:

- Lester B. Pearson (1897–1972), known as Mike Pearson, 14th Prime Minister of Canada
- Michael Pearson (horologist) (born 1936), English author on the subject of clocks
- Michael Pearson (historian) (born 1941), historian of Indian Ocean
- Michael Pearson (author) (born 1949), American novelist
- Michael Pearson, 4th Viscount Cowdray (born 1944), landowner and publisher
- Mike Parker Pearson (born 1957), British archaeologist
- J. Michael Pearson (born 1960), CEO of Valeant Pharmaceuticals International
- Mike Pearson (gridiron football) (born 1980), Canadian football player
- Mike Pearson (footballer) (born 1988), Welsh association footballer

== See also ==
- Mike Parson (born 1955), American politician
- Mike Person (born 1988), American football player
