= Bill Pearson (footballer, born 1892) =

Australian rules footballer

Personal information
- Full name: Cecil William Pearson
- Born: 11 November 1892; Corop, Victoria
- Died: 12 May 1959 (aged 66); South Melbourne, Victoria
- Height: 179 cm (5 ft 10 in)
- Weight: 78 kg (172 lb)

Playing career^{1}
Years	Club	Games (Goals)
1919–20	South Melbourne	12 (9)
- ^{1} Playing statistics correct to the end of 1920.

Cecil William Pearson (11 November 1892 – 12 May 1959) was an Australian rules footballer who played with South Melbourne in the Victorian Football League (VFL).
