= Kevin Pearson =

Kevin Pearson may refer to:

- Kevin Pearson (politician) (born 1959), Republican member of the Louisiana House of Representatives
- Kevin Pearson (bishop), Scottish bishop
- Kevin Pearson, fictional character on NBC's This Is Us TV series
- K. F. Pearson (Kevin Francis Pearson), Australian poet, secretary of the South Australian Poets' Union in the 1970s–1980s
