= Stoystown, Pennsylvania =

Borough in Pennsylvania, US

- Borough
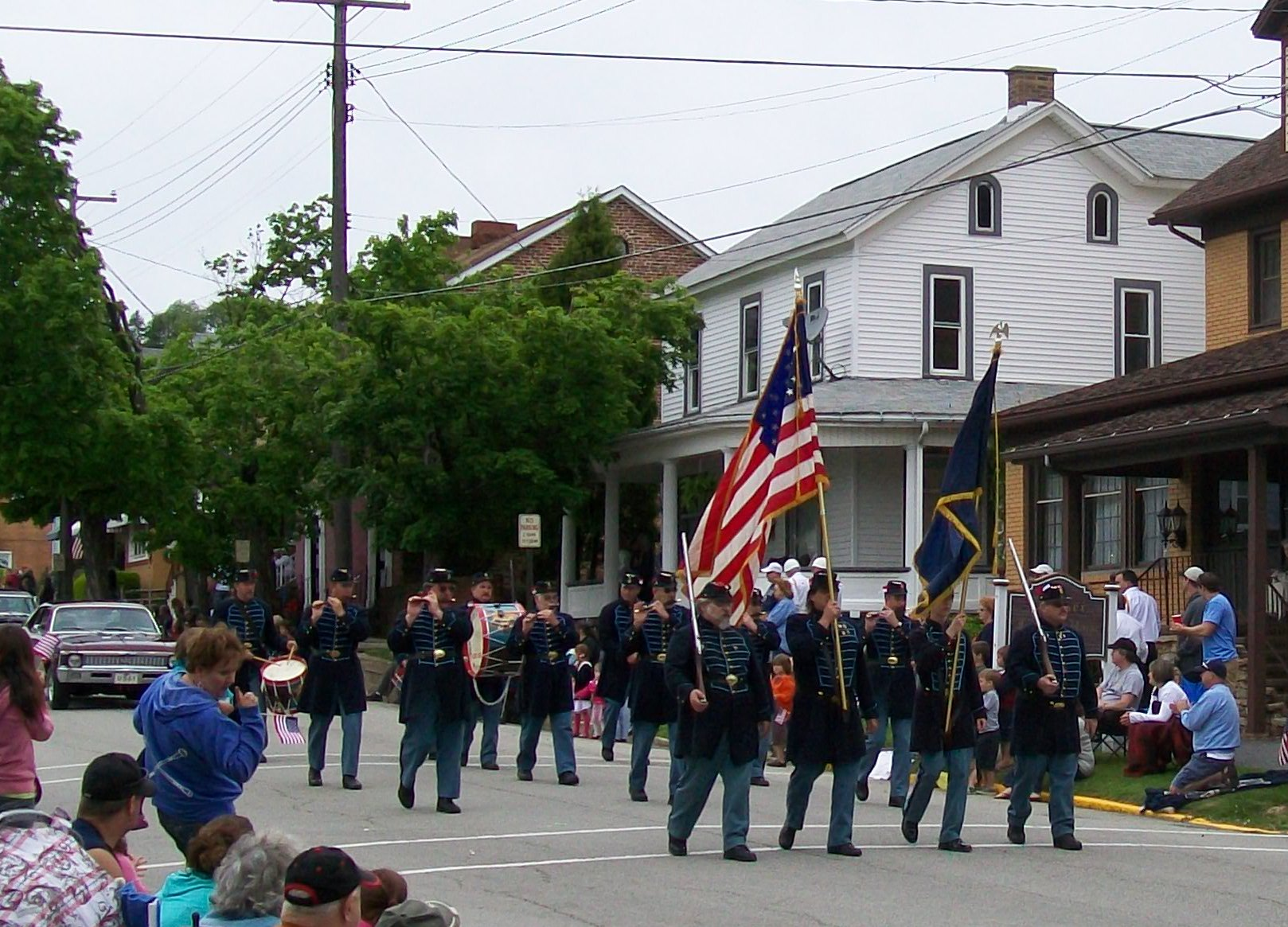
- Memorial Day parade

- Location of Stoystown in Somerset County, Pennsylvania.

- Location within Pennsylvania
- Coordinates: 40°06′10″N 78°57′14″W
- Country: United States
- State: Pennsylvania
- County: Somerset
- Settled: 1774
- Incorporated: March 29, 1819

Government
  - Type: Borough Council

Area
  - Total: 0.19 sq mi (0.49 km^{2})
  - Land: 0.19 sq mi (0.49 km^{2})
  - Water: 0 sq mi (0.00 km^{2})

Population (2020)
  - Total: 300
  - Density: 1,577.5/sq mi (609.08/km^{2})
- Time zone: UTC-5 (Eastern (EST))
  - Summer (DST): UTC-4 (EDT)
- Zip code: 15563
- Area code: 814
- FIPS code: 42-74672

Stoystown is a borough in Somerset County, Pennsylvania, United States. It is part of the Johnstown, Pennsylvania, Metropolitan Statistical Area. The population was 300 at the 2020 census. Stoystown is located south-southeast of Johnstown and northeast of Somerset.

== History ==
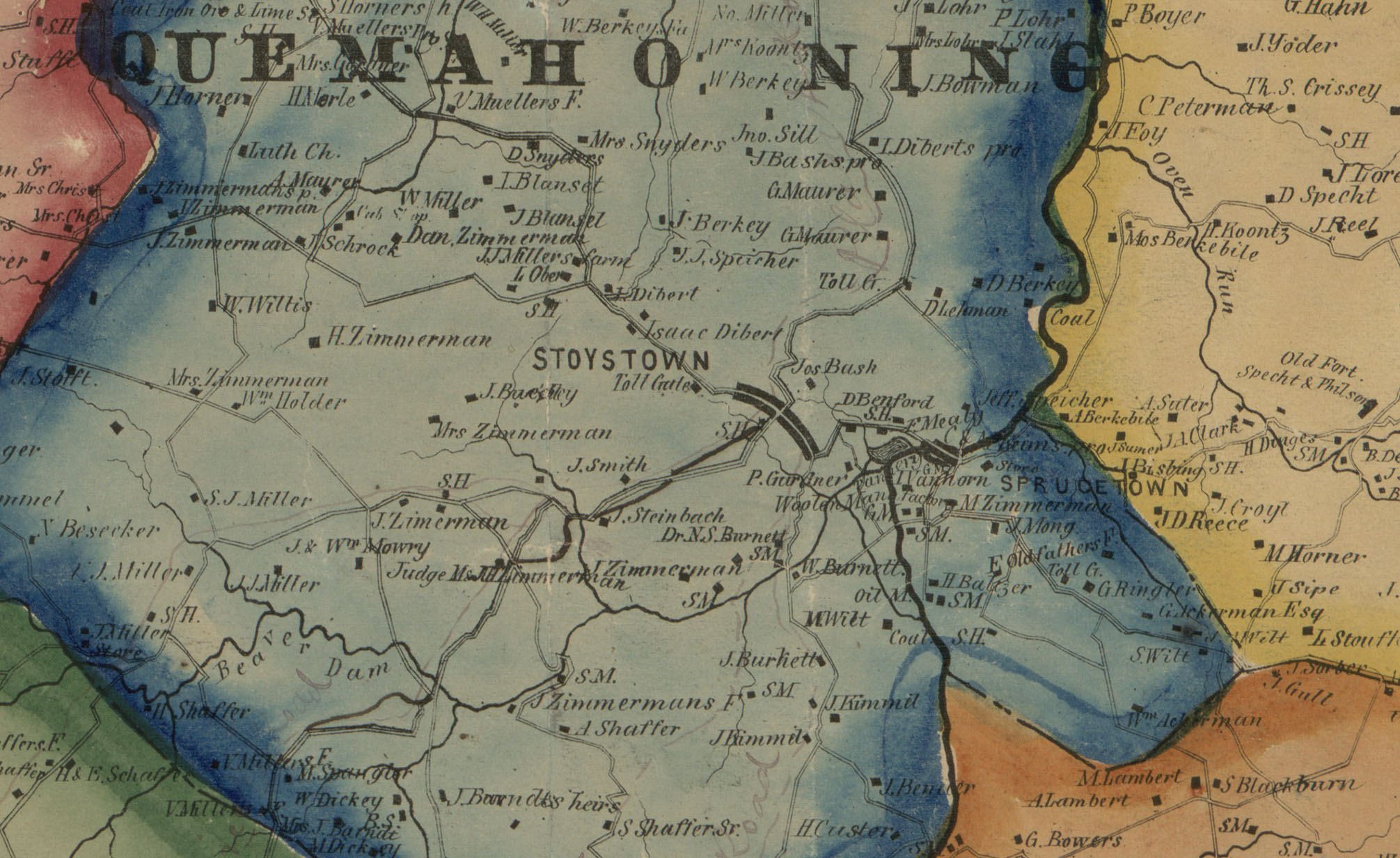
Stoystown, Somerset County, Pennsylvania, 1860

The site of the Stony Creek Encampment is near the eastern end of Stoystown, slightly north of U.S. Route 30. This small supply depot was located along Forbes Road during the French & Indian War.

Daniel Stoy was one of the first settlers west of the mountains. From the records of Harmon Husband, we find that Stoy lived along the Forbes Road about 1762 near the Casper Stotler place in Shade Township, that he made his living by hunting, and that he was driven from his cabin home several times by the Indians, taking refuge at Fort Bedford. The records of Husband state that on one occasion Stoy shot an Indian intruder from his cabin door. With the construction of the Pennsylvania Road, Stoy decided to move to a place about ten miles farther west along the road where he received a warrant for more than three hundred acres of land. Here on this tract of land along the Pennsylvania Road, he founded the town of Stoystown in 1774. Stoy served as a volunteer in the Revolutionary War with the rank of corporal. It is thought that he also served in the French and Indian War, although the records are rather vague. Henry was born in 1747. Married Sally Stoy, daughter of Daniel M. Stoy, who sold lots and laid out the town of Stoystown about 1800, one of the oldest towns in Somerset Co., Pennsylvania. Daniel M. Stoy served as captain in Gen. George Washington's army for 12 months. He was discharged at Long Island, New York, July 1778. Later he moved to what is now Somerset Co., Pennsylvania. He was a justice of the peace. He served in the General Assembly in 1809–10 and 1813. He died 1834. D.A.R. marker on grave. Daniel Stoy, born in England, May 3, 1738, died January 11, 1835, in Stoystown, Somerset Co., Pennsylvania. He was married about 1759 to Sarah Higgins of Scotland (April 4, 1737 – October 31, 1818. Soon after their marriage they came to America and located at Conchohockin, Pennsylvania, where their six children were born, viz., (1) Sarah (Sally), the oldest daughter, married Henry Beaver; (2)Daniel married a Miss Shedrick; (3)Ned never married; (4) John married Elizabeth Pisel; (5) William; (6) Margaret, the youngest child (Conchohockin, October 15, 1780 – December 6, 1868). She was 7 years old when her parents moved to what was then Bedford Co., now Somerset Co., Pennsylvania. She married Abraham Spangler and they had 14 children. Henry Beaver moved his family from Stoystown, Pennsylvania, to Greensburg, Westmoreland Co., Pennsylvania. They had one son that we know of, John F. Beaver, who read law at Greensburg, Pennsylvania. The Stoystown Historic District and Hite House are listed on the National Register of Historic Places.

=== September 11 attacks ===
On September 11, 2001, United Airlines Flight 93 crashed in nearby Stonycreek Township. The Flight 93 National Memorial is located in Stoystown.

== Geography ==
Stoystown is located at 40°6′10″N 78°57′14″W (40.102753, -78.953869). The borough is surrounded by Quemahoning Township.

According to the United States Census Bureau, the borough has a total area of 0.2 square miles (0.52 km^{2}), all land.

== Demographics ==
Historical population
Census	Pop.	Note	%±
1820	204		—
1840	357		—
1850	321		−10.1%
1860	316		−1.6%
1870	288		−8.9%
1880	319		10.8%
1890	291		−8.8%
1900	306		5.2%
1910	355		16.0%
1920	342		−3.7%
1930	447		30.7%
1940	461		3.1%
1950	517		12.1%
1960	360		−30.4%
1970	446		23.9%
1980	432		−3.1%
1990	389		−10.0%
2000	428		10.0%
2010	355		−17.1%
2020	300		−15.5%
2021 (est.)	298	▼	−0.7%
U.S. Decennial Census

As of the census of 2000, there were 428 people, 184 households, and 117 families residing in the borough. The population density was 2,267.5 inhabitants per square mile (875.5/km^{2}). There were 201 housing units at an average density of 1,064.9 per square mile (411.2/km^{2}). The racial makeup of the borough was 99.77% White and 0.23% Native American. Hispanic or Latino of any race were 0.23% of the population.

There were 184 households, out of which 26.1% had children under the age of 18 living with them, 53.3% were married couples living together, 7.6% had a female householder with no husband present, and 36.4% were non-families. 33.7% of all households were made up of individuals, and 21.7% had someone living alone who was 65 years of age or older. The average household size was 2.33 and the average family size was 2.99.

In the borough the population was spread out, with 22.0% under the age of 18, 6.5% from 18 to 24, 24.5% from 25 to 44, 21.7% from 45 to 64, and 25.2% who were 65 years of age or older. The median age was 43 years. For every 100 females there were 82.9 males. For every 100 females age 18 and over, there were 85.6 males.

The median income for a household in the borough was $30,313, and the median income for a family was $36,250. Males had a median income of $27,361 versus $21,667 for females. The per capita income for the borough was $14,629. About 11.7% of families and 17.3% of the population were below the poverty line, including 20.8% of those under age 18 and 16.5% of those age 65 or over.

== Transportation ==
Stoystown is accessed and bypassed by U.S. 30 (Lincoln Highway), and Route 281.
