= Bill Pearson (rugby league) =

Australian rugby league footballer and coach

Personal information
- Full name: William Pearson
- Died: 12 May 2022

Playing information
- Position: Five-eighth, Centre, Forward
Club
Years	Team	Pld	T	G	FG	P
1955–57	West End (Ipswich)
195?–6?	Norths (Brisbane)
1964–??	Brothers (Bundaberg)
	Total	0	0	0	0	0
Representative
Years	Team	Pld	T	G	FG	P
1957–58	Queensland	6	1	0	0	3
195?–5?	Brisbane
19??–??	Bundaberg
19??–??	Wide Bay

Bill Pearson was an Australian former professional rugby league footballer who played in the 1950s and 1960s. A Queensland interstate representative centre, he played club football in Ipswich, Brisbane and Bundaberg, usually at five-eighth.

In 1955 Pearson started playing for the Ipswich Rugby League's West End club. In 1957 he became a regular centre for the Queensland rugby league team's annual matches against New South Wales.

Pearson moved to Brisbane, playing with the Northern Suburbs club. He played for the Maroons against Great Britain in 1958. Pearson also played for Brisbane in the Bulimba Cup. In the 1961 Brisbane Rugby League season premiership's grand final Pearson captained Norths at five-eighth and was instrumental in his team's victory over Fortitude Valley.

In 1964 Pearson moved to Bundaberg where he started playing for the Brothers club in the forwards and became captain coach. In 1965 Brothers reached the grand final in which Pearson was sent off, his team losing to Wanderers. However, in the grand final the following year Brothers defeated Natives. In 1966 he also captained Wide Bay's state championship winning team. In 1967 the Pearson-led Brothers side won the premiership again. That year he also captained the Bundaberg team against the Australian national team at Salter Oval in Bundaberg, the home team putting up a fine performance going down 31-12.
