= Mary Pearson =

Mary Pearson may refer to:

- Mary E. Pearson (born 1955), American children's writer
- Mary Martha Pearson (1798–1871), English portrait painter
