= Anthony Pearson (Quaker) =

Anthony Pearson (1628–1670?), was an English Quaker. In 1648, he became secretary to Sir Arthur Hesilrige. He acted as clerk and registrar of the committee for compounding from its appointment in 1649 and became a Quaker in 1653. He wrote in reprobation of the persecution of the Friends and enlarged on the same theme in a personal interview with Oliver Cromwell. In 1654 he published his well-known work, The Great Case of Tythes truly stated (latest edition, 1850), in which he argues against involuntary tithes. His loyalty was suspected after the Restoration. He renounced his faith in his endeavour to stand well with government. In 1665, he was the under-sheriff for Durham.
