= Bryan Pearson (businessman) =

Canadian business executive and author

Bryan Pearson (born 1963) is a Canadian business executive, bestselling author, and keynote speaker. Pearson serves as the President and C.E.O. of Alliance Data's LoyaltyOne, a global provider of loyalty marketing services, programs and analytics.

His published books are "The Loyalty Leap: Turning Customer Information Into Customer Intimacy" and "The Loyalty Leap for B2B."

== Biography ==
In 1982 Pearson enrolled in Queen's University with the intention of becoming a doctor like both of his parents. To earn money on the side, he ran his own small business providing services such as painting houses. He subsequently developed an interest in entrepreneurship which prompted Pearson to change his major. He graduated from Queen's in 1986 with a BScH in life sciences – later returning to earn his MBA in marketing.

Pearson currently resides in Toronto and is married to his wife of 39 years, Sally, with three children: Jeremy, Robyn and Hayley.

== Career ==
Pearson began his career as a product manager for Quaker Oats in 1988. He then served as a channel marketing manager at Alias before joining current company LoyaltyOne in 1992.

Pearson started his 30-year tenure with the company as a director of sponsor marketing at AIR MILES, Canada's largest coalition loyalty program. He then worked as vice president of sponsor management for the program before eventually becoming AIR MILES president. In this role, Pearson oversaw the development and execution of loyalty and database marketing strategies that build long-term, interactive and value-added relationships with AIR MILES customers.

Today, Pearson is retired. He previously served as the CEO and president of LoyaltyOne and also functioned as the president of Alliance Data Loyalty Services. He is a highly regarded expert on enterprise loyalty, retail marketing, coalition marketing and customer relationship management and has been quoted in more than 150 news outlets including The Wall Street Journal, Forbes, BusinessWeek, the Los Angeles Times, MSNBC and the Atlanta Journal-Constitution. Pearson is also a regular contributor to COLLOQUY, a loyalty marketing publication owned by LoyaltyOne, at which he also serves on the editorial board. He is also a regular columnist for Fast Company.

== Books ==
Pearson is the author of the bestselling book The Loyalty Leap: Turning Customer Information into Customer Intimacy as well as The Loyalty Leap for B2B.

The Loyalty Leap landed on best-seller lists in the first week of its release. It ranked at No. 5, No. 3 and No. 10 on the New York Times, USA Today and Wall Street Journal non-fiction best-seller lists, respectively. The book reveals common myths behind the privacy debate and challenges critics who equate data-usage marketing with for-profit spying. It also touches upon the concept of enterprise loyalty and the role front-line employees play in creating relevant offers for customers. Finally, the book shares five principles for using customer data responsibly while being sensitive to privacy concerns - ultimately enabling companies to make the loyalty leap.

The Loyalty Leap for B2B was written as a followup to The Loyalty Leap and was published exclusively as an e-book. Pearson's second book provides the steps to making the loyalty leap in a B2B relationship across three different segments: small businesses, large enterprises and channel marketers. It offers a blueprint for using customer information to support a business's specific goals and features case studies from American Express, Teradata, Premier Healthcare Exchange and Salesforce.com. In addition, the e-book details six steps to creating a loyalty initiative that will enhance business relationships and improve revenue and productivity.
