= Charles Pearson (disambiguation) =

Charles Pearson (1793–1862) was Solicitor to the City of London and promoter of London's first underground railway.

Charles Pearson may also refer to:

- The Hon Charles Anthony Pearson (born 1956), Scottish landowner and owner of Dunecht Estates
- Charles Henry Pearson (1830–1894), historian and Australian politician
- Charles Pearson, Lord Pearson (1843–1910), Scottish politician and judge
- Charles Pearson (British Army officer) (1834–1909), British colonel in the Zulu war
- Charlie Pearson, Australian rules footballer
- Charles L. Pearson (1860–1918), Wisconsin state senator
- Charles Pearson (priest) (1847–1917), pioneer Anglican missionary in Uganda
