= Richard Pearson =

Richard Pearson may refer to:

- Richard Pearson (Royal Navy officer) (1731–1806), British sea captain
- Richard Pearson (physician) (1765–1836), English medical writer
- Richard Pearson (police officer) (1831–1890), Assistant Commissioner (Executive) of the London Metropolitan Police, 1881–1890
- Richard Pearson (actor) (1918–2011), British film, television and stage actor
- Richard J. Pearson (born 1938), Canadian expert in East Asian archaeology
- Richard Pearson (film editor) (born 1961), film editor
- Richard Pearson (cricketer) (born 1972), English cricketer

== See also ==
- Richard Pearson Strong (1872–1948), tropical medicine professor at Harvard
