= James Pearson (painter) =

British painter

James Pearson (died 1838) was an Irish-born glass painter, active in London.

== Life ==
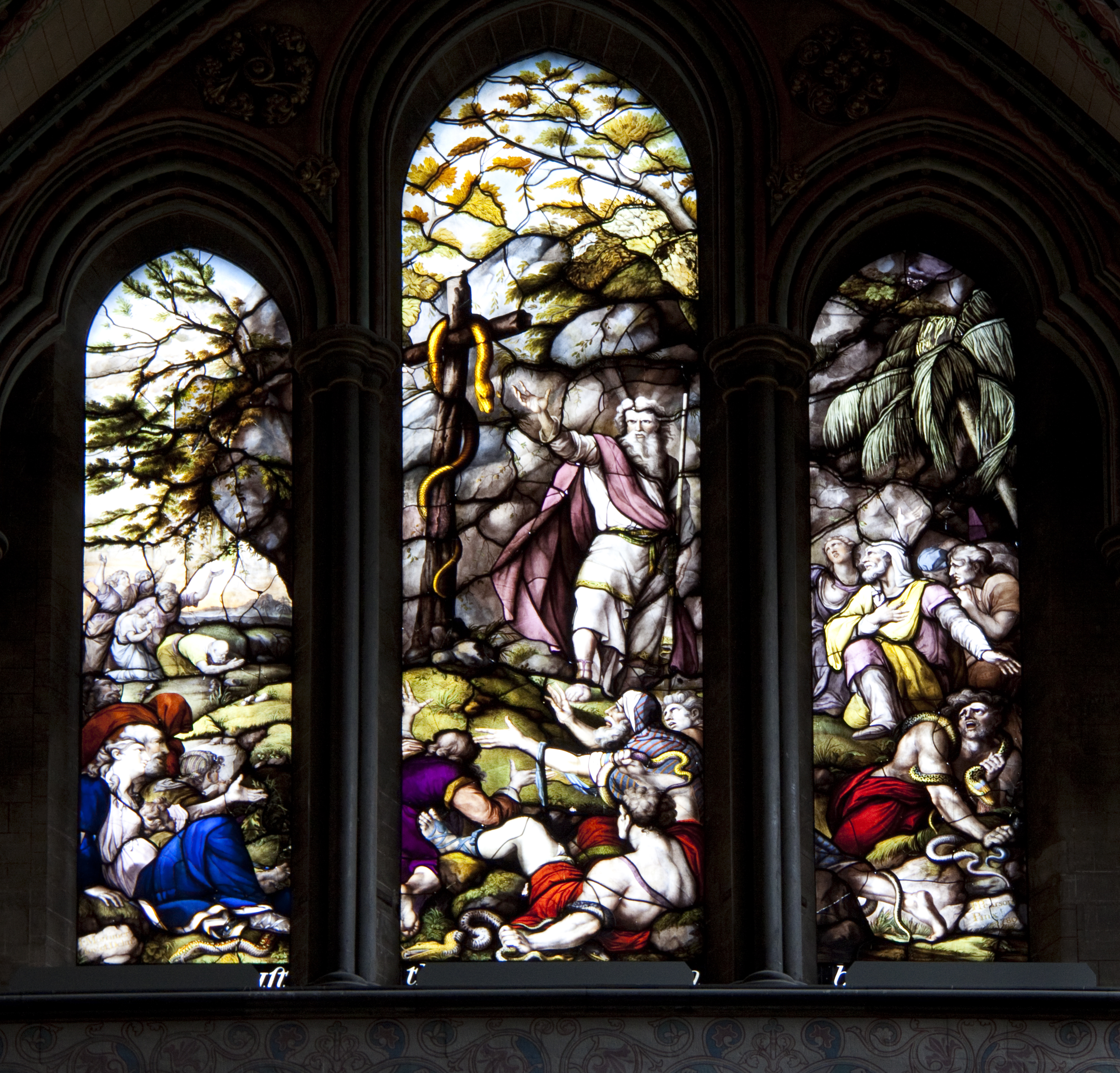
Pearson's Brazen Serpent in the Wilderness, after a design by John Hamilton Mortimer, in the east window of Salisbury Cathedral.

Pearson was born in Dublin about the middle of the 18th century. He learnt his art in Bristol. In 1768 he married Eglington Margaret Paterson, also a glass painter. She was the daughter of Samuel Paterson, a well-known book-auctioneer.

Pearson and his wife came to public attention through works shown at the Society of Artists of Great Britain in its exhibitions in 1775–77. Although the couple usually worked on separate pieces they occasionally collaborated, as on their stained glass copy after Carlo Maratti's Salutation, shown in 1775. A later joint work was one after Guido Reni's Aurora, shown in London in 1793. The Pearsons used a technique in which the image was painted in enamels on sheets of plain glass and then fired.

The Pearsons exhibited regularly throughout the 1780s and 1790s at their homes in London, first in Church Street, Westminster, and later in Great Newport Street, and also at the new Pantheon in Oxford Street. It was there, in 1781, that Pearson showed his spectacular Brazen Serpent in the Wilderness, after a design by John Hamilton Mortimer, before its installation in the east window of Salisbury Cathedral, where it still remains. A critic in the Morning Chronicle admired the way in which "the lead and iron are intirely concealed, so as not to interrupt the outline either of the figures or drapery, by which the whole appears as one entire plate of glass, without joining or division".

His patrons included Horace Walpole, for whom he executed a window of a cobbler whistling to a bird in a cage for the refectory at Strawberry Hill, and William Beckford, for whom he made a portrait of Thomas Becket for Fonthill.

The catalogue of an exhibition held by the Pearsons in 1821 was entitled Celebrated Cartoons of Raphael, and Various Other Beautiful Specimens, by Mr. and Mrs. Pearson, Appointed Painters to Her Majesty, on Glass, in Vitrified Colours, at No. 112, Great Russell-Street, Bloomsbury. The paintings after Raphael were by his wife.

He also made windows for Brasenose College, Oxford and the church of St Botolph, Aldersgate in London. He painted some designs after James Barry.

He exhibited as late as 1821, and died in 1838, his wife having died in 1823.

== Sources ==
Attribution:
