= Robert W. Bly =

American writer (born 1957)

Robert W. Bly (born July 21, 1957) is an American writer on the subjects of copywriting, freelance writing, and many other subjects from science and science fiction, to satire and small business. He is a copywriter.

Bly grew up in Fair Lawn, New Jersey. He got a degree in chemical engineering in 1979 at the University of Rochester, beginning his writing career with four intense years at the school's daily newspaper. When he graduated, he began as a corporate writer for Westinghouse Electric and then worked for a New York engineering firm for a few years. He published his first book in 1982, on technical writing. In 1985, at the age of 27, he published his tenth book, The Copywriter's Handbook.

Bly has worked as a freelance copywriter for the AARP, IBM, and Lucent Technologies, among others.

Bly has written more than 100 books including The Digital Marketing Handbook from Entrepreneur Press.

Bly also has an internet information marketing industry.

He lives in Montville, New Jersey
