= List of Connecticut suffragists =

This is a list of Connecticut suffragists, suffrage groups and others associated with the cause of women's suffrage in Connecticut.

== Groups ==
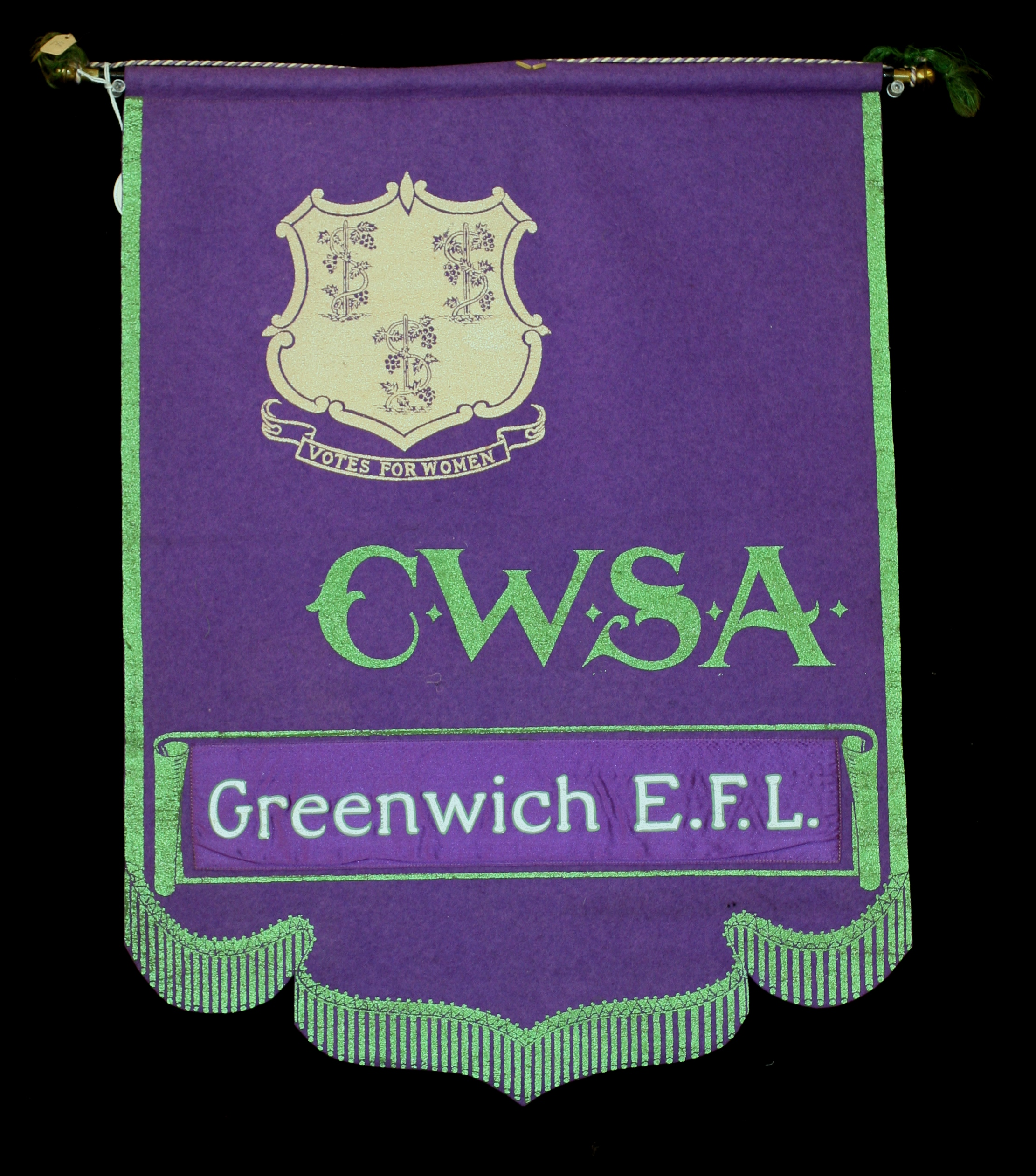
- Connecticut Woman Suffrage Association, Greenwich Equal Franchise League banner
  Congressional Union for Woman Suffrage (Woman's Political union) of Connecticut.
- Connecticut Woman Suffrage Association (CWSA), established in 1869.
- Equal Rights Club of Willimantic, founded in 1894.
- Greenwich Equal Suffrage League.
- Farmington Equal Franchise League.
- Hartford Equal Franchise League, established first as the Hartford Political Equality League in 1909.
- Hartford Equal Rights League, founded in 1885.
- Litchfield Equal Franchise League.
- Men's League for Woman Suffrage.
- Meriden Political Equality Club, founded in 1889.
- National Junior Suffrage Corps.
- New Haven Equal Franchise League, founded in 1912.
- New Haven Political Equality Club.
- National Woman's Party (NWP).
- Norwalk Equal Franchise League (NEFL).
- Norwich Equal Franchise League.
- Old Lyme Equal Franchise League.
- South Manchester Equal Franchise League.
- Suffrage Emergency Corps, created in 1920.
- Wallingford Equal Franchise League.
- Waterbury Equal Franchise League.
- Westport Equal Franchise League.
- Windsor Equal Franchise League.

== Suffragists ==
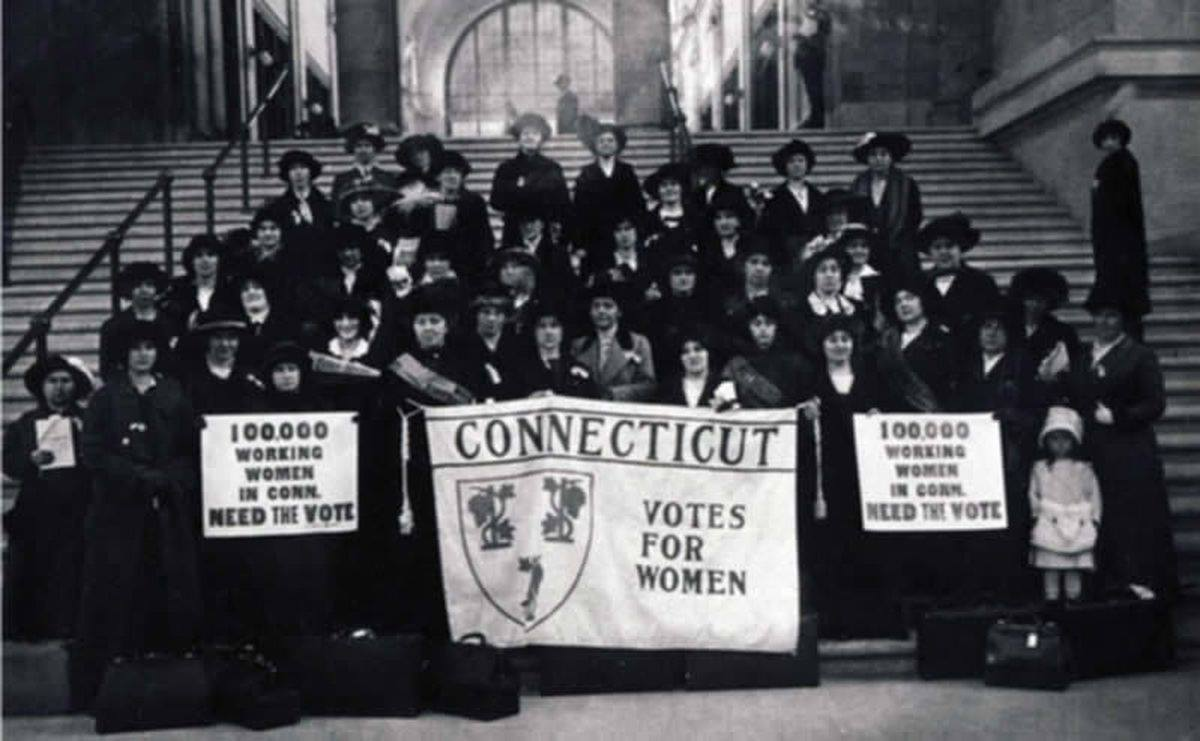
- Connecticut Votes for Women, Working women need the vote c 1919
  Lillian Ascough.
- Annie Brewer Austin (Middletown).
- Elizabeth D. Bacon.
- Dorothy Jones Bartlett.
- Catharine Beecher.
- Henry Ward Beecher.
- Josephine Bennett (Hartford).
- Minnie L. Bradley (New Haven).
- Rhoda L. Brooks (Hartford).
- Olympia Brown (Bridgeport).
- Clara Burr (Norwich).
- Frances Ellen Burr (Hartford).
- Nathaniel J. Burton.
- Helen Chisaski (Bridgeport).
- Callie Mathes Coleman (Hartford).
- Emily Parmely Collins (Hartford).
- Sara Crawford (Westport).
- Amelia Shaw MacDonald Cutler (Westport).
- Daisy Trotter Daniels (Hartford).
- Katherine Beach Day (Hartford).
- Rosa J. Richardson Fisher (Hartford).
- Catherine Flanagan (Hartford).
- Sarah Lee Brown Fleming (New Haven).
- Martha Minerva Franklin (New Haven).
- Laura Gardin Fraser (Westport).
- Minnie L. Glover (Hartford).
- Elizabeth Jeter Greene (New London).
- Alyse Gregory (Norwalk).
- Phoebe Hanaford (New Haven).
- Minnie Hennessy.
- Katharine Martha Houghton Hepburn (West Hartford).
- George A. Hickox (Litchfield).
- Clara Hill (Norwalk).
- Elsie Hill.
- Maud W. Hincks (Bridgeport).
- Isabella Beecher Hooker.
- John Hooker.
- Anna Louise James (Old Saybrook).
- Mary A. Johnson (Hartford).
- Ella B. Kendrick.
- Lena E. Knighton (Hartford).
- Ruby E. Koenig.
- Ida Napier Lawson (Hartford).
- Pearl Woods Lee.
- Katharine Ludington (Old Lyme).
- Martha Rufner Maddox (Hartford).
- Elmer Livingston MacRae (Greenwich).
- Anna Holden Mazzanovich (Westport).
- Ethel L. Murray (West Hartford).
- Valeria Hopkins Parker (Greenwich).
- Alice Paul (Ridgefield).
- Rose Payton (Hartford).
- Emily Pierson (Cromwell).
- Annie Porritt (Hartford).
- Edna M. Purtell.
- Anna B. Reese (Hartford).
- Emma Winner Rogers.
- Mary Jane Rogers (Montville).
- Caroline Ruutz-Rees (Greenwich).
- Linna Saunders (New Haven).
- Beatrice Johnson Saxon (New Haven).
- Ruth Scott.
- Alfredo Samuel Guido Taylor (Norfolk).
- Grace Gallatin Seton Thompson (Greenwich).
- Mary Townsend Seymour (Hartford).
- Abby Hadassah Smith (Glastonbury).
- Julia Evelina Smith (Glastonbury).
- The Smiths of Glastonbury.
- Harriet Beecher Stowe (Hartford).
- Rebecca Tanner (Stamford).
- Augusta Lewis Troup (New Haven).
- Ida Sully Troy (Hartford).
- Elsie Ver Vane.
- Helena Hill Weed (Norwalk).

Politicians supporting women's suffrage

- John H. Light.
- Clifford B. Wilson (Bridgeport).

== Suffragists campaigning in Connecticut ==
Groups

- Suffrage Emergency Corps

People

- Jane Addams.
- Susan B. Anthony.
- Ethel Arnold.
- Charles A. Beard.
- Ella Reeve Bloor.
- Margaret Bondfield.
- Carrie Chapman Catt.
- Stanton Coit.
- Rheta Childe Dorr.
- Arthur Radclyffe Dugmore.
- Max Eastman.
- William Lloyd Garrison.
- Beatrice Forbes-Robertson Hale.
- Grace Raymond Hebard.
- Arthur N. Holcombe.
- Mary Seymour Howell.
- Lucy Huffaker.
- Fola La Follette.
- Mary Livermore.
- Owen Lovejoy.
- Dudley Field Malone.
- Emmeline Pankhurst.
- Byron Phelps.
- Jeannette Rankin.
- Nancy Schoonmaker.
- Ernest Thompson Seton.
- Anna Howard Shaw.
- Elizabeth Cady Stanton.
- Lincoln Steffens.
- Ruza Wenclawska.
- Elizabeth Upham Yates.
- Charles Zueblin.

== Anti-suffragists ==
Groups

- Connecticut Association Opposed to Woman Suffrage (CAOWS), formed in 1910.

People

- Grace G. Markham, president of CAOWS.

== See also ==
- List of suffragists and suffragettes
- Timeline of women's suffrage in Connecticut
- Women's suffrage in Connecticut
- Women's suffrage in the United States
- Timeline of women's suffrage in the United States
