= Women's suffrage in Connecticut =

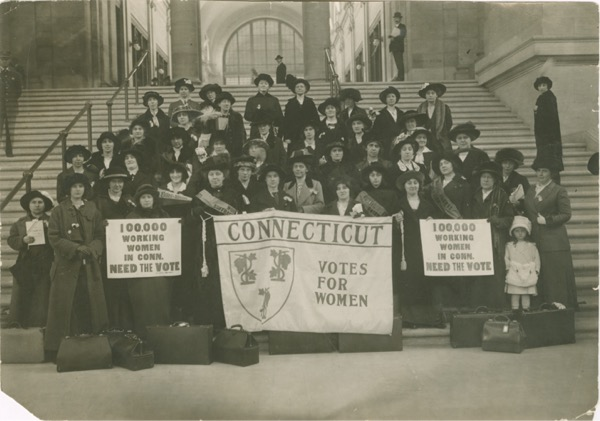
Connecticut Working Woman Delegation to see President Wilson, 1919.

Women's suffrage efforts in Connecticut began in the 1860s. Frances Ellen Burr was a very important early suffragist who worked with John Hooker and Isabella Beecher Hooker to create the Connecticut Woman Suffrage Association (CWSA). Early efforts included creating political equality clubs and hosting conventions throughout the state. In the mid 1890s, women in the state earned the right to vote for school officials.

In the early 1900s, Emily Pierson created several publicity stunts for suffragists in the state. These included trolley and automobile tours and lectures. British suffragette, Emmeline Pankhurst, spoke in the state. Further demonstrations, parades and more continued until Connecticut ratified the Nineteenth Amendment on September 14, 1920.

== Early efforts ==
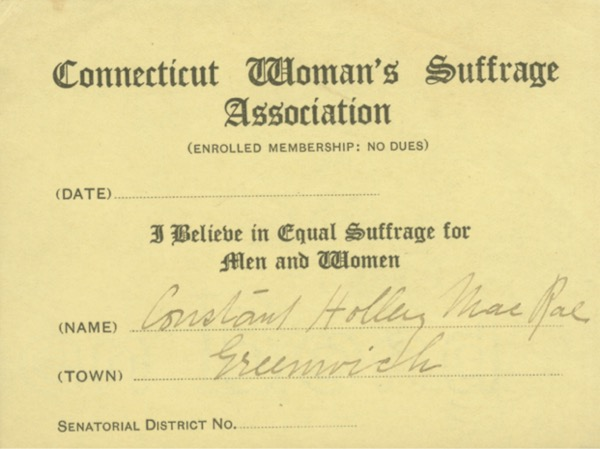
Connecticut Woman’s Suffrage Association Membership Card belonging to Constant Holley MacRae.

Frances Ellen Burr was one of the earliest activists to begin suffrage work in Connecticut. Burr collected enough petitions in 1867 to introduce a woman's suffrage bill in the Connecticut General Assembly. The bill was defeated, but by a fairly narrow margin, and it gave Burr hope for the future. In the fall of 1869, Burr, Isabella Beecher Hooker, John Hooker, and others, put out the call for a state women's suffrage convention. The resulting convention was held in late October in Hartford, Connecticut. Suffragists from New England and representatives from the National Woman Suffrage Association (NWSA) attended. Susan B. Anthony and Elizabeth Cady Stanton were among the attendees. The Connecticut Woman Suffrage Association (CWSA) was founded after this convention. Nathaniel J. Burton served as the first president of CWSA and then, in 1871, Isabella Hooker took over as the president for the next thirty years. The Hookers remained very involved with suffrage and CWSA. John Hooker gave speeches and wrote letters to the editor of the Hartford Courant in favor of women's right to vote. John also wrote the bylaws for CWSA. Isabella Hooker remained the CWSA president until 1906, when vice-president, Elizabeth Bacon, took over.

"Taxation without representation" was a major argument for a women's right to vote in Connecticut. Julia and Abby Smith, also known as the "Maids of Glastonbury," refused to pay their taxes in the 1870s because they were not allowed by law to vote. This led to their property being seized by the town and sold for collection of their tax revenue. The two sisters were considered "sympathetic characters" and their stand for their right to vote had an effect on popular culture. They were often featured in the news and were compared to Revolutionary War heroes or martyrs.

State suffrage conventions continued in the 1880s and the creation of several local suffrage groups also took place. Burr and Emily Parmely Collins started the Hartford Equal Rights Club in 1885. In 1889, the Meriden Political Equality Club was formed, with Isaac C. Lewis as a charter member.

In 1893, women in Connecticut were finally able to vote for school officials. Women in many parts of the state exercised their right to vote in these elections. In Willimantic, in 1895, members of the equal rights club unseated a member of the board and went on to consolidate the school districts. The women in that city accomplished their goals by increasing the women's voter turnout by 500 percent. In 1897 the state legislature amended the school voting law to make voter registration more complication, presumably in order to discourage women voters.

In 1902, the state held a Constitutional convention to update the Constitution of Connecticut. Resolutions for equal suffrage were presented by to the constitutional convention by Daniel Davenport and Norris Osborn, though they "were defeated without debate."

Even though women had earned the right to vote in limited elections, they felt that they were not making real political progress. This led to a decline in participation in the CWSA, which had only 50 members by 1906.

== Continued efforts ==
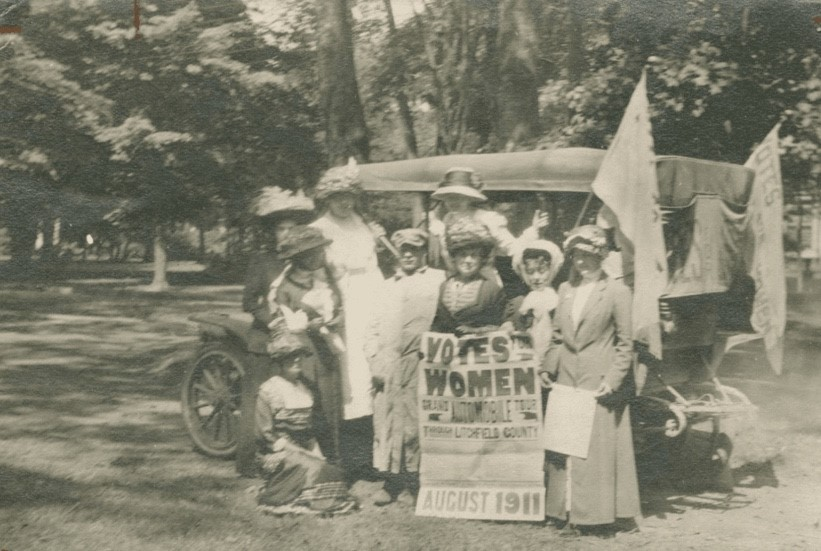
Decorated car with Connecticut suffragists in Litchfied County, August 1911

Emmeline Pankhurst, a famous suffragette from England, visited Hartford in October of 1909. Pankhurst's visit sparked off a new campaign that led to the creation of the Hartford Political Equality League, which later became the Equal Franchise League of Hartford. This group started working with a young group of suffragists from Greenwich who had formed their own Equal Franchise League. Caroline Ruutz-Rees was active in the Greenwich group.

Emily Pierson started creating "cutting-edge campaign strategies" for the CWSA starting in 1910. The trolley and automobile campaigns that Pierson championed helped to dispel common stereotypes of suffragists as "unladylike spinsters" because it gave residents of the visited towns and cities a chance to meet the activists face-to-face. Pierson created an automobile campaign in the summer of 1911. Many suffragists toured Litchfield County, Connecticut and spoke to residents about suffrage topics. Important speakers included Charles A. Beard and Arthur N. Holcombe. Suffragists and their guest speakers toured thirty three towns in all. In the news, it was advertised that "college girls" would take part in the auto tour and that cars would be decorated with suffrage colors and banners. After the first week of the auto tour, suffragists claimed that hundreds of people joined the cause. One meeting in Canaan gave them ninety new members. In late 1911, Pierson planned a winter trolley campaign for the winter of 1912. The campaign took place in Fairfield, Hartford and New Haven counties between January 24 and March 28.

As Pierson did more organizing, she created five local branches of the CWSA, called the Equality League of Self-Supporting Women, which were centered in major cities in the state. Pierson campaigned in French, German, and Italian while giving speeches. She also reached out to Jewish women, speaking at the Hartford Council of Jewish Women in January of 1915. Pierson advocated for women to govern themselves, pointing out that women best understood the issues that affected them.

In 1912, Pierson brought back her tactic, called "Voiceless Speech." This method involved having a suffragist sit in a shop window and display different cards advertising women's suffrage. The CWSA opened new headquarters in Hartford in 1913. In 1913, Pankhurst gave a speech for CWSA titled "Freedom or Death." That same year, The Connecticut Players opened the British play, How the Vote Was Won, in Norwalk on August 8, 1913. Pierson and Alyse Gregory toured the state in several additional suffrage car tours in 1913 and 1914.

Connecticut activists celebrated National Suffrage Day on May 2, 1914 with demonstrations, parades, and speeches. In Hartford, there were more than 1,000 participants for their successful and large suffrage parade. Around 2,000 suffragists of all ages took part in the event. The parade was photographed and the pictures were sold as souvenirs and also to create a newsreel shown at theaters. Overall, the Hartford parade generated excitement for the suffrage movement in Connecticut and was recognized as a "spectacular" event by the Hartford Courant.

In February of 1917, the Connecticut House judiciary committee heard from both suffragists and anti-suffragists on the issue of allowing Connecticut women to vote. Members of CWSA, represented by Hepburn and Pierson testified for women's suffrage. By this time CWSA had grown to include 32,000 members.

Also in 1917, the NWP was involved in picketing the White House and many women in Connecticut participated in these peaceful protests. CWSA,, a NAWSA affiliate, came out publicly against these demonstrations. Many women, including Hepburn and Catherine Flanagan, quit CWSA because of their stance and joined the Connecticut branch of the NWP.

Katharine Ludington took over as president of CWSA after Hepburn left. Under Ludington, suffragists in CWSA began to aid in the war effort and "resource conservation."Many helped with the Red Cross, sold Liberty bonds, and as nurses. These actions were meant to show how women could help as citizens and put their patriotic work in the public eye. Not only did the CWSA members volunteer for the war effort, they also promoted an equal pay campaign for women working towards the defense effort. CWSA also began promoting citizenship education and political literacy for women around the state. Suffrage organizer, Nancy Schoonmaker, lead the Citizenship Committee of the CWSA. Schoonmaker argued that as future voters, it was important for women to understand the political process. The classes were successful and grew in size, training women to bring back their skills to their own communities. Schoonmaker's curriculum and writing were used by other organizations to teach Americans about politics and government.

In March of 1919, during the hearing on the Presidential Suffrage Bill, suffragists marched from the CWSA headquarters to the Connecticut Capitol where they presented a petition with 98,000 signatures to the state legislators.

Connecticut was a battleground state for ratifying the 19th Amendment and activists in the state were eager to win. An "emergency week," May 3-7, 1920, was declared and 46 prominent suffragists formed the Suffrage Emergency Corps. Connecticut finally ratified the Nineteenth Amendment on September 14, 1920.

After the 19th Amendment was passed, the CWSA dissolved and formed the Connecticut League of Women Voters on January 18, 1921.

== African American women and suffrage in Connecticut ==
After being influenced by Alva Belmont, and her push for including African American suffragists, the CWSA began to do their own outreach in Connecticut. Around 500 African American women came together in New Haven in 1918 to form their own suffrage group. Mary Townsend Seymour was very involved with members of the CWSA in Hartford, and took part in organizing and in demonstrations.

Connecticut senator Frank B. Brandegee wanted to exclude Black women from the right to vote.

== Anti-suffragism in Connecticut ==
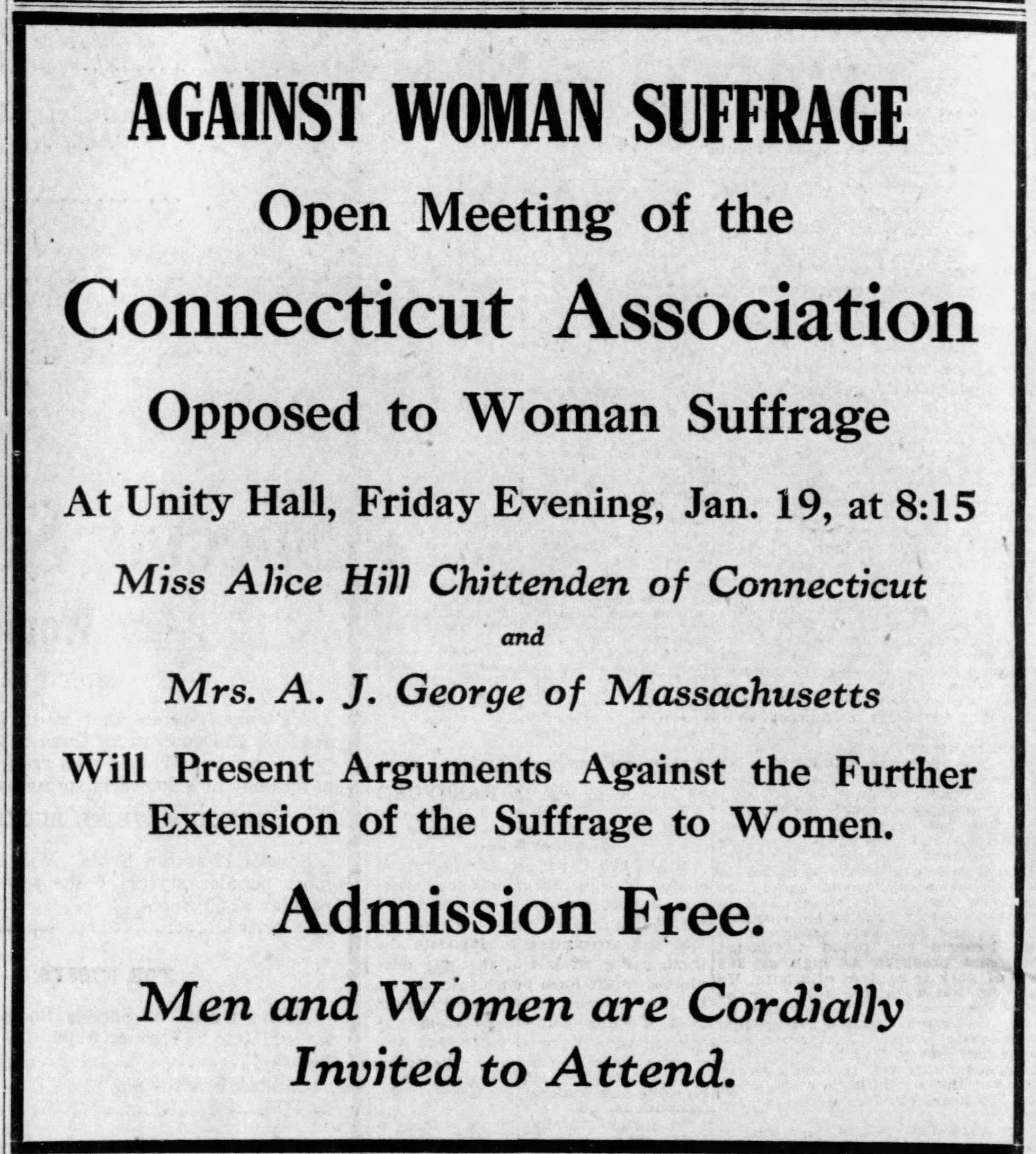
"Against Woman Suffrage" Connecticut Association Opposed to Woman Suffrage 1912

The Connecticut Association Opposed to Woman Suffrage (CAOWS) was formed in 1910 and led by Grace Markham. CAOWS hosted events and demonstrations against women's suffrage. The group expanded into 161 Connecticut cities and towns.

Prominent business owners opposed women's suffrage because they worried that women's enfranchisement would affect their own local businesses. Some businesses, such as saloons and brothels, were already targeted by the CWSA. In addition, the CWSA supported worker's rights and opposed exploitative labor practices in the state. Anti-suffragists tried to paint suffragists as anti-patriotic by "emphasizing their connections to subversives, such as communists, socialists, and pacifists."

== See also ==
- List of Connecticut suffragists
- Timeline of women's suffrage in Connecticut
- Women's suffrage in the United States
- Timeline of women's suffrage in the United States
