= Timeline of women's suffrage in Connecticut =

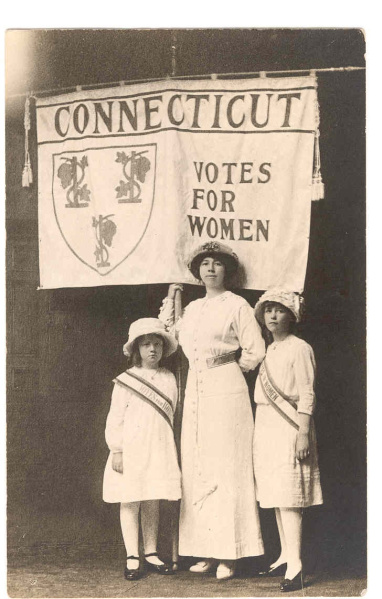
Josephine Bennett with daughters Tanya and Katherine, c. 1914

This is a timeline of women's suffrage in Connecticut. Women's suffrage efforts began in the 1860s. Later, women earned the right to vote for school officials in 1893. Connecticut ratified the Nineteenth Amendment on September 14, 1920.

== 19th century ==
=== 1860s ===
1866

- November: Hartford Courant publishes articles in favor of women's suffrage.

1867

- Frances Ellen Burr introduces a women's suffrage bill in the Connecticut General Assembly which is narrowly defeated.
- December: Susan B. Anthony and Elizabeth Cady Stanton visit Hartford.

1869

- October 29: Women's suffrage convention held in Hartford, Connecticut.
- The Connecticut Woman Suffrage Association (CWSA) is formed.

=== 1870s ===
1870

- September: CWSA held its annual meeting in Hartford.

1873

- December 15: John Hooker's opinion on the trial of Susan B. Anthony is published in the Hartford Courant. Hooker wrote that "she had the right to vote under the Fourteenth Amendment."

1874

- Anthony and Isabella Beecher Hooker speak at Cheney Hall in Manchester, Connecticut.

1877

- Married women are able to legally control their own property.

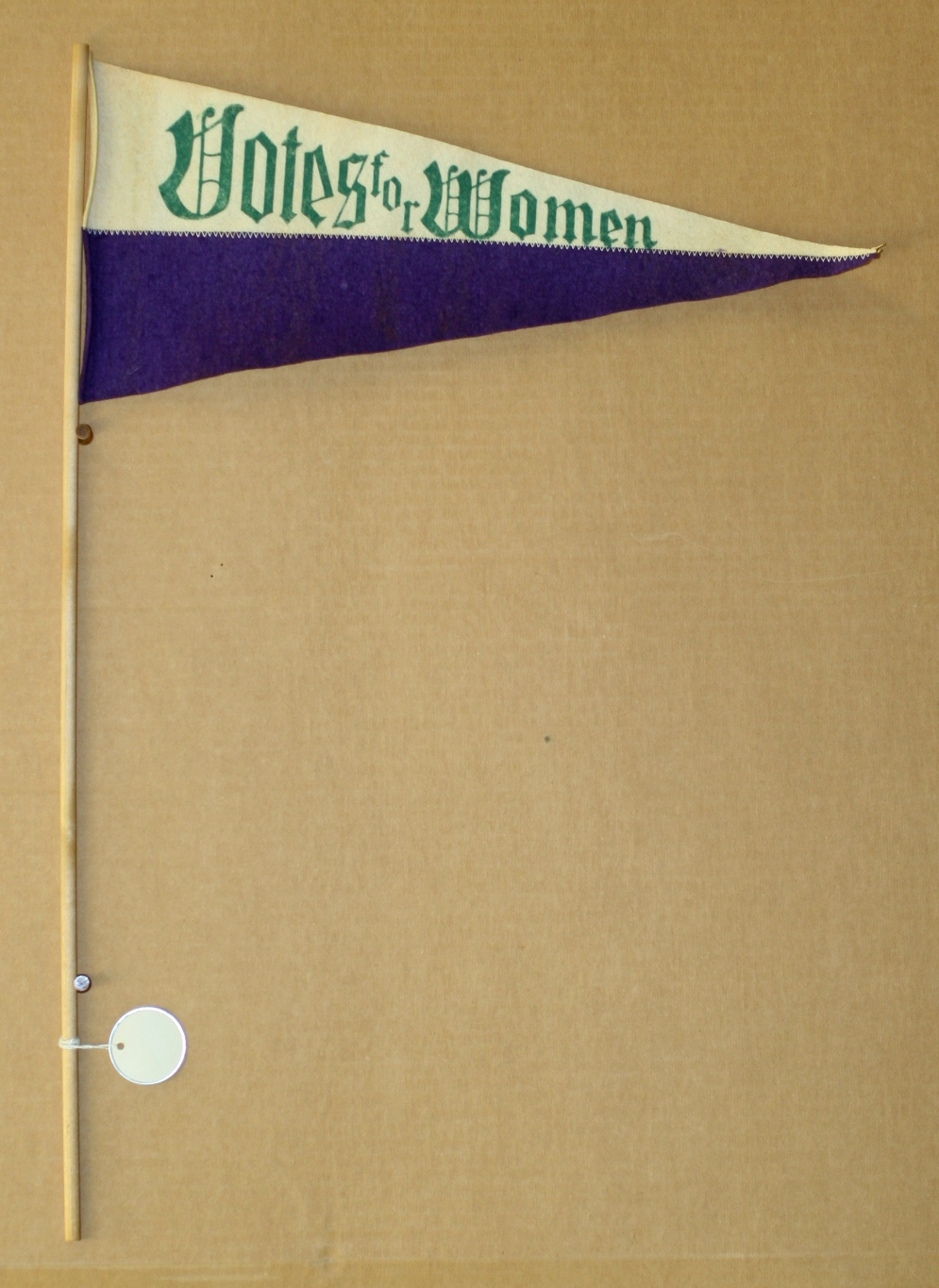
Connecticut Votes for Women Flag

=== 1880s ===
1884

- State suffrage convention is held in Hartford.
- A bill to allow women the right to vote in school district meetings loses in the state legislature.

1885

- The Hartford Equal Rights League is founded.
- The state legislature again defeats a school suffrage bill.

1886

- A bill for full women's suffrage is defeated in the state legislature.

1887

- Two women's suffrage bills in the state legislature are marked as "Ought not to pass" and go no further in committee.

1889

- The Meriden Political Equality Club was formed.

=== 1890s ===
1893

- Women gain the right to vote for school officials.
- Rose Payton is the first African American woman to register to vote in Hartford.

1894

- The Equal Rights Club of Willimantic is formed.

1895

- A presidential suffrage bill does not pass in the state legislature.
- A bill for women's municipal suffrage passes in the state House, but fails in the state Senate.

1897

- School suffrage law is amended, making voter registration more complicated.
- Bills for presidential and municipal suffrage do not pass in the state legislature.

1899

- A municipal suffrage bill does not pass again in the state legislature.

== 20th century ==
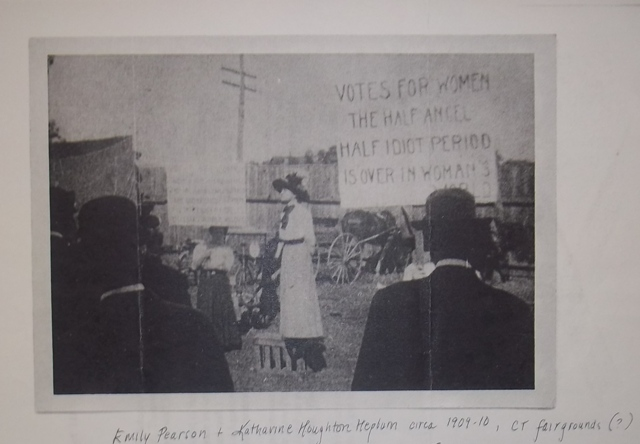
Emily Pierson and Katharine Houghton Hepburn c. 1909-1910

=== 1900s ===
1901

- The state suffrage convention is held in Hartford.

1902

- During the revisions to the Constitution of Connecticut, suffragists presented equal suffrage resolutions which were not dismissed without debate.
- The state suffrage convention is held in Collinsville, Connecticut.
- Mary Seymour Howell campaigns in Connecticut on behalf of the National American Woman Suffrage Association (NAWSA).

1903

- The state suffrage convention is held at the home of Isabella Beecher Hooker in Hartford.

1905

- November: The state suffrage convention is held in Hartford.

1906

- The state suffrage convention is held in Meriden, Connecticut.

1907

- October: Suffragists hold their state convention in Hartford.

1909

- The state suffrage convention is held in Meriden.
- Women gain the right to vote on school and library issues.
- October: Emmeline Pankhurst visits and speaks in Hartford.
- The Hartford Political Equality League (later called the Hartford Equal Franchise League) is formed.

=== 1910s ===
1910

- The Connecticut Association Opposed to Woman Suffrage (CAOWS) is formed.
- Fall: The state suffrage convention is held in Greenwich.
- At the Greenwich annual farmer's picnic, suffragists from CWSA invited Ella Reeve Bloor to speak.

1911

- Activists hold the state suffrage convention in Bridgeport.
- August 1: Suffrage auto tour arrives in Watertown.
- August 22: Suffrage auto tour arrives in Norfolk.

1912

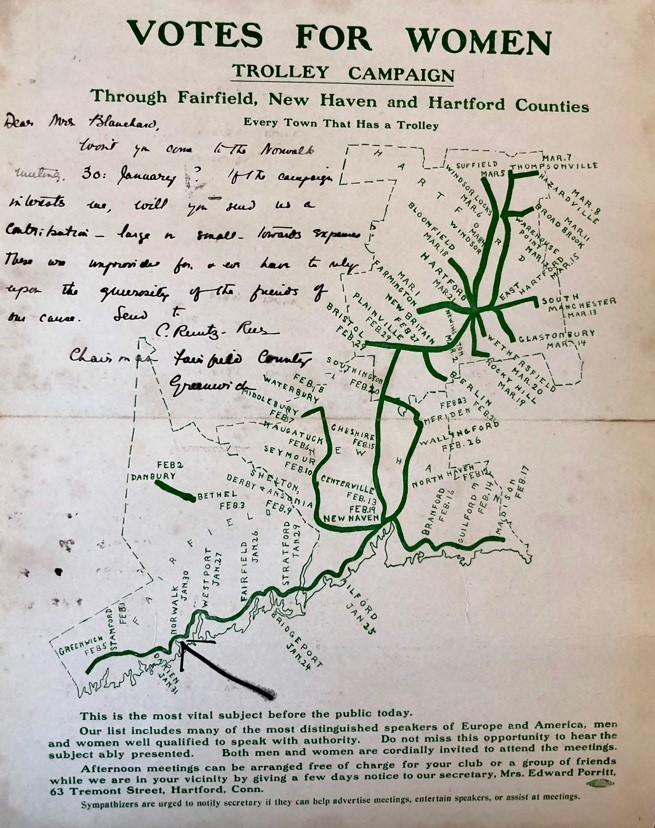
Votes for Women Trolley Campaign through Connecticut in 1912

- January 24: The CWSA trolley campaign kicks off.
- January 25: The trolley campaign held a rally in Milford.
- February 20: The Trolley Campaign has a reception in Southington.
- February 28: The trolley campaign holds a suffrage meeting in Bristol.
- March 28: Last event of the trolley campaign is held in Hartford.
- Hartford suffrage groups send postcards to people in surrounding areas in order to advertise women's suffrage events.
- The annual suffrage convention is held in New Haven, Connecticut.
- The New Haven Political Equality Club is founded after the convention.

1913

- July: The Wallingford Equal Franchise League raises money and awareness by selling food and giving away brochures at July 4th events.
- The state suffrage convention is held in Hartford.
- August 8: How the Vote Was Won, produced by The Connecticut Players opens and tours the state.
- November: Pankhurst gives a speech in Hartford for CWSA called "Freedom or Death."

1914

- May 2: Thousands march in suffrage parade through Hartford.
- Summer: CWSA holds a "rowboat platform" at beaches in Connecticut, sharing information about women's suffrage to beach-goers.
- June: A car tour supporting women's suffrage started through Connecticut.
- September: CWSA staff a booth at the Connecticut Fair Grounds, providing suffrage literature and outreach.
- The annual suffrage convention is held in Hartford.

1915

- October: State suffrage convention is held in Hartford.

1916

- The Connecticut branch of the National Woman's Party (NWP) is formed.
- A large parade with thousands of participants and spectators takes place in New Haven.
- September 7: The Connecticut State Federation of Labor votes in favor of women's suffrage.
- The state suffrage convention is held in New Haven.

1917

- February: The Connecticut House judiciary committee hears testimony from both CWSA and from anti-suffragists on women voting in Connecticut.
- November 7-8: Forty-eighth annual state suffrage convention is held in Hartford.

1918

- The Connecticut Federation of Labor endorses the Nineteenth Amendment almost unanimously.
- African American suffragists organize their own suffrage league in New Haven.
- Spring: CWSA starts a political literacy and citizenship education campaign for women.
- July 12: Suffragists form rallies in Hartford and Simsbury, Connecticut and decide to appeal directly to the President on the question of women's suffrage.
- States suffrage convention is held in Hartford.

1919

- The Actual Government of Connecticut, created by CWSA, is published by the National American Woman Suffrage Publishing Company.
- January 8: Josephine Bennett, a member of the NWP, is arrested for burning Woodrow Wilson's speech in front of the White House.
- January 18: The Connecticut League of Women Voters is founded in New Haven.
- March 10: The Prison Special stops in Hartford.
- The annual suffrage convention is held in Bridgeport.

=== 1920s ===
1920

- May 3-7: "Emergency Week" is declared in regards to blocking the vote on women's suffrage. The Suffrage Emergency Corps is assembled to support the federal amendment.
- September 14: Connecticut state legislature ratifies the Nineteenth Amendment.

1921

- January 18: The Connecticut League of Women Voters is formed.

== See also ==
- List of Connecticut suffragists
- Women's suffrage in Connecticut
- Women's suffrage in the United States
- Timeline of women's suffrage in the United States
