= St. John the Baptist School =

St. John the Baptist School may refer to:

== India ==
- St. John the Baptist High School, Thane

== United Kingdom ==
- St. John the Baptist School (Aberdare), Wales
- St. John the Baptist School (Woking), Surrey

== United States ==
- St. John the Baptist Parish School Board, Louisiana
- St. John the Baptist School (Minnesota)
- St. John the Baptist High School (St. Louis, Missouri)
- St. John The Baptist School (Alden, New York)
- St. John The Baptist School (Peabody, Massachusetts)
- St. John the Baptist Diocesan High School, West Islip, New York
