= SJB =

SJB may refer to:

- Hochkirchliche St.-Johannes-Bruderschaft, a German High Church Lutheran religious society
- Sajau Basap language's ISO code
- San Joaquín Airport's IATA code

In schools:

- St. Jean de Brebeuf Catholic High School, Woodbridge, Ontario, Canada
- St. Jean de Brebeuf Secondary School, Hamilton, Ontario, Canada
- St John the Baptist School, Woking, Surrey, England, United Kingdom
- St. John The Baptist School (Alden, New York), United States
- St. John the Baptist Diocesan High School, West Islip, New York, United States
- St John Bosco Arts College, Liverpool, England

Automotive:

- Smart Junction Box, a junction box, usually with microcontroller, for addition functions

Other:

- Samagi Jana Balawegaya, Sri Lankan political party

== See also ==
- Saint-Jean-Baptiste Society or SSJB
