= Caroline Ruutz-Rees =

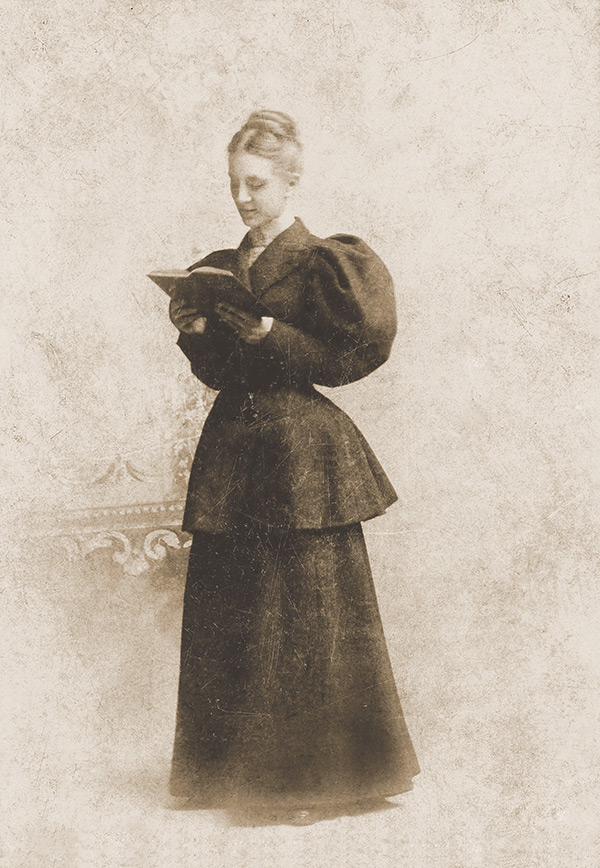
Caroline-Ruutz-Rees in 1890.

Caroline Ruutz-Rees (August 16, 1865 – February 15, 1954) was a British–American academic, educator, and suffragist. Ruutz-Rees was very involved in the women's suffrage movement in Connecticut. She served as the first head teacher of Rosemary Hall. She was also a member of the executive board of the Connecticut Woman Suffrage Association (CWSA).

== Biography ==
Ruutz-Rees was born in London on August 16, 1865. She attended private schools in London. Ruutz-Rees came to the United States around 1882 or 1883, eventually becoming a naturalized citizen. The next year, she started teaching at the St. John the Baptist School in New York and later, at the St. Mary's School in Burlington, New Jersey. In the years of 1898 and 1899, she studied advanced Greek courses at Yale's graduate school.

In 1890, she started working as headmistress of Rosemary Hall, in Wallingford. The curriculum of Rosemary Hall was strong in the humanities, with Ruutz-Rees working "to empower young women to pursue a wide variety of intellectual studies." The school, under her direction, was one of the first American girls' schools to require Uniforms. Ruutz-Rees' method of teaching and administrating the school was based on English girls' schools. In 1900, the school was moved to Greenwich. She went to Scotland to study at St. Andrew's University, earning her degree in 1904. She studied French literature in Grenoble and in Paris. Ruutz-Rees earned her master's degree in 1909 and her doctorate in 1910 from Columbia University. She wrote articles about French Literature for the Modern Language Association and wrote for Modern Language Notes, Romantic Review and the Yale Review. In 1910, she published a book about Charles de Sainte-Marthe, Charles de Sainte-Marthe: A Study in French Renaissance.

Ruutz-Rees was very involved in the women's suffrage movement in Connecticut. She was part of the executive board of the Connecticut Woman Suffrage Association (CWSA), served as vice president of the American Woman Suffrage Association, and was a founding member of the Greenwich Equal Franchise League. Ruutz-Rees also founded the National Junior Suffrage Corps around 1914. Ruutz-Rees participated in a large women's suffrage parade in Hartford in 1919. The suffragists presented a 27,000 signature petition in support of the women's vote to the Connecticut state legislature. During World War I, Ruutz-Rees served as the chair of the Woman's Committee of Connecticut's Council of Defense. She held the chair for more than a year, and resigned due to her other commitments. She was also a supporter of the Woman's Land Army. At Rosemary Hall, Ruutz-Rees had students plant and care for community war gardens.

Ruutz-Rees continued to participate in civic life after women won the vote. In 1920, she was appointed to the executive committee of the Democratic National Committee. In 1922, she was considered a possible Democratic candidate for the U.S. Senate.

Ruutz-Rees turned over the full-time administration of the school to Eugenia Baker Jessup in 1938 and continued to work with the school after her retirement. During her life, she adopted two children. Ruutz-Rees died in her home in Greenwich on February 15, 1954.
