= National Junior Suffrage Corps =

Women's suffrage organization

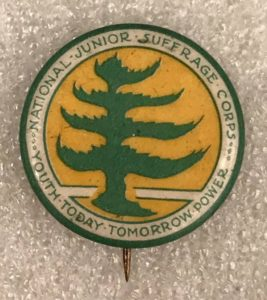
Pin of the National Junior Suffrage Corps, designed by Elmer Livingston McRae.

The National Junior Suffrage Corps were a women's suffrage organization for young people ages seventeen and under. The group was formed by Connecticut suffragist, Caroline Ruutz-Rees, and the logos and designs were created by artist, Elmer MacRae.

== About ==
Suffragist and educator, Caroline Ruutz-Rees, created the National Junior Suffrage Corps in 1914. The National American Woman Suffrage Association (NAWSA) raised funds to help recruit interested members. Members of the group were all under age seventeen and consisted of young people interested in women's suffrage. The motto was "Youth Today, Tomorrow Power."

Activities of the group included assisting suffragists with various projects, such as acting as assistants during lectures or getting signatures for petitions. The first group was formed in Columbia, South Carolina. The Birmingham, Alabama group created a unique suffrage chant. An all-boys group was started in Lexington, Kentucky.

The badge of the Junior Suffrage Corps was designed by artist Elmer MacRae.

== See also ==
- Connecticut Woman Suffrage Association (CWSA)
- National American Woman Suffrage Association (NAWSA)
