= Mary Townsend Seymour =

American politician (1873–1957)

- Born: May 10, 1873; Hartford, Connecticut, US
- Died: January 12, 1957 (aged 83); Hartford, Connecticut, US
- Occupations: Politician, activist
- Organization: NAACP
- Spouse: Frederick Seymour (m. 1891)

Mary Townsend Seymour (May 10, 1873 – January 12, 1957) was an American activist and politician who was the first African-American woman in Connecticut (and among the first in the United States) to run for state office.

== Biography ==
Mary Townsend was born in Hartford, Connecticut on May 10, 1873. Her parents died while she was a teenager. Prior to her mother's death, she was adopted by the family of the American Civil War veteran and social activist Lloyd G. Seymour. In June 1888, at the age of fifteen, she visited the City Hall to review her birth certificates and declared her official name as Mary Emma Townsend Seymour.

In 1891, she married Frederick Seymour, a member of the Seymour family.

Many African Americans at the time had migrated north from the southern United States. In Hartford, school officials considered segregating the schools. Seymour and her husband, along with 20 other local residents, began organizing for civil rights. On October 9, 1917, the Hartford chapter of the National Association for the Advancement of Colored People (NAACP) was founded, with Seymour serving as its spokesperson. As part of her activities with the NAACP, she went undercover to investigate the treatment of women tobacco workers, and worked to publicize their plight. An account of Mary's undercover work was published in the NAACP's newsletter The Crisis in June 1920 under the title "A Woman's Work."

In 1918, she helped form Hartford's equal rights advocacy chapter of the Circle For Negro War Relief, to help black soldiers' families during the war. Around the same time, she also joined the Colored Women's League of Hartford. In 1919, when suffragists were working to have the Nineteenth Amendment to the United States Constitution passed prohibiting any United States citizen from being denied the right to vote on the basis of sex, Seymour campaigned to ensure that black women's right to vote would also be protected.

Around 1920, Seymour joined the American Red Cross and worked with African-American women tobacco packers. She and fellow activist Josephine Bennett interviewed female laborers, and co-wrote an exposé on the subject for The Crisis in 1920.

In 1920, Seymour became the first African-American woman to run for the Connecticut General Assembly. She did not win, but was the first African-American woman to run for this position.

She died in Hartford on January 12, 1957 and is buried in Hartford's Old North Cemetery. Her grave is a site on the Connecticut Freedom Trail.

In 1997, Mary Seymour Place was opened in Hartford, to provide supportive housing for homeless women and children.

She was inducted into the Connecticut Women's Hall of Fame in 2006.
