= Catherine Flanagan =

American suffragist (1888–1927)

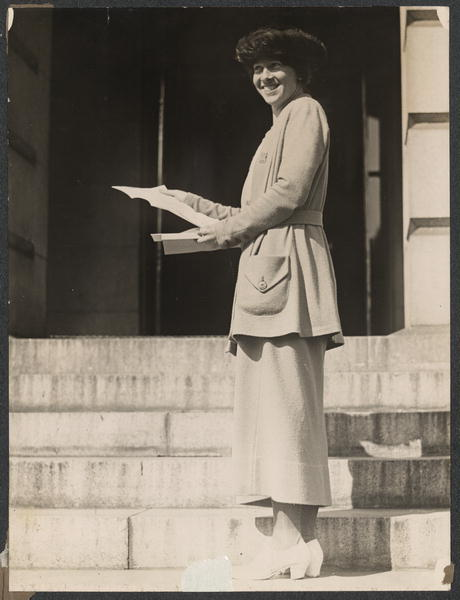
- Flanagan in 1920 delivering Connecticut's ratification of the 19th Amendment to the Secretary of State
- Born: Catherine Mary Flanagan; August 19, 1888; Hartford, Connecticut, U.S.
- Died: August 3, 1927 (aged 38); Salt Lake City, Utah, U.S.
- Occupation: Suffragist
- Spouse: William H. Leary (m. 1921)
- Children: 1

Catherine Mary Flanagan (August 19, 1888 – August 3, 1927) was an American suffragist affiliated with the Connecticut Woman Suffrage Association and later the National Woman's Party. She was among the Silent Sentinels arrested for protesting outside the White House in 1917.

== Biography ==
Catherine Mary Flanagan was born on August 19, 1888, in Hartford, Connecticut, the second of seven children of Irish immigrant parents. Her father had moved to the US as a political exile after participating in the Irish Freedom movement, and following his death, she began work as a stenographer and as a bookkeeper at age 13. She became involved in the women's suffrage movement in the 1910s, and was hired as the secretary of the Connecticut Woman Suffrage Association (CWSA) in 1915. In 1917, Flanagan took vacation leave to travel to Washington, D.C., to join the National Woman's Party (NWP) in the Silent Sentinels protest outside the White House. Flanagan and five other suffragists were arrested on charges of "obstructing traffic and unlawful assembly" and were jailed at the Occoquan Workhouse for 30 days after they refused to pay a $10 fine. After her release, Flanagan wrote an account of her treatment in jail that was circulated in the national press and attracted public support for the suffrage movement. She resigned from the CWSA and formally joined the NWP. In 1920, she delivered Connecticut's ratification document endorsing the Nineteenth Amendment to the State Department. Following the passage of the amendment, she turned her attention to campaigning for recognition of the Irish Republic.

Flanagan moved to Utah and married William H. Leary in 1921; a year later, they had a son. She died August 3, 1927, in Salt Lake City from complications of an ectopic pregnancy.

== Legacy ==
Flanagan was inducted into the Connecticut Women's Hall of Fame in 2020. She is memorialized at the Turning Point Suffragist Memorial in Lorton, Virginia.
