= Suffrage Emergency Corps =

American suffragette group

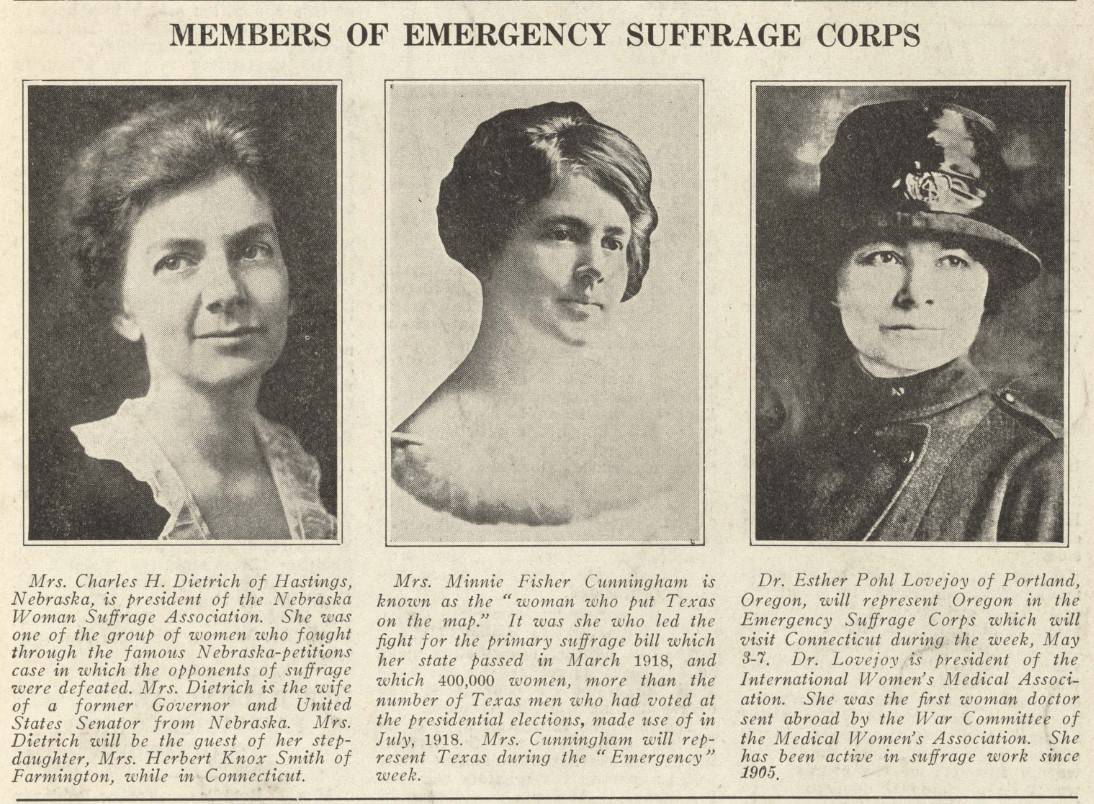
Suffrage Emergency Corps members, Margretta Dietrich, Minnie Fisher Cunningham, and Esther Pohl Lovejoy, April 1920

The Suffrage Emergency Corps was a special group of suffragists formed after nearly two-thirds of the states had ratified the Nineteenth Amendment to the United States Constitution. Only one more state was needed to ratify, and suffragists hoped they could convince Governor Marcus H. Holcomb to make his state of Connecticut the thirty-sixth. A team of women, sponsored by the National American Woman Suffrage Association (NAWSA) chose delegates from the other states to travel to Connecticut in early May 1920 to convince the governor to open a special legislative session to consider ratifying the amendment. The event garnered publicity, but it did not convince the governor to proceed with the session.

== About ==
After the Nineteenth Amendment to the United States Constitution was passed, many states ratified it immediately, or called emergency special legislative sessions to consider the amendment. By April, the suffragists only needed one more state to ratify the amendment. Connecticut Governor, Marcus H. Holcomb, received petitions to open a special emergency legislative session, but he responded that "the desire of a few women did not create an emergency." After further appeals, the governor stated that "he was ready to receive proof of the existence of an emergency."

In response, the National American Woman Suffrage Association (NAWSA) announced on April 23 that they would create a special "emergency" group to petition for the ratification of the 19th Amendment. A "flying squadron" of 48 women, representing each state in the United States, was chosen to arrive in Connecticut early in May for the event. Women chosen to be part of the Corps were prominent leaders in various areas of endeavor. Many of the women had professional jobs or had served in office in their states, and many of them were very involved with the Republican Party.

Members of the Corps wanted to show that there was a "special emergency" in the case of women's suffrage so that the governor of Connecticut would call a special legislative session to consider the ratification. Groups such as the Federation of Women's Clubs were involved with the push for women's suffrage. Arrangements were made by NAWSA who wanted to "make Connecticut the 36th" and thereby pass the Nineteenth Amendment. Preparations for the event included placards spread around the state that read: "The eyes of the nation are upon Connecticut."

After arriving in New York, members dined with Carrie Chapman Catt at the Hotel McAlpin. Katharine Ludington, the president of the Connecticut Woman Suffrage Association (CWSA), gave the keynote speech. After the dinner, members of the Corps received "marching orders" from Catt and Ludington.

On May 3, forty-six of the members of the corps arrived in Hartford, Connecticut where they were met by a group of Connecticut women who took them to lunch at the Hartford Golf Club. After lunch, the Corps broke up into groups of 12 who would go on to attend mass meetings in Bridgeport, New Haven, New London, and Waterbury. Over the next few days, twelve rallies featuring the women of the Suffrage Emergency Corps were held each day. Catt spoke on May 3 in New Haven to a full meeting house. On May 5, members of the Corps visited Niantic, Connecticut. A total of 40 meetings were held over four days leading up to May 7, when the suffragists would meet with the governor of Connecticut.

On May 7, the suffragists held a public rally and had a hearing in front of the Connecticut Governor Holcomb. They arrived at the Capitol in 48 separate cars decorated with green, white, and purple flags and waving banners. Catt had been scheduled to speak, but was delayed. The remaining speakers were introduced by Ludington and included Minnie Fisher Cunningham, Grace Raymond Hebard, Lenna Lowe Yost, and Helen Ring Robinson. Suffragists then presented telegrams from the governors of Wyoming and Kentucky urging Holcomb to open a special legislative session. There was another small procession, with further speeches and entreaties to the governor to support women's suffrage. One of the speeches, given by the Arkansas delegate, related her experiences during World War I where she told a French woman that not all American women could vote. The French woman replied, "That is not a democracy; it's a conundrum."

After the public rally, Governor Holcomb stated that "he would give careful consideration to the request for a special session." However, by the following Tuesday, he declared that while there was a "strong desire for a special session," the suffragists had not been able to prove to him that there was a "special emergency." Additional petitions to the state legislature were also not successful.

=== Members ===
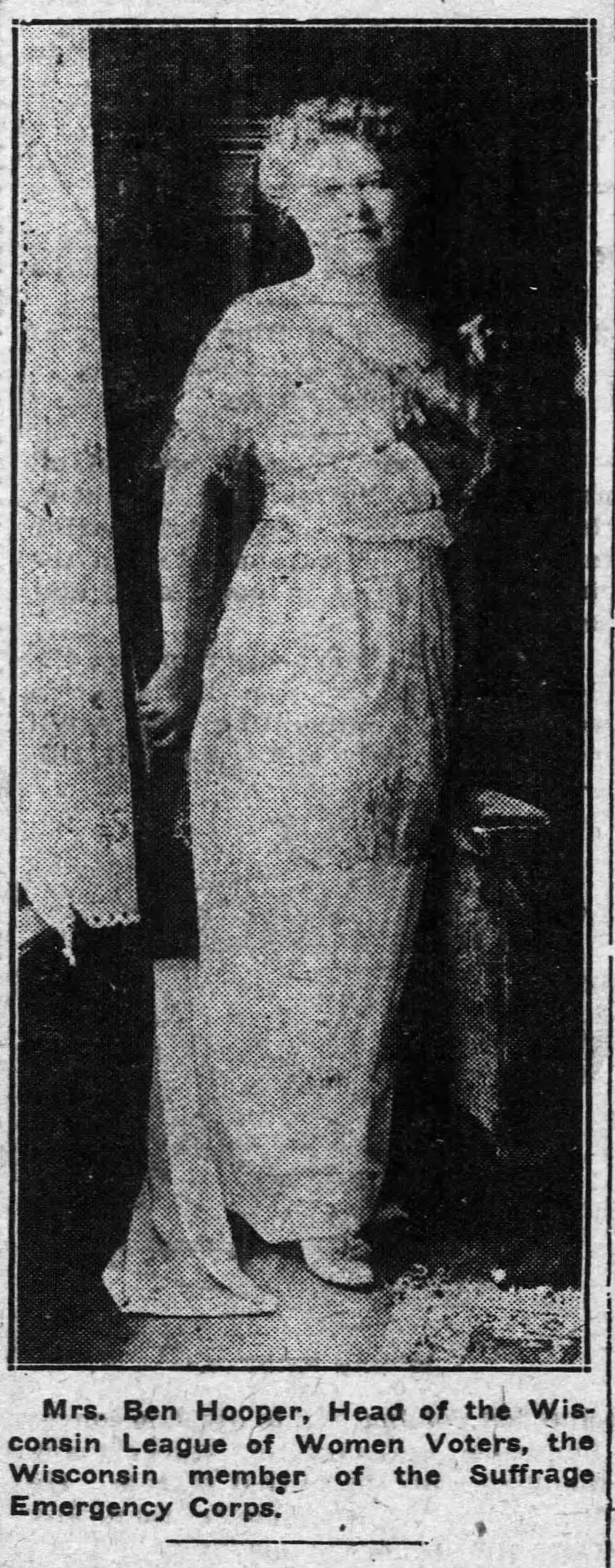
- Jessie Jack Hooper, Wisconsin member of the Suffrage Emergency Corps, May 1920
  Mrs. Arthur Balentine, Maine.
- Ida Porter Boyer, Massachusetts.
- Mrs. Desha Breckinridge, Kentucky.
- Jane Brooks, Kansas.
- Grace Clendenning, North Dakota.
- Edith Clark Cowles, Virginia.
- Minnie Fisher Cunningham, Texas.
- Mrs. James A. Devitt, Iowa.
- Margretta Dietrich, Nebraska.
- Mrs. John Kreig, Tennessee.
- Mrs. Charles E. Ellicott, Maryland.
- Nelle Fick, Washington.
- Mrs. John Fuller, Florida.
- Anne Macomber Gannett, Maine.
- Mrs. E. A. Gould (née Frances Bearss), Indiana.
- Grace Raymond Hebard, Wyoming.
- Jessie Jack Hooper, Wisconsin.
- Mrs. Robert J. Huse, New Jersey.
- Pattie R. Jacobs, Alabama.
- Esther Pohl Lovejoy, Oregon.
- Margaret Hill McCarter, Kansas.
- Helen Guthrie Miller, Missouri.
- Josephine Miller, Arkansas.
- Rose Moriarty, Ohio.
- Frances Munds, Arizona.
- Mrs. Andreas Neland, Minnesota.
- Lilian Olzendam, Vermont.
- Kathryn Perham (Mrs. Wallace Perham), Montana.
- Mamie Shields Pyle, South Dakota.
- Helen Ring Robinson, Colorado.
- Mrs. Julian Salley, South Carolina.
- Mrs. B. F. Saunders, Mississippi.
- Mrs. Edward Seward Simons, California.
- Mrs. A. B. Stroup, New Mexico.
- Mrs. M. J. Sweeley, Idaho.
- Grace Wilbur Trout, Illinois.
- Mrs. Andreas Ueland, Minnesota.
- Elizabeth Werlein, Louisiana.
- Leah D. Widtsoe, Utah.
- Mary Inez Wood, New Hampshire.
- Annie Wright, Georgia.
- Lenna Lowe Yost, West Virginia.

== See also ==
- List of suffragists and suffragettes
