= Grace Gallatin Seton Thompson =

American author and suffragist

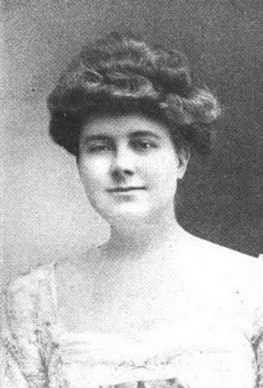
- Thompson, from a 1907 publication
- Born: January 28, 1872; Sacramento, California, US
- Died: March 19, 1959 (aged 87); Palm Beach, Florida, US
- Occupations: Writer, suffragist
- Spouse: Ernest Thompson Seton (m. 1896; div. 1935)
- Children: Anya Seton

Grace Gallatin Seton Thompson (January 28, 1872 – March 19, 1959) was an American writer and suffragist.

== Early life and education ==
Grace Gallatin was born in Sacramento, California on January 28, 1872. In 1888 she began writing articles for San Francisco newspapers under the pen name of Dorothy Dodge, and in 1892 graduated from Packer Collegiate Institute, in Brooklyn, NY.

== Career ==
=== Writing ===
In 1900, Seton published her first book, A Woman Tenderfoot, which described her trip on horseback through the Rocky Mountains. In 1907 she published the book Nimrod's Wife, a true hunting and travel book set in the Western United States. She later organized and directed a women's motor unit to aid soldiers in France during the first World War. During the 1920s and 1930s she visited China, Egypt, Hawaii, India, Indochina, Japan, and South America, and she wrote four books about her travels: A Woman Tenderfoot in Egypt (1923), Chinese Lanterns (1924), Yes, Lady Saheb (1925), and Poison Arrows (1938). She also wrote The Singing Traveler (1947), a collection of poems about mysticism and eastern religions.

=== Activism ===
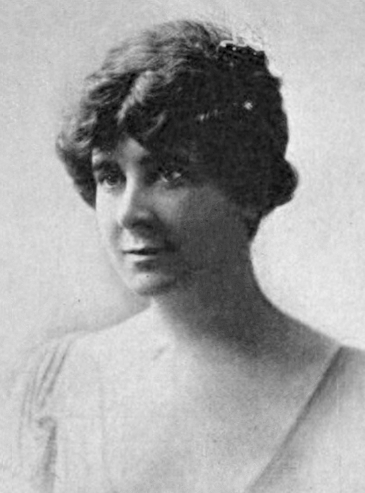
Grace Gallatin Seton Thompson (1919)

As a suffragist, she served as vice-president and later president of the Connecticut Woman Suffrage Association, from 1910 to 1920. She also worked for women's causes by serving as president of the National League of American Pen Women (1926-1928 and 1930–1932), during which time the number of branches of that organization doubled, and serving as chair of letters of the National Council of Women of the United States (1933–1938). As chair she established the Biblioteca Femina, a collection of volumes by women from all over the world, which was later donated to the Northwestern University Library. She also helped organize an international conference of women writers at the Century of Progress Exposition held in Chicago in 1933, and was a member of the International Council of Women, the Society of Woman Geographers, and the Women's National Republican Club. Seton also belonged to Pen and Brush. She served as president of Pen and Brush from 1898 to 1939.

== Marriage ==
She was married to Ernest Thompson Seton, one of the founding pioneers of the Boy Scouts of America, and conflicts arose with the Boy Scouts about her suffrage activities and his British citizenship. The citizenship issue arose partly because of his high position within BSA, and because the federal charter James E. West was attempting to obtain for the BSA required its board members to be United States citizens. Ernest drafted his written resignation on January 29, 1915, but he did not send it to BSA until May.

Grace had married Ernest in 1896; she separated from him by the late 1920s, and they divorced in 1935. Her daughter Anya Seton, also an author, was born in 1904.

== Death ==
Seton died in Palm Beach, Florida on March 19, 1959.

== Legacy ==
Some of her papers are held in the Arthur and Elizabeth Schlesinger Library on the History of Women in America, and some are held at Smith College in the Sophia Smith Collection.

== Works ==
=== Books ===
- A Woman Tenderfoot (1900) Doubleday, Page and Co.
- Nimrod's Wife (1907) Doubleday, Page and Co.
- Woman Tenderfoot in Egypt (1923) New York: Dodd, Mead and Co.
- Chinese Lanterns (1924) New York: Dodd, Mead and Co. [published in London in 1924 by John Lane, Bodley Head]
- "Yes, Lady Saheb": A Woman's Adventurings with Mysterious India (1925) New York and London: Harper and Brothers
- Log of the "Look-See" A Half-Year in the Wilds of Matto Grosso and the Paraguayan Forest, Over the Andes to Peru (1932) London: Hurst & Blackett, Ltd.
- Magic Waters: Through the Wilds of Matto Grosso and Beyond (1933) New York: E.P. Dutton & Co, Inc.
- Poison Arrows: Strange Journey with an Opium Dealer: Annam, Cambodia, Siam and the Lotus Isle of Bali (1936) London: J. Gifford Ltd.
- Partial Survey of Women's Work in the Literary Field (1939) New York (with the National Council of Women of the United States and the International Council of Women)
- Biblioteca Femina (1939) (with Northwestern University Library, the National Council of Women of the United States, and the International Council of Women)
- The Singing Traveler (1947) Boston: The Christopher Publishing House

=== Books with Ernest Thompson Seton ===
- The Trail of the Sandhill Stag (1899) New York: Charles Scribner's Sons
- The Biography of a Grizzly (1899) New York: Grosset & Dunlap
- Two Little Savages Being the Adventures of Two Boys Who Lived as Indians and What They Learned (1904) London: Archibald Constable & Co. Ltd.
- Animal Heroes (1905) New York: Grosset & Dunlap
- Woodmyth & Fable (1905) New York: The Century Co.
- The Biography of a Silver Fox, or, Domino Reynard of Goldur Town (1909) London: A. Constable
- Wild Animal Ways (1917) London and New York: Hodder and Stoughton
- The Biography of a Grizzly (1918) The Century Co.
- Wild Animals at Home (1926) London: Hodder and Stoughton
- The Trail of the Sandhill Stag (1929) New York: C. Scribner's Sons

=== Musical scores ===
- "My Love Is a Blossom, Heigh O!" (1927) New York City: E. Morris Music Pub Co. (with Marianne Genet)
- "Lotus Blossom" (1927) New York City: E. Morris Music Pub Co. (with Marianne Genet)
- "A Canton Boat Woman" (1927) New York City: E. Morris Music Pub Co. (with Marianne Genet)
- "Lily of Arcadie" (1932) New York: H.W. Gray (with Marianne Genet)
