= Elizabeth D. Bacon =

American suffragist and educator (1844–1917)

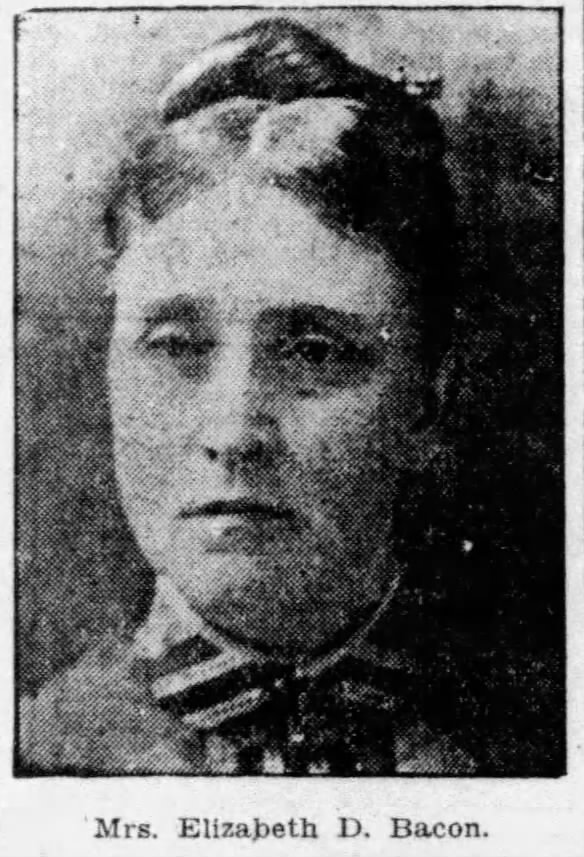
Elizabeth D. Bacon, picture from Hartford Courant, 1917

Elizabeth Daken Bacon (March 19, 1844 – December 12, 1917) was an American suffragist and educator. She served as president of the Connecticut Woman Suffrage Association (CWSA) from 1906 to 1910.

== Biography ==
Elizabeth Daken Bacon was born on March 19, 1844, in Cranston, Rhode Island. Bacon's grandfather, John Wilbur, was a Quaker minister and led a split in Quaker theology. Bacon went to public school in Providence, Rhode Island, and attended Providence High School, graduating in 1864. She taught public school for a few years before she married James Gillispie Bacon in Providence on October 6, 1869. The couple had one daughter in 1873.

Bacon was involved with the Woman's Christian Temperance Union (WCTU) and became interested in women's suffrage. She was a member of the Hartford Equal Rights Club. She testified before the United States Congress Committee on Woman Suffrage on January 28, 1896. She was also involved with women voter registration and school board issues. In 1906, she became president of the Connecticut Woman Suffrage Association (CWSA), serving in that capacity until 1910. Bacon's daughter, Ellen M. Bolles, followed in her mother's footsteps and had served as secretary of the Rhode Island Woman Suffrage Association.

Bacon died on December 12, 1917, from burn injuries sustained in her home while doing housework. She was buried next to her husband in the Old North Cemetery.
