= St. John the Baptist High School (St. Louis) =

Coordinates: 38.579918°N 90.265271°W

Location
- 5021 Adkins Ave; St. Louis, Missouri 63116; United States

Information
- Type: Private, Coeducational
- Religious affiliation: Roman Catholic
- Opened: 1922
- Founder: Father John Peters
- Status: Closed
- Closed: 2008
- School district: Archdiocese of Saint Louis
- Grades: 9 - 12
- Colors: Blue and gold
- Mascot: Victor E. Lion
- Team name: Lions
- Affiliation: Roman Catholic Church

St. John the Baptist High School was a parochial, Catholic high school in St. Louis, Missouri. It was located in the Roman Catholic Archdiocese of Saint Louis.

The school opened in 1922 as a two-year, all male business school. By 1930, the high school became a co-ed, four-year, accredited high school. The high school building and program expanded several times. Eight more classrooms were added in 1934, and in 1938, the gym, cafeteria, and four more classrooms were added. In 1946, another wing was added to the original high school building, including the library and additional classrooms.

The high school closed in May 2008, and in fall 2009, the grade school program with pre-kindergarten through 8 moved to the former high school building. The grade school later closed in May 2014. The building currently sits empty, but the Catholic Charities Office of the Archdiocese of St. Louis plans to move into the former high school building after some renovation.
