= Josephine Bennett =

American activist and suffragist

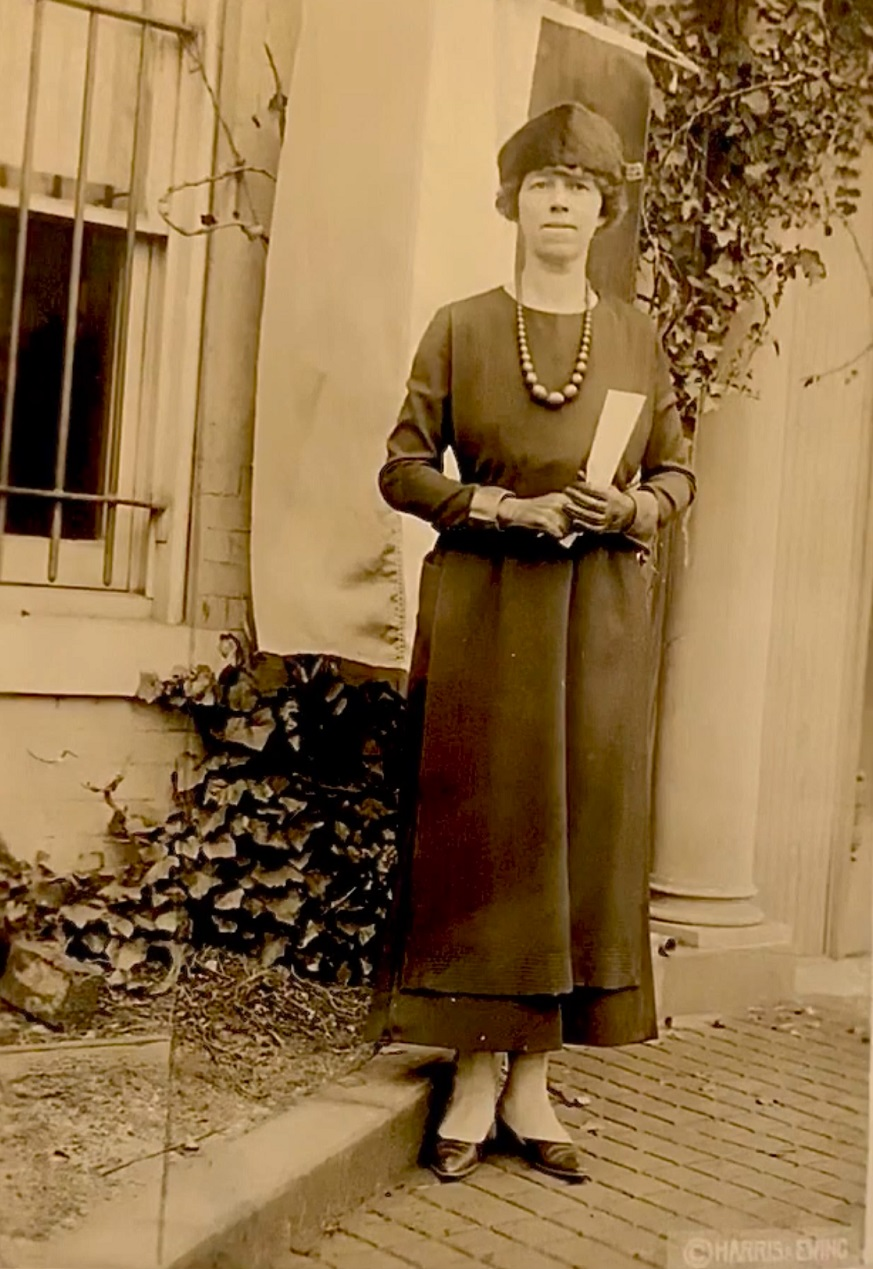
Josephine Bennett in Washington, D.C. in January 1919

Josephine Day Bennett (May 4, 1880 - June 12, 1961) was an American activist and suffragist from Connecticut. She was a member of the National Women's Party (NWP) and campaigned for women's suffrage outside of the White House, leading to her arrest. Bennett was also involved in other social issues and was supportive of striking workers.

== Biography ==
Bennett was born on May 4, 1880, to George Herbert and Katherine Beach Day. She married M. Toscan Bennett, who was a corporate lawyer, suffragist, and a supporter of organized labor. Along with her mother and Katherine Houghton Hepburn, Bennett organized women in Hartford to oppose prostitution. On April 5, 1911, she gave her first suffrage speech at the Connecticut State Capitol. During 1913, she travelled the state and organized a suffrage group in West Hartford. That year, she and her husband moved to Forest Street in Hartford where they also build a two-car garage. Bennett became the first Hartford woman to drive a car. In 1914, she organized a 1,000-strong suffrage parade in Hartford. Later that year, she spoke to a Congressional committee in Washington, D.C., supporting the Susan B. Anthony bill. The press called her a "brilliant orator."

In 1917, Bennett joined the National Women's Party (NWP). She chose to join the more militant group of suffragists because she favored more aggressive tactics for advocating for women's suffrage. As the United States entered World War I, Bennett felt that women should be given the right to vote as a "war measure." Bennett was also angry that President Woodrow Wilson had backed down on his promise to support a federal women's suffrage amendment and in early 1919, burned a copy of his speech. She was arrested for her act of civil disobedience and spent five days in jail, during which she participated in a hunger strike.

In 1920, she was nominated to run for the U.S. Senate by the Farmer-Labor party. Around this time, Bennett and her husband founded the Brookwood Labor College in Katonah, New York, where students could learn about sociology, history, and other subjects. She vocally supported workers' rights to organize. As they worked on the college, the Bennetts downsized their estate and moved to Katonah. During the 1922 election, Bennett unsuccessfully ran for Connecticut Attorney General. Among her other interests were birth control and civil rights for African Americans. She worked with Hepburn, leading the Connecticut Birth Control League, which later became Planned Parenthood. Bennett was one of the founders of the NAACP chapter in Hartford.

In 1924, she moved to Paris. Around two years later, she and her husband were divorced. In December of 1930, Bennett married an artist, Ricard Brooks. She was a 1931 honoree for Connecticut and listed at the NWP headquarters. Bennett died in Hartford on June 12, 1961. Bennett was inducted into the Connecticut Women's Hall of Fame in 2020. She was featured on "I Voted" stickers, designed by Pamela Hovland for a 2020 Election Day campaign.
