= Old North Cemetery (Hartford, Connecticut) =

- U.S. National Register of Historic Places
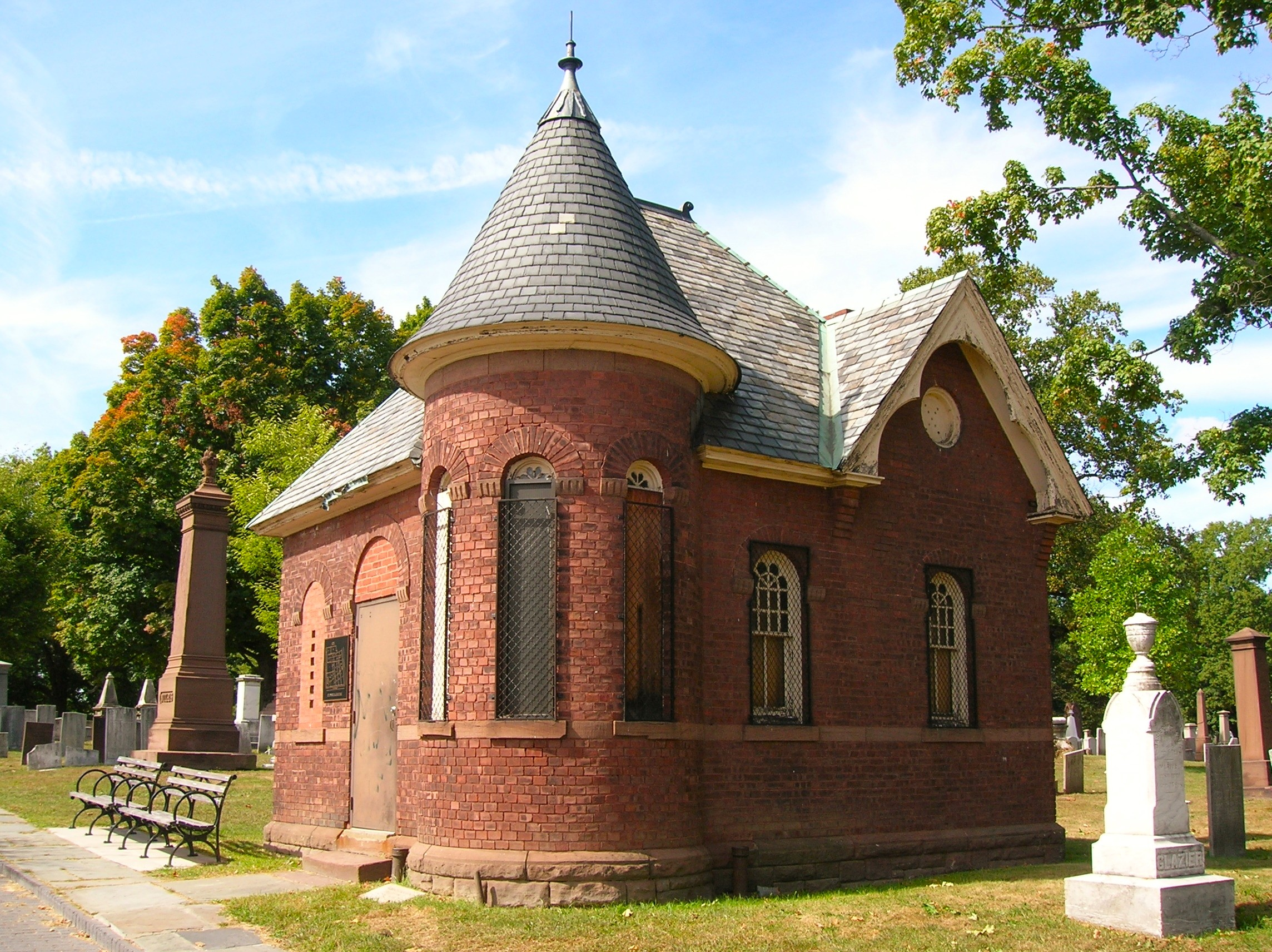
- Old office building near entrance

- Location within Connecticut Location within the United States
- Location: 1821 Main Street, Hartford, Connecticut
- Coordinates: 41°46′48″N 72°40′42″W
- Area: 17 acres (6.9 ha)
- Built: 1807
- Architect: Batterson, James G.
- Architectural style: Queen Anne
- NRHP reference No.: 98000964
- Added to NRHP: August 6, 1998

The Old North Cemetery is a cemetery on Main Street in the Clay-Arsenal Neighborhood North of Downtown Hartford, Connecticut. It was established in 1807, and was the city's second municipal cemetery. It was the principal burying ground for the city's elites for many years, and has a fine collection of 19th-century funerary art. It was listed on the National Register of Historic Places in 1998. Although burials continue to take place there occasionally, they only take place on existing plots.

== Description and history ==
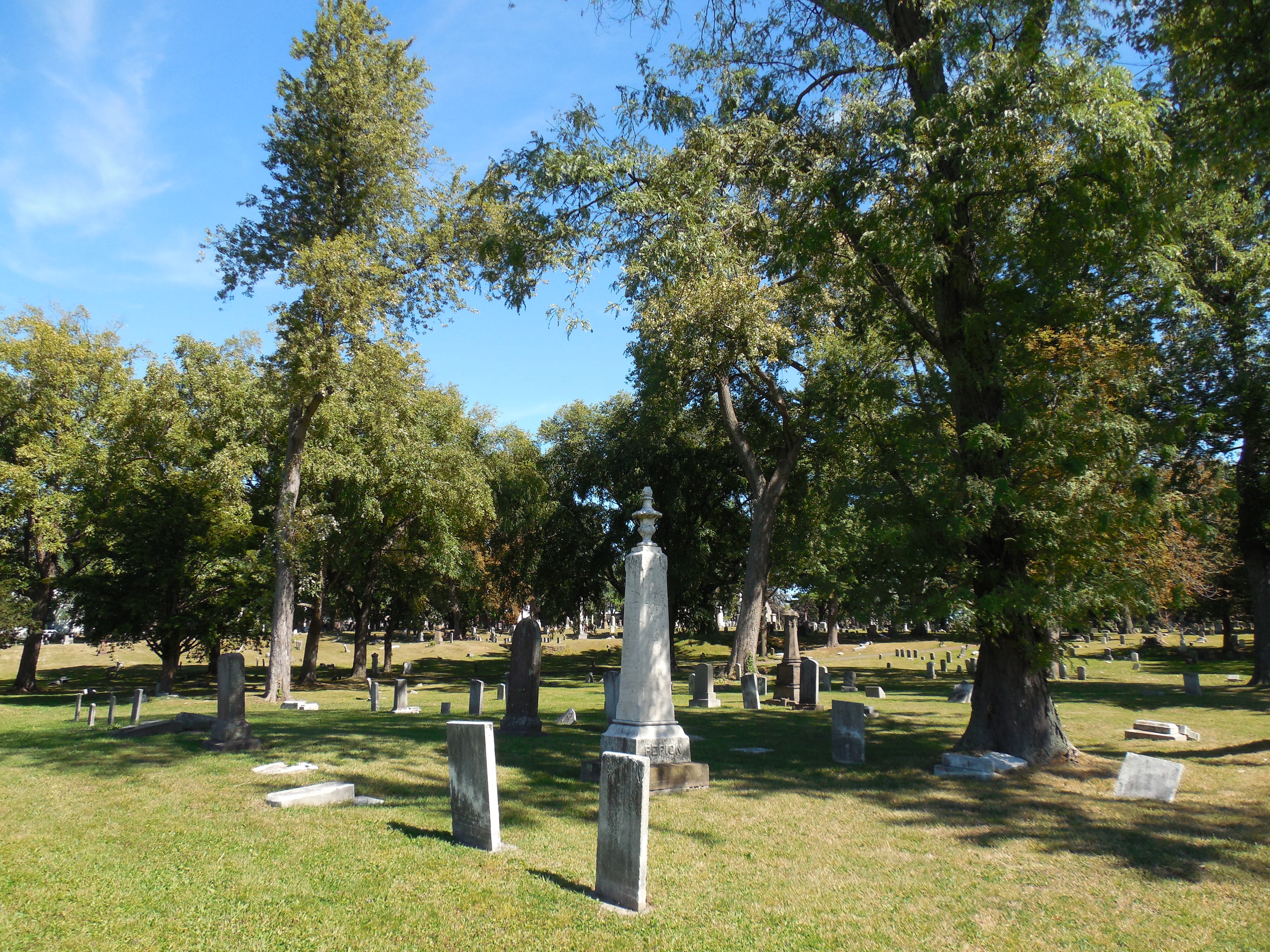

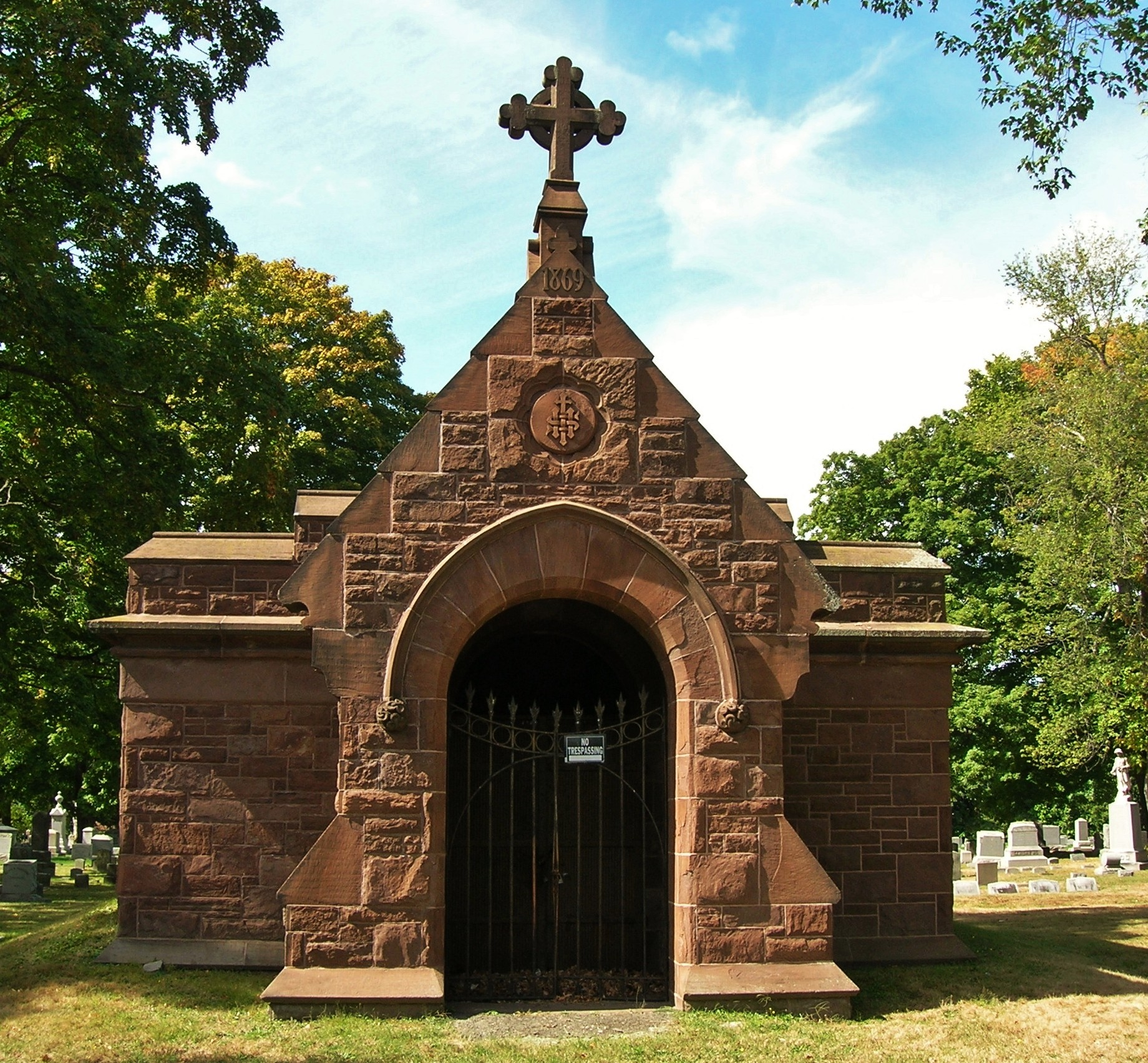

Hartford's first cemetery, the Ancient Burying Ground, was established in 1640. By the early 19th century it was filling up, so the city purchased 11 acres (4.5 ha) of land north of the downtown from farmer Hezekiah Bull for the creation of this cemetery. This purchase was incremented by others in the 19th century, until the cemetery reached its present size of 17 acres (6.9 ha). Significant burial plots in the cemetery include this of the Colt and Goodwin families, both prominent in the civic and business leadership of the city. The Weld Monument is a memorial to two brothers, Charles and Lewis Weld, who were soldiers in the American Civil War; Lewis in particular is noted for his leadership of the 41st United States Colored Infantry. A number of the monuments were prepared by the stone cutting firm of James G. Batterson, who is best known for supplying stone for the Connecticut State Capitol.

The cemetery is located on the west side of Main Street, and is roughly rectangular in shape, except for a cutout where the Union Baptist Church is located. Its Main Street boundary is lined by a metal picket fence, with the main entrance marked by a pair of brick piers. Adjacent to the entrance is a small brick office, a Queen Anne style structure with a combination of Renaissance and Classical Revival styles. These elements were probably added around 1890. A series of roadways provide a roughly rectangular circulation pattern through the cemetery grounds. The northwestern section of the grounds contain concentrated groups of Jewish and Italian graves.

== See also ==
- National Register of Historic Places listings in Hartford, Connecticut
