= Arthur N. Holcombe =

American political scientist

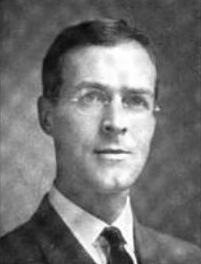
- Born: Arthur Norman Holcombe; November 3, 1884; Winchester, Massachusetts
- Died: December 9, 1977 (aged 93); Gwynedd, Pennsylvania
- Occupation: Political scientist
- Spouses: Carolyn H. Crossett (m. 1910) Hadassah Moore Leeds Parrot (m. 1964)
- Children: 5

Arthur Norman Holcombe (November 3, 1884 – December 9, 1977) was an American political scientist and educator who taught at Harvard University from 1910 until his retirement in 1955. He was known for his studies of government structure.

== Life ==
Arthur N. Holcombe was born in Winchester, Massachusetts on November 3, 1884. He received a BA at Harvard University in 1906 and a Ph.D. in 1909. On August 30, 1910, he married Carolyn H. Crossett. They had five children. In 1964, he married Hadassah Moore Leeds Parrot.

Holcombe split his career between public service and teaching. He was president of the American Political Science Association in 1936. He was credited with establishing political philosophy and theory as basic disciplines in Harvard University’s government curriculum, where he was Professor of government, from 1910 to 1955. Among his students were John F. Kennedy, Henry Kissinger and Henry Cabot Lodge.

In 1949, he assisted Chiang Kai-shek in the drafting of a constitution for the Republic of China. In 1955, he retired as Eaton Professor of the Sciences of Government to become chairman of the committee to Study the Organization of Peace, an affiliate of the American Association for the United Nations.

Holcombe died in Gwynedd, Pennsylvania on December 9, 1977.

== Works ==
- Holcombe, Arthur N. (1919). State Government in the United States. The Macmillan Company. "Arthur N Holcombe."
- Holcombe, Arthur N. (1930). The Spirit of the Chinese Revolution. New York: Alfred Knopf. ISBN 978-1-4437-8540-2.
- Holcombe, Arthur Norman (1930). The Chinese Revolution: A Phase in the Regeneration of a World Power. Cambridge, MA: Harvard University Press.
- Arthur N. Holcombe, The Middle Classes in American Politics (Cambridge, Mass: Harvard University Press, 1940). Reprinted: de Gruyter.
- Human Rights in the Modern World. New York University Press. 1948.
- Our More Perfect Union: From Eighteenth-Century Principles to Twentieth-Century Practice. Harvard University Press. 1950. ISBN 978-0-674-64650-6.
- A strategy of peace in a changing world. Cambridge, Massachusetts: Harvard University Press. 1967.
