= Mary Seymour Howell =

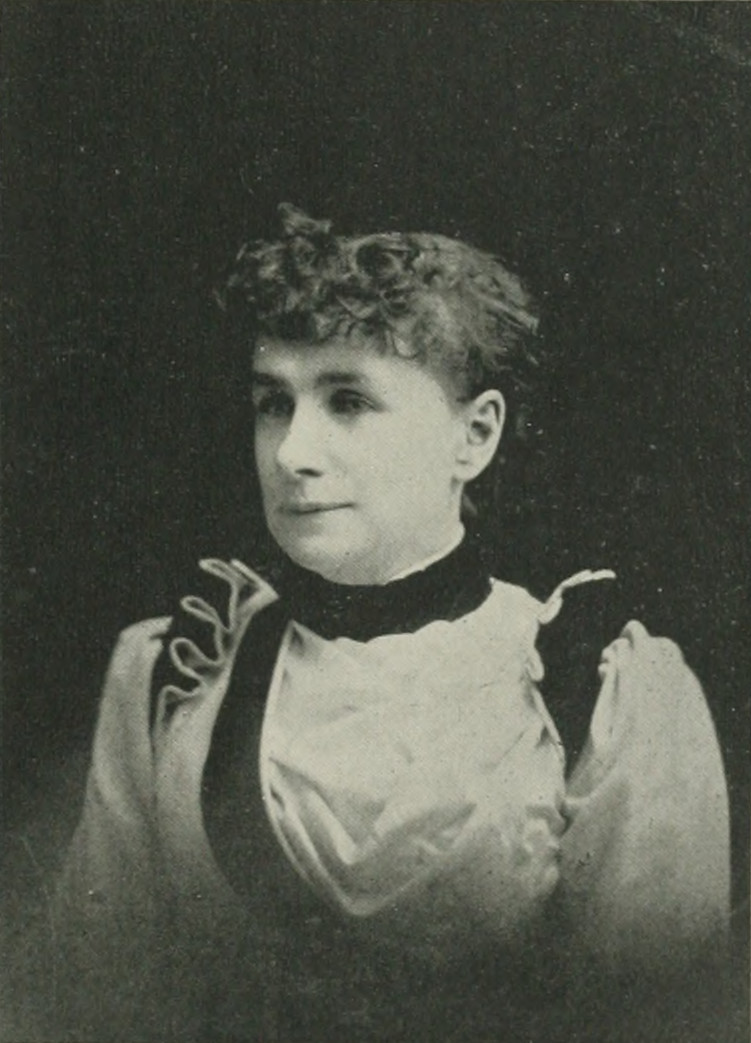
Mary Catherine Seymour Howell, "A woman of the century"

Mary Catherine Seymour Howell (August 29, 1844 – February 18, 1913) was a leader, lecturer, and activist for women's suffrage in the United States. She authored the bill granting women the right to vote in New York State that passed in 1892. She was a very magnetic orator, her addresses enlivened with anecdotes, and through them all ran a vein of sentiment. Her speeches were received with enthusiasm, and the press spoke of her in terms of highest praise.

== Early years and education ==
Mary Seymour Howell was born in Mount Morris, New York, August 29, 1844. She was the only daughter of Norman and Frances Metcalf Seymour, who were prominent members of the local community. She was a lineal descendant of the Seymour family, well known in English history through the Puritan representative, Richard Seymour, who settled in Hartford, Connecticut, in 1639.

She received a classical education, attending local schools in Mt. Morris before graduating from the Genesee Wesleyan Seminary in Lima, New York.

== Career ==
She devoted much time to the higher education of New York State and did much work for the cause of temperance. In 1883, she became interested in securing suffrage for women. Howell is best known for her oratory abilities. Under the care of lecture bureaus, she delivered many historical and literary lectures, addressing audiences in many of the cities and villages of the North and West, as well as in New England and her own State.

She repeatedly plead the cause of women before committees of State legislatures and of Congress. Howell was the first woman who ever asked to speak before the Connecticut House of Representatives. In 1890, she delivered the address to the graduating class of South Dakota College. In the 1890s, she spoke in Kansas and the Dakotas with her colleague, the national suffrage advocate Susan B. Anthony, who was from Rochester, New York. She was appointed in 1891, by Elizabeth Cady Stanton, the president of the National American Woman Suffrage Association, to represent that body in the National Council of Women of the United States in Washington, D.C. Howell and Anthony made a tour of New York State in 1894, presenting the state constitutional convention with a "monster suffrage petition." She was also a national lecturer for the Women's Christian Temperance Union (W.C.T.U.).

== Personal life ==
In 1869, she was married to George Rogers Howell from Long Island. He was employed at the New York State Library, serving as the State Librarian for a time, and died in 1889 at Albany, where they resided. Howell's only child, Seymour Howell, died a junior in Harvard University, March 9, 1891.

She died on February 18, 1913, at her hometown of Mt. Morris and is buried at the Mt. Morris Cemetery.

=== Apparition ===
The American Society for Psychical Research (1913) published this "ACCOUNT OF AN APPARITION WHICH APPEARED TO MARY SEYMOUR HOWELL IN 1871":—

In the year 1865 I had a lover by the name of John A. Broadhead. Owing to several circumstances I was obliged to give him up although I was deeply attached to him. When he found that he could not marry me he left the town of Mount Morris, where I lived, but before he went he said to me. " Mary I think this separation will kill me but if I die and a spirit can come back to earth I will come to you." I replied "Oh, no, don't, for that would frighten me dreadfully." "No it would not," he answered, " for I should come so calmly that you would not be at all afraid ".

In 1868, I married George R. Howell, a presbyterian minister who knew all about my affection for John Broadhead. In April. 1871, I was visiting my old home with my husband and baby boy. About one o'clock one Sunday afternoon (I think it was April 12th.) I sat in the parlor of my father's house, my baby in my arms, on the long old fashioned sofa on which I had so often sat with my old lover. My husband sat across the room with his back to me. reading. The sofa was unusually long and I sat at the end of it near a door opening into the hall.

Suddenly, I felt a pressure against my knee and limb as though some one had come very close to me and I looked up expecting to see one of my brothers but to my great surprise I saw my old lover, John Broadhead, standing there beside me. I felt greatly distressed for he lived in a distant city. I had not seen him since 1865, and I thought it an unwarrantable intrusion that he should enter my father's house thus unannounced. It never occurred to me that he was not alive. I noticed every detail of his dress and can even now distinctly remember the black and white necktie which he wore. Before I had a chance to speak he raised his right hand and said, speaking very slowly and gently, " Be very calm, Mary. I am what they call dead. I died in the west three weeks ago to-day." Then lifting his left hand he pointed to a newspaper which lay at the other end of the sofa about three feet away from me, and said "You will find my death in that paper." Then without moving a muscle he vanished while I gazed at him.

I was not at all afraid, but felt completely overcome by the shock of suddenly learning that he was dead for much as I loved my husband, I had never gotten over my old feeling for John Broadhead; and if it had not been for the baby in my arms I think I should have fainted away. As it was, I could not speak or call my husband, but I managed to hitch along the sofa till I could reach the paper to which he had pointed. This turned out to be a copy of the New York Times that had never been taken out of the wrapper in which it had come through the mails.' I tore it open and there, among the death notices I found this paragraph:— "Died in Burlington, Iowa, March 22nd, 1871, John A. Broadhead of this city in the 34th year of his age."

I cannot be perfectly sure that the paper was a New York Times and I do not know its exact date but I am certain that it was a New York paper and I think it was the Times. I do not know how the paper came to be there at all as we did not take the New York Times but there had been a convention of ministers in the village and several of them had been stationed at my father's house. The paper may have been sent to one of them.

John Broadhead was a lawyer and a conservative Episcopalian. He was not a spiritualist, nor was I. I saw John Broadhead with my eyes as I would see any living person but I did not hear what he said as I hear ordinary speech. The words were perfectly distinct but I seemed to sense them bv what I can perhaps best describe as a sort of inner hearing.
