= Emily Parmely Collins =

American woman suffragist and writer (1814–1909)

Emily Parmely Peltier Collins
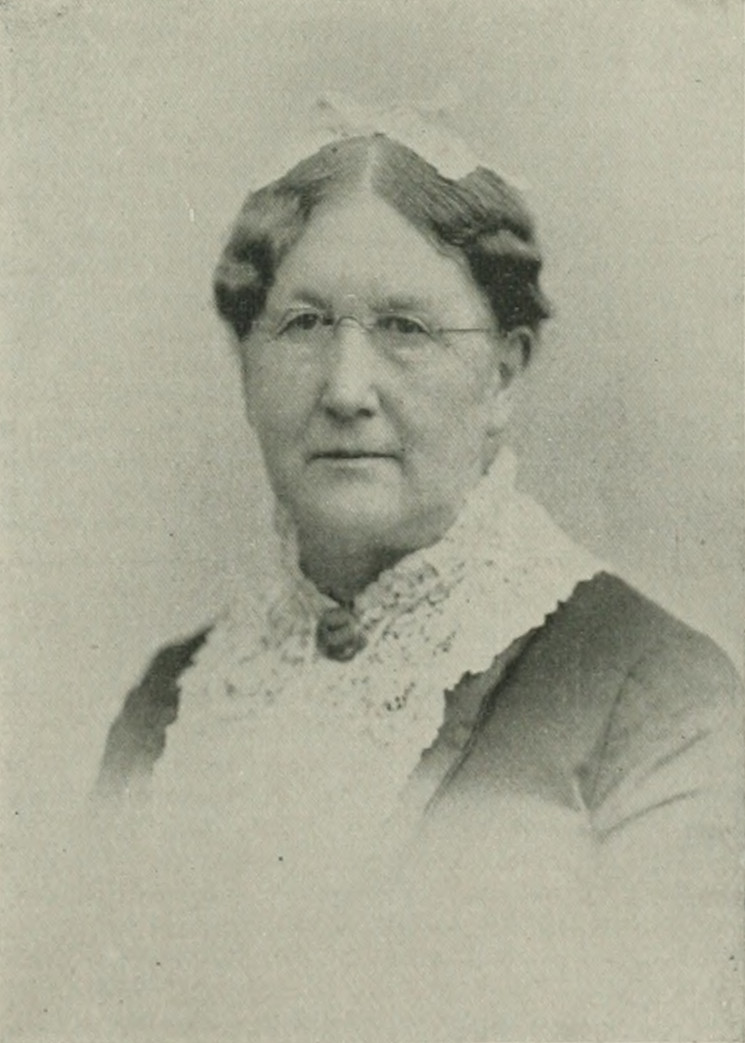
- Photo in A Woman of the Century
- Born: Emily Parmely; August 11, 1814; Bristol, New York, U.S.
- Died: April 14, 1909 (aged 94); Quincy, Massachusetts, U.S.
- Resting place: Cedar Hill Cemetery, Hartford, Connecticut, U.S.
- Occupations: suffragist; activist; writer
- Spouses: Charles Peltier (m. 1835, died); Simri Bradley Collins (m. 1841; died 1878)
- Children: 2 sons
- Writing career
- Pen name: "Justitia"
- Language: English

Emily Parmely Collins (née, Parmely; after first marriage, Peltier; after second marriage, Collins; pen name, Justitia; August 11, 1814 – April 14, 1909) was an American woman suffragist, women's rights activist, and writer of the long nineteenth century. She was the first woman in the United States to establish a society focused on woman suffrage and women's rights, in South Bristol, New York, in 1848. She was an early participant in the abolitionism movement, the temperance movement as well as a pioneer in the women's suffrage movement in the United States. She believed that the full development of a woman's capacities to be of supreme importance to the well-being of humanity; and advocated through the press for woman's educational, industrial and political rights. Collins died in 1909.

== Early life ==
Emily Parmely was born in Bristol, New York, on August 11, 1814, to James Parmely and Lydia Robbins Donelson who were early settlers of the "Genesee Country". Her ancestors on her father's side came from Kent County England and settled in Guilford, Connecticut, in 1639. Her father fought during the Revolutionary War in the 9th Connecticut Regiment.

As a child Emily Parmely was sensitive and shy, preferring to be alone with her pets and books. Early on, she became an industrious reader, especially of history and poetry.

== Career ==
=== Pre-war ===
At age 16, Collins became a teacher of district number 11 in Burbee Hollow, Bristol, New York. She received a salary equal to male teachers, which was considered unusual at the time.

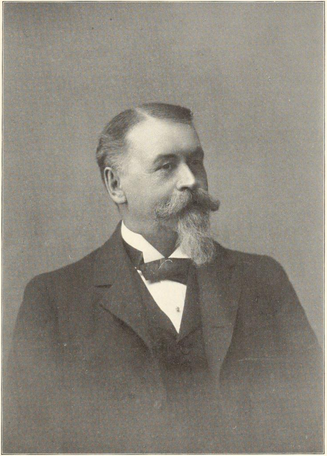
Pierre Desnoyers Peltier (son)

In 1832, she removed to Michigan with a brother where she taught in a log schoolhouse in the vicinity of Port Huron. On January 8, 1835, she married Charles Peltier, a merchant. They soon went to Detroit to live. Charles served as Post Trader at Fort Gratiot, and afterward Comptroller and Justice of the peace in Detroit, holding office through several administrations. They had one son, Pierre Desnoyers Peltier, M.D. (1835–1906). Charles died in Detroit.

Her second husband was Simri Bradley Collins (1800–1878), whom she married July 4, 1841. Simri was the son of Rev. Naron Coobe Collins, D. D., formerly of Connecticut, later of East Bloomfield, New York. They had one son, Emmett Burke Collins (1842–1872).

In 1848, she returned to Bristol, New York. She attended the Seneca Falls Convention in July. On October 19, she organized the first woman suffrage society in the world: the Woman's Equal Rights Union (alternately called the Equal Suffrage Society or the Equal Rights Association). In the same year, she sent the first petition to the legislature. In 1858, the family removed to Rochester, New York, remaining until 1869. Here, she was a member of the Unitarian church.

=== Civil War ===
"All through the Anti-slavery struggle, every word of denunciation of the wrongs of the southern slave, was, I felt, equally applicable to the wrongs of my own sex. Every argument for the emancipation of the colored man, was equally one for that of woman; and I was surprised that all Abolitionists did not see the similarity in the condition of the two classes."

Collins was a volunteer nurse in Virginia. Her two sons, one a surgeon, the other a lawyer who had just been admitted to the bar, accompanying her. She wrote:— "I served as a volunteer nurse through the campaign of 1864 at the front in the Shenandoah Valley, with both of my sons, Dr. P. D. Peltier and Captain E. Burke Collins.

=== Louisiana ===
In 1869, the family removed to Tangipahoa Parish, Louisiana, where Collins buried her second husband in 1876. Her second son, Captain E. Burke Collins, died in 1872. She was a resident of Louisiana for ten years. With Elizabeth Lisle Saxon, she continued her suffragist work.

In 1879, as a new State constitution was being framed, a paper from Collins, giving her ideas of what a just constitution should be, was read to the delegates and elicited praise from the New Orleans press.

=== Connecticut ===
In the same year, having leased her plantation, she removed to Hartford, Connecticut, to live with her son, Pierre. In 1885, with Frances Ellen Burr and others, she organized the Hartford Equal Rights Club, and was for many years its president, and later its honorary president.

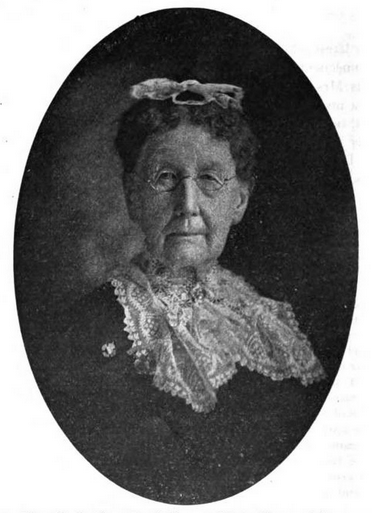
Collins, age 90

She wrote occasional stories, to illustrate some principle, for the Pacific Rural and other journals. Not ambitious to acquire a literary reputation, and shrinking from publicity, she seldom appended her name. For several years, she wrote each week for the Hartford Journal, under the pen-name "Justitia", a column or two in support of human rights, especially the rights of woman. She also urged the same before each legislature of Connecticut. As a solution of the temperance issue, she advocated in the Hartford Examiner the exclusive manufacture and sale of liquor at cost by the government. She also urged a change from the electoral system to that of proportional representation, and industrial cooperation in place of competition.

== Personal life ==
Collins was a member of the Massachusetts Referendum League and of the Woman's Relief Corps. She spoke year after year before the legislature in support of the petition for woman suffrage, and addressed many audiences on various subjects. She became a member of the Daughters of the American Revolution, Hannah Woodruff Chapter, of Southington, Connecticut, in October 1904. Her national number was 48316, and hers was the one hundredth name on the membership roll of "Real Daughters" in Connecticut.

She died on April 14, 1909, and was buried at Cedar Hill Cemetery, Hartford, Connecticut. In addition to her sons, she had three grandchildren and four great-grandchildren.
