= Emily Pierson =

American suffragist (1881–1971)

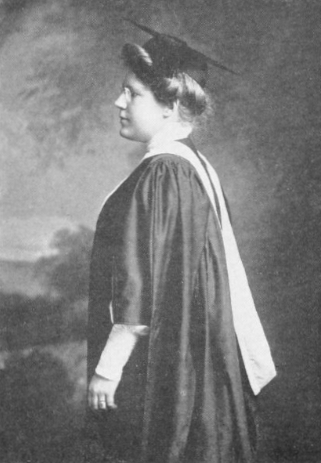
Pierson in a 1915 publication

Emily Pierson (1881 – January 21, 1971) was an American suffragist and physician. Early in her career, Pierson worked as a teacher, and then later, as an organizer for the Connecticut Woman Suffrage Association (CWSA). After women earned the right to vote, she went back to school to become a physician in her hometown of Cromwell, Connecticut. During much of her life, she was interested in socialism, studying and observing in both Russia and China.

== Biography ==
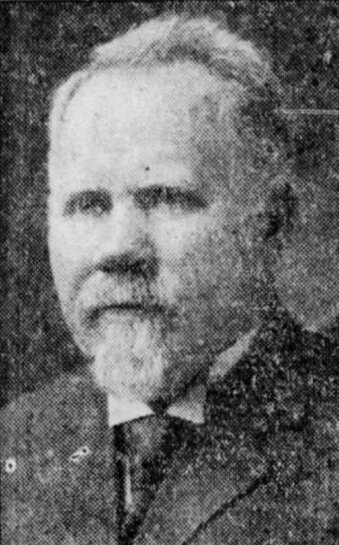
Portrait of Andrew N. Pierson

Emily Pierson was born in Cromwell, Connecticut in 1881. Her father, Andrew Nils Pierson, a horticulturalist, was also wealthy and provided his daughter with an excellent education. Her brother was Wallace R. Pierson. The family business, growing roses, was once one of the largest in the country. Emily Pierson earned her bachelor's degree in 1907 from Vassar College and her master's degree from Columbia College the next year. Pierson went on to teach high school in Bristol, Connecticut.

Pierson joined the Connecticut Woman Suffrage Association (CWSA) sometime around 1909 and 1910. She worked as a state organizer for CWSA and was involved in giving speeches and coordinating the 1912 Trolley campaign for women's suffrage. She served as the head marshal of the nationwide suffrage march on May 2, 1914. In 1917, she testified in front of the Connecticut House judiciary committee on women's suffrage. When Rhode Island allowed women to vote for president in the next national election, Pierson toyed with the idea of moving there temporarily just so that she could be allowed to vote.

In 1921, Pierson attended Yale School of Medicine and earned her medical degree in 1924 as the only woman in her class. She went on to work as the director of health in Cromwell and as a school physician for around 30 years. Pierson was politically progressive and supported socialism. In the 1930s, she studied for a time at the Institute of Socialism in Moscow. She went back to visit hospitals in Russia and shared her experiences of the country with people in Connecticut. She also traveled to China, going along as a guest of Anna Louise Strong. During a 1935 strike of Colt Firearms workers, Pierson walked the picket line with workers. In August 1955, Pierson resigned as the Cromwell Health Officer.

Pierson died in the Meadowbrook Convalescent Home in Cromwell on January 21, 1971. In 2020, she was inducted into the Connecticut Women's Hall of Fame. A memorial plaque in honor of Pierson was erected in Cromwell in 2021.
