= Frances Ellen Burr =

- Born: June 4, 1831; Hartford, Connecticut
- Died: February 9, 1923 (aged 91); Hartford, Connecticut, U.S.

Signature
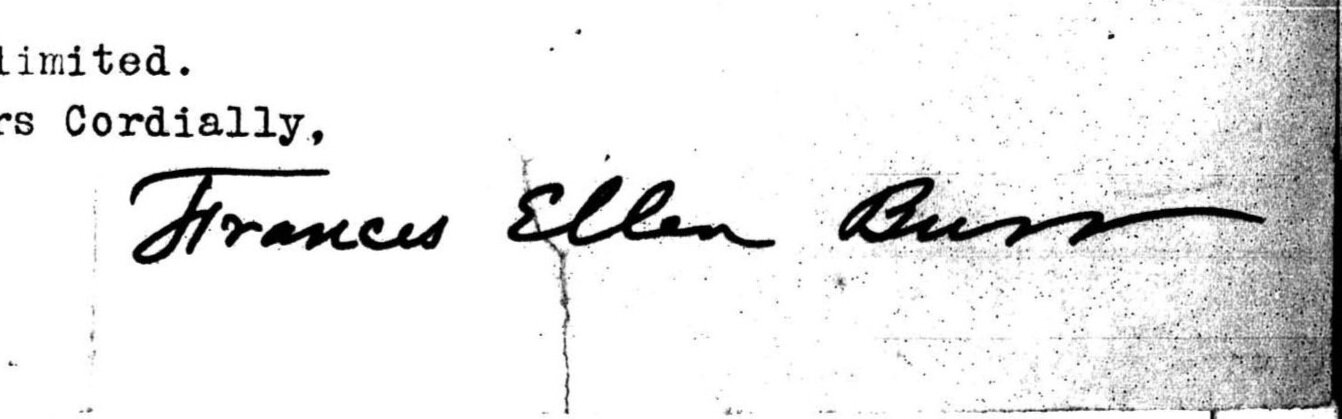

Frances Ellen Burr (June 4, 1831 - February 9, 1923) was an American suffragist and writer from Connecticut. In 1869, she was a co-founder of the Connecticut Woman Suffrage Association.

== Early life ==
Burr was born on June 4, 1831, in Hartford, Connecticut, and was the youngest of fourteen children born to James Burr and Lucretia Olcott Burr. Her brother Alfred E. Burr was publisher of the progressive newspaper, the Hartford Times.

== Suffrage work ==
Burr attended the 4th National Women's Rights Convention held in Cleveland in 1853. After getting enough petitions, she introduced a suffrage bill in the Connecticut General Assembly in 1867 that was defeated by a fairly narrow vote, giving her hope for women's suffrage in the state. In 1869, she was one of several suffragists to call for the first suffrage convention held in Connecticut. At the convention, she and Isabella Beecher Hooker founded the Connecticut Woman Suffrage Association (CWSA). Over the next 41 years, Burr would serve as the recording secretary of CWSA. She was also active in suffrage work on the national level.

Later, Burr and Emily Parmely Collins started the Hartford Equal Rights League in 1885. Burr was a contributor to The Woman's Bible, and one of eight women who wrote "special commentaries" for the book.

== Personal life ==
Unlike many feminist activists of her generation, Burr lived to see women's suffrage won in 1920, when she was in her late eighties. She died in her Hartford home on February 9, 1923, at the age of 91. Her body was placed in a vault in Spring Grove Cemetery. In 2020, she was inducted into the Connecticut Women's Hall of Fame in 2020.
