= St. John The Baptist School (Alden, New York) =

Coordinates: 42°54′41″N 78°31′25.5″W

St. John The Baptist School is a Catholic School in Alden (town), Erie County, New York, just outside Buffalo, New York. They are overseen by the Roman Catholic Diocese of Buffalo and Bishop Edward U. Kmiec. St. John the Baptist enrolls students in grades K-8, plus Pre K for children of ages 3 and 4.

== History and information ==
St. John the Baptist was founded in 1853. The school serves multiple school districts including Clarence, Akron, Attica, East Aurora, Iroquois, Pembroke, Lancaster, Alexander, Depew and Maryvale. The Alden school district provides free transportation for students that live within 15 miles of the school.

=== Sports ===
St. John's offers boys and girls soccer, track, girls cheerleading, basketball, volleyball, and softball.

=== Academics ===
Subjects taught at St. John's include:
• Religious studies
• Reading
• Language Arts
• Mathematics
• Science
• Social Studies
• Health
• Handwriting
• Critical thinking skills
• Study and research skills
• Comprehensive literature study: Grades 6 - 8
• Emphasis on writing skills at all grade levels.
• Library skills - Grades K - 8
• Spanish: Enrichment - Grades K - 5. Multiple days in Grades 6- 8.
• Technology Education and Computer literacy: Grades K - 8
• Physical Education twice per week: Pre-K 4- 8
• Art: Pre-K 4 - 8
• Music: Pre-K 4 - 8

== Community involvement and activities ==
St. John’s recently participated in the Buffalo Niagara Earth Day Celebration: Paint the Rain Green Competition. St. John the Baptist School in Alden was accepted for a Buffalo Niagara RIVERKEEPER rain barrel.

The school also shows films, performances and welcomes live speakers. On April 12, 2010 biblical actor Frank Runyeon presented his programs “Sermon on the Mount” and “Hollywood vs. Faith.”

They also hold an annual cemetery clean up that gets many volunteers from the community.

In 2008, St. John's ranked 32nd out of 289 on Business First of Buffalo's "Top Elementary Schools" list.
