= Katharine Ludington =

American suffragist (1869–1953)

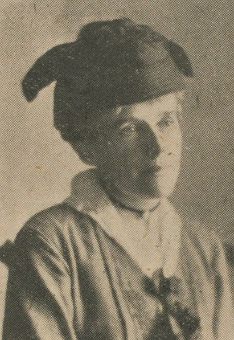
- Katharine Ludington, from a 1916 publication.
- Born: October 16, 1869; New York City, US
- Died: February 9, 1953 (aged 83); Old Lyme, Connecticut, US
- Occupation: Suffragist

Katharine Ludington (October 16, 1869 – March 9, 1953) was an American suffragist. She was the last president of the Connecticut Woman Suffrage Association, and a founding leader of the League of Women Voters.

== Early life ==
Ludington was born in New York City, one of the seven children of Charles Henry Ludington (1825–1910) and Josephine Lord Noyes Ludington (1839–1908). Her mother was part of the prominent Noyes family. Her father was a banker and a member of the prominent Ludington family of New York and New England. Revolutionary War colonel Henry Ludington was her great-grandfather, and Sybil Ludington was her great-aunt. The library in Old Lyme, Connecticut, is named for her maternal grandmother, Phoebe Griffin Noyes.

Ludington was educated at Miss Porter's School, and studied painting with portrait artist Montague Flagg at the Art Students League in New York City.

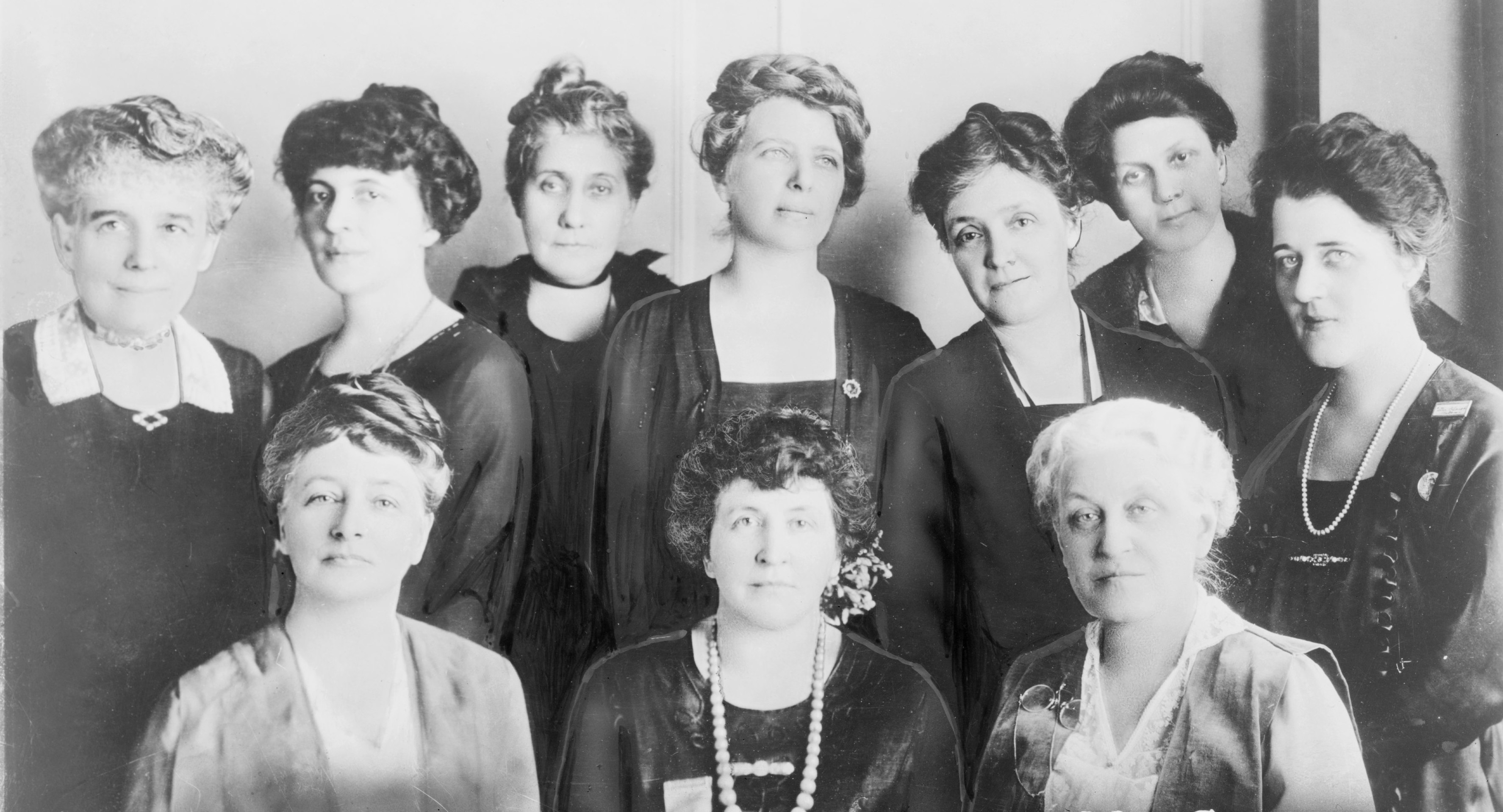
Board of Directors, National League of Women Voters, Chicago Convention, February 1920; Ludington is standing at the far left of the photo. Others in the photograph include Maud Wood Park, Grace Wilbur Trout, and Carrie Chapman Catt.

== Career ==
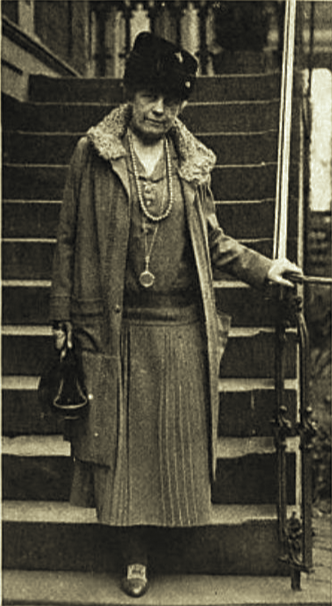
Ludington, in 1927, as first vice-president, National LWV, on the steps of the Washington headquarters

Ludington was a founding member of the Old Lyme Equal Suffrage League in 1914, and president of the Connecticut Woman Suffrage Association from 1918 until it disbanded in 1921, succeeding Katharine Houghton Hepburn. In 1917 she spoke at a suffrage event in Washington, D.C. She created a library of women's works at the Old Lyme Inn, and held a suffrage study group in her home. Despite her vigorous efforts, Connecticut did not ratify the Nineteenth Amendment until after it became part of the United States Constitution in 1920.

Ludington helped to form and lead the Connecticut League of Women Voters. She continued to be active in civic leadership, and in 1922 became the first New England director of the League of Women Voters (LWV). She was also head of the LWV's financial committee on the national level, and president of the Connecticut Women's Suffrage Association. She actively supported the establishment of the United Nations. She published a pamphlet, "The Connecticut Idea" (1919), and a family history, Lyme — And Our Family (1928).

== Personal life ==
Ludington died in 1953, aged 83 years, at her home in Old Lyme, Connecticut. She was survived by her younger sister, suffragist Helen Ludington Rotch. Some of her papers are in the Connecticut Woman Suffrage Movement Collection at Western Connecticut State University. Her name is on a plaque honoring Connecticut's suffrage leaders, located in the south corner of the Connecticut State Capitol building.

Businessman Charles Townsend Ludington and art collector Wright S. Ludington were her nephews. American Studies professor C. Townsend Ludington is her great-nephew.
