= John Hooker (abolitionist) =

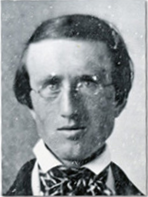
John Hooker

John Hooker (1816–1901) was an American lawyer, judge, and abolitionist as well as a reformer for women's rights. He married Isabella Beecher Hooker in 1841 and lived in Farmington and Hartford, Connecticut.

With his brother-in-law, Francis Gillette, he purchased 140 acres in 1853, and they established the Hartford neighborhood known as "Nook Farm." It was a community of reformers, politicians, writers and friends; Harriet Beecher Stowe, Mark Twain, and Charles Dudley Warner, in addition to Gillette and John and Isabella Hooker, were the most famous residents.

== Life and career ==
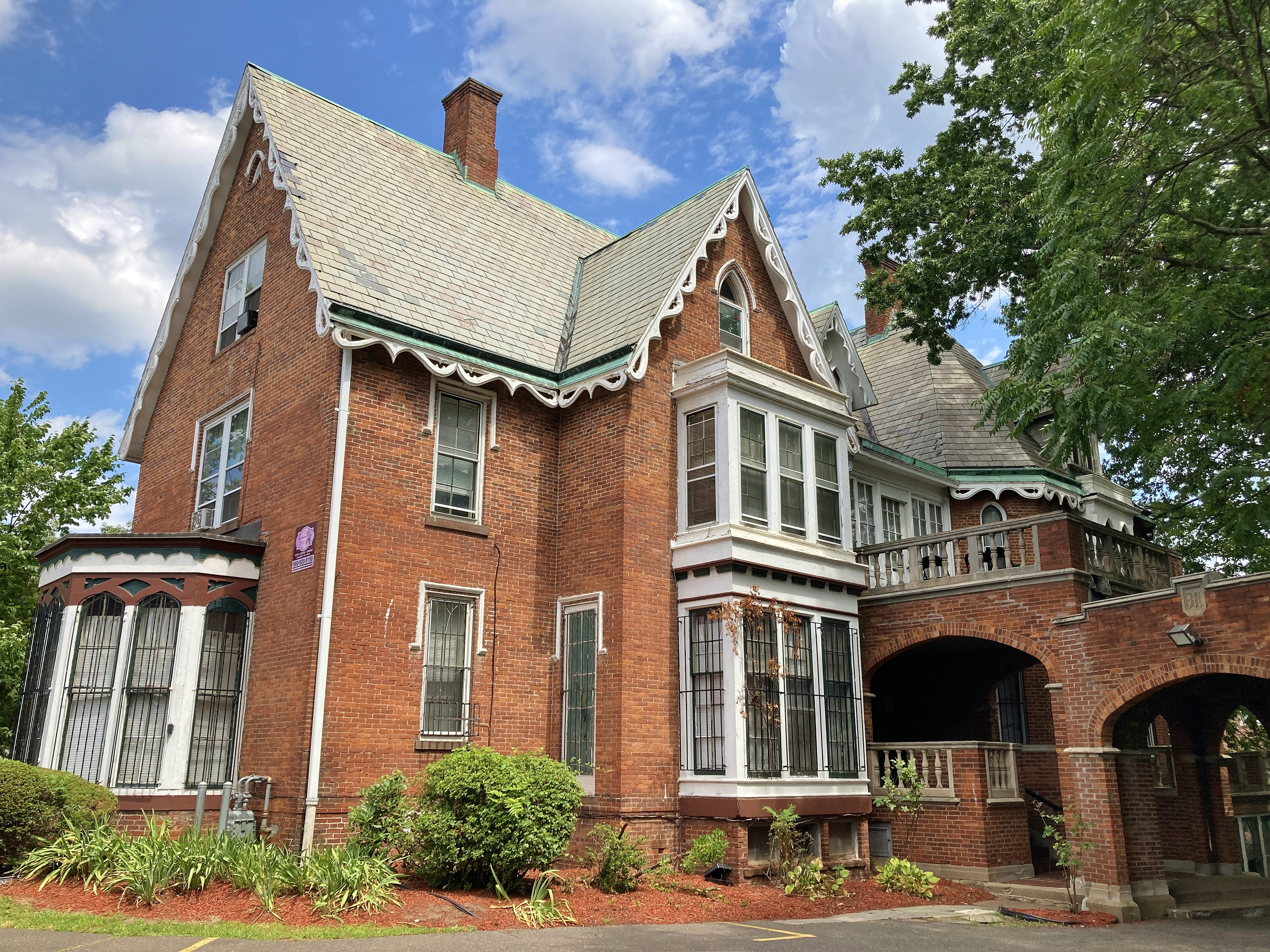
Hartford, Connecticut home of John and Isabella Hooker. (August 2022)

In John Hooker's memoir Some Reminiscences of a Long Life, he mentioned that he was the son of Edward Hooker, who was the fifth in direct descent from Thomas Hooker, the first minister of the First Church of Hartford and the founder of Connecticut. John Hooker also experienced the Amistad case first hand in Farmington. His law office was on the second floor of Samuel Deming's store in the 1840s. The office was also next to a room used by Amistad captives. The building was originally on Main Street next to Deming's house, and moved to Mill Lane in the 1930s.

John and Isabella Beecher Hooker raised three children in their home in Nook Farm at the corner of Forest and Hawthorn streets. Under his wife's influence, he was an advocate in the women's rights movement and supported his sister-in-law, Harriet Beecher Stowe, during the initiation of her activist career.

An active abolitionist throughout his legal career, Hooker was instrumental in helping an African-American minister, Reverend James W.C. Pennington, gain his freedom from his Maryland slave owner for $150, when the owner discovered that Pennington was preaching at the Talcott Street Congregational Church in Hartford. This financial arrangement helped Pennington feel safe in the North and he returned from Europe, where he had fled, to continue his career as a minister. Hooker was also the president of an anti-slavery committee in Hartford and organized the Liberty Convention on October 27, 1846.

Hooker served as a Congregational deacon and also accepted the beliefs of the Spiritualism movement, whose members thought it was possible to communicate with spirits of the dead.

== Charter Oak Newspaper (1838) ==
Charter Oak was an anti-slavery newspaper published by Hooker and the Connecticut Anti-Slavery Society of Hartford. The newspaper's masthead carried the motto "Free Principles–Free Men–Free Speech–And A Free Press." Digital copies can be found at the Connecticut State Library's Newspapers of Connecticut collection.

== Married Women's Property Act ==
John and Isabella Beecher Hooker wrote "A Woman's Property Bill", which became the Married Women's Property Act, a Connecticut state law enacted in 1877. It contributed to the women's rights movement and aimed to give women more "power" within the family. The act states: "This legislation enables a married woman to control her own property and to sue and to be sued in the same manner as her husband."

Party political offices
| Preceded by Francis Gillette | Free Soil nominee for Governor of Connecticut; 1854 | Succeeded by None |
