= Connecticut Woman Suffrage Association =

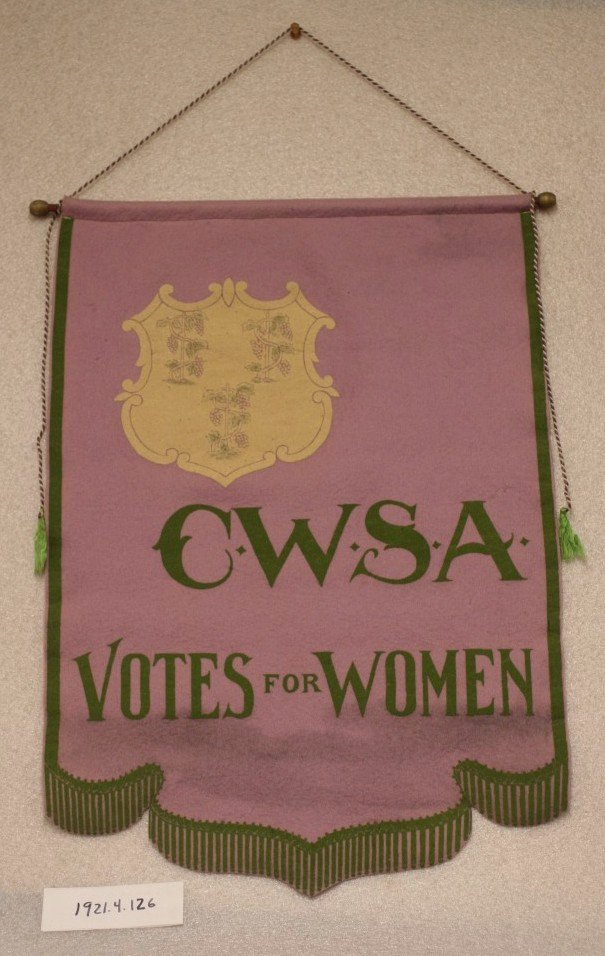
Connecticut Woman Suffrage Association, "Votes for Women" banner.

The Connecticut Woman Suffrage Association (CWSA) was founded on October 28, 1869, by Isabella Beecher Hooker and Frances Ellen Burr at Connecticut's first suffrage convention. Its main goal was to persuade the Connecticut General Assembly to ratify the 19th amendment, giving women in Connecticut the right to vote. Throughout its 52 years of existence, the CWSA helped to pass local legislation and participated in the national fight for women's suffrage. It cooperated with the National Women's Suffrage Association through national protests and demonstrations. As well as advocating for women's suffrage, this association was active in promoting labor regulations, debating social issues, and fighting political corruption.

== Overview ==
The Connecticut Woman Suffrage Association was first formed on October 28, 1869, in hopes of gaining women's voting rights in Connecticut. Members of the CWSA argued that they needed the right to vote to protect personal property, influence labor conditions, and to protect their children. The first meeting was held in Roberts Opera House in Hartford, Connecticut. The CWSA started small, focusing on campaigning for women's suffrage on the local level. As it gained momentum, this group became influential in the fight for women's suffrage in Connecticut and nationally. However, it was unable to push Connecticut to ratify the 19th amendment, allowing Tennessee to be the 36th and final state to make women's right to vote law.

Smaller groups like the CWSA were vital to the women's suffrage movement nationally as well as locally. The CWSA collaborated with groups like the National Women's Suffrage Association to coordinate larger events, as well as local ones. One local event, a month-long automobile tour, was a successful campaign to gain the support of Litchfield citizens, who at the time, were primarily against women's suffrage. This campaign was held in August 1911, and it gained 964 signatures on a petition for women's suffrage.

=== Activities ===
The CWSA created local events and activities that helped the movement for women's suffrage grow in Connecticut. These activities included:

- Publishing papers
- Holding rallies
- Petitioning government officials
- Proposing bills
- Organizing demonstrations
- Speaking at legislative hearings
- Writing to political leaders
- Signing pledges
- Holding demonstrations
- Participating in national demonstrations
- Hosting mailing campaigns

== History ==
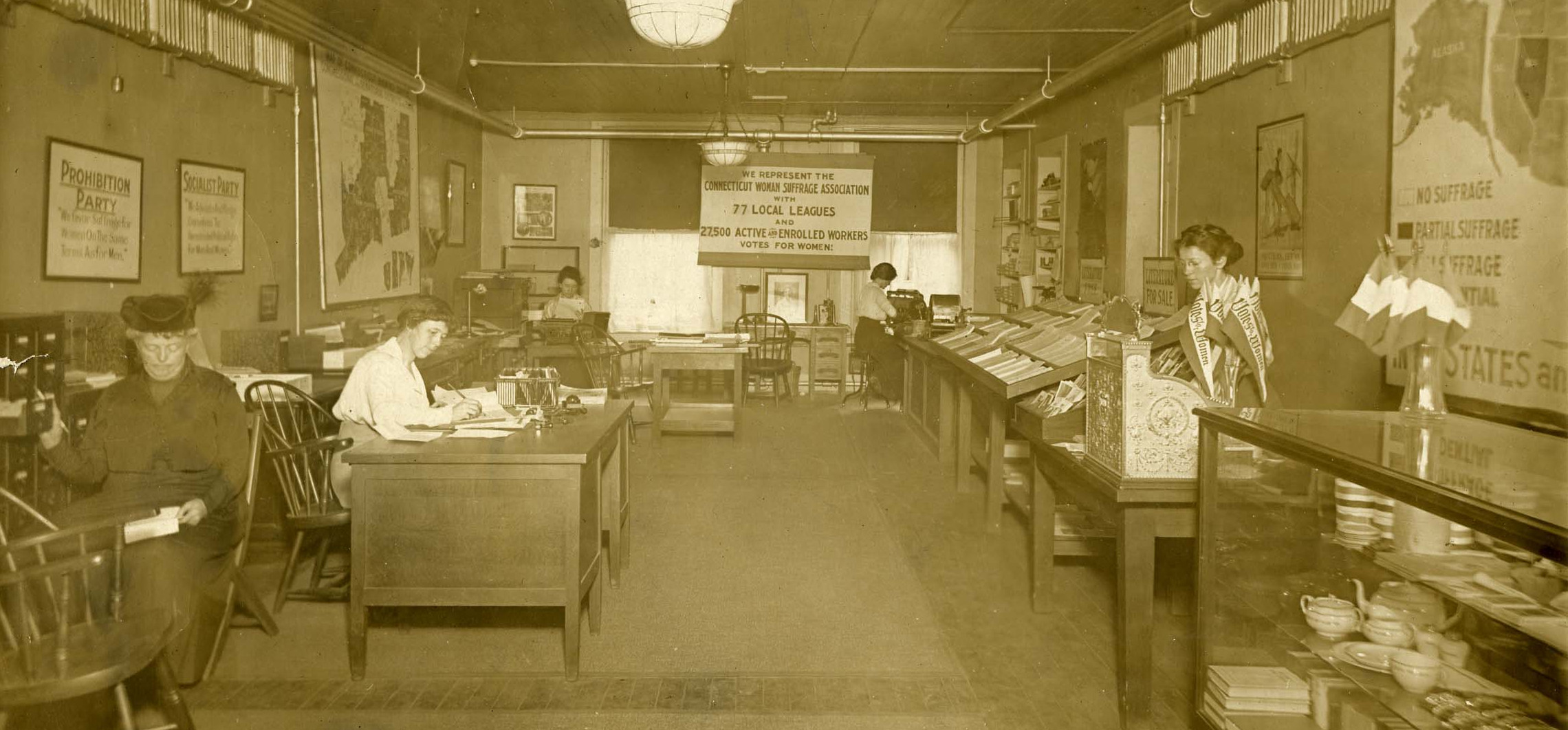
Connecticut Woman Suffrage Association headquarters

Isabella Beecher Hooker and Frances Ellen Burr were co-founders of the CWSA, starting the group after a women's suffrage convention held in Hartford, Connecticut, in 1869. The first president was Reverend Nathaniel J. Burton who held the position until 1871. After Burton, Isabella Hooker led the CWSA for 36 years, until stepping down in 1905. During years with Isabella Beecher Hooker as director, the CWSA helped to pass local legislation that improved women's rights in Connecticut. In 1887, the CWSA's influence helped the passage of the Married Women's Property Bill. Later, it also helped women in CT gain the right to vote for school officials in 1893, and to vote on library issues in 1909.

In the early 1900s, after Isabella Beecher Hooker stepped down, support for the women's movement waned and the CWSA dropped to only 50 members in 1906. Elizabeth D. Bacon, who had served as vice president, and did much of the work for Hooker in later years, became president of CWSA in 1906.

Katharine Martha Houghton Hepburn, brought a new energy to the movement when she took over as president of CWSA in 1910 after a two hour long discussion and a vote of 40 to 12. She took more aggressive actions like organizing rallies and holding demonstrations. On May 2, 1914, the CWSA led the first suffrage parade in Connecticut. Over 2,000 people attended. Through Hepburn's efforts and the revitalization of the women's rights movement, the CWSA reached over 32,000 members in 1917. With the support of its new members, the CWSA wrote a telegram directly to President Woodrow Wilson on July 12, 1918. The pressure from Connecticut and other states eventually led to Woodrow Wilson's change in opinion about women's voting rights.

As support for the suffrage movement grew, other women's rights groups also formed in Connecticut, including The Connecticut League of Women Voters. These organizations collaborated on events and were instrumental on the eventual passage of the 19th amendment. However, as support for women's suffrage grew, opposition to women's voting rights also increased in Connecticut. Two of Connecticut’s senators voted against the amendment. There was also a countermovement led by The Connecticut Association Opposed to Woman Suffrage.

Although there was opposition to women's right to vote, on May 21, 1919, the Nineteenth Amendment was passed, and later ratified on August 18, 1920. After accomplishing this goal, the CWSA voted to disband on June 3, 1921.

=== Leadership ===
Director	Years
Nathaniel J. Burton	1869-1871
Isabella Beecher Hooker	1871-1905
Elizabeth Bacon	1906-1910
Katharine Martha Houghton Hepburn	1910-1917
Katharine Ludington	1918-1921

=== Notable members ===
- Olympia Brown.
- John Hooker.
- Emily Pierson.
- Emma Winner Rogers.
- Caroline Ruutz-Rees.
- Grace Thompson Seton.
- Harriet Beecher Stowe.

== See also ==
- Women's suffrage in states of the United States

== Bibliography ==
- Anthony, Susan B. (1902). Anthony, Susan B.; Harper, Ida Husted (eds.). The History of Woman Suffrage. Vol. 4. Indianapolis: The Hollenbeck Press.
- Anthony, Susan B.; Gage, Matilda Joslyn; Harper, Ida Husted; Stanton, Elizabeth Cady (1985). "Connecticut". In Husted Harper, Ida (ed.). History Of Woman Suffrage Vol. 6. New York: Arno & The New York Times. pp. 68–85. OCLC 153585569.
- Cohn, Henry S.; Schulz, Michael (August 2021). "John Hooker, Reporter of Judicial Decisions". Connecticut Law Review. 53 (2): 295–334 – via EBSCOhost.
- Florey, Ken. "Paper and Pamphlets". Woman Suffrage Memorabilia. Archived from the original on October 4, 2017.
- Harper, Ida Husted (1922). The History of Woman Suffrage. New York: J.J. Little & Ives Company.
- Nichols, Carole Artigiani (1979). A New Force in Politics: The Suffragists' Experience in Connecticut (MA in Women's History thesis). Sarah Lawrence College.
- Nichols, Carole (1983). Votes and More for Women: Suffrage and After in Connecticut. New York: The Haworth Press, Inc. ISBN 0866561927 – via Internet Archive.
- Lampos, Jim; Pearson, Michaelle. "LOOKING BACK: Legacy of Katharine Ludington, and that of her grand home". ShoreLineTimes News and Views of the Valley & Shore. ShoreLineTimes.
- Lampos, Jim; Pearson, Michaelle (May 4, 2015). Remarkable Women of Old Lyme. OCLC 947153735.
- Russell, Whitney C. "Women's Political Rights in Connecticut 1830 - 1980". Yale-New Haven Teachers Institute. Yale-New Haven Teachers Institute 2016.
- "Notes for the August 26th Anniversary of Woman Suffrage Victory". Connecticut Digital Newspaper Project. December 19, 2014.
