= Pierson =

Pierson or Piersons may refer to:

== Places ==
- Pierson, Florida
- Pierson, Iowa
- Pierson, Manitoba
- Pierson, Michigan
- Pierson College of Yale University
- Pierson Creek, a stream in Iowa
- Piersons Lake, a lake in Minnesota
- Pierson Township, Vigo County, Indiana
- Pierson Township, Michigan, in Montcalm County

== Other uses ==
- Pierson (surname)

== See also ==
- Peirson, given name and surname
- Pearson (disambiguation)
