= Anne Elizabeth McDowell =

Anne Elizabeth McDowell (June 23, 1826 – September 30, 1901) was the first American woman to edit and run a weekly newspaper composed and published solely by women. The Woman's Advocate, which started in 1855, was not the first newspaper run by women. However, unlike other newspapers such as The Lily and The Una, the Woman's Advocate was "produced exclusively by the joint-stock capital, energies, and industry of females." (Women's Advocate, Jan. 5, 1856).

== Early life ==
McDowell was born in Smyrna, Delaware. She was the daughter of William McDowell and Mary (Bassett) McDowell. Her father died when she was three years old in 1829. She was the only girl and the eldest of two brothers and one half brother from her mother's second marriage to George W. Pickering. Anne moved from Delaware to Philadelphia when she was still a child. Little is known about her early life, beyond that she used to attend Sunday school at St. Paul's Protestant Episcopal Church.

== Women's Advocate ==
The Women's Advocate was a weekly newspaper in Philadelphia started in January 1855 and was published until approximately 1860. The paper was run completely by women, which means that from the articles in the front page up until the copy editing was all produced only by female employees. There were other papers run by women at that time, however, the Advocate was the only and first one to hire only females. The style of the newspaper was similar to mid-nineteenth-century women's magazines such as Ros Ballaster. Margaret Beetham. Elizabeth Frazer and Sandra Hebron magazines.

The content of the paper did not focus on the claim for political rights of women, but instead the claim for commitment to literature, general news, scientific improvements and inventions and hopefully a family paper.

McDowell was a feminist and shared the idea of a workplace where women did not “clamor for the political rights of woman” but instead would focus in the use of her rights as women to make a life as she wrote in the paper on Jan. 12, 1856.

Lydia Jane Wheeler Peirson and Mary Vaughn were editors and contributors, and many others notable at that time such as Elizabeth Cady Stanton, Jane Swisshelm, Susan B. Anthony, and Pauline Wright Davis supported the paper and recommended it as a source for women's rights.

- The paper was a heavy financial drain and eventually McDowell was forced to go out of business.
- The price of the paper was two dollars in that period of time.

== Later career ==
After the Women's Advocate she became the editor of the woman's department of the Philadelphia Sunday Dispatch from 1860 until 1871. Eleven years later she was at the same post at the Philadelphia Sunday Republic.

Later in her life, she established the McDowell Free Library for the women who worked at Wanamaker's department store. The store's owner, John Wanamaker, wrote a letter for McDowell on her birthday offering her the opportunity to set up a library for the women employees at the store, which was called the McDowell Free Library. The library was designated for the convenience of the women folks who he considered to be also great readers. "In honors of a woman who has spent her life as a worker for women."

According to Wanamaker, McDowell was able to put the library into operation as quickly as possible. She was also able to make the rules and select the books available in the library.

== Death ==
McDowell died at the age of 75 years in 1901. She was paralyzed in one leg from an illness and died of paralysis. She was buried in Arlington Cemetery, Drexel Hill, Pa.
