= Senator Pierson =

Senator Pierson may refer to:

- Akilah Weber Pierson (born 1978), California State Senate
- Arthur N. Pierson (1867–1957), New Jersey State Senate
- Henry R. Pierson (1819–1890), New York State Senate
- Wallace R. Pierson (died 1946), Connecticut State Senate
