= Peirsol =

Peirsol is a surname. Notable people with the surname include:

- Aaron Peirsol (born 1983), American competitive swimmer
- Hayley Peirsol (born 1985), American competitive swimmer

== See also ==
- Peirson
