= Josiah Belden =

American politician

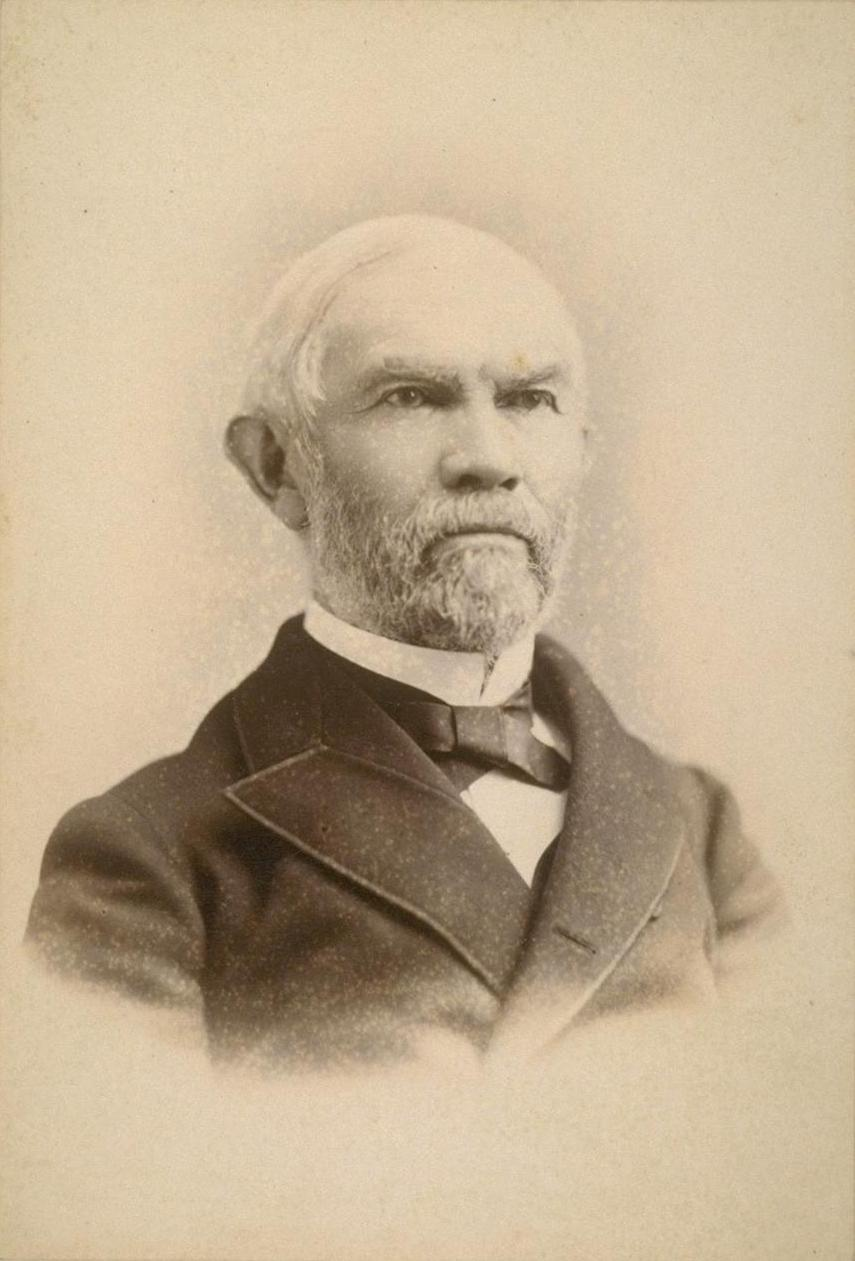
Josiah Belden

Josiah Belden (May 4, 1815 – April 23, 1892), known in Spanish as Josías Belden, was a Californian politician and trader. He was born in Connecticut, eventually emigrating to Alta California (then part of Mexico). In California, he became a Mexican citizen, a prominent trader, and a rancho grantee.

== Life ==
Born in the Upper Houses in Connecticut, Belden was orphaned by the time he was 14. He later moved to St. Louis, Missouri and became a successful businessman. In 1841 he joined the Bartleson-Bidwell Party, the first organized emigrant party to use the California Trail to reach the Mexican province of Alta California. The party was detained at Mission San Jose by General Mariano Guadalupe Vallejo for illegally entering Mexico without valid passports; Vallejo violated his orders to force all American immigrants to leave California, allowing the group to remain after becoming Mexican citizens.

He came in 1842 to Monterey, where Thomas O. Larkin put him in a mercantile store at Santa Cruz and made him his agent. Belden was living in Branciforte (now Santa Cruz), when the USS United States, under the command of Commodore Thomas ap Catesby Jones, captured the nearby Presidio of Monterey on October 20, 1842. Jones appointed Belden alcalde, a political position that combines the functions of a mayor, a judge, and a sheriff. On October 21, Jones discovered that the U.S. and Mexico were not at war, and returned the Presidio back to the Mexican forces; Belden's short term as alcalde also ended.

Belden received the Rancho Barranca Colorado Mexican land grant near Red Bluff in current Tehama County in 1844. In 1846, Belden gave William B. Ide 50 percent ownership of the grant, in exchange for Ide operating the ranch. Belden sold the Ide family the entire rancho in 1849.

In 1848, Belden opened a store in San Jose. After San Jose became the first incorporated city in California, Belden was elected its first mayor on April 8, 1850. He served a single one-year term and was elected to serve as a member of the city's Common Council for a one-year term in 1851. His 11-acre mansion later became the Vendome Hotel.

Belden's letters and journal were published in 1962 as Josiah Belden, 1841 California Pioneer: His Memoir and Early Letters. His grandson, Charles Josiah Belden, was a well-known western photographer. His daughter, Mary Elizabeth, married Capt. Luis F. Emilio, 54th Ma. Infantry.

Political offices
| Preceded by John C. Conroy as First Alcalde | Mayor of San Jose; 1850–1851 | Succeeded by Thomas White |
