= Latimer House (North Carolina) =

Museum in Wilmington, North Carolina, US

Zebulon Latimer House
- Interactive map of Zebulon Latimer House
- 34.2332°N 77.9461°W
- Location: 126 South Third Street; Wilmington, North Carolina, U.S.

History
- Built: 1852
- Built by: Robert B. Wood and John C. Wood

Site notes
- Architect: James F. Post
- Architectural style: Italianate
- Current use: Museum
- Owner: Lower Cape Fear Historical Society
- Website: Latimer House Museum and Gardens

The Latimer House, located at 126 South Third Street in Wilmington, North Carolina, United States, is a historic house museum built in 1852.

== Background ==
The house was built for Zebulon Latimer, born in Cromwell, Connecticut, in 1810. He was part of the Latimer family a respected family in New England

The commercial culture of Connecticut exposed Latimer in his early years to shipping, merchandising, credit and the expanding trade between the northern ports and the American South. Latimer left Connecticut for Wilmington, North Carolina, because it was the largest port on the East Coast of the United States.

== History ==
The house was built in 1852 by brothers Robert B. and John C. Woods and the carpentry work was done by James F. Post, The house was built for the Latimer family. It was designed in the then-popular Italianate architectural style of the era and contained 14 rooms. Each floor was made identically.

The property remained in the Latimer family until 1962, when it was acquired by the Lower Cape Fear Historical Society in 1963 to serve as its headquarters.
