= Piersol =

Piersol is a surname. Notable people with the surname include:

- John Piersol McCaskey (1837–1934), American educator and politician
- Lawrence L. Piersol (born 1940), American judge

== See also ==
- Pierson (surname)
