= Chad Ripperger =

American traditionalist Catholic priest (born 1964)

The Reverend Father Chad Ripperger
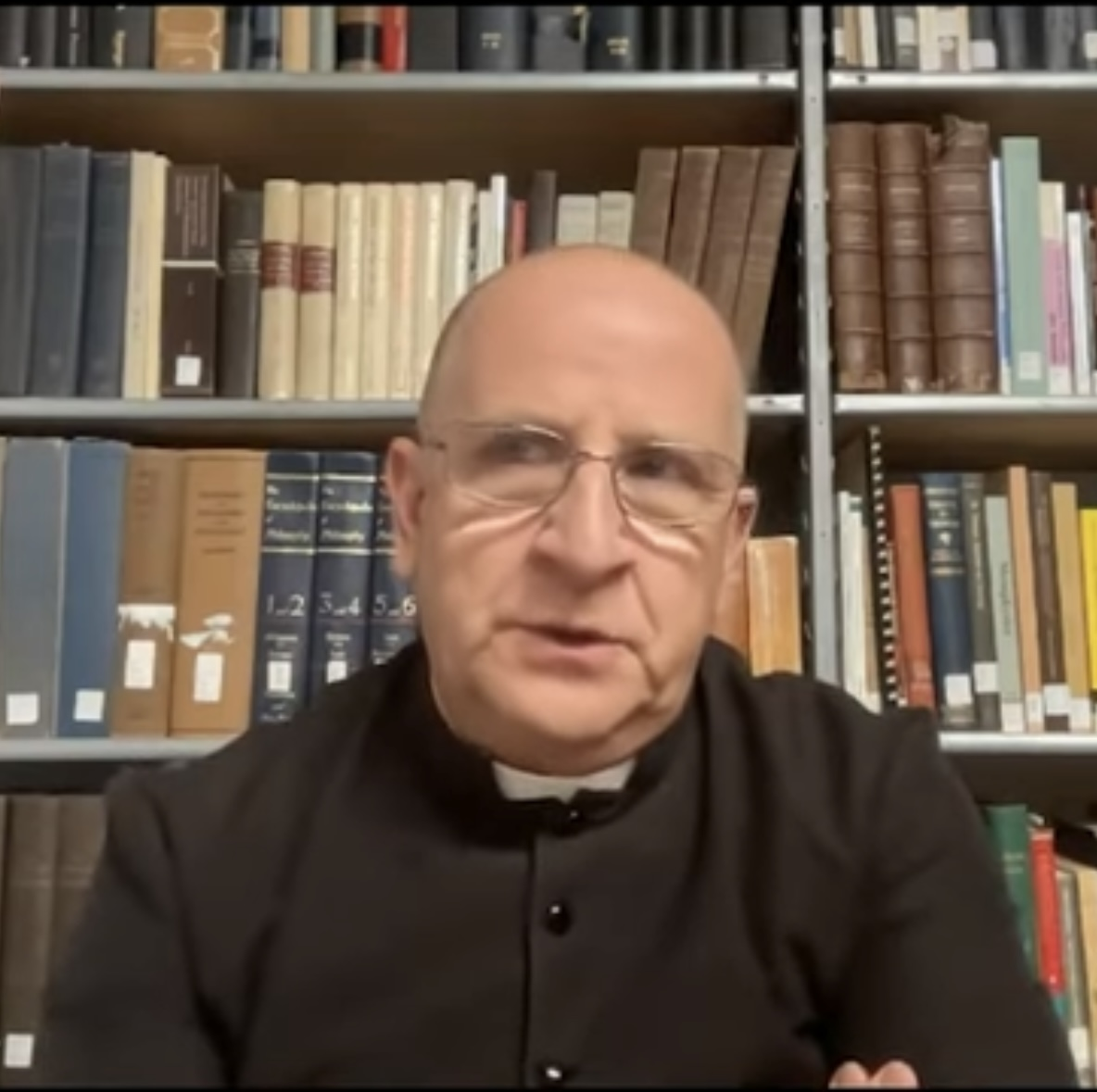
- Ripperger in November 2022
- Archdiocese: Denver

Orders
- Ordination: June 7, 1997 by Edward Slattery

Personal details
- Born: October 11, 1964 (age 62) Casper, Wyoming, U.S.
- Denomination: Catholic Church
- Residence: Keenesburg, Colorado
- Education: University of San Francisco (BA); University of St. Thomas (MA); Holy Apostles College and Seminary; Pontifical University of the Holy Cross (PhD)

Chad Alec Ripperger (born October 11, 1964) is an American Catholic priest, theologian, and exorcist. He founded the Society of the Most Sorrowful Mother, a traditionalist Catholic association in the Archdiocese of Denver, Colorado, United States, known as the Doloran Fathers. Ripperger is noted for his public commentary on metaphysics, the Mass, spiritual warfare, mental health, and prayer, particularly in relation to his work on deliverance ministry. His views have drawn both supporters and critics, with some commentators expressing concern over the controversial nature of his theological and societal claims. In October 2026 Ripperger agreed to a request by the Archbishop of Denver to refrain from public speaking and interviews for one year.

== Early life and education ==
Ripperger was born in Casper, Wyoming. He earned two bachelor's degrees, in theology and philosophy, from the University of San Francisco; and two master's degrees, one in philosophy from the Center for Thomistic Studies of the University of St. Thomas in Houston, Texas, and another in theology from Holy Apostles College and Seminary in Cromwell, Connecticut. He joined the Priestly Fraternity of St. Peter (FSSP), which sent him to Rome to receive his doctorate in philosophy from the Pontifical University of the Holy Cross.

== Priesthood ==
Ripperger was ordained a Catholic priest on June 7, 1997, by Bishop Edward Slattery for the Priestly Fraternity of Saint Peter. His assignments after ordination included the diocesan St. Gregory the Great Seminary in Seward, Nebraska, of the Diocese of Lincoln, Nebraska. He also taught liturgy at Our Lady of Guadalupe Seminary in Denton, Nebraska, and served as a pastor in Coeur d'Alene, Idaho.

In the early 2010s, Bishop Slattery of the Diocese of Tulsa asked Ripperger to consider training exorcists for the diocese; from that, an idea developed to begin a society of exorcists. Ripperger moved into a motherhouse in 2014 and then a celebration for the formal establishment of the Society of the Most Sorrowful Mother (SMSM) was held in March 2015. Members of the Society call themselves "Doloran Fathers" (DF); Ripperger located the headquarters in the city of Keenesburg, Colorado.

On 19 October 2026 Ripperger agreed to a year-long break from public speaking and interviews at the request of the Archbishop of Denver.

== Views and teachings ==
=== Possession and demons ===
In a 2015 interview during his time in the SMSM, Ripperger stated that Hollywood portrayals of possession are "exaggerated and tend toward the sensational" and that actual possession cases were extraordinarily rare; "in some 150 interviews the SMD conducted last year, only three were found to be cases of demonic possession". On the nature of demonic possession, Ripperger notes that while exceedingly rare, true cases involve manifestations outside human capacity, such as speaking unlearned languages or possessing hidden knowledge. He emphasizes the need to reassure the faithful that such diabolical influences are uncommon. In his 2022 theological treatise Dominion: The Nature of Diabolic Warfare, he systematically outlines the spiritual mechanics of demonic activity, positing that demons operate strictly within the bounds permitted by Divine Providence. In 2022, Catholic speaker and author Chris Stefanick interviewed Ripperger, during which he stated that demons are "on a short leash" and "can only do what Christ permits." In 2024, Ripperger spoke at an event at Colorado State University, where he stated that "only 0.5% of the population is possessed" and described demonic influence as occurring through "diabolic oppression, obsession and possession". He argues that God permits demonic activity so that individuals can grow in virtue, but that behaviors such as engaging in premarital sex, watching pornography, or drug use make individuals more susceptible. Regarding the Blessed Virgin Mary, Ripperger frequently highlights her immense power over the demonic. He has recounted a theological discussion with a demon during an exorcism in which the demon corrected his understanding of Mary's life. When Ripperger suggested the Assumption was her moment of greatest glory, the demon clarified three distinct moments:

"Her greatest triumph was her Assumption... her greatest honor is her Coronation... her greatest glory is standing at the foot of the Cross of Her Son in perfect virtue."

=== Harry Potter and magic ===
In 2019, Ripperger advised Catholics to avoid the Harry Potter series. Regarding author J.K. Rowling, he claimed:

"She went to witch school before she wrote the books... some of the spells in the novels are real spells."

He asserted that because the spells appear in Latin, they pose a danger, claiming that a woman in Spain had burned down her house while attempting one. The claim sparked debate among Catholic commentators regarding the line between harmless fiction and the occult, with apologists like Trent Horn questioning the factual basis of his claims regarding Rowling, while others noted that former chief exorcist of Rome Gabriele Amorth held similar views regarding the spiritual dangers of depicting magic positively.

=== Stop the Steal controversy ===
In January 2021, a report circulated that Ripperger had shared a "Prayer of Command" urging Jesus to "banish evil spirits" in an effort to "Stop the Steal." Ripperger later clarified that while he had composed a deliverance prayer, the political group "modified it" and that he "never said to say it to stop the steal." He stated that he had only encouraged people "to say a prayer for the integrity of the election."

=== Mental health and bipolar disorder ===
Ripperger explores the intersection of spiritual and psychological ailments extensively in his 2013 book, Introduction to the Science of Mental Health, where he utilizes traditional Thomistic psychology and Catholic anthropology to evaluate modern psychological practices. However, his specific views on mental illness have prompted debate over his boundary definitions between psychology and the demonic. He stated:

"Bipolar is actually a form of obsession, demonic obsession by the time it gets to the point where it’s diagnosable."

This comment drew criticism for potentially discouraging individuals from seeking medical treatment. Supporters noted that Ripperger qualifies this by explaining that if a condition is psychological, it will "be physiologically based or it will be triggered by certain objects or events," whereas demonic influence "will have no correspondence to anything whatsoever".

=== Biological evolution ===
In contrast with the positions articulated by Pope Pius XII in Humani Generis (1950) and successive popes—who affirmed that evolutionary theory is compatible with Catholic teaching and may point to a divine creator—Ripperger rejects biological evolution. In his 2012 academic text, The Metaphysics of Evolution, Ripperger approaches the topic through a strictly Thomistic philosophical framework. He considers evolutionary development "absurd" and metaphysically improbable, asserting that "one species does not have the existence of the essence in itself... to confer it to another species." In 2025, Ripperger hosted the "Restore Truth Conference" with Hugh Owen and Robert Sungenis aimed at countering "Darwinian evolution and alien deception."
