= Ripperger =

Ripperger is a surname. Notable people with the surname include:

- Chad Ripperger (born 1964), American Catholic theologian and philosopher
- Mark Ripperger (born 1980), American baseball umpire
- Rockwell Ryan Ripperger, singer-songwriter
- Rolf Ripperger (1928–1975), German actor
