= J. & E. Stevens =

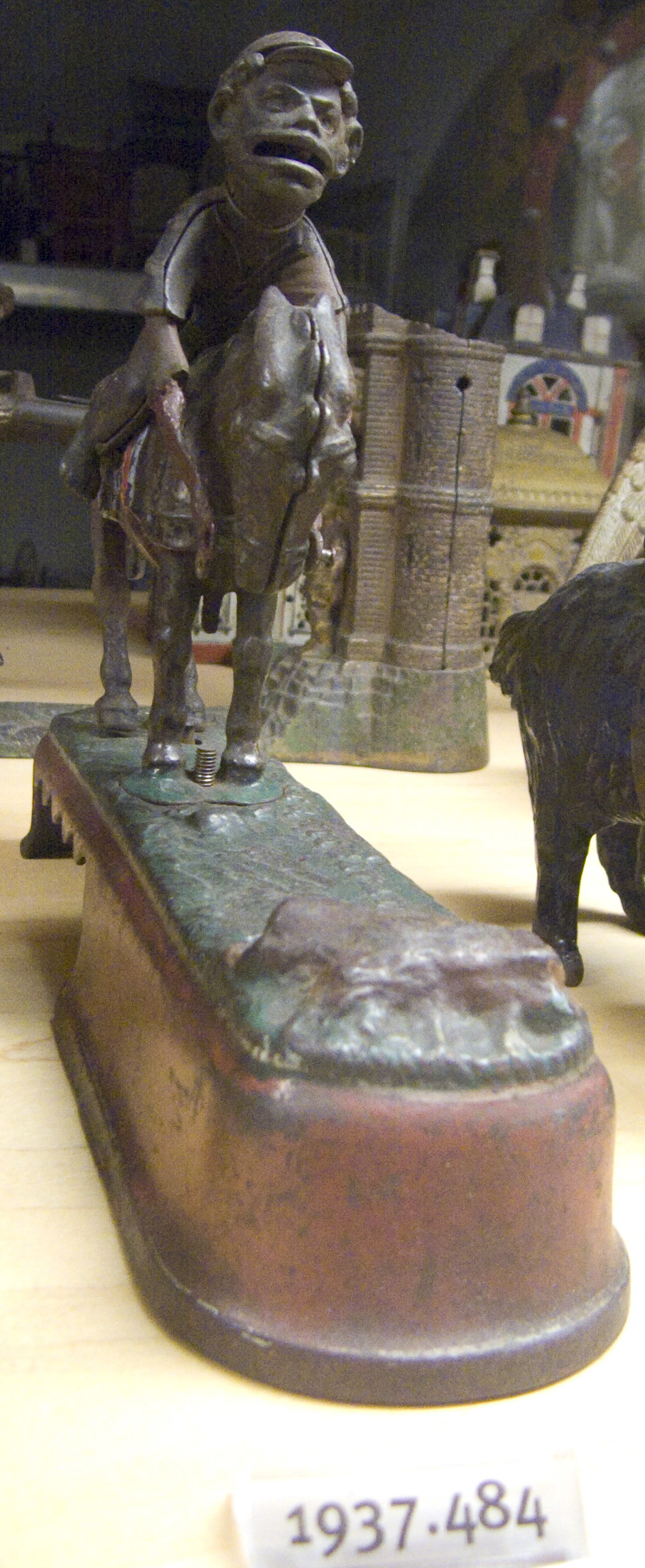
"I always did 'spise a mule" mechanical bank

J. & E. Stevens was a business in Cromwell, Connecticut formed by John and Elisha Stevens in 1843 to make cast-iron hardware, hammers, and iron toys. The success of their toy products, including cap guns, led to a refocus on toys. The company made a wide variety of toys for boys and girls during its more than 100 year history.

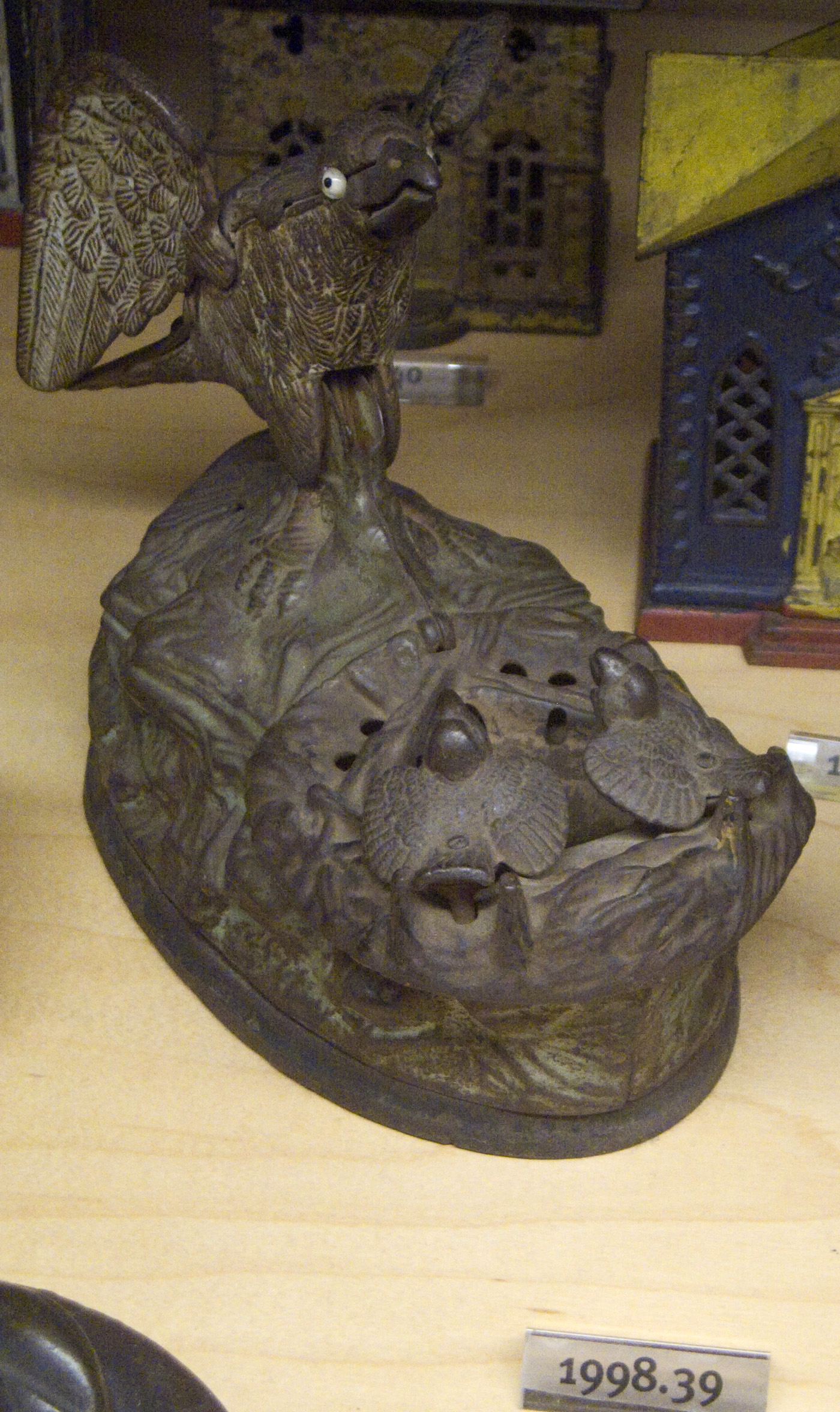
Mechanical bank featuring an eagle and eaglets

The company employed many designers and produced dozens of banks. Their mechanical banks included a "Tammany" bank featuring a heavy-set dressed up politician who puts an introduced coin into his pocket (Tammany Hall). The business was bought out by Buckley Brothers, a New York company, in 1950.

One of their animated banks featuring a hunter and lion appeared on Antiques Roadshow. The University of Connecticut has a collection of the company's papers.
