= Peirson =

Peirson is a given name and surname. Notable people with the name include:

== Given name ==
- Peirson Frank (1881–1951), British civil engineer and surveyor
- Peirson Mitchell Hall (1894–1979), head of the U.S. Selective Service System for Los Angeles in 1941, federal District Court judge 1942–1979
- Henry Peirson Harland (1876–1945), unionist politician in Northern Ireland

== Surname ==
- Francis Peirson (1757–1781), British Army officer who served during the American War of Independence
- Jimmy Peirson (born 1992), Australian cricketer
- Johnny Peirson (1925–2021), Canadian ice hockey player
- Lydia Jane Wheeler Peirson (1802–1862), American poet
- Robert Peirson (1821–1891), English astronomer and theoretical physicist
- Robert Peirson (priest) (died 1805), English priest
- Samuel Peirson (c. 1647 – 1720), English organist

== See also ==
- Pierson (surname)
- Pearson (surname)
- Pirson
