= Pierson (surname) =

Pierson is an English surname, meaning "son of Piers". Notable people with the surname include:

- Abraham Pierson, the elder (died 1678), English pastor in New England
- Abraham Pierson (1646–1707), pastor, and first rector and a founder of what would become Yale University, son of Abraham Pierson, the elder
- Albert H. Pierson (1839–1918), American farmer, teacher, and politician
- Arthur Tappan Pierson, Presbyterian pastor and author
- Christoffel Pierson (1631–1714), Dutch painter
- Clara D. Pierson, American children's book author
- Dax Pierson (1970–2024), American musician
- DC Pierson, American comedian, author, and actor
- Don Pierson, American broadcasting pioneer
- Emma Pierson (born 1981), British actress
- Emily Pierson (1881–1971), American suffragist and physician
- Frank Pierson, American film director
- Henry Hugh Pierson (1815–1873), composer
- Henry R. Pierson (1819–1890), New York politician
- Isaac Pierson (1770–1833), Representative to US Congress from New Jersey
- Jack Pierson (born 1960), American artist and gallerist
- Jean Pierson (1940–2021), French aerospace engineer and executive
- Julia Pierson, the 23rd Director of the U. S. Secret Service
- Kate Pierson (born 1948), American singer, of The B-52's
- Leander J. Pierson, American politician
- Melissa Holbrook Pierson, American author
- Nicolaas Pierson, the 23rd Prime Minister of the Netherlands
- Olive D. Pierson (died 1969), American politician from Connecticut
- Philippe Pierson, Belgian Jesuit
- Rex Pierson, English aircraft designer
- Robert H. Pierson, former president of the General Conference of Seventh-day Adventists
- Wallace R. Pierson (died 1946), American politician from Connecticut
- William Pierson (1926–2004), American actor
- William Pierson Jr. (1911–2008), American painter
- William Pierson (baseball) (1899–1959), American baseball player

== See also ==
- Peirson, given name and surname
- Pearson (surname)
