= Sage-Kirby House =

Historic house in Connecticut, United States

- U.S. National Register of Historic Places
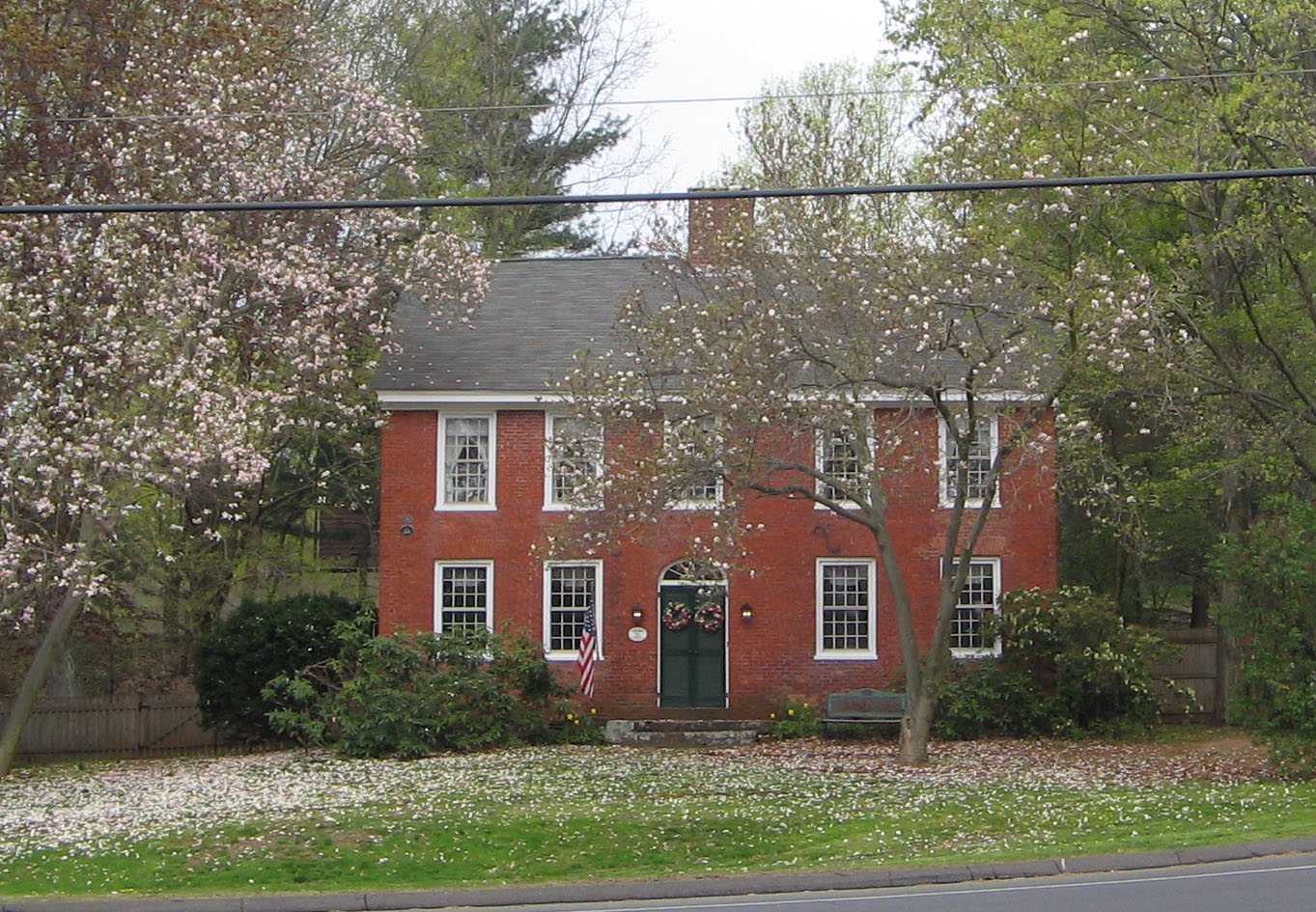
- The Sage-Kirby House
- Location: 93 Shunpike Road, Cromwell, Connecticut
- Coordinates: 41.61136°N 72.67633°W
- Area: less than one acre
- Built: 1815
- Architectural style: Federal
- NRHP reference No.: 82003767
- Added to NRHP: April 29, 1982

The Sage-Kirby House is a historic house at 93 Shunpike Road in Cromwell, Connecticut. Built sometime between 1811 and 1815, it is one of four Federal-period brick houses in the town, and the only one of these with a central chimney. The house was listed on the National Register of Historic Places on April 29, 1982.

== Description and history ==
The Sage-Kirby House is located in a rural-suburban setting of central Cromwell, at the southwest corner of Shunpike Road (Connecticut Route 3) and Evergreen Road. It is a 2 1/2-story brick structure, five bays wide, with a side-gable roof and a large central chimney. Its main entry, centered on the front, has no significant decoration beyond the semi-oval fanlight window above. The interior of the house is timber-framed, with many original finishes and features.

The house, built c. 1811–15, is one of only four surviving brick Federal-style houses in Cromwell, and the only house to retain a central chimney, a late holdover from the colonial era built into this house. It was built for Ebenezer Sage, a descendant of one of Cromwell's early settlers. It was owned for fifteen years in the 19th century by Samuel Kirby, also from an old Cromwell family. In 1944 it was converted into a duplex, a process that was reversed during a major restoration begun in 1953.

== See also ==
- National Register of Historic Places listings in Middlesex County, Connecticut
