= Cromwell, Connecticut =

- Town
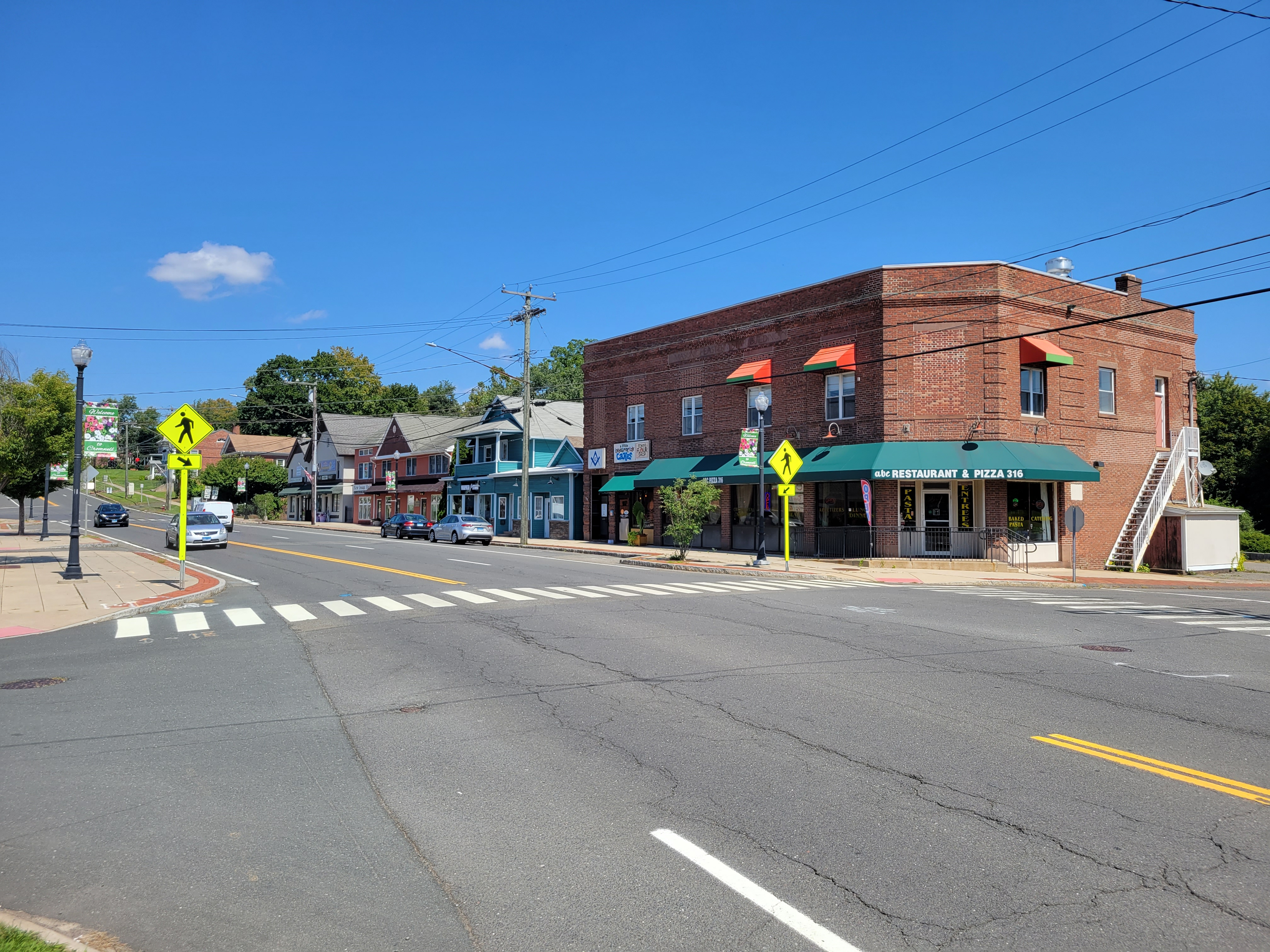
- Main Street

- Seal
- Nicknames: Crossroads of Connecticut, or the Rose City
- Interactive map of Cromwell, Connecticut
- Coordinates: 41°36′35″N 72°39′47″W
- Country: United States
- U.S. state: Connecticut
- County: Middlesex
- Region: Lower CT River Valley
- Incorporated: June 18, 1851

Government
  - Type: Council-Manager
  - Mayor: James Demetriades (D)
  - Town council: Jack Henehan (R) (Deputy Mayor); Brian Bonneau (R); Jamin DeProto (R); Paula G. Luna (D); Anne Hulick (D); Al Waters (D)
  - Town Manager: Tony Salvatore

Area
  - Total: 13.5 sq mi (35.0 km^{2})
  - Land: 12.4 sq mi (32.1 km^{2})
  - Water: 0.50 sq mi (1.3 km^{2})
- Elevation: 128 ft (39 m)

Population (2021)
  - Total: 14,302
  - Density: 1,154/sq mi (445.5/km^{2})
- Time zone: UTC-5 (EST)
  - Summer (DST): UTC-4 (EDT)
- ZIP code: 06416
- Area codes: 860/959
- FIPS code: 09-18080
- GNIS feature ID: 0213414
- Website: www.cromwellct.com

Cromwell (/ˈkrɑːmwɛl/ CRAHM-wel) is a town in Middlesex County, Connecticut, United States, located within the Lower Connecticut River Valley Planning Region. The population was 14,225 at the 2020 census. The town is named after Oliver Cromwell, the Lord Protector of England.

== History ==
The land where Cromwell is now located, was once named for the Mattabesset, a region and settlement that was once home to Eastern Algonquian language-speaking Native Americans. This may have included the Tunxis, Quinnipiac, Wangunk, and the Wappinger. In 1651, the Mattabesset settlement was incorporated as a town by English settlers. By 1653, the colonists had renamed the settlement Middletown.

The area now known as Cromwell was referred to by many names before separating from Middletown. It was commonly referred to as the Upper Houses or Upper Middletown. Upper Middletown is surrounded by natural barriers; such as, the Connecticut River, Mattabesset River and by ridgelines in the North and West. By 1715, the Upper Houses had 50 households, their own school, church and cemetery. Before the creation of the new cemetery in January 1713, burials took place in Middletown. The earliest burial is that of Martha Gipson, who had died in February of that year. As Middletown began to emerge as one of the busiest ports in New England, the Upper Houses also boasted its own expansion of maritime industries. As industry expanded within the Upper Houses a merchant class grew with it. Some of the village's wealthier families owned slaves. Middletown was then incorporated as a city in 1784.

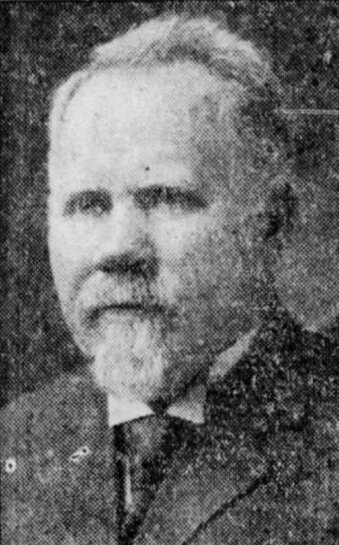
Portrait of Andrew N. Pierson

In the 19th century, the War of 1812 limited maritime trade creating a decline in the Upper Houses. Some continued to pursue maritime industry, the village generally reverted back to its agricultural beginnings. By the mid century, the area was revitalized by the founding of several new industries. John and Elisha Stevens formed the J & E Stevens Company in 1843. The company had intended to manufacture cast-iron hardware, hammers and a few iron toys. The brothers later shifted their business plan after much success with their iron toys. J & E Stevens Company would grow to become the largest manufacturer of cast-iron toys in the county. Today, toys produced by this company are a valuable collectible item. In the early 1870s, Andrew N. Pierson emigrated from Sweden and established A.N. Pierson’s Inc. The company started as a small floral nursery, and later evolved into the largest commercial rose growing enterprise in the country. These new industries and their demand for labor created further opportunities for those immigrating to the area. Irish, German and Italian immigrants found housing along the river on lower Main Street, in areas that were more prone to flooding.

With the expansion of the Upper Houses, and the geographical barriers around the town it became increasingly difficult to maintain connection with the larger city of Middletown. Initially, the Upper Houses was able to meet the needs of its residents with the creation of its own school and church, but by the mid-19th century, a stronger movement to become independent of Middletown had developed. In 1851, the General Assembly of the State of Connecticut recognized Cromwell as a new town with a population of 1,259.

The exact origin of the town's name is debated, but many acknowledge that it was named for either the 17th-century English leader Oliver Cromwell, or for the 18th century 20-gun privateer Oliver Cromwell.

Despite the continuing presence of industry, Cromwell maintained its rural character until the mid-20th century. Post-World War II the town began to change significantly, including growth in population. With the expansion of the highway system in Connecticut during the 1970s, Cromwell became an intersecting point for three major highway systems. The highway system created further retail and population development. By 1980 the population had grown to 10,265, which is over three times the size of 40 years earlier.

== Geography ==
According to the United States Census Bureau, the town has a total area of 12.9 square miles (33 km^{2}), of which 12.4 square miles (32 km^{2}) is land and 0.5 square miles (1.3 km^{2}) (4.03%) is water.

The riverfront of the area often experiences freshet during the changing of the seasons. While minor flooding has occurred since Colonial times, occasionally more serious flooding occurs, such as the historic flood of March 1936, the 1955, Hurricanes Connie and Diane, and the most recent serious flood in 1984.

A major north–south highway, Interstate 91, with two Cromwell exits, runs through the Town. The Central Connecticut Expressway (Route 9), opened at the end of 1989, enhances the Town's location as it connects to I-95 in Old Saybrook, I-91 in Cromwell and I-84, the state's major east–west highway in New Britain.

== Demographics ==
Historical population
Census	Pop.	Note	%±
1870	1,856		—
1880	1,640		−11.6%
1890	1,987		21.2%
1900	2,031		2.2%
1910	2,188		7.7%
1920	2,454		12.2%
1930	2,814		14.7%
1940	3,281		16.6%
1950	4,286		30.6%
1960	6,780		58.2%
1970	7,400		9.1%
1980	10,265		38.7%
1990	12,286		19.7%
2000	12,871		4.8%
2010	14,005		8.8%
2020	14,225		1.6%
U.S. Decennial Census

At the 2010 census there were 14,005 people, 5,212 households, and 3,262 families in the town. The population density was 1,038.5 inhabitants per square mile (401.0/km^{2}). There were 5,365 housing units at an average density of 432.9 per square mile (167.1/km^{2}). The racial makeup of the town was 93.08% White, 3.13% African American, 0.05% Native American, 1.24% Asian, 0.01% Pacific Islander, 1.03% from other races, and 1.47% from two or more races. Hispanic or Latino of any race were 3.19%.

Of the 5,212 households 28.1% had children under the age of 18 living with them, 52.0% were married couples living together, 7.8% had a female householder with no husband present, and 37.4% were non-families. 30.3% of households were one person and 11.4% were one person aged 65 or older. The average household size was 2.35 and the average family size was 2.99.

The age distribution was 21.6% under the age of 18, 5.2% from 18 to 24, 31.8% from 25 to 44, 25.3% from 45 to 64, and 16.2% 65 or older. The median age was 40 years. For every 100 females, there were 93.2 males. For every 100 females age 18 and over, there were 91.2 males.

The median household income was US$60,662, and the median family income was $70,505. Males had a median income of $46,223 versus $36,218 for females. The per capita income for the town was $29,786. About 1.6% of families and 3.4% of the population were below the poverty line, including 3.9% of those under age 18 and 3.4% of those age 65 or over.

== Economy ==
Top employers in Cromwell according to the town's 2024 Comprehensive Annual Financial Report

#	Employer	# of Employees
1	Town of Cromwell	462
2	Adelbrook Behavior & Developmental Services	356
3	Walmart	313
4	Covenant Village	274
5	GKN Aerospace	250
6	Stop & Shop	160
7	ShopRite	138
8	Lowe's	132
9	Autumn Lake Healthcare	130
10	Tournament Players Club	126

== Arts and culture ==
On the National Register of Historic Places:

- Main Street Historic District
- Middletown Upper Houses Historic District
- Sage-Kirby House

Historically Significant Places:

- Cromwell Historical Society - Located within the historic home of John Stevens, built in 1853
- Cromwell Belden Public Library’s Elizabeth Maselli Room
- The Old Burial Ground
- Hillside Cemetery, East and West
- Former Home of Emily Pierson: Listed on the National Votes for Women Trail

Private Industries and Businesses:

- TPC River Highlands – location of the Travelers Championship, PGA Tour event

== Parks and recreation ==
Community and Green Spaces:

- River Highlands State Park
- Cromwell Meadow Wildlife Management Area
- Cromwell Landings
- Pierson Park - named for Andrew N. Pierson, the Rose King of America and founder of A.N. Pierson, Inc.
- Riverport Park at Frisbee Landing
- Watrous Park
- Patriot's Corner
- Memorial Town Green
- Valour Memorial Green
- Gold Star Green

== Government ==
Voter registration and party enrollment as of October 27, 2020
Party	Active voters	Inactive voters	Total voters	Percentage
Democratic	3,511	190	3,701	32.98%
Republican	2,418	98	2,516	22.42%
Unaffiliated	4,607	180	4,787	42.66%
Minor parties	211	7	218	1.94%
Total	10,747	475	11,222	100%

Presidential Election Results
Year	Democratic	Republican	Third Parties
2024	53.6% 4,635	44.2% 3,816	2.2% 189
2020	55.5% 4,872	42.7% 3,749	1.8% 162
2016	49.5% 3,808	45.3% 3,486	5.2% 400
2012	55.3% 4,063	43.5% 3,193	1.2% 92
2008	59.4% 4,551	39.0% 2,989	1.6% 120
2004	55.2% 4,126	43.2% 3,226	1.6% 121
2000	58.0% 3,865	37.1% 2,472	14.9% 328
1996	54.2% 3,389	32.1% 2,007	13.7% 857
1992	43.0% 3,030	32.8% 2,306	24.2% 1,704
1988	48.0% 2,955	50.9% 3,135	1.1% 66
1984	40.6% 2,204	59.2% 3,213	0.2% 11
1980	41.3% 2,185	40.9% 2,168	17.8% 943
1976	51.0% 2,519	48.6% 2,399	0.4% 23
1972	45.4% 1,957	53.5% 2,306	1.1% 47
1968	53.7% 1,899	40.7% 1,439	5.6% 198
1964	71.1% 2,461	28.9% 999	0.00% 0
1960	54.4% 1,918	45.6% 1,607	0.00% 0
1956	34.2% 993	65.8% 1,909	0.00% 0

== Education ==
There are four public schools in Cromwell: Edna C. Stevens Elementary School (Pre-K–2), Woodside Intermediate School (3–5), Cromwell Middle School (6–8), and Cromwell High School (9–12).

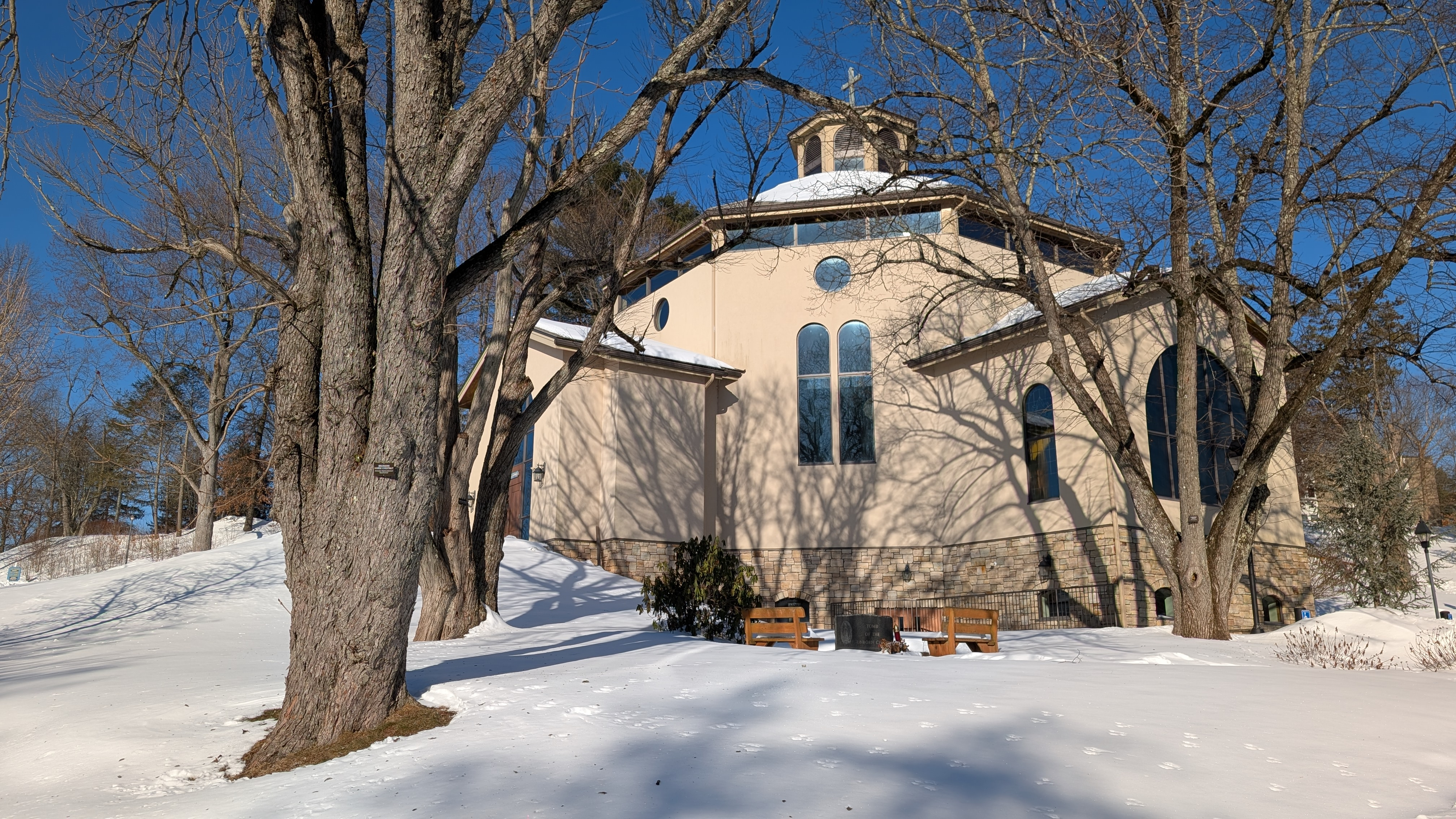
Chapel at Holy Apostles College and Seminary

Crowell is the Home of one institute of higher education, Holy Apostles College and Seminary, which is a Catholic college focusing on theology, philosophy, and related topics, and offering extensive online degrees.

== Infrastructure ==
=== Fire department ===
Fire Protection is provided by the Cromwell Fire District via the Cromwell Fire Department. The Cromwell Fire Department is a combination fire department that operates out of three stations, on a rotating 24/7 schedule with six Firefighter/EMT's assigned to each shift. The Fire Department operates ambulances. Full time firefighters are supplemented by part-time and volunteer firefighters.

=== Highways ===
- Interstate 91 in Connecticut
- Connecticut Route 3
- Connecticut Route 9
- Connecticut Route 99

== Notable people ==
- David Gere, actor and film producer, Gere was born and raised in Cromwell and attended Cromwell High School, class of 1993
- Donald Honig, novelist, historian and editor; lived in Cromwell for over 40 years. In September 2020, there was a ceremony at the Cromwell Belden Public Library where Honig was given with a key to the town and presented with a proclamation declaring it "Donald Honig Day." In his honor, there is a special "Donald Honig Collection," where many of his books are on display at the library
- Chad Ripperger, a well known Catholic Priest, theologian, philosopher and exorcist. Ripperger had studied at the Holy Apostles College and Seminary located in Cromwell, CT.
- Josiah Belden, born in Upper Houses in 1815, he left the town in 1831. He was a member of the first wagon train taking settlers to California in 1841. There, he became wealthy running a general store during the Gold Rush. In 1888 Belden sent a substantial donation for the new public library in Cromwell.
- Emily Pierson, a graduate from Vassar College, and received a master’s degree at Columbia University. Pierson was actively involved in the Connecticut Effort to win the vote for women. After the 19th amendment was ratified, Pierson attended Yale Medical School, graduating in 1924 when she was in her mid-40s. She then practiced medicine in Cromwell for 40 years, while serving as the town director of health and the school physician.
- Olive D. Pierson (died 1969), state representative
- Wallace R. Pierson (died 1946), florist and state senator
- James Timothy Pratt, a U.S. Representative who was born in Cromwell in 1802.
- Rufus B. Sage, born in the Upper Houses in 1817, an American writer, journalist and mountain man. After all his adventures, he returned home to Cromwell where he spent the rest of his life.

== In popular culture ==
- A season 6 episode of the Discovery Channel series A Haunting, called The Well from Hell, takes place in Cromwell in 2011.
- In season 13, episode 21 of Bob's Burgers, titled Mother Author Laser Pointer, Connecticut author Bea Cromwell's surname is a reference to the town of the same name.
