= Main Street Historic District (Cromwell, Connecticut) =

Historic district in Connecticut, United States

- U.S. National Register of Historic Places
- U.S. Historic district
- Location within Connecticut Location within the United States
- Location: Roughly bounded by Nooks Hill Road, Prospect Hill Road, Wall and West Streets and New Lane, and Stevens Lane and Main Street; Cromwell, Connecticut
- Coordinates: 41.604°N 72.647°W
- Area: 130 acres (53 ha)
- NRHP reference No.: 85003389
- Added to NRHP: October 24, 1985

The Main Street Historic District in Cromwell, Connecticut is roughly bounded by Nooks Hill Road, Prospect Hill Road, Wall and West Streets, and New Lane, and Stevens Lane and Main Street.

It includes two town greens (Valour Green and Memorial Green), historic homes and the Cromwell Historical Society. The historic district is primarily linear and starts from "Patriots Corner" (a grassy area at the corner of Main and Wall Streets with several memorials) and runs north along Main Street (Route 99) past the Memorial Green at Wall Street. Towards the northern end, the district widens to encompass both Main Street and Prospect Hill Road until about Nooks Hill Road, including the Valour Green. The district comprises 66 contributing buildings and structures and has an area of 130 acres (53 ha). The district is notable in capturing the transformation of a rural 18th-century village center into a 20th-century town, with representative architecture from every major architectural style seen between 1750 and 1935. The district was listed on the National Register of Historic Places in 1985.

Cromwell was settled in the 17th century, and remained predominantly agricultural in character well into the 19th century. It had a small but locally important port on the Connecticut River, which declined in the 19th century, and Main Street afterward became the principal economic and civic area of the town. Main Street was part of a major turnpike route, connecting Hartford and Old Saybrook, and is where the town's early civic buildings were located.

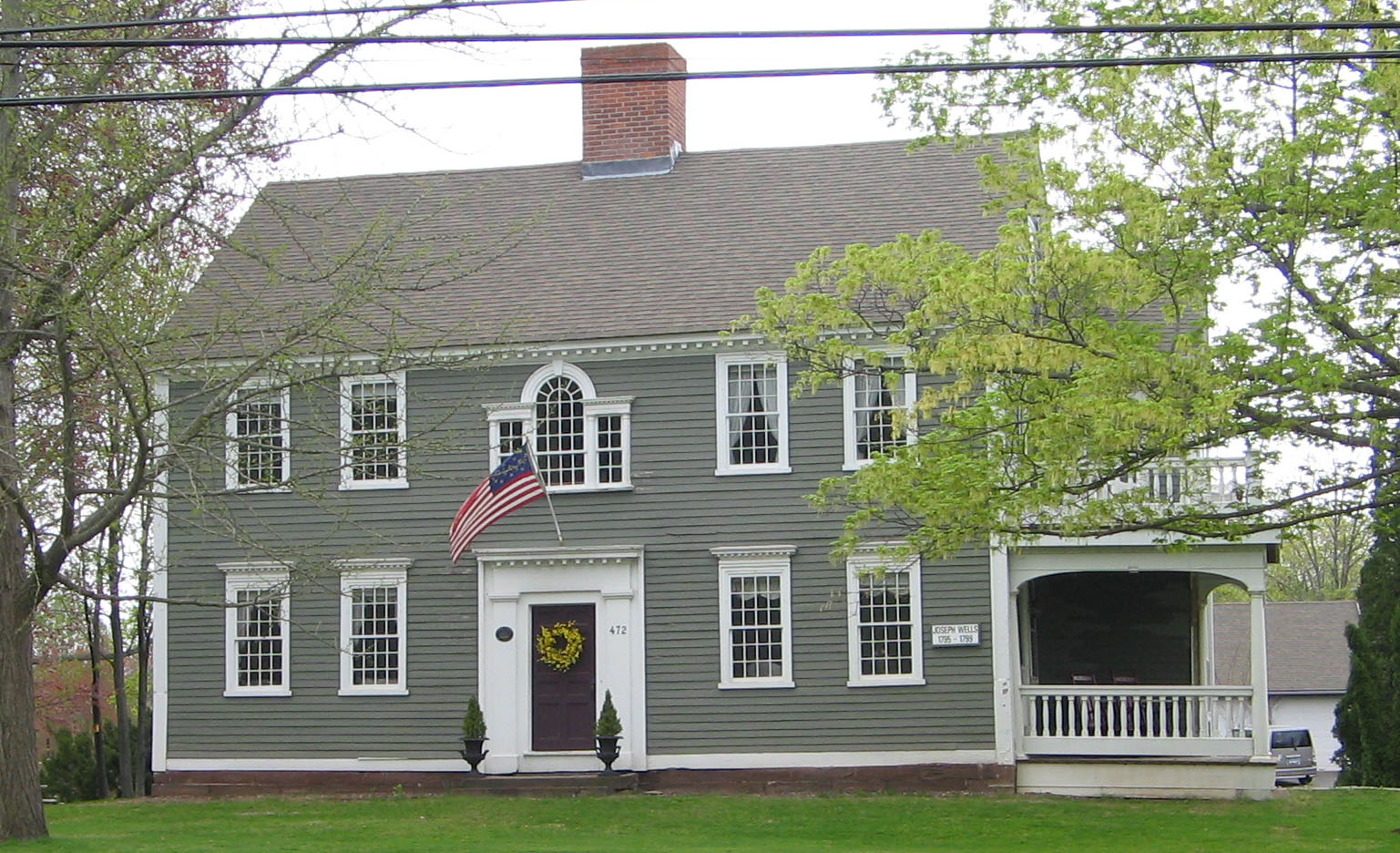
A historic home in the Main Street Historic District of Cromwell, CT

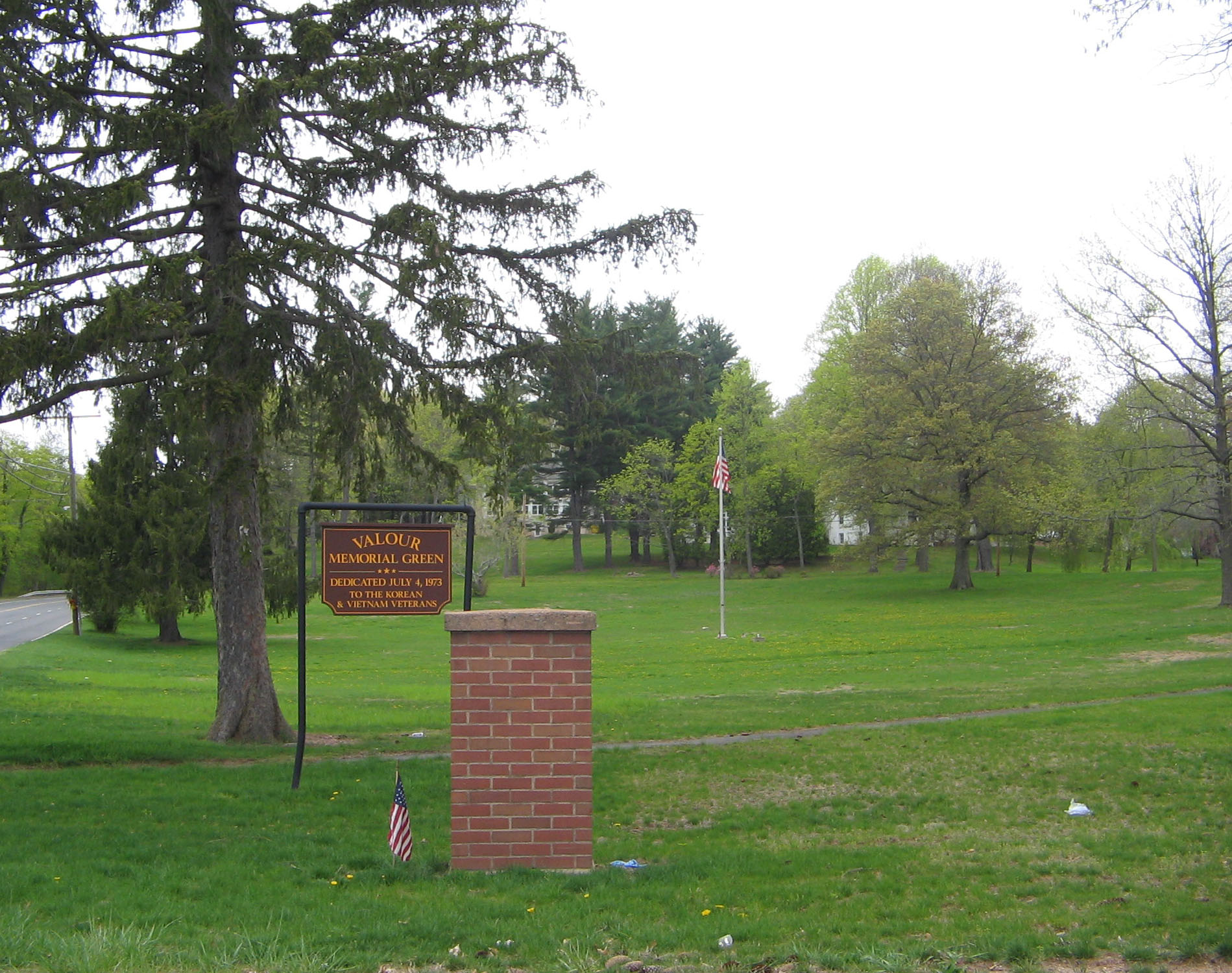
The Valour Green between Main Street and Prospect Hill Roads

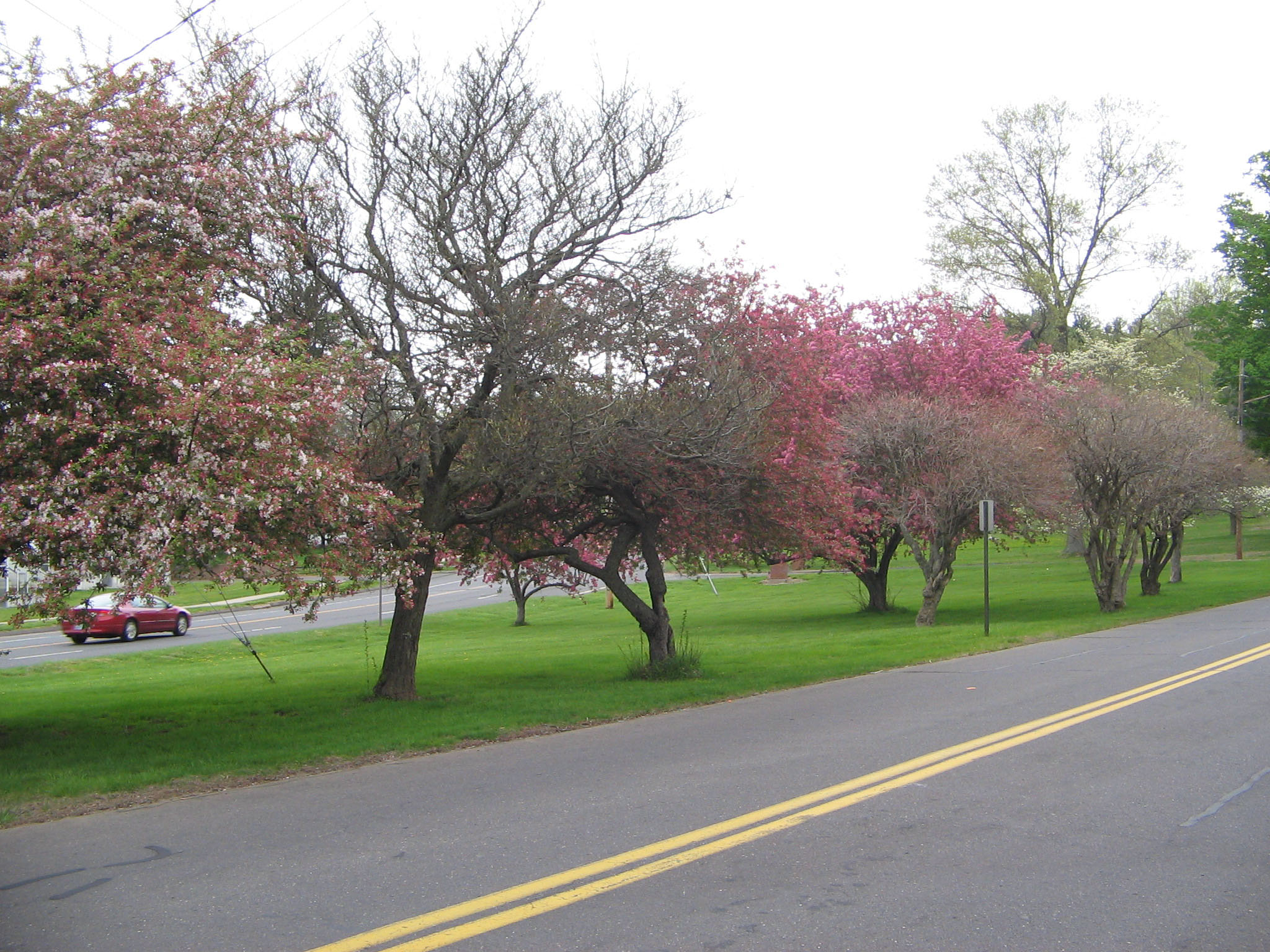
Trees on the Town Green between Main Street and Prospect Hill Roads

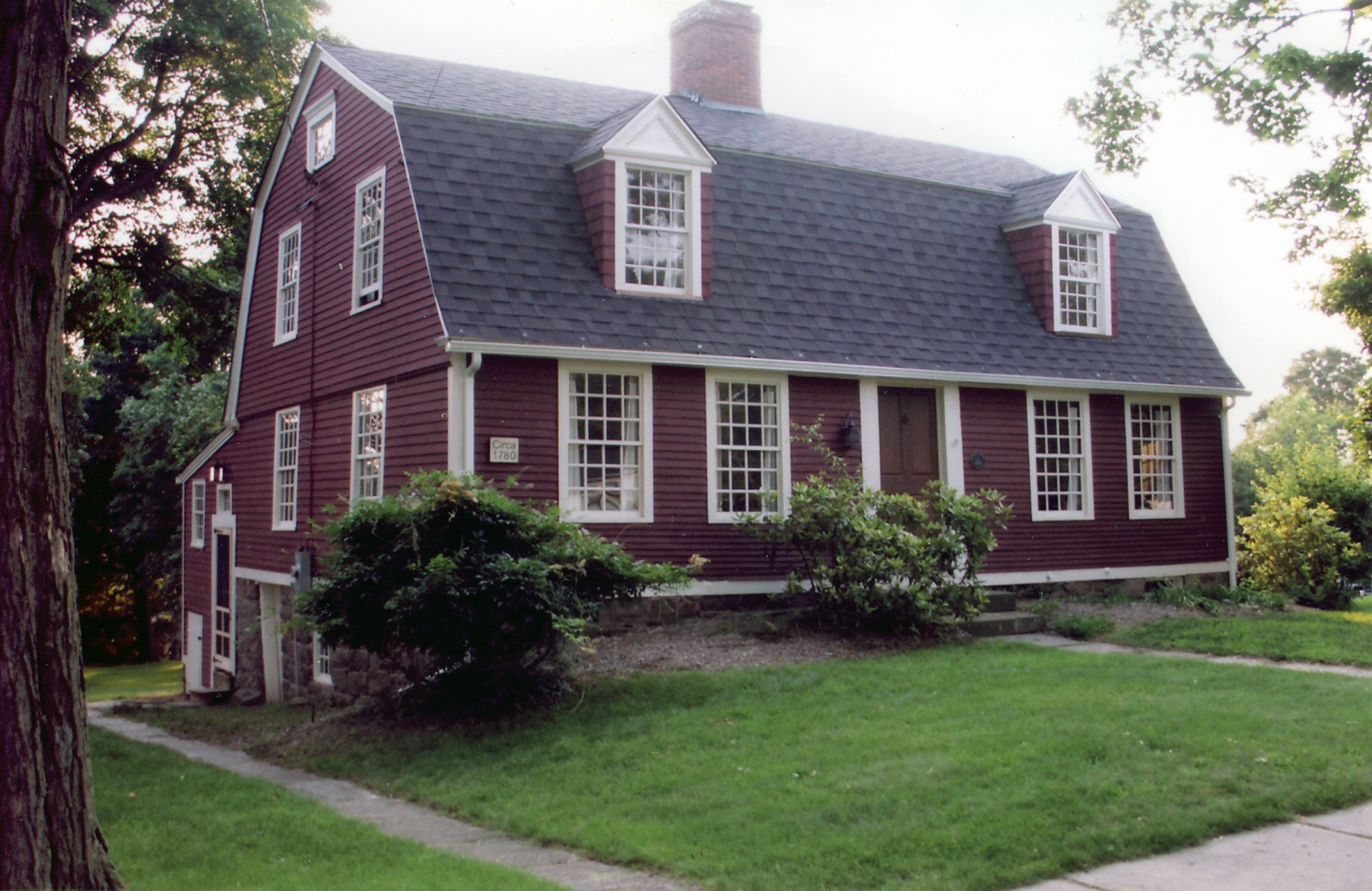
Riley-Gridley House in the Main Street Historic District of Cromwell, CT

== See also ==
- National Register of Historic Places listings in Middlesex County, Connecticut
