= Middletown Upper Houses Historic District =

Historic district in Connecticut, United States

- U.S. National Register of Historic Places
- U.S. Historic district
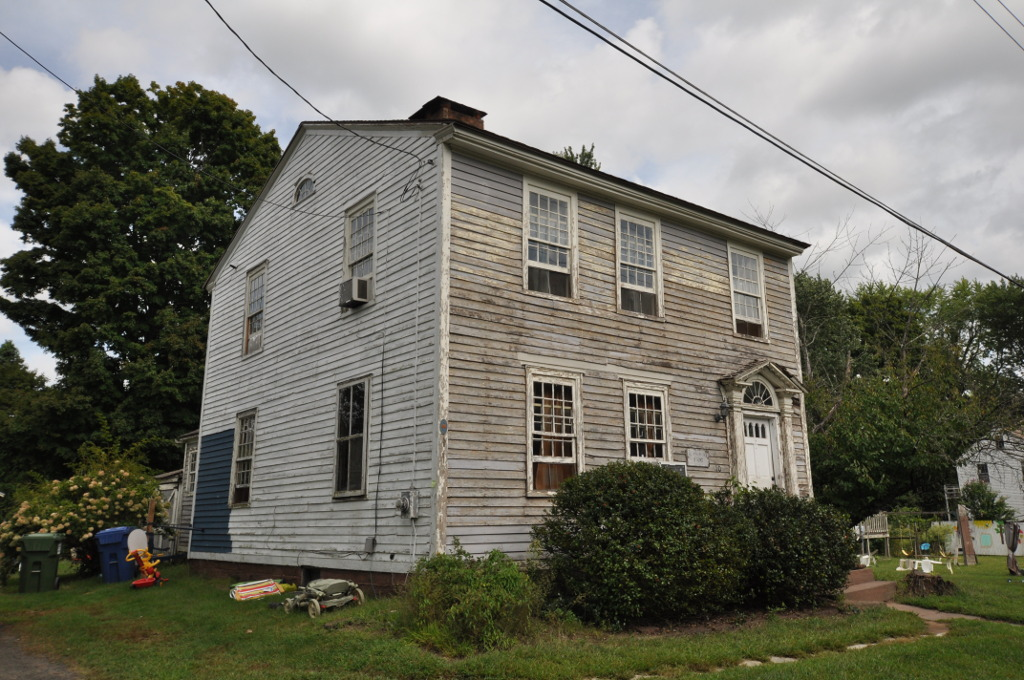

- Location within Connecticut Location within the United States
- Location: Between CT 99 and the Connecticut River, Cromwell, Connecticut
- Coordinates: 41°35′19″N 72°38′28″W
- Area: 70 acres (28 ha)
- Built: c. 1745, c. 1800 and c. 1830
- Architectural style: Late Victorian, Colonial, and Federal
- NRHP reference No.: 79002620
- Added to NRHP: July 27, 1979

The Middletown Upper Houses Historic District, also known as the Upper Houses River Port, encompasses the historic early nucleus of Cromwell, Connecticut. Sandwiched between Main Street and the Connecticut River, this area was set off from neighboring Middletown in 1851. It is visually dominated by residential structures built before 1810. The area grew as a significant river port and shipbuilding center until the mid-19th century. The district was listed on the National Register of Historic Places in 1979.

== Description and history ==
The Middletown Upper Houses area was laid out about 1650, as one of two settlements flanking the mouth of the Little River on the west bank of the Connecticut River. The northern settlement eventually became Cromwell, incorporating out of Middletown (the site of the "Lower Houses") in 1851. By the mid-18th century, Upper Houses was a thriving seaport, engage in domestic trade and with the West Indies. The maritime trade declined beginning in the 1830s, supported in part by the shipping of brownstone from local quarries. The village was unable to expand due to geographic constraints (it is in the floodplain and surrounded by marshland) and declined in the late 19th century.

The historic district includes a small grid of streets sandwiched between Main Street (Connecticut Route 99) and the river. River Street runs parallel to the riverbank, as does Pleasant Street a short way inland. These are joined by School, South, and Wall Streets. There are now relatively few traces of the area's maritime trade history, and the area's isolation gives it the feel of a sleepy residential neighborhood. There are 72 houses in this area, with almost half predating 1820. This concentration of colonial and Federal housing has integrated examples of later architecture, from the Victorian to post-World War II construction. The waterfront includes the remnants of a dock area used for the loading of brownstone.

== See also ==
- National Register of Historic Places listings in Middlesex County, Connecticut
