= Olive D. Pierson =

American politician (died 1969)

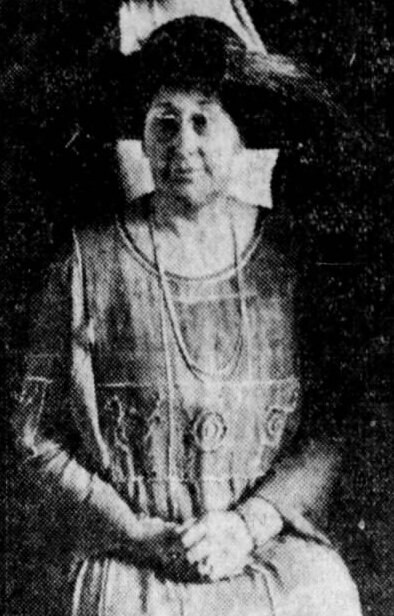
- Pierson in a 1923 newspaper

Member of the Connecticut House of Representatives from Cromwell
- In office 1933–1935
- Preceded by: Raymond S. Coe
- Succeeded by: Charles M. Sanford

Personal details
- Born: Mary Olive Dailey
- Died: February 16, 1969 (aged 93) Middletown, Connecticut, U.S.
- Resting place: West Cemetery
- Party: Republican
- Spouse: Wallace R. Pierson (div. 1936)
- Children: 2
- Education: Indiana University Bloomington (BA); Wellesley College
- Occupation: Politician; educator

Mary Olive Dailey Pierson (née Dailey; died February 16, 1969) was an American politician from Connecticut. She served in the Connecticut House of Representatives from 1933 to 1935.

== Early life ==
Born Mary Olive Dailey, Pierson was from Decatur, Indiana. She graduated from Indiana University Bloomington in 1903 with a Bachelor of Arts. She was a member of the Delta chapter of Kappa Kappa Gamma. She did graduate work at Wellesley College.

== Career ==
Pierson was head of the Latin department at Middletown High School in Middletown, Connecticut, from 1904 to 1905.

Pierson was elected to the Connecticut House of Representatives in 1932, representing the town of Cromwell as a Republican. She served from 1933 to 1935. She was defeated for re-election in 1934 by Democratic nominee Charles M. Sanford. She was a member of the National Order of Women Legislators. She was a Republican and active in politics in Middlesex County. She was the first woman vice chairman of the Connecticut State Central Committee in the 33rd district. She was the vice chairman of the Republican town committee for 40 years and served as the first vice president of the Republican Club in Cromwell.

Pierson was president of the American Red Cross during World War I. She was second president of the PTA in Cromwell. She was a charter member of the Middletown College Club (later the AAUW). She was a member of the Cromwell Home Club for 45 years and served as chairman in Cromwell for 10 years for their Easter Seal sale. She was the organization's district director for 10 years.

== Personal life ==
Pearson married Wallace R. Pierson. They had two sons, Andrew A. and Wallace R. Jr. The couple divorced in 1936.

In 1905, she moved to Cromwell. She died on February 16, 1969, aged 93, at New Sanibel in Middletown. She was buried in West Cemetery.
