= Keenesburg, Colorado =

Town in Colorado, United States

Town of Keenesburg, Colorado
- Statutory Town
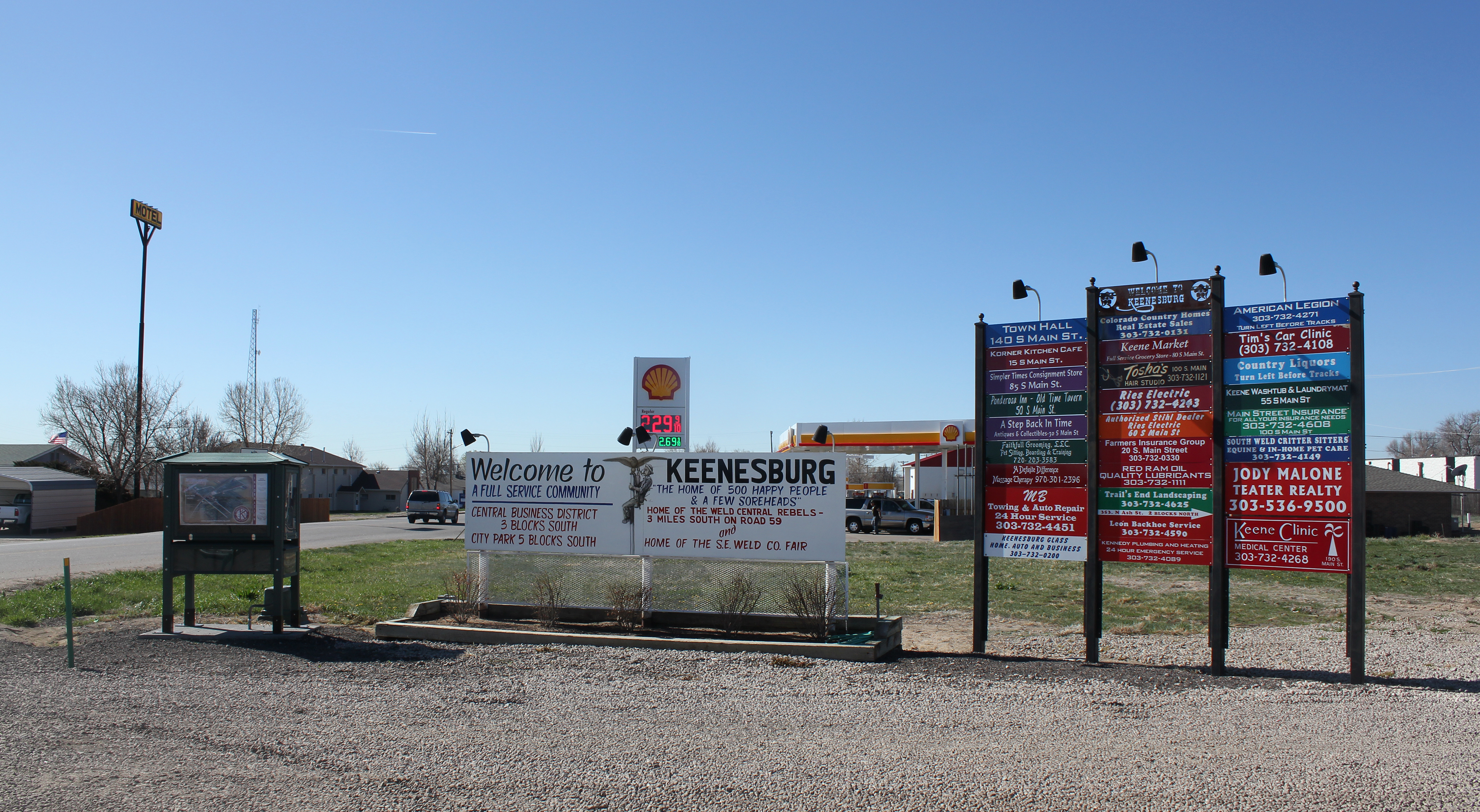
- Signs along Market Street in Keenesburg.
- Motto(s): Home of 500 happy people and a few soreheads
- Location of Keenesburg in Weld County, Colorado.
- Coordinates: 40°07′30″N 104°31′22″W
- Country: United States
- State: Colorado
- County: Weld
- Incorporated (town): June 4, 1919

Government
  - Type: Statutory Town

Area
  - Total: 3.46 sq mi (8.96 km^{2})
  - Land: 3.43 sq mi (8.89 km^{2})
  - Water: 0.027 sq mi (0.07 km^{2})
- Elevation: 4,974 ft (1,516 m)

Population (2020)
  - Total: 1,250
  - Density: 364/sq mi (141/km^{2})
- Time zone: UTC-7 (Mountain (MST))
  - Summer (DST): UTC-6 (MDT)
- ZIP code: 80643
- Area code: 303
- FIPS code: 08-40185
- GNIS feature ID: 2412820
- Website: Town website

The Town of Keenesburg is a Statutory Town in Weld County, Colorado, United States. The population was 1,250 at the 2020 United States census. It is home to The Wild Animal Sanctuary, as well as to the Society of the Most Sorrowful Mother.

== History ==
Keenesburg was named for Les Keene, an early settler.

== Geography ==
According to the United States Census Bureau, the town has a total area of 0.6 square miles (1.6 km^{2}), of which, 0.6 square miles (1.6 km^{2}) of it is land and 1.75% is water.

== Government ==
In August 2025 it was announced that mayor Aron Lam and board of trustees member Cindy Baumgartner would face a recall election. The recall election was held in September 2025 and Lam was recalled, with Bruce Sparrow being voted in as his successor. Baumgartner was also recalled, with Christopher Miller elected unopposed as her successor. Sparrow and Miller were sworn in on October 10, 2025.

== Demographics ==
Historical population
Census	Pop.	Note	%±
1920	164		—
1930	297		81.1%
1940	284		−4.4%
1950	432		52.1%
1960	409		−5.3%
1970	427		4.4%
1980	541		26.7%
1990	570		5.4%
2000	855		50.0%
2010	1,127		31.8%
2020	1,250		10.9%

=== 2020 census ===
As of the 2020 census, Keenesburg had a population of 1,250. The median age was 38.2 years. 21.3% of residents were under the age of 18 and 16.2% of residents were 65 years of age or older. For every 100 females there were 110.8 males, and for every 100 females age 18 and over there were 106.3 males age 18 and over.

0.0% of residents lived in urban areas, while 100.0% lived in rural areas.

There were 475 households in Keenesburg, of which 32.0% had children under the age of 18 living in them. Of all households, 50.3% were married-couple households, 22.3% were households with a male householder and no spouse or partner present, and 21.3% were households with a female householder and no spouse or partner present. About 26.8% of all households were made up of individuals and 12.0% had someone living alone who was 65 years of age or older.

There were 514 housing units, of which 7.6% were vacant. The homeowner vacancy rate was 2.3% and the rental vacancy rate was 9.7%.

Racial composition as of the 2020 census
Race	Number	Percent
White	1,060	84.8%
Black or African American	20	1.6%
American Indian and Alaska Native	7	0.6%
Asian	1	0.1%
Native Hawaiian and Other Pacific Islander	0	0.0%
Some other race	51	4.1%
Two or more races	111	8.9%
Hispanic or Latino (of any race)	165	13.2%

== Media ==
The Lost Creek Sentinel, formerly called The Lost Creek Guide, is a local newspaper based in Keenesburg. The paper is published monthly and its coverage includes southeast Weld county, Morgan County and parts of rural Adams County.

== See also ==
- Front Range Urban Corridor
- North Central Colorado Urban Area
- Denver-Aurora-Boulder, CO Combined Statistical Area
- Greeley, CO Metropolitan Statistical Area
