= Pirson =

Pirson or Pirsson is a surname. Notable people with the surname include:

- André-Eugène Pirson (1817–1881), Belgian liberal politician, civil servant, and former governor of the National Bank of Belgium
- James W. Pirsson, AIA, (1833–1888), American architect and a founder of a New York City architectural firm
- Sören Pirson (born 1985), German footballer

== See also ==
- Hubert, Pirsson & Company, New York City architectural firm active from c.1870 to 1888
- Prison
