= Holy Apostles College and Seminary =

Catholic college and seminary in Cromwell, Connecticut, US

Coordinates: 41.6031°N 72.6498°W

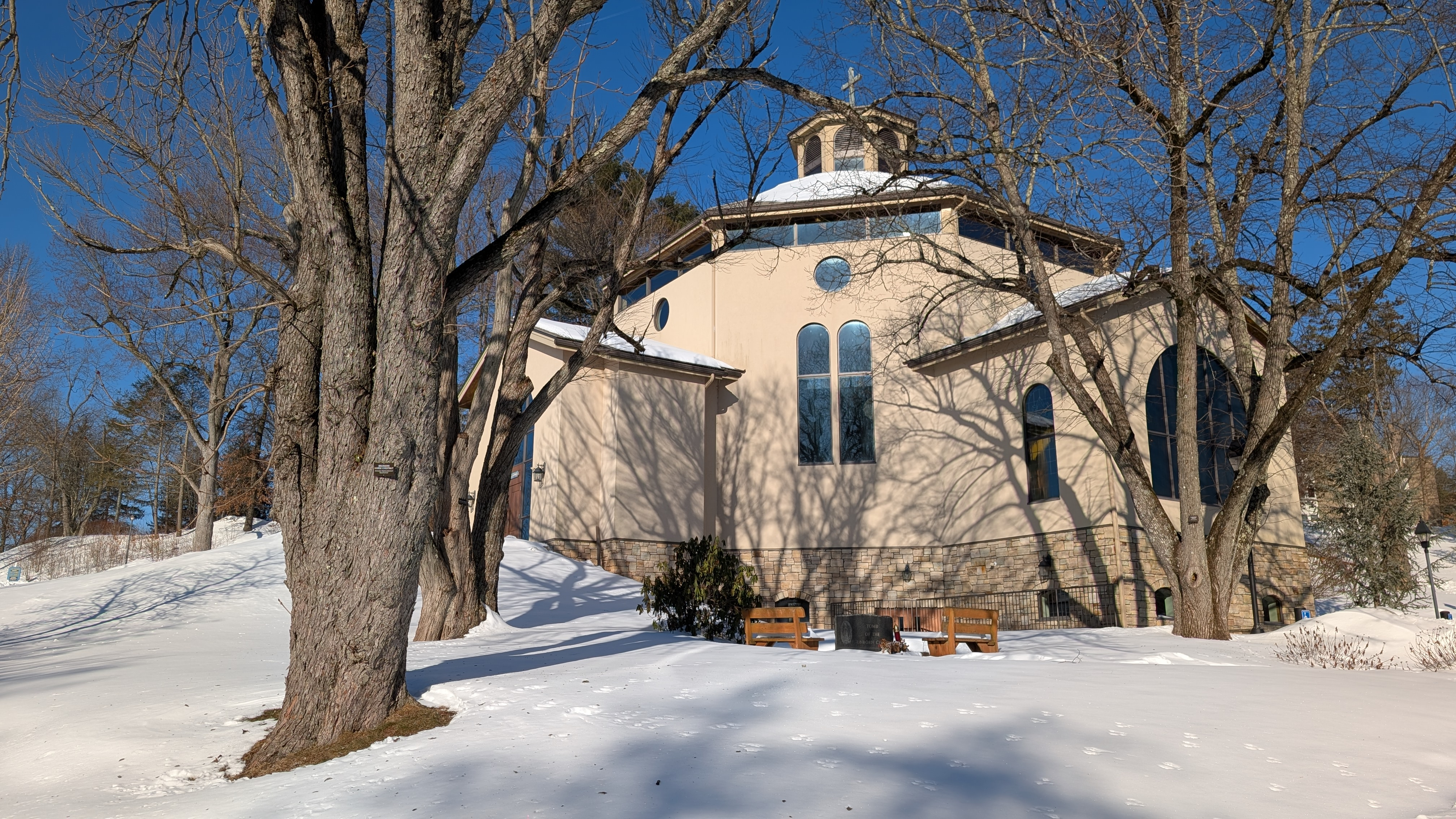
- Seminary Chapel from outside
- Motto: Live Your Mission
- Type: Private college and seminary
- Established: 1956
- Religious affiliation: Catholic Church (Missionaries of the Holy Apostles)
- President: Fr. Peter S. Kucer
- Undergraduates: 164
- Postgraduates: 361
- Location: Cromwell, Connecticut, United States
- Campus: 40 acres (16 ha)
- Website: Holy Apostles

Holy Apostles College and Seminary is a Catholic seminary in Cromwell, Connecticut, United States.

== History ==
Holy Apostles was founded in 1956 on a 40-acre (160,000 m2) property in Cromwell, Connecticut, by Franciscan priest Eusèbe M. Ménard to provide a program of education and formation for men intending to enter the Catholic priesthood. It began as a college level, preparatory seminary, which Ménard entrusted to the Missionaries of the Holy Apostles. In 1972, Holy Apostles, in view of declining enrollment, began admitting non-seminarians, women included. In 1977, it added a Master of Divinity program and became a major as well as a minor seminary. Graduate degrees have been available to lay students since 1982.

In 1998, Holy Apostles partnered with International Catholic University, founded by Ralph McInerny, and opened two online graduate programs, a Master of Arts in Theology and a Master of Arts in Philosophy. In 2011, Holy Apostles established a Master of Arts in Pastoral Studies program, which became available online in 2013. In 2012, recognizing the growing need for online undergraduate programs, Holy Apostles added undergraduate-level courses to its online programming. In 2014, the State of Connecticut Office of Higher Education approved the college for a 100% online undergraduate program (both in the Associate of Arts and the Bachelor of Arts degree programs).

In 2019, Peter S. Kucer became president/rector of the college taking over from the long-serving Douglas Mosey (1996–2019). According to the school's website, "In June 2026, the Board of Commissioners approved a five-year experiment to offer the school’s PhD in Theology degree program fully online."

== Academics ==
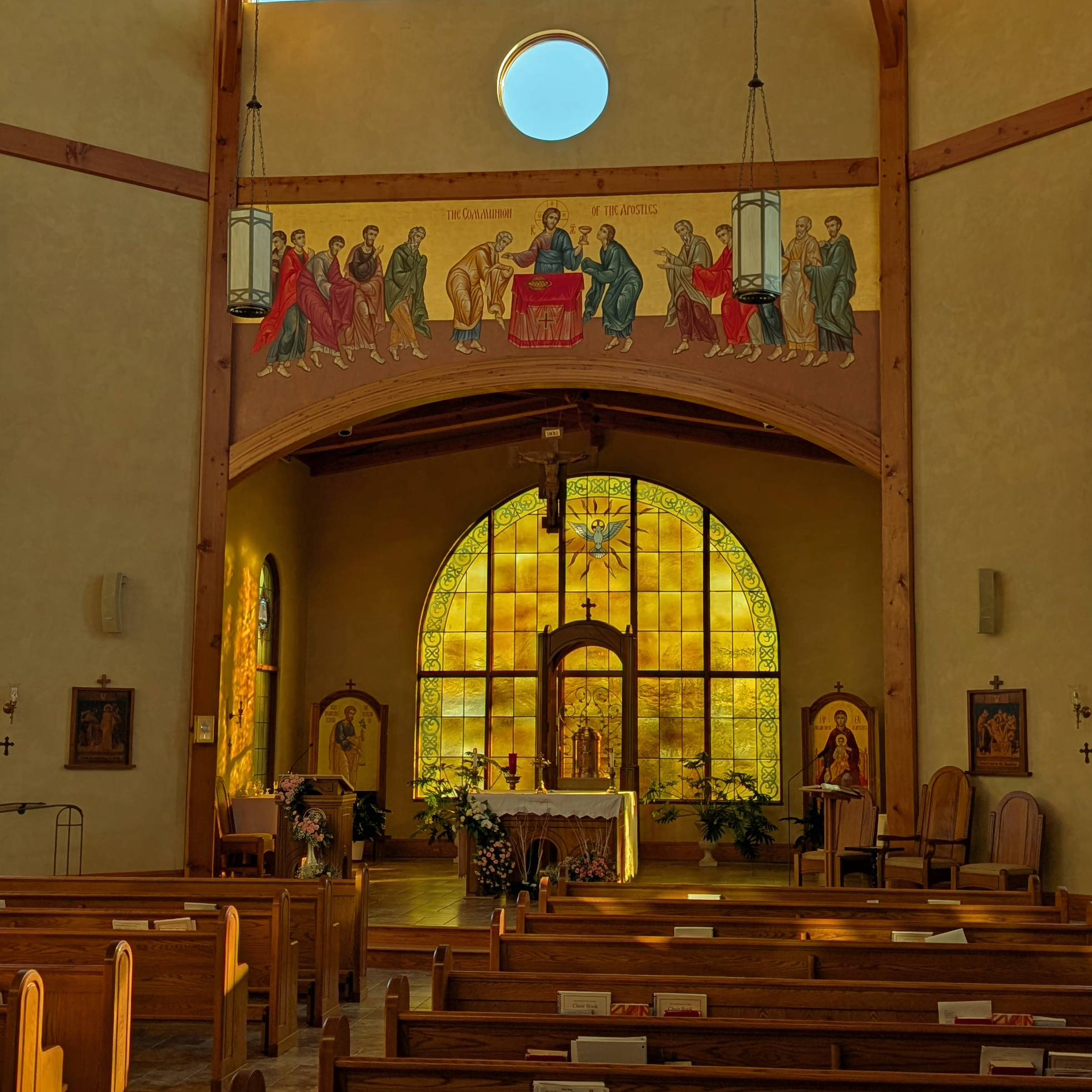
Inside the Holy Apostles Chapel

Holy Apostles is accredited by the New England Commission of Higher Education and the Connecticut Office of Higher Education. Additionally, Holy Apostles' graduate degree programs are accredited by the Association of Theological Schools in the United States and Canada.

Five of the members of its board of directors are from the founding religious order, the Missionaries of the Holy Apostles. The institution places heavy emphasis on the academic disciplines of philosophy and theology in the context of the Catholic honors liberal arts curriculum. Half of the undergraduate courses are a part of the required core. This includes a distribution of courses in theology, philosophy, English, and history. In addition to its master's programs, the institution offers Associate of Arts and Bachelor of Arts programs as well as the Take Credit! Program for high school juniors and seniors.
