= Piersons Lake =

Lake in the state of Minnesota, United States

- Location within Minnesota
- Location: Carver County, Minnesota
- Coordinates: 44°50′N 93°42′W
- Type: lake

Piersons Lake is a lake in Carver County, Minnesota, in the United States.

Piersons Lake was named for John Pierson, a pioneer who settled there.
