= Pierson Creek =

Stream in Woodbury and Cherokee counties, Iowa

Pierson Creek is a stream in Woodbury County and Cherokee County, in the US state of Iowa. It is a tributary of the Little Sioux River.

The headwaters are at 42°39′40″N 95°46′31″W and the confluence with the Little Sioux are at 42°28′58″N 95°47′34″W.

The name of the stream was named after Andrew Pierson, a pioneer settler.

== See also ==
- List of rivers of Iowa
- Little Sioux River
