= Thomas White (California politician) =

American politician

Thomas W. White was an American politician. He was the mayor of San Jose, California from 1851 to 1854.
