= Lydia Jane Wheeler Peirson =

American poet

Lydia Jane Wheeler Peirson (1802–1862; sometimes spelled Pierson) was an American poet, nicknamed "the forest minstrel".

"Like a great majority of women, she had too little knowledge of business to enable her to realize the pecuniary recompense that was due her labors. She has been, for a long time, a contributor to papers that have a wide circulation, yet has seldom received more than the paper and an occasional volume sent the editor for review, as compensation.— The proceeds of one volume of her poems, she donated to a theological seminary; for the other she received nothing. The publishers found rapid sale for the work, but soon after its issue were burnt out, and a great share of the edition destroyed. They maintained that they had received only enough to compensate them for their expense, and gave her nothing."

== Early years ==
Born in Middletown, Connecticut, she was the daughter to William Wheeler. She developed an aptitude for literary works at an early age, writing and singing verses before age 12. These first songs were about God and nature. She memorized entire books, including The Shipwreck, The Lady of the Lake, Lalla-Rookh, The Bride of Abydos, and The Corsair. At the age of 16, she moved with her parents to Canandaigua, New York and married Oliver Peirson two years later.

== Career ==
With her husband, Peirson moved to the western portion of Liberty Township, Tioga County, Pennsylvania in 1821. Suffering from loneliness and seclusion at their rural home in the woods of the Allegheny Mountains, she began to write. For many years, her children were financially dependent on her efforts. She was a prolific author, chiefly for magazines and newspapers, her published poems filling more than a thousand common octavo pages. Though Peirson wrote more prose than poems, her prose papers were not collected. Her writings were often about nature. Peirson published two volumes of poems: "Forest Leaves," in 1846 and " The Forest Minstrel," in 1847. In 1849, she edited the Lancaster Literary Gazette; she was also the chief writer for the Ladies' Garland, a periodical for women which flourished in the 1840s. She contributed prose and verse to the Southern Literary Magazine and The New Real. In 1853, Peirson settled in Adrian, Michigan where she died in 1862.
