= Wallace R. Pierson =

American politician and florist (died 1946)

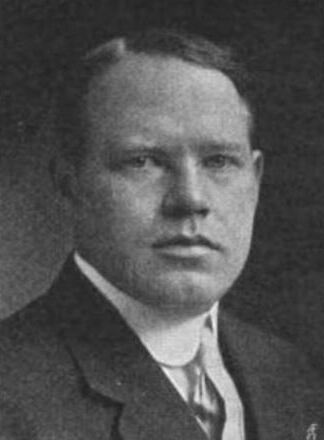
- Photo of Pierson, c. 1910

Member of the Connecticut Senate from the 33rd district
- In office 1923–1930
- Succeeded by: Don Cambria

Personal details
- Born: Wallace Rogers Pierson
- Died: November 4, 1946 (aged 66) Cromwell, Connecticut, U.S.
- Resting place: West Cemetery; Cromwell, Connecticut, U.S.
- Party: Republican
- Spouses: Olive Dailey (div. 1936) Mary Salzman (m. 1936)
- Children: 2
- Relatives: Emily Pierson (sister)
- Education: Massachusetts Agricultural College
- Occupation: Politician; florist

Wallace Rogers Pierson (died November 4, 1946) was an American politician and florist from Connecticut. He served in the Connecticut Senate from 1923 to 1930.

== Early life ==
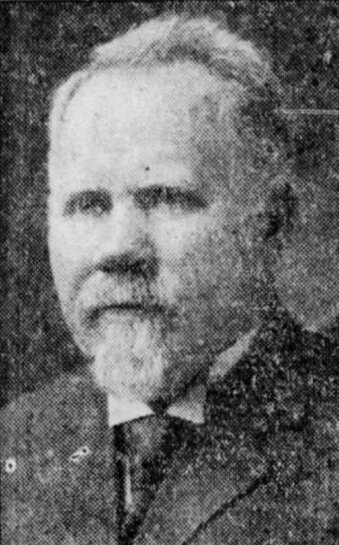
Portrait of Andrew N. Pierson

Wallace Rogers Pierson was born to Margaret (née Allison) and Andrew N. Pierson. His sister was suffragist Emily Pierson. He graduated from Massachusetts Agricultural College in 1901.

== Career ==
Following graduation, Pierson was associated with his father's greenhouses and his company A. N. Pierson Inc. After his father died in 1925, he became president of the firm. The plant in Cromwell, Connecticut, expanded to have 30 acres (12 ha) under glass and have 200 acres (81 ha) of nursery stock. In 1913, he served as president of the American Rose Society and was a member of the publicity committee of the American Florists Society. In 1925, while president of the Flower Producers' Co-operative Association, Pierson and the organization were charged with violating the Sherman Antitrust Act. The claim was that the organization had worked with wholesalers in September 1925 to exclude hothouse flowers from the market. Pierson and the organization pled guilty to avoid trial and agreed to make no further agreements with wholesalers on their products. They reportedly received no fine or penalty.

Pierson was a Republican. He was elected to the Connecticut Senate, defeating Democratic nominee Dayton A. Baldwin in 1922. He was re-elected in 1924, 1926, and 1928. He represented the 33rd district. He did not seek re-election in 1930 and was succeeded by Don Cambria.

Pierson served as the first chairman of Cromwell's board of finance. He was an incorporator of the Cromwell Dime Savings Bank and a director of the Middletown branch of the Hartford-Connecticut Trust Company.

== Personal life ==
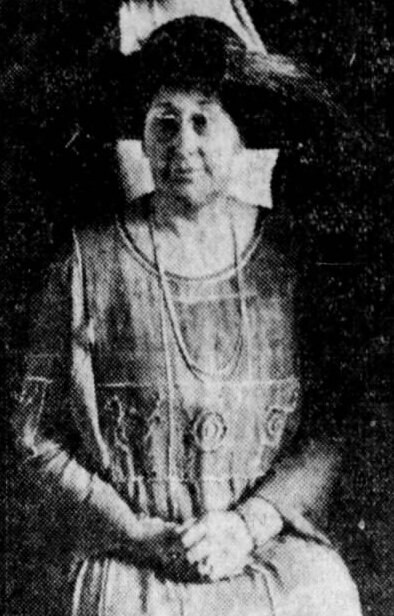
Photo of Olive D. Pierson in 1923

Pierson married Olive Dailey. They had two sons, Andrew A. and Wallace Rogers Jr. His wife was a member of the Connecticut House of Representatives. The couple divorced in 1936. He then married Mary Salzman of Hartford. He lived in Cromwell. He was a member of the Congregational Church of Cromwell. He was also a member of Washington Lodge No. 81 of the Ancient Free and Accepted Masons, Washington Chapter No. 6 of the Royal Arch Masonry, Cyrene Commandery No. 8 of the Knights Templars, the Sphinx Temple, and the Knights of Pythias.

Pierson died on November 4, 1946, aged 66, at his home on Prospect Road in Cromwell. He was buried in West Cemetery in Cromwell.
