= The Rainbow History Project =

LGBT history group in Washington DC

The Rainbow History Project, also known as RHP, is an American history project founded in Washington, D.C. in November 2000. Its purpose is to “collect, preserve, and promote an active knowledge of the history, arts, and culture of metropolitan Washington DC's diverse LGBTQ+ communities.” RHP's various activities include collecting oral histories, providing walking tours, hosting panel presentations, gathering archival materials, recognizing community pioneers, and research assistance.

== WorldPride 2025 Exhibition: "Pickets, Protests, and Parades" ==
In 2025, the Rainbow History Project is presenting its largest exhibition to date, “Pickets, Protests, and Parades: The History of Gay Pride in Washington,” as part of WorldPride in Washington, D.C. The free outdoor exhibit will be on display at Freedom Plaza from May 17 through July 7, 2025, and is expected to reach millions of visitors. The exhibition disrupts the commonly held belief that the LGBTQ+ Rights Movement began with the Stonewall Riots, highlighting instead the earlier activism of the Mattachine Society of Washington and the April 1965 White House picket.

=== Exhibition Themes ===
The exhibition is organized around ten themes, each representing a pivotal era in the history of LGBTQ Pride in DC:

1. “Picking our Battles and Reminding the Nation” (1965–1970) discusses how the Mattachine Society of Washington created an agenda for homosexual rights and freedoms before the Stonewall Riots of 1969.
2. “Gay and Proud” (1970–1975) details the period between 1970-1975 and how the fledgling gay liberation movement burst on the scenes after the Stonewall Riots, converging with the civil rights movement, women's liberation, and the anti-Vietnam movement.
3. “A Bookstore Blocks the Street: Gay Pride Day” (1975–1979) explores 1975 to 1979 and how the Lambda Rising Bookstore hosted Gay Pride Day Block Parties, initiating the annual Pride events in D.C.
4. “The Third World Conference Marches on Washington” (1979) discusses the activism and significant political organizing in the Black Lesbian and Gay community during the 1970s.
5. “Pride’s Day at the Beach” (1980–1987) details how the success of the 1970s block parties created the need for a new organizer, a new location, and a new threat to the community –the onset of the AIDS crisis.
6. “Dawn of a New Era of Pride Politics” (1987–1994) examines how fewer than a dozen picketers in the 1960s grew the political power to celebrate openness, address police brutality, and rally hundreds of thousands to demand federal action.
7. “Evolution of Visibility” (1989–1995) covers how by the 1990s victories from Gay Pride grew into more groups calling for more types of events to celebrate more identities under the rainbow.
8. “Freedom on America’s Main Streets” (1995–2003) discusses how during the 1990s the LGBTQ communities became more prominent across all areas of American life, the circumstances of moving official Pride activities to Pennsylvania Avenue, and the origin of the name “Capital Pride.”
9. “A New Alliance for a New Millennium” (2003–2020)
10. "A Vice-President Marches by Our Side" (2020–2025)

The exhibition features a visual timeline wall, “Hero Cubes” with archival photos and portraits of community pioneers, and over 50 days of public programming, including tours, panel discussions, and celebrations of Black, Latino, and Trans Pride.

=== Major Grants and Support ===
The Rainbow History Project's WorldPride exhibition and related programming are supported by several major grants, including:

- HumanitiesDC: Provided funding for the “Gay Pride in DC: 50 Years of Protests and Parties” exhibit.
- Events DC: Supported public programming and outreach.
- DC Commission on the Arts and Humanities: Provided project and operational support.
- Mayor’s Office of LGBTQ Affairs: Awarded a $15,000 grant for the Trans History Initiative, supporting expanded representation of trans histories in RHP programming.

== Archival materials and "Archives 101" sessions ==
The group began collecting archival materials from historic figures and using them for research and to create exhibits. One exhibit was “Pride: Party or Protest?,” Washington, D.C.’s first public exhibition of LGBTQ history; it examined the evolution of Capital Pride, Pride parades, and other celebrations in the nation's capital. The exhibit was held at the Charles Sumner School from January 13 through June 11, 2006.

By 2008 the collection was so large that a repository was sought, and a relationship was formed with the Historical Society of Washington, D.C. (now the DC History Center)--RHP solicits, processes and selectively digitizes materials; the Historical Society stores the materials and provides researcher access. Materials are available to the general public at the DC History Center and their descriptions can be reviewed in the online catalog.

As of 2025, RHP is still actively soliciting donations of archival materials.

== Social geography ==
Since 2001, RHP has tracked the local addresses of places and spaces of key importance to the DC-area LGBTQ communities. Their first public session on this research was at the September, 2001 “Lavender Languages Conference” at American University.

They continue to track these locations and solicit feedback.

By 2005, the social geography project had expanded into creating walking tours—both self-guided and in a group. In response to a lack of LGBTQ offerings through Cultural Tourism DC's walking tour program, RHP started to offer its own. They created tours on neighborhoods—Dupont Circle, Capitol Hill, and South Capitol Street—as well as affinity groups like African Americans, Women, and Drag. Guides can be downloaded directly from their website.

== Oral history activities ==
Since its very inception, RHP has recorded narratives about life in the LGBTQ communities of the greater metropolitan Washington, D.C. area. To date, they have several hundred recordings in their collection, and are actively recruiting volunteers to record and transcribe, and narrators to tell their stories.

== Community Pioneers ==
In 2003, the Rainbow History Project established the Community Pioneer Award to provide special recognition to individuals for their pioneering work in helping to create the gay, lesbian, bisexual, and transgender communities of metropolitan Washington, D.C.

Awards receptions are held every few years, when a new class is recognized. On October 21, 2009, 20 pioneers were recognized. In 2012, 14 pioneers were recognized, and the chair of RHP, Chuck Goldfarb, stated, ”If we’re not out there defining our community and history, there's always a danger of someone else defining it for us.” On May 14, 2015, at the Thurgood Marshall Center a dozen pioneers were recognized, including LGBTQ ally Annie Kaylor from Annie's Paramount Steakhouse fame. Due to coronavirus pandemic conditions, the Community Pioneers reception was postponed until late 2021 and held virtually. Recordings of that reception are available through the RHP YouTube page.

All LGBTQ community members and allies are invited to submit nominations for an award.

== Friends Radio ==
“Friends” was a radio program from 1973 until 1982 which was first on Georgetown University radio station, WGBT and later on Pacifica Radio, WPFW. Its name came from the 1973 hit song by Bette Midler, which was played at the start of each episode. Founded by Bruce Pennington and others from the Stonewall Nation Media Collective, it was one of the first and longest-running programs aimed at an LGBTQ audience. It chronicled the emerging gay community, as it established community organizations, sought civil rights, and dealt with issues like racism, gender, health and the arts. It was a social link in the early gay liberation days. In addition to news and community announcements, it included stories of people coming out, such as NFL football player Dave Kopay, and National LGBTQ Task Force founding director Bruce Voeller.

nitial work was done to use the tapes, digitize them, and share their recordings with the public. In 2015, RHP led a fundraising campaign to completely digitize all the holdings and make them available online. Certain recordings can be found within the Internet Archive RHP collection.

== Selected scholarship that uses RHP resources ==
- Baucom, Erin. “An Exploration into Archival Descriptions of LGBTQ Materials.” The American Archivist 81, no. 1 (2018): 65–83.
- Beemyn, Genny. A Queer Capital: A History of Gay Life in Washington D.C. United States: Taylor & Francis, 2014.
- Bost, Darius. "At the Club: Locating Early Black Gay AIDS Activism in Washington, DC." Occasion 8, (2015): 1–9.
- Bonds, Peter, "Stonewall on the Potomac: Gay political activism in Washington, DC, 1961-1973." MA thesis, James Madison University, 2016.
- Crawford-Lackey, Catherine, and Megan E. Springate. Preservation and Place: Historic Preservation by and of LGBTQ Communities in the United States. United States: Berghahn Books, 2019.
- Doetsch-Kidder, Sharon. Social Change and Intersectional Activism: The spirit of social movement. Palgrave MacMillan, 2012.
- Doetsch-Kidder, Sharon, and Ruby Bracamontes (Corado). “‘My Story Is Really Not Mine’: An Interview with Latina Trans Activist Ruby Bracamonte.” Feminist Studies 37, no. 2 (2011): 441–67.
- Dolinsky, Rebecca C.. Lesbian and Gay DC: Identity, Emotion, and Experience in Washington, DC's Social and Activist Communities (1961-1986). United States: University of California, Santa Cruz, 2010.
- Ghaziani, Amin, and Delia Baldassarri. “Cultural Anchors and the Organization of Differences: A Multi-method Analysis of LGBT Marches on Washington.” American Sociological Review 76, no. 2 (April 2011), pp. 179–206.
- Gomez, Letitia, Salvador Vidal-Ortiz, Uriel Quesada, editors. Queer Brown Voices: Personal Narratives of Latina/o LGBT Activism. United States: University of Texas Press, 2015.
- Holmes, Kwame A. "Chocolate to Rainbow City: the dialectics of black and gay community formation in postwar Washington, D.C., 1946-1978." PhD diss., University of Illinois, 2011.
- Holmes, Kwame. "What's the Tea: Gossip and the Production of Black Gay Social History." Radical History Review 122 (May 2015): 55–69.
- Peacock, Kent W. “Race, the Homosexual, and the Mattachine Society of Washington, 1961-1970.” Journal of the History of Sexuality 25, no. 2 (2016): 267–96.
- Romesburg, Don, editor. The Routledge History of Queer America. United Kingdom: Taylor & Francis, 2018.
- Valk, Anne M.. Radical sisters: second-wave feminism and Black liberation in Washington, D.C.. Urbana: University of Illinois Press, 2008.
- Vider, Stephen. The Queerness of Home: Gender, Sexuality, and the Politics of Domesticity After World War II. United States: University of Chicago Press, 2021.
- Wyatt-Nichol, Heather. “Sexual Orientation and Mental Health: Incremental Progression or Radical Change??” Journal of Health and Human Services Administration 37, no. 2 (2014): 225–41.
