= Keeler (surname) =

Keeler is a surname. Notable people with the surname include:

== People ==
- Anson F. Keeler, American politician in Connecticut
- Christine Keeler (1942–2017), British model and showgirl implicated in the Profumo affair
- Edwin O. Keeler (1846–1923), American banker and politician in Connecticut
- Ernest Keeler, American pioneer race car driver, participant in 1906 Vanderbilt Elimination Race
- Harry Stephen Keeler (1890–1967), American writer
- Jacqueline Keeler (fl. 2020s), Native American writer
- James Edward Keeler (1857–1900), American astronomer
- Jesse F. Keeler (born 1976), Canadian musician
- John Keeler (1654–1717), American politician in Connecticut
- John C. Keeler (1851–1899), American lawyer and politician from New York
- Ken Keeler (fl. from 1992), American comic writer
- Leonarde Keeler (1903–1949), American inventor of the polygraph
- Mary Keeler (1901–1997), American politician in Connecticut
- Ruby Keeler (1909–1993), Canadian and American actress, dancer, and singer
- Samuel Keeler (1656–1713), American politician in Connecticut
- Sarah Warren Keeler (1844-1899), American educator of the deaf-mute
- William H. Keeler (1931–2017), American cardinal of the Catholic Church
- W. W. Keeler (1908–1987), American engineer, oilman, and tribal chief
- Willie Keeler (1872–1923), American baseball player

== Fictional characters ==
- John Keeler, a character in 24

== See also ==
- Jennifer Keeler-Milne (born 1961), Australian artist
