= Metro Weekly =

Free weekly magazine in Washington, D.C.

- Cover of the May 7, 2020, issue
- Editor-in-chief: Randy Shulman
- Categories: Magazine
- Frequency: Weekly
- Publisher: Randy Shulman
- First issue: May 5, 1994
- Company: Jansi LLC
- Country: United States
- Based in: Washington, D.C.
- Language: English
- Website: metroweekly.com

Metro Weekly is a free weekly magazine for the lesbian, gay, bisexual, and transgender (LGBTQ) community in Washington, D.C., United States. It was first published on May 5, 1994. Metro Weekly includes national and local news, interviews with LGBT leaders and politicians, community event calendars, nightlife guides, and reviews of the District's arts and entertainment scene. The website's Scene section has archived over 100,000 original photos from Washington's LGBT community events. Published every Thursday with copies available for pick-up at 500 locations throughout the metropolitan area, Metro Weekly is read by more than 45,000 people in D.C., Maryland, and Virginia.

== Awards ==
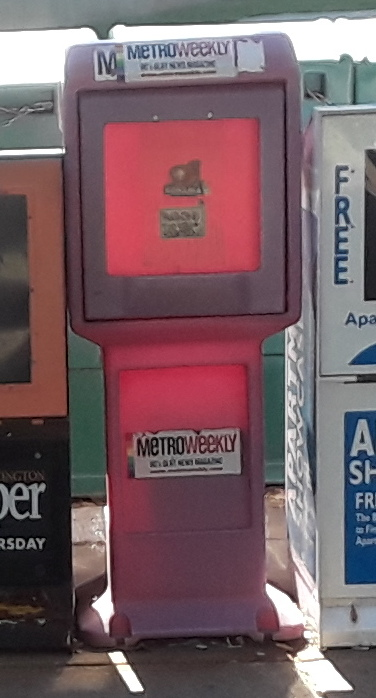
Metro Weekly dispenser at Huntington metro station

Metro Weekly and its publisher, Randy Shulman, received 18 ViceVersa Awards from the QSyndicate in 1998 which included Best News Interview or Personality Profile. In 2007, One In Ten gave an award to Metro Weekly as "the community’s event and entertainment bible, for their newspaper's consistent and enthusiastic support of lgbt arts."

In 2008 the magazine was honored for empowering the Asian/Pacific Islander GLBT community by Pride and Heritage. Co-publisher Sean Bugg was honored as a 2008 Capital Pride Hero, and co-publisher Randy Shulman was awarded Male Business Person of the Year by the Capital Area Gay and Lesbian Chamber of Commerce. He was also honored with a spot on Washington Life magazine's list of "The Power 100" for the magazine's media influence as the "nation’s largest LGBT arts publication."

In April 2009, Metro Weekly and Sean Bugg launched the magazine's own ceremony for the Next Generation Awards, a recognition of the efforts of LGBT activists under the age of 30. The awards are now part of the Next Generation Leadership Foundation.
