= Christopher Comstock =

American settler (1635–1702)

Deputy of the General Assembly of the Colony of Connecticut from Norwalk
- In office October 1686 – May 1687 Serving with John Platt
- Preceded by: John Platt, Samuel Hayes
- Succeeded by: Samuel Hayes
- In office May 1689 – October 1689
- Succeeded by: Samuel Hayes
- In office May 1690 – October 1690 Serving with Thomas Seamer
- Preceded by: Samuel Hayes
- Succeeded by: Samuel Smith

Personal details
- Born: October 7, 1635 Culmstock, Devon, England
- Died: December 8, 1702 (aged 67) Norwalk, Connecticut
- Spouse: Hannah Platt (m. October 6, 1663, Norwalk)
- Children: Mercy, Daniel, Hannah, Abigail, Mary, Elizabeth, Samuel Comstock, Nathan, Moses Comstock
- Occupation: tavernkeeper

Military service
- Rank: Sergeant

Coat of Arms of Christopher Comstock

Christopher Comstock (October 7, 1635 – December 8, 1702) was an early settler of Norwalk, Connecticut. He was a deputy of the General Assembly of the Colony of Connecticut from Norwalk in the sessions of October 1686, May 1689, and May 1690.

Comstock emigrated from England and originally settled in Fairfield in 1654.

On May 29, 1654, Comstock wrote an affidavit about his visiting with a woman named Knapp who was charged with witchcraft and who was later executed. On January 27, 1661, Comstock bought land from Thomas Betts. On September 19, 1692, he was part of the grand jury investigating witchcraft.

Comstock was nominated to be named a Freeman on October 10, 1667.

On October 14, 1686, he was a deputy to the General Court of the Colony of Connecticut. On January 16, 1694, he was appointed to a committee to obtain a minister for Norwalk.

== Notable descendants ==
- Anthony Comstock, 5th great-grandson
- Henry Comstock, 6th great-grandson

Preceded by Samuel Hayes; John Platt	Deputy of the General Assembly of the Colony of Connecticut from Norwalk; October 1686 – May 1687; With: John Platt	Succeeded by Samuel Hayes
Preceded by	Deputy of the General Assembly of the Colony of Connecticut from Norwalk; May 1689 – October 1689	Succeeded by Samuel Hayes
Preceded by Samuel Hayes	Deputy of the General Assembly of the Colony of Connecticut from Norwalk; May 1690 – October 1690; With: Thomas Seamer	Succeeded by Samuel Smith
