= Keisler =

Keisler is a surname. Notable people with the surname include:

- Howard Jerome Keisler (born 1936), American mathematician
- Peter Keisler (born 1960), American lawyer
- Randy Keisler (born 1976), American baseball pitcher

== See also ==
- Kesler
- Kiesler
