= Keeler =

Keeler may refer to:

== Places ==
- Keeler, Saskatchewan, Canada
- Keeler, California, US
- Keeler Township, Michigan, US
- Keeler (lunar crater), on the moon
- Keeler (Martian crater), crater on Mars
- Cape Keeler, in Antarctica

== Other uses ==
- Keeler (surname), including a list of people with the name
  - Christine Keeler (1942–2017), British model and showgirl implicated in the Profumo affair
- Keeler (play), 2013 play about the Profumo affair
- 2261 Keeler, an asteroid

== See also ==
- Keillor (surname), a surname
- Keiller (disambiguation), a surname
- Kieler (disambiguation)
- Garrison Keillor, of A Prairie Home Companion
