= John Belding =

American politician

Deputy of the General Assembly of the Colony of Connecticut from Norwalk
- In office October 1691 – May 1692 Serving with James Olmsted
- Preceded by: John Platt, Samuel Smith, Andrew Messenger
- Succeeded by: Samuel Hayes, Thomas Betts

Member of the House of Representatives of the Colony of Connecticut from Norwalk
- In office May 1705 – October 1705 Serving with Joseph Platt
- Preceded by: Thomas Betts, Samuel Keeler
- Succeeded by: Thomas Betts, Samuel Hanford

Personal details
- Born: January 9, 1650 Wethersfield, Connecticut Colony
- Died: November 26, 1713 (aged 63) Wethersfield, Connecticut Colony
- Spouse(s): Ruth Hayes (daughter of Samuel Hayes,
- Children: John, Jr., Samuel, Ruth (d. 1704, buried in East Norwalk Historical Cemetery), Ann Belding Bush
- Occupation: merchant

Military service
- Rank: Lieutenant
- Battles/wars: King Philip's War

John Belding (also recorded as John Beldon or John Belden) (January 9, 1650 – November 26, 1713) was an early settler of Norwalk, Connecticut. He was a member of the General Assembly of the Colony of Connecticut from Norwalk in the sessions of October 1691 and May 1705.

He was most likely the son of William Belding and Thomasine Sherwood, although at least one record shows his father as John Belding of Wethersfield. He was the brother of Daniel Belden, the early settler of Deerfield, Massachusetts.

He is recorded as living in Norwalk as early as 1673.

On April 30, 1690, he was appointed to a committee to fortify the meeting house.

On January 16, 1694, he was appointed to a committee to replace the deceased Reverend Thomas Hanford as minister for the town.

In 1708, he was one of the purchasers of Ridgefield, along with Matthew Seymour, Matthias St. John, and Samuel Keeler.

He died in 1713, and his widow, Ruth married John Copp, the town clerk.

== Notable descendants ==
- Grandfather of Thomas Belden, member of the Connecticut House of Representatives

Preceded by John Platt; Samuel Smith; Andrew Messenger	Deputy of the General Assembly of the Colony of Connecticut from Norwalk; October 1691–May 1692; With: James Olmsted	Succeeded by Samuel Hayes; Thomas Betts
Preceded by Thomas Betts; Samuel Keeler	Member of the House of Representatives of the Colony of Connecticut from Norwalk; May 1705–October 1705; With: Joseph Platt	Succeeded by Thomas Betts; Samuel Hanford
