= Keiller =

Keiller is a surname of Scottish origin. It is a variant of Keillor. It is also a given name.

Notable people with the surname include:

- Alexander Keiller (archaeologist) (1899–1955), Scottish archaeologist who worked at Avebury
  - Alexander Keiller Museum, Avebury
- Alexander Keiller (businessman) (1804–74), Scottish businessman who founded Göteborgs Mekaniska Verkstad
  - Keillers Park, Gothenburg, Sweden
- Alexander Keiller (physician) (1811–92), Scottish physician and obstetrician
- Bob Keiller, British businessman
- Gabrielle Keiller, Scottish golfer, art collector, archaeological photographer and heir to Keiller's marmalade
- John Keiller MacKay (1888–1970), Canadian soldier, lawyer and jurist
  - Keiller Mackay Collegiate Institute, Toronto
- Patrick Keiller (born 1950), British filmmaker, writer and lecturer
- Russell Keiller, Scottish curler and coach, European champion
- William Keiller, Scottish anatomist in the United States

Notable people with the given name include:

- Keiller Greig, British figure skater
- Keiller McCullough, Irish footballer
- Keiller da Silva Nunes (born 1996), Brazilian footballer
- Raymond Keiller Butchart, Scottish mathematician

== See also ==
- Alexander Keiller Museum, Avebury
- Keiller's marmalade, Scottish marmalade
- Keillor, surname
- Keeler (disambiguation), place or surname
