= Kaylor =

Kaylor is a surname of Scottish origin, a variant of Keillor. It is also an Americanized version of the German surname Köhler.

== People ==
- Annie Kaylor (1927–2013), American restaurateur and LGBT ally
- David Kaylor, professor of religion
- James Kaylor, British politician and trade unionist
- Jimmie Kaylor, American football player
- Joe Kaylor, American handball player
- Mark Kaylor (1961–2025), British boxer
- Robert Kaylor, American director and screenwriter

== Places ==
- Kaylor, Pennsylvania
- Kaylor, South Dakota

== Other uses ==
- Kaylor, a name used by Gaylors for the supposed romantic relationship between Taylor Swift and Karlie Kloss
