= John Platt (settler) =

Settler of Norwalk, Connecticut (1632–1705)

Deputy of General Assembly of the Colony of Connecticut from Norwalk
- In office October 1678 – May 1679 Serving with Mark Sension
- Preceded by: Walter Hoyt, John Bowton
- Succeeded by: Richard Olmsted, John Gregory
- In office October 1680 – May 1681 Serving with John Gregory
- Preceded by: Daniel Kellogg, John Bowton
- Succeeded by: John Gregory, John Bowton
- In office October 1681 – May 1687 Serving with Walter Hoyt, John Bowton, Mark Sension, Samuel Hayes, Christopher Comstock
- Preceded by: John Gregory, John Bowton
- Succeeded by: Samuel Hayes
- In office May 1691 – October 1691 Serving with Samuel Smith, Andrew Messenger
- Succeeded by: John Belding, James Olmsted
- In office October 1692 – May 1693 Serving with James Olmsted
- Preceded by: Samuel Hayes, Thomas Betts
- Succeeded by: Samuel Betts, Samuel Hayes
- In office October 1694 – May 1695 Serving with Thomas Betts
- Preceded by: Samuel Hayes, Matthew Marvin, Jr.
- Succeeded by: Samuel Hayes, Jakin Gregory

Personal details
- Born: January 11, 1632 Ware, Hertfordshire, England
- Died: November 6, 1705 Norwalk, Connecticut
- Spouse: Hannah Clark
- Children: John Platt, Josiah Platt, Samuel Platt, Joseph Platt, Hannah Platt Marvin (m. Samuel Marvin), Sarah Platt Kellogg (m. Samuel Kellogg), Mary Platt Benedict, and Nancy Platt
- Occupation: deacon, husbandman

Military service
- Rank: sergeant
- Unit: Norwalk Trainband

John Platt (January 11, 1632 – November 6, 1705) was an early settler of Norwalk, Connecticut. He was a member of the General Court of the Colony of Connecticut from Norwalk in several sessions between 1678 and 1694.

Platt was the son of Richard Platt and Mary Wood. He moved from Milford, Connecticut to Norwalk, and received grants of land there in 1660, 1663 and 1672. He was a deacon of the church at Norwalk and sergeant of the Norwalk Train Band.

In 1680, Platt was one of the three commissioners appointed to lay out the plantation north of Stamford. In 1687, he was appointed one of the three commissioners chosen to lay out Danbury.

Preceded by Walter Hoyt; John Bowton	Deputy of the General Assembly of the Colony of Connecticut from Norwalk; October 1678–May 1679; With: Mark Sension	Succeeded by Richard Olmsted; John Gregory
Preceded by Daniel Kellogg; John Bowton	Deputy of the General Assembly of the Colony of Connecticut from Norwalk; October 1680–May 1681; With: John Gregory	Succeeded by John Gregory; John Bowton
Preceded by John Gregory; John Bowton	Deputy of the General Assembly of the Colony of Connecticut from Norwalk; October 1681–May 1687; With: Walter Hoyt, Walter Hoyt, John Bowton, Mark Sension, Samuel Hayes, Christopher Comstock	Succeeded by Samuel Hayes
Preceded by	Deputy of the General Assembly of the Colony of Connecticut from Norwalk; May 1691–October 1691; With: Samuel Smith, Andrew Messenger	Succeeded by John Belding; James Olmsted
Preceded by Samuel Hayes; Thomas Betts	Deputy of the General Assembly of the Colony of Connecticut from Norwalk; October 1692–May 1693; With: James Olmsted	Succeeded by Samuel Betts; Samuel Hayes
Preceded by Samuel Hayes; Matthew Marvin, Jr.	Deputy of the General Assembly of the Colony of Connecticut from Norwalk; October 1694–May 1695; With: Thomas Betts	Succeeded by Samuel Hayes; Jakin Gregory
