= Reel Affirmations =

LGBTQ film festival held in Washington D.C.

- Cover of the Reel Affirmations 17 program guide.
- Established: 1991

Reel Affirmations (RA) is a non-profit, all-volunteer LGBT film festival in Washington, D.C. Founded in 1991 and held every year in mid-October, as of 2011 Reel Affirmations was one of the largest LGBT film festivals (in terms of attendance) in the United States. Baltimore's Gay Life newspaper called it "one of the top three films festivals for the entire LGBT community." A 2007 guidebook claims it was one of the largest LGBT film festivals in the world. A listing of LGBT film festivals claims it is the largest all-volunteer film festival in the world.

== Organization ==
Reel Affirmations is a program of One In Ten, a Washington, D.C.–based LGBT non-profit arts organization. One In Ten is overseen by a board of four officers and nine board members. Until 2009, a full-time, paid executive director oversaw the day-to-day operations of the organization. But as of 2011, its operations were run by the board and three volunteer directors. All One In Ten programs, including Reel Affirmations, are conceived, organized, and implemented by volunteers.

Planning for Reel Affirmations begins after the conclusion of each year's festival. Deposits are placed to secure venues, and corporate sponsors are secured (an ongoing process which lasts until August). Programming teams for feature films, women's shorts, men's shorts, and documentaries begin researching and screening films in February. Films are secured by contract beginning as early as May, although most contracts are not finalized until early July. A coordinating committee oversees implementation of VIP relations, hospitality, volunteer coordination, marketing, embassy relations, public relations, and other aspects of the film festival.

Most funding for Reel Affirmations comes from corporate sponsorships and ticket sales. Additional support comes from grants provided by the D.C. city government.

Reel Affirmations previously sponsored a two-day film festival which coincided with Capital Pride. The program began sponsoring monthly film screenings titled RA Xtra beginning in 2000, but stopped these events after RA15 in 2005. RA Xtra resumed in November 2010. The organization also formerly sponsored "Divas Outdoors", a two-movie outdoor screening of classic gay-related movies at Hillwood Estate, Museum & Gardens, the former home of Marjorie Merriweather Post (heiress to the Post cereal fortune).

== History ==
=== Early years ===
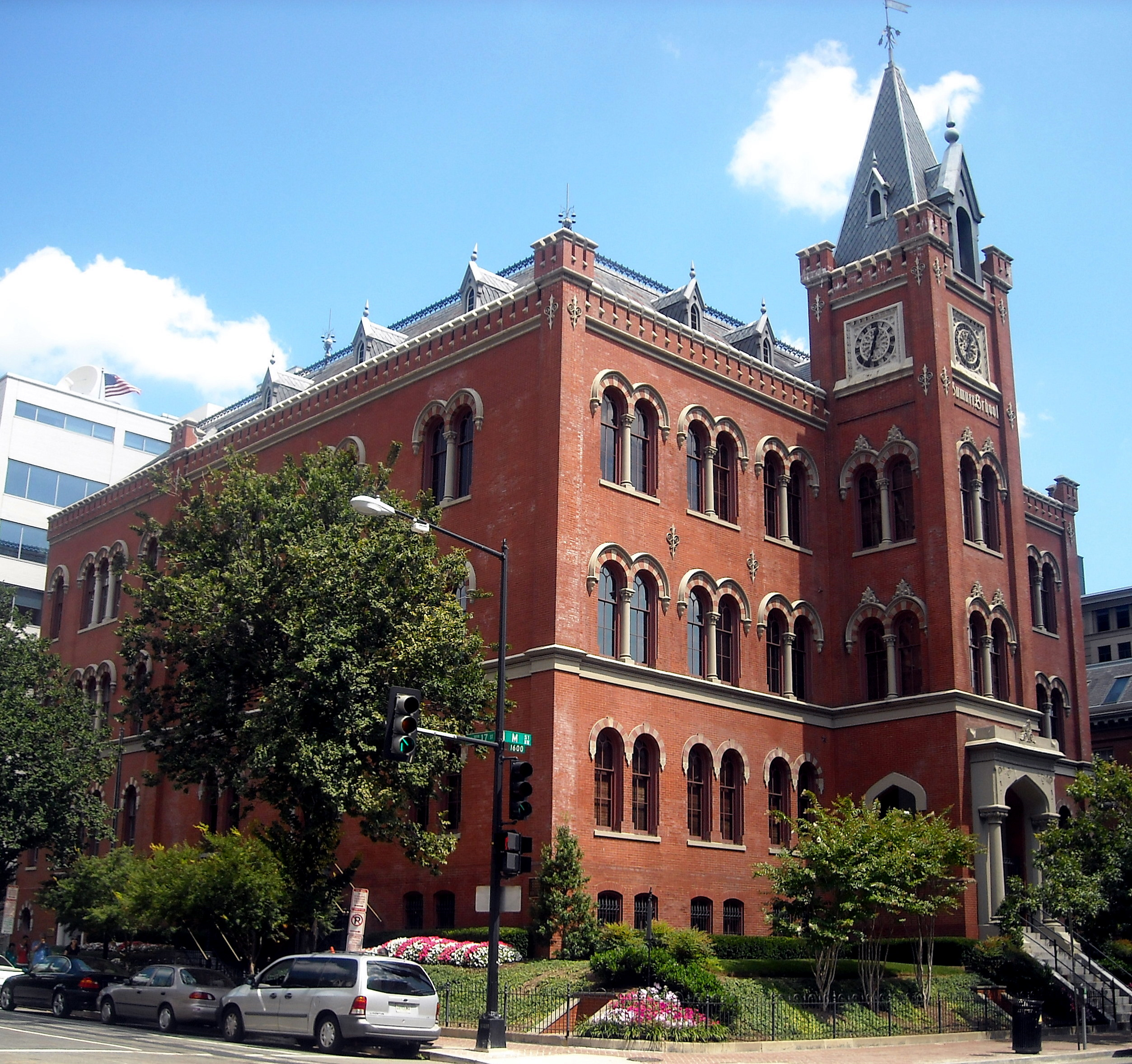
Charles Sumner School, a venue during the 1993 Reel Affirmations film festival (RA3).

Reel Affirmations was co-founded by Barry Becker, Mark Betchkal, Matthew Cibellis and Keith Clark, gay residents of Washington, D.C., who wished to found a gay arts organization. They began meeting in 1990, and founded the LGBT arts organization One In Ten, with Reel Affirmations as the organization's first program. The four sought the advice and input of Frameline, then the largest LGBT gay film festival in the U.S. With financial and administrative assistance from Frameline, the first Reel Affirmations film festival opened on October 11, 1991. The first festival venue was the Biograph Theater in Georgetown. The 10-day festival screened 62 feature films, short subjects and documentaries to 2,500 attendees. The opening night film was My Father Is Coming, and the closing night film was Together Alone.

In 1992, the festival expanded to screen its opening night film at the Cineplex Odeon Embassy Theatre in the District. Author Armistead Maupin opened the festival. RA2 screened 76 short and feature-length works shown at the Biograph.

The following year, the festival screened 24 features and 44 shorts and added screenings at the Goethe-Institut and Charles Sumner School. With the film festival on firm financial footing, Frameline did not provide administrative and financial support for RA3.

The festival continued to expand in 1994, screening 130 films and dropping smaller venues (Biograph, Sumner School) while adding larger ones (such as the West End 1-4 cinema). The festival also conducted a screening at the Hirshhorn Museum and Sculpture Garden—one of the first gay events to be held in a federal building. 1994 was also the year the festival scored its first U.S premiere.

By its fifth anniversary in 1995, Reel Affirmations was the fourth-largest LGBT film festival in the United States in attendance, with more than 12,000 attendees. Although the festival screened only 102 films that year, it expanded to a fifth large venue (the AMC Courthouse Theatre in Virginia). A year later, it dropped two of its smaller venues in favor of the 275-seat Goldman Theatre in the D.C. Jewish Community Center in Dupont Circle.

=== Lincoln Theatre years ===
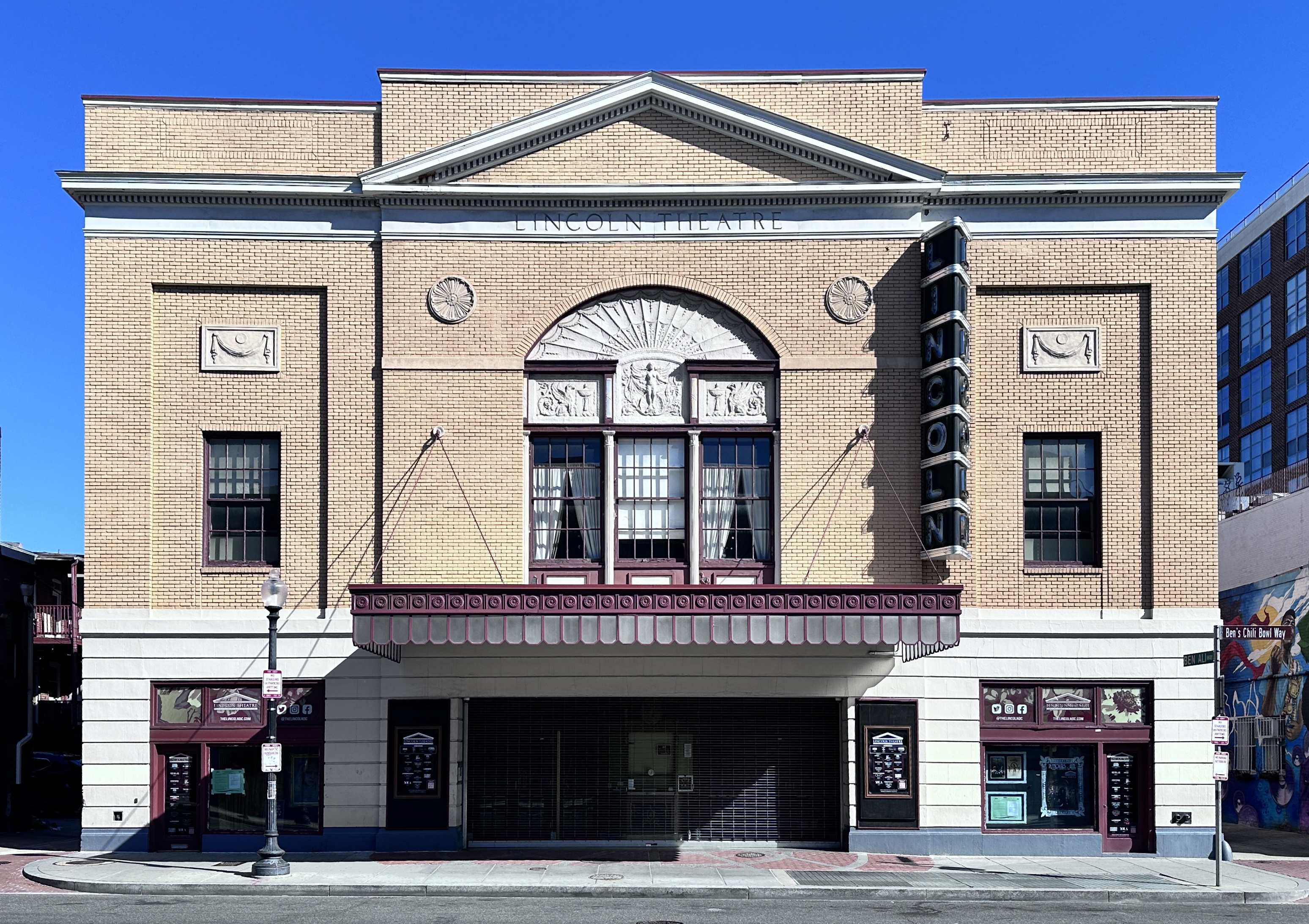
The Lincoln Theatre in Washington, D.C., Reel Affirmations' primary venue between 1998 and 2008.

Reel Affirmations' growth led it to move out of the Cineplex Odeon Embassy and West End theaters in 1998. The film fest moved into the 1,200-seat historic Lincoln Theatre located near U and 14th Streets, N.W. RA8 screened more than 140 feature films, shorts and documentaries at the two venues.

1999 was a turning point for Reel Affirmations. Several years of declining attendance by women led festival director Sarah Kellogg to create a special women's program. The event, known as the Women Filmmakers Brunch, has continued ever since and features women filmmakers, screenings, and a discussion of films with particular appeal to women. RA9 also was the only LGBT film festival of the season to screen Boys Don't Cry. The award-winning film debuted in New York City, screened at Reel Affirmations, and then opened in theaters nationwide.

In honor of the festival's continuing success, the Gay and Lesbian Activists Alliance bestowed its 2004 Distinguished Service Award on Reel Affirmations festival director Sarah Kellogg. In 2006, RA 16 screened more than 100 movies to more than 30,000 attendees during its 10-day run.

=== Post-2008 festival ===
In 2008, in addition to the Lincoln Theatre, the film festival used several locations including the Goethe-Institut, Sixth & I Synagogue, and Landmark E Street Cinema (all in Washington, D.C.), as well as the AFI Silver theater in Silver Spring, Maryland.

In 2009, Reel Affirmations struck a relationship with the Shakespeare Theatre Company. The film festival did not use the Lincoln Theatre, holding its larger film screenings at the company's Sidney Harman Hall. Festival executive director Margaret Murray left in November 2009 after four years as RA head—leaving the festival with about $40,000 in debt. According to the Washington Blade, an LGBTQ newspaper in D.C., a number of factors were responsible for the debt: A diminishing number of corporate sponsors, the timing of Murray's resignation (just as donor recruitment was beginning for the following year), lack of preparation by RA for Murray's departure, an increasing number of popular LGBTQ events competing with the festival in October, fewer advertisers in the festival's program booklet, poor weather during several days of the 2009 festival, discontinuation of the festival's VIP program (which left it dependent on single ticket sales), and a heavy drop in single ticket sales. Many board members left the organization, new board members were recruited, and three volunteers took over RA's day-to-day operations.

In July 2010, RA organizers announced that the film festival would move from October 2010 to April 2011 because of funding shortfalls. One news source reported that RA organizers had intended to hold an October film festival, but a community fundraiser brought in only $5,000—far less than hoped, and not enough to allow an October festival to occur. The move to April was prompted, in part, by the hope that a $75,000 D.C. government grant would allow the festival to occur. However, on March 8, 2011, RA officials cancelled the April event because of continuing heavy debt and because several grants had not been awarded to the organization. Festival organizers scheduled the 20th Reel Affirmations LGBTQ film festival for October 13–22, 2011.

Additional changes occurred during the 20th film festival. The film festival no longer held events at the Shakespeare Theatre Company. The primary film festival venue was Lisner Auditorium at George Washington University (GWU). Other venues included GWU's Documentary Center, GWU's Marvin Center Amphitheatre, Atlas Performing Arts Center, the FHI 360 Globe Theater, and the West End Cinema (one of the original venues for the film festival in the early 1990s). The festival also instituted an "Embassy Screening Series," in which LGBTQ films from a specific country were screened at that nation's embassy in Washington, D.C. Screenings occurred at the Embassy of Israel and Embassy of France, and by the Embassy of Germany at the Goethe-Institut. The Women and Filmmakers' Brunch continued to be held, although the venue was now the U.S. Navy Memorial Heritage Center's Arleigh Burke Theater. Festival volunteer coordinator Mark Heckathorn estimated that the festival would draw 20,000 attendees in 2011.

Reel Affirmations continued to recover from its financial crisis in 2012. In March 2012, it held an "Oscar Party" (with muscular men covered in gold welcoming patrons) in which the public was invited to view the Academy Awards in a gay-friendly setting. Reel Affirmations hosted a truncated four-day festival (November 1–4) in 2012. Once more, its venues changed. The festival returned to its long-time venue at the D.C. Jewish Community Center and the Goethe Institut as well as its RA Xtra venue at the Carnegie Institution for Science.

=== End of annual festival ===
Reel Affirmations ceased to offer an annual film festival at the conclusion of the 2012 event. One In Ten turned the Reel Affirmations program over to The DC Center, a nonprofit organization offering several different programs to the local LGBTQ community. The DC Center reestablished the RA Xtra program of monthly film screenings, which it offered beginning in 2015.

Reel Affirmations planned a three-day film festival for August 28–30, 2015, at the Gala Hispanic/Tivoli Theatre.

== Awards ==
Reel Affirmations presents four major awards each year. Each award is bestowed based on audience balloting. Honors are given for Best Feature, Best Documentary, Best Male Short, and Best Female Short. Beginning in 2011, Reel Affirmations added two new awards. These included a First Time Director and a Best International Movie award.

Reel Affirmations formerly distributed a Plant-A-Seed filmmaker grant at the end of each festival. The grant was established in 2000. It was supported by audience donations and a silent auction held throughout each year's festival, and varied in amount from year to year. The grant was awarded by the One In Ten board to a filmmaker or filmmakers who had previously produced a feature film, short or documentary, and was intended to help the filmmaker complete a current work in progress. This grant was discontinued in 2008. The festival re-established its filmmaker's grant award in 2011, renaming it the Keith Clark & Barry Becker Filmmaker Award (in honor of the co-founders of the festival).

== Bibliography ==
- Dickey, Jeff. The Rough Guide to Washington, D.C. London: Rough Guides, 2011.
- Yenckel, Jim and Frommer, Pauline. Pauline Frommer's Washington D.C. Hoboken, N.J.: Wiley, 2007.
