= Andrew Messenger =

American politician

Deputy of the General Assembly of the Colony of Connecticut from Norwalk
- In office May 1691 – October 1691 Serving with John Platt, Samuel Smith
- Succeeded by: John Belding, James Olmsted

Member of the Connecticut House of Representatives from Norwalk
- In office October 1696 – May 1697
- Preceded by: Samuel Hayes
- Succeeded by: Samuel Hayes, Matthew Marvin, Jr.
- In office October 1700 – May 1701
- Preceded by: Samuel Hayes
- Succeeded by: Samuel Hayes
- In office October 1701 – October 1702 Serving with Samuel Keeler
- Preceded by: Samuel Hayes
- Succeeded by: Samuel Hayes

Personal details
- Born: 1650 Jamaica, Long Island, New York
- Died: October 1730 Jamaica, Long Island, New York
- Spouse(s): Rebecca Pickett (m. 1685, widow of James St. John), Rachel Hayes(daughter of Nathaniel Haies)
- Children: Mary Messenger Benedict
- Occupation: surveyor

Military service
- Rank: sergeant

Andrew Messenger (1650 – October 1730) was a deputy of the General Assembly of the Colony of Connecticut from Norwalk in the sessions of May 1691, and October 1696, and a member of the Connecticut House of Representatives in the sessions of October 1700, October 1701, and May 1702.

He was the son of Andrew Messenger and Rachel Manning.

On June 28, 1686, he bought the land of Walter Hoyt.

On December 5, 1694, Messenger was elected by the town of Norwalk, to serve as collector of each townsman's proportion (tax) to pay the minister for his services.

In 1698, it was the special duty of Messenger and John Keeler, as deputies to bring the enforcement of the Game Law to the attention of the native people of the Norwalk area, who had been assigned to the portion of Chestnut Hill called Indian Field.

Preceded by	Deputy of the General Court of the Colony of Connecticut from Norwalk; May 1691–October 1691; With: Samuel Smith; John Platt	Succeeded by John Belding; James Olmsted
Preceded by Samuel Hayes	Deputy of the General Assembly of the Colony of Connecticut from Norwalk; October 1696–May 1697	Succeeded by Samuel Hayes; Matthew Marvin, Jr.
Preceded by Samuel Hayes	Member of the House of Representatives of the Colony of Connecticut from Norwalk; October 1700–May 1701	Succeeded by Samuel Hayes
Preceded by Samuel Hayes	Member of the House of Representatives of the Colony of Connecticut from Norwalk; October 1701–October 1702; With: Samuel Keeler	Succeeded by Samuel Hayes
