= Annie's Paramount Steakhouse =

Restaurant in Washington, D.C., U.S.

Annie's Paramount Steakhosue
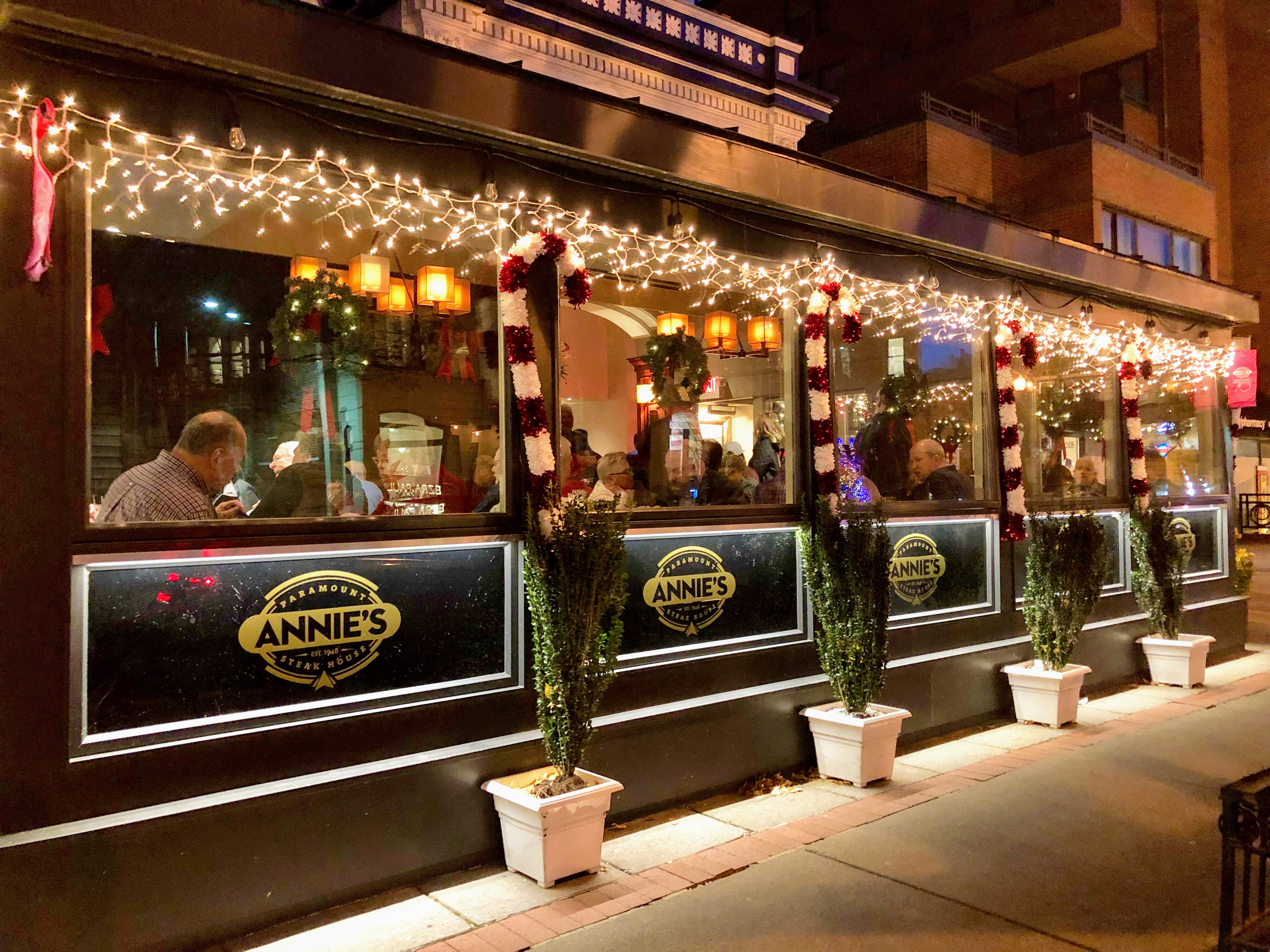
- Annie's Paramount Steakhouse at its current location
- Interactive map of Annie's Paramount Steakhosue

Restaurant information
- Established: 1948; 78 years ago
- Location: Washington, D.C.
- Coordinates: 38.91279328367443°N 77.03476842346102°W
- Website: www.anniesparamountdc.com

Annie's Paramount Steakhouse, also known as Annie's, is a restaurant in Washington, D.C., known for its role in the city's LGBT culture.

== History ==
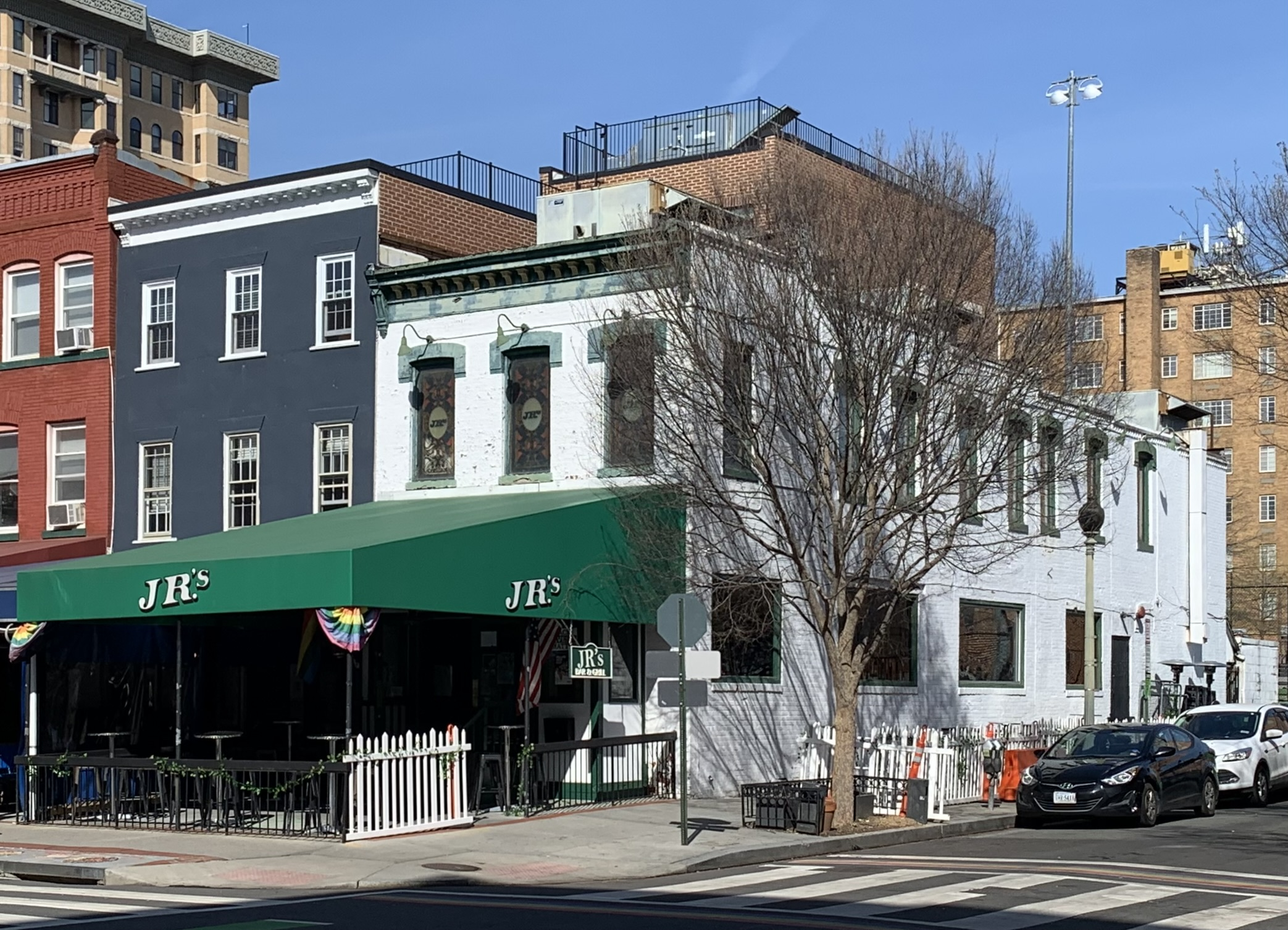
Former location of Annie's Paramount Steakhouse from 1948 to 1985, now JR's Bar & Grill

George Katinas opened the Paramount Steakhouse in 1948, at 1519 17th Street NW, in the Dupont Circle neighborhood of Washington, D.C. It was originally considered a "beer joint" but later became better known as a full service restaurant, with an all-women waitstaff.

Katinas's sisters, Annie Kaylor and Sue Stouts, began working at the restaurant's bar in 1952 and 1953 respectively, during night and weekend shifts.

Shortly after opening, gay men from the surrounding neighborhood began to frequent the restaurant. While Katinas, Kaylor, and Stouts were not initially aware that many of their customers were gay, the restaurant welcomed a diverse set of customers. Kaylor was described as "a mother to all of us," who once encouraged two men to hold hands visibly, rather than hiding under the table.

In the early 1960s, Katinas renamed the restaurant to "Annie's Paramount Steakhouse" and had his sister serve as the face of the establishment.

Following the 1968 riots in Washington, many businesses on 17th Street were damaged or closed, but the gay community continued to patronize Annie's, keeping the restaurant in business.

In 1974, the restaurant hired its first male waiter, Mano, and the restaurant continued to support the local gay community as the gay rights movement grew following the 1969 Stonewall riots in New York City, and during the AIDS crisis. A 1981 Washington Post column by Michael Kernan described Annie's as a place where "many of the gay guys who live in the neighborhood (and elsewhere) swarm in, mixing peacefully with straight couples."

The restaurant moved to its current location, 1609 17th Street NW, in 1985.

On August 23, 2004, Adrien Almstad, a waiter at the restaurant, was shot and killed as he walked home.

Kaylor worked at the bar until around 2010, but continued making occasional visits until her death in 2013.

The James Beard Foundation awarded Annie's a Classics Award in 2019, noting its longtime support of the LGBTQ community.

As of 2021, Georgia Katinas, George Katinas’s granddaughter, serves as general manager, and the restaurant is still owned by the Katinas family.

== Role in local LGBT culture ==
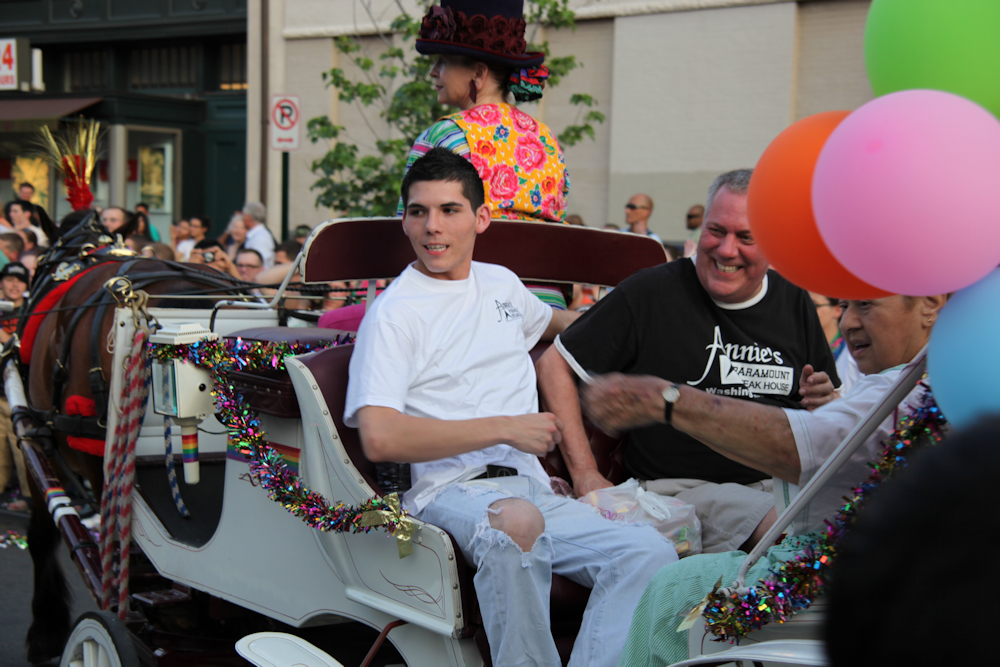
Kitchen staff, wait staff, and hosts from Annie's ride in an open carriage at the 2009 D.C. Capital Pride parade

In addition to its predominantly gay clientele, Annie's Paramount Steakhouse has more formally supported the LGBT community in Washington, D.C. The restaurant has sponsored the Gay Men's Chorus of Washington, D.C. and has a contingency in the Capital Pride parade. The restaurant has hosted same-sex weddings since same-sex marriage became legal in the District in 2010.

In 2015, D.C.'s Rainbow History Project posthumously recognized Kaylor as an LGBT community ally.
