= Matthew Marvin Jr. =

Founding settler of both Hartford, Connecticut, and Norwalk, Connecticut

Deputy of the General Assembly of the Colony of Connecticut from Norwalk
- In office May 1694 – October 1694 Serving with Samuel Hayes
- Preceded by: Samuel Hayes, James Olmsted
- Succeeded by: John Platt, Thomas Betts
- In office May 1697 – May 1698 Serving with Samuel Hayes
- Preceded by: Andrew Messenger
- Succeeded by: Samuel Hayes

Personal details
- Born: Baptized November 8, 1626 Great Bentley, Essex, England
- Died: 1712 Norwalk, Connecticut Colony
- Spouse(s): Mary Brush, Alice Kellogg
- Children: Sarah Marvin Betts, Matthew Marvin, Samuel Marvin, Hannah Marvin, Elizabeth Marvin Platt, John Marvin

Matthew Marvin Jr. (bapt. November 8, 1626 – 1712) was a founding settler of both Hartford and Norwalk, Connecticut. He served as a deputy of the General Assembly of the Colony of Connecticut from Norwalk in the sessions of May 1694, and May and October 1697.

He was the son of Matthew Marvin Sr. and Elizabeth.

He was twenty-four years old when he settled at Norwalk.

He is listed on the Founders Stone bearing the names of the founding settlers of Norwalk in the East Norwalk Historical Cemetery.

Preceded by Samuel Hayes; James Olmsted	Deputy of the General Assembly of the Colony of Connecticut from Norwalk; May 1694 – October 1694; With: Samuel Hayes	Succeeded by John Platt; Thomas Betts
Preceded by Andrew Messenger	Deputy of the General Assembly of the Colony of Connecticut from Norwalk; May 1697 – May 1698; With: Samuel Hayes	Succeeded by Samuel Hayes
