= Samuel Hayes (settler) =

Early settler of Norwalk, Connecticut

Deputy of the General Assembly of the Colony of Connecticut from Norwalk
- In office 1686–1703
- Preceded by: John Platt
- Succeeded by: Samuel Keeler

Personal details
- Born: 1641 Hartford County, Connecticut Colony
- Died: April 7, 1712 Norwalk, Connecticut Colony
- Resting place: East Norwalk Historical Cemetery, Norwalk, Connecticut
- Spouse: Elizabeth Moore (m. 1672)
- Children: Sarah Hayes Seymour (m. Matthew Seymour), Ruth Hayes Belding (m. John Belding), Ann Hayes, Isaac Hayes

Samuel Hayes (1641 – April 7, 1712) was an early settler of Norwalk, Connecticut. He was a member of the General Assembly of the Colony of Connecticut from Norwalk in the sessions of May 1686, May and October 1687, October 1689, May 1692, May and October 1693, May 1694, May 1695, May 1696, May and October 1697, May and October 1698, October 1699, May 1700, May 1701, October 1702, and October 1703.

He was the son of Nathaniel Hayes (born 1614), and the brother of Nathaniel Hayes, one of the original settlers of Norwalk.

He married Elizabeth Moore, the daughter of Isaac Moore.

Preceded by John Bowton; John Platt	Deputy of the General Assembly of the Colony of Connecticut from Norwalk; May 1686–October 1686; With: John Platt	Succeeded by Christopher Comstock
Preceded by John Platt; Christopher Comstock	Deputy of the General Assembly of the Colony of Connecticut from Norwalk; May 1687–May 1688	Succeeded by
Preceded by Christopher Comstock	Deputy of the General Assembly of the Colony of Connecticut from Norwalk; October 1689–May 1690	Succeeded by Christopher Comstock; Thomas Seamer
Preceded by John Belding; James Olmsted	Deputy of the General Assembly of the Colony of Connecticut from Norwalk; May 1692–October 1692; With: Thomas Betts	Succeeded by James Olmsted; John Platt
Preceded by James Olmsted; John Platt	Deputy of the General Assembly of the Colony of Connecticut from Norwalk; May 1693–October 1694; With: Samuel Betts; James Olmsted; Matthew Marvin, Jr.	Succeeded by John Platt; Thomas Betts
Preceded by John Platt; Thomas Betts	Deputy of the General Assembly of the Colony of Connecticut from Norwalk; May 1695–October 1695; With: Jakin Gregory	Succeeded by John Gregory
Preceded by John Gregory	Deputy of the General Assembly of the Colony of Connecticut from Norwalk; May 1696–October 1696	Succeeded by Andrew Messenger
Preceded by Andrew Messenger	Deputy of the General Assembly of the Colony of Connecticut from Norwalk; May 1697–May 1699; With: Matthew Marvin, Jr. John Keeler	Succeeded by James Olmsted
Preceded by James Olmsted	Member of the House of Representatives of the Colony of Connecticut from Norwalk; October 1699–October 1700	Succeeded by Andrew Messenger
Preceded by Andrew Messenger	Member of the House of Representatives of the Colony of Connecticut from Norwalk; May 1701–October 1701	Succeeded by Andrew Messenger; Samuel Keeler
Preceded by Andrew Messenger	Member of the House of Representatives of the Colony of Connecticut from Norwalk; October 1702–May 1703	Succeeded by
Preceded by	Member of the House of Representatives of the Colony of Connecticut from Norwalk; October 1703–May 1704; With: Samuel Keeler	Succeeded by Thomas Betts; Samuel Keeler
