= James Olmsted =

American politician (1645–1731)

Deputy of the General Assembly of the Colony of Connecticut from Norwalk
- In office October 1691 – May 1692 Serving with John Belding
- Preceded by: Samuel Smith, Andrew Messenger
- Succeeded by: Samuel Hayes, Thomas Betts

Member of the Connecticut House of Representatives from Norwalk
- In office October 1692 – May 1693 Serving with John Platt
- Preceded by: Samuel Hayes, Thomas Betts
- Succeeded by: Samuel Hayes, Samuel Betts
- In office October 1693 – May 1694 Serving with Samuel Hayes
- Preceded by: Samuel Betts, Samuel Hayes
- Succeeded by: Samuel Hayes, Matthew Marvin, Jr.
- In office May 1699 – October 1699
- Preceded by: Samuel Hayes, John Keeler
- Succeeded by: Samuel Hayes

Personal details
- Born: April 17, 1645 Hartford, Connecticut Colony
- Died: April 28, 1731 Norwalk, Connecticut Colony
- Spouse: Phebe Barlow (m. May 1, 1673)
- Children: James Olmsted, Joseph Olmsted, Nathan Olmsted, Samuel Olmsted, John Olmsted

Military service
- Rank: Captain

James Olmsted (April 17, 1645 – April 28, 1731) was an early settler of Norwalk, Connecticut. He was a deputy of the General Assembly of the Colony of Connecticut from Norwalk in the sessions of October 1691, October 1692, October 1693, and May 1699.

He was the son of founding settler of Norwalk, Richard Olmsted and Elizabeth Haugh Olmsted.

He served as town clerk of Norwalk for 29 years, from 1678 to 1707 and again in 1721.

He was town judge.

In 1671, and from 1682 to 1685, he was chosen as a selectman.

Preceded by Samuel Smith; Andrew Messenger	Deputy of the General Assembly of the Colony of Connecticut from Norwalk; October 1691–May 1692; With: John Belding	Succeeded by Samuel Hayes; Thomas Betts
Preceded by Samuel Hayes; Thomas Betts	Deputy of the General Assembly of the Colony of Connecticut from Norwalk; October 1692–May 1693; With: John Platt	Succeeded by Samuel Hayes; Samuel Betts
Preceded by Samuel Hayes; Samuel Betts	Deputy of the General Assembly of the Colony of Connecticut from Norwalk; October 1693–May 1694; With: Samuel Hayes	Succeeded by Samuel Hayes; Matthew Marvin, Jr.
Preceded by Samuel Hayes; John Keeler	Member of the House of Representatives of the Colony of Connecticut from Norwalk; May 1699–October 1699	Succeeded by Samuel Hayes
