= Thomas Seamer =

Deputy of the General Assembly of the Connecticut Colony from Norwalk
- In office May 1690 – October 1790 Serving with Christopher Comstock
- Preceded by: Samuel Hayes
- Succeeded by: Samuel Smith

Personal details
- Born: July 15, 1632 Sawbridgeworth, Hertfordshire, England
- Died: October 1712 (aged 80)
- Spouse(s): Hannah Marvin, daughter of Matthew Marvin, Sr. (m. January 1653), Sarah Wildman, Elizabeth Betts (daughter of Thomas Betts)
- Children: Hannah Seamer (b. December 12, 1654), Abigail Seamer Picket (b. January 1655), Mary Seamer (b. September 1658), Sarah Seamer,(b. September 1658), Thomas Seamer (b. September 1660), Mercie Seamer (b. November 1666), Matthew Seymour (b. May 1669), Elizabeth Seamer (December 1673), Rebecka Seamer (b. January 1675)

Thomas Seamer (also Seymour) (July 15, 1632 – 1712) was a founding settler of Norwalk, Connecticut, modern day United States. He served as a deputy of the General Assembly of the Connecticut Colony from Norwalk in the May 1690 session.

He was the son of Captain Richard Seamer and Mercy Ruscoe, who were founding settlers of Hartford. Thomas came to New England with his parents about 1638, at the age of six. He lived in Hartford until about 1651, when he moved to Norwalk with his parents. In 1655, his father died, and he was the only one among his siblings who was of age. His mother soon remarried and removed to Farmington with her younger children. Thomas inherited his father's lands in Norwalk, where he lived until his death.

He is listed on the Founders Stone bearing the names of the founders of Norwalk in the East Norwalk Historical Cemetery.
