= Caylor =

Caylor is a surname of Scottish origin. It is a variant of Keillor. Notable people with the surname include:

- Dulcy Caylor (born 2007), American artistic gymnast
- Lowell Caylor, American football player
- O. P. Caylor (1849–1897), American baseball columnist, executive, and manager
- Rose Caylor (1898–1979), Russian-American screenwriter, playwright, actress, and journalist

== See also ==
- Caylor, Virginia, an unincorporated community in Lee County
