= Kieler =

Kieler may refer to:

- Jørgen Kieler (1919–2017), Danish physician, participated in resistance activities under the German occupation of Denmark
- Laura Kieler (1849–1932), Norwegian-Danish novelist
- Kieler, Wisconsin, unincorporated community in the Town of Jamestown in Grant County, Wisconsin
- Kieler Nachrichten (literally "Kiel News") or KN is the only German language newspaper published in Kiel, Germany
- Kieler Yacht-Club or Kiel Yacht Club (as it is called in English), one of the oldest yacht clubs in Germany

== See also ==
- Keeler (disambiguation)
- Kiesler
