= Kiesler =

Kiesler is a surname. Notable people with the surname include:

- Brigitte Kiesler (1924–2013), German gymnast
- Charles Kiesler (1934–2002), American psychologist and university administrator
- Frederick John Kiesler (1890–1965), Austrian-American architect
- Kenneth Kiesler (born 1953), American symphony orchestra and opera conductor
- Sara Kiesler, computer scientist
- Hedy Lamarr (1914–2000), Austrian-born American film actress and inventor, born Hedwig Eva Maria Kiesler

== See also ==
- Kesler
- Keisler
- Kieler (disambiguation)
- Kieser
- Katrin Kieseler, German-born Australian sprint canoer
