= Annie Kaylor =

American restauranteur (1927–2013)

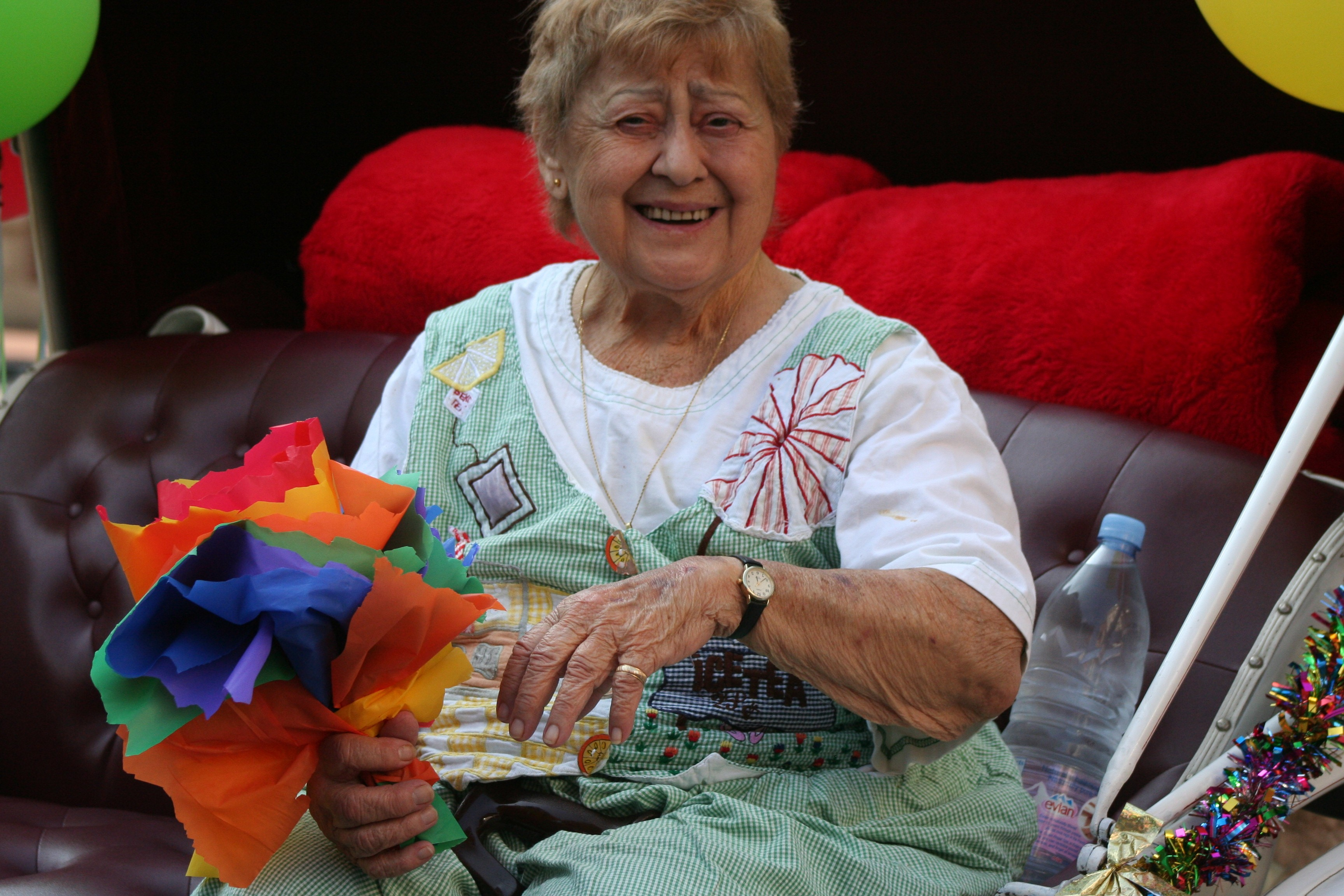
- Annie Kaylor before the Capital Pride parade, 13 June 2009
- Born: Anne John Katinas; August 20, 1927; Washington, D.C.
- Died: July 24, 2013 (aged 85); Arlington County
- Occupation: Restaurateur

Annie Kaylor (born Anne John Katinas; August 20, 1927 – July 24, 2013) was an American restaurateur known for running Annie's Paramount Steakhouse and for her support of the LGBT community in Washington, D.C.

== Early life ==
Kaylor was born Anne John Katinas on August 20, 1927, in Washington, D.C. Her parents were Greek immigrants.

== Career ==
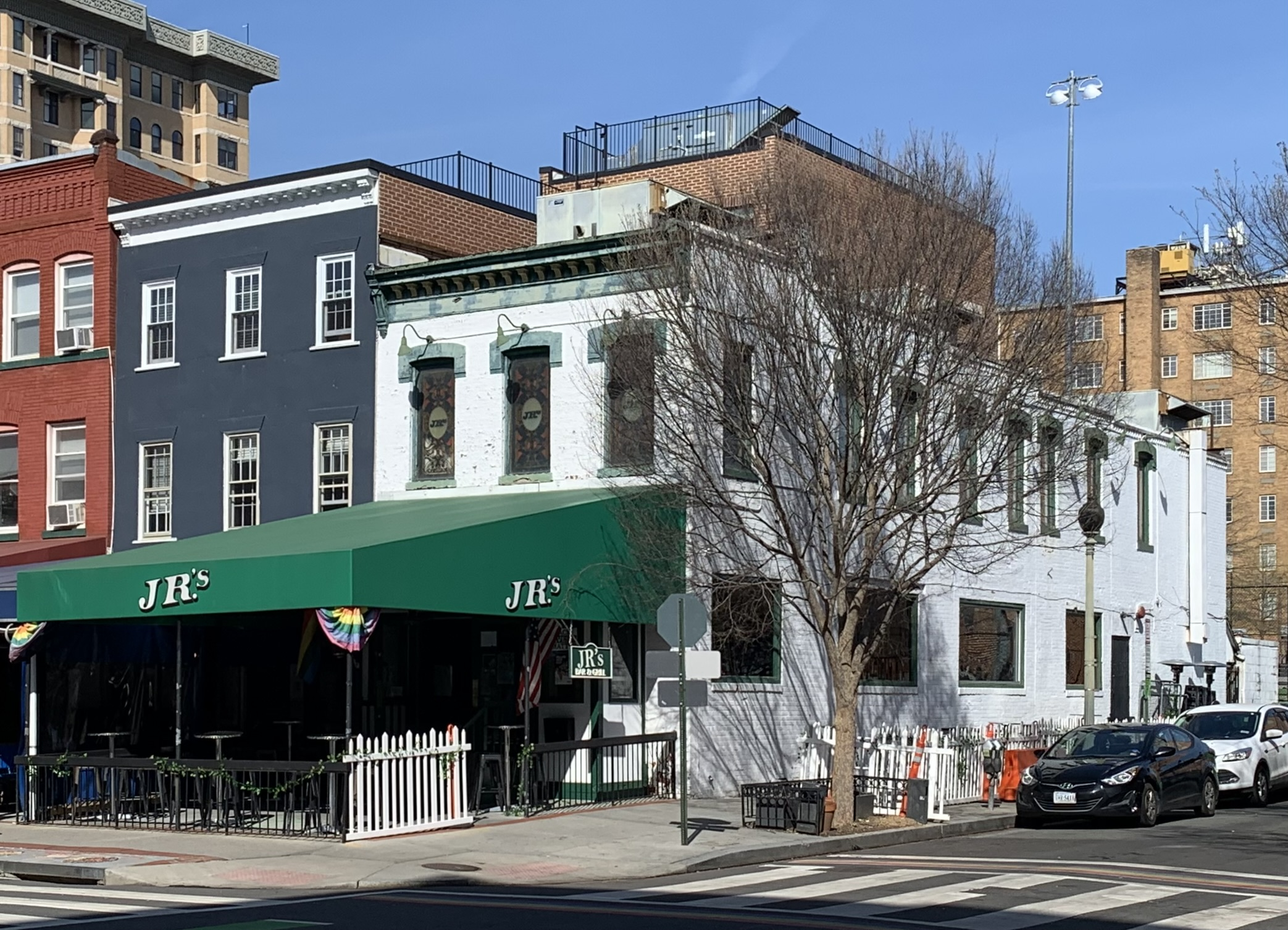
Former location of Annie's Paramount Steakhouse from 1948 to 1985, now JR's Bar & Grill

Paramount Steakhouse was founded in 1948 by Kaylor's older brother, George, in the Dupont Circle neighborhood of Washington, D.C. Kaylor began working at the restaurant in 1952, originally staffing the bar with her sister, Sue, during nights and weekends. In the 1960s, George changed the name of restaurant to "Annie's Paramount Steakhouse" to distinguish the restaurant from other Paramount Steakhouse locations he had opened and because of Kaylor's "dramatic personality" that entertained patrons.

Starting in the 1950s, the restaurant was predominantly patronized by gay men, and led Kaylor to become an ally to the LGBTQ community in Washington, D.C. In the 1960s or 1970s, customers recalled Kaylor encouraging two men holding hands under a table to stop hiding and hold their hands on top of the table.

In a 1981 Washington Post Style column, Michael Kernan described Annie's as a place where "many of the gay guys who live in the neighborhood (and elsewhere) swarm in, mixing peacefully with straight couples."

In 1985, the restaurant moved from its original location at 1519 17th Street NW one block north to its current location at 1609 17th Street NW.

With Kaylor's leadership, the restaurant embraced its reputation as a gay gathering place, and became a sponsor for the Gay Men's Chorus of Washington, D.C. and Capital Pride. Since same-sex marriage was legalized in Washington in 2010, Annie's Paramount Steakhouse has held multiple weddings.

After leading the restaurant for 50 years, Kaylor continued to make occasional appearances at the restaurant after her retirement, and appeared in the Capital Pride Parade riding in the Annie's contingency.

The Gay Men's Chorus of Washington, D.C., visited the restaurant to sing for Kaylor's 80th birthday party.

== Death and legacy ==
Kaylor died of congestive heart failure on July 24, 2013, at her home in Arlington. In 2015, D.C.'s Rainbow History Project posthumously recognized Kaylor's contributions as an ally to the LGBTQ community.
