= Samuel Betts (Connecticut politician) =

American politician

Samuel Isaac Betts

Deputy of the General Assembly of the Colony of Connecticut from Norwalk
- In office May 1693 – October 1693 Serving with Samuel Hayes
- Preceded by: John Platt, James Olmsted
- Succeeded by: Samuel Hayes, James Olmsted

Member of the Connecticut House of Representatives from Norwalk
- In office May 1710 – October 1710 Serving with Joseph Platt
- Preceded by: Samuel Keeler, Joseph Platt
- Succeeded by: John Betts

Personal details
- Born: April 4, 1660 Milford, Connecticut Colony
- Died: May 31, 1733 (aged 73)
- Spouse: Judith Reynolds (m. December 10, 1692)
- Children: Mary Betts Olmsted, Samuel Betts, Stephen Betts, Nathan Betts, Hepzibah Betts Nobles, Judith Betts

Samuel Isaac Betts (April 4, 1660 – May 31, 1733) was a deputy of the General Assembly of the Colony of Connecticut from Norwalk in the sessions of May 1693, and a member of the Connecticut House of Representatives in the session of May 1710.

He was the son of Thomas and Mary Raymond Betts, and the brother of Thomas Betts.

Preceded by John Platt; James Olmsted	Deputy of the General Assembly of the Colony of Connecticut from Norwalk; May 1693–October 1693; With: Samuel Hayes	Succeeded by Samuel Hayes; James Olmsted
Preceded by Samuel Keeler; Joseph Platt	Member of the House of Representatives of the Colony of Connecticut from Norwalk; May 1710–October 1710; With: Joseph Platt	Succeeded by John Betts
