= Keillor =

Surname

- The location of Keillor in Perth and Kinross

Origin
- Region of origin: Scotland; Angus

Other names
- Variant forms: Keiller, Caylor, and Kaylor

Keillor is a surname of Scottish origin. As of 2016, there were 204 bearers of the surname in the UK. As of 1881, there were 210 people surnamed Keillor in Great Britain, mainly in Angus and Perthshire. Variants of the surname include Keiller, Caylor, and Kaylor.

== Origin and variants ==
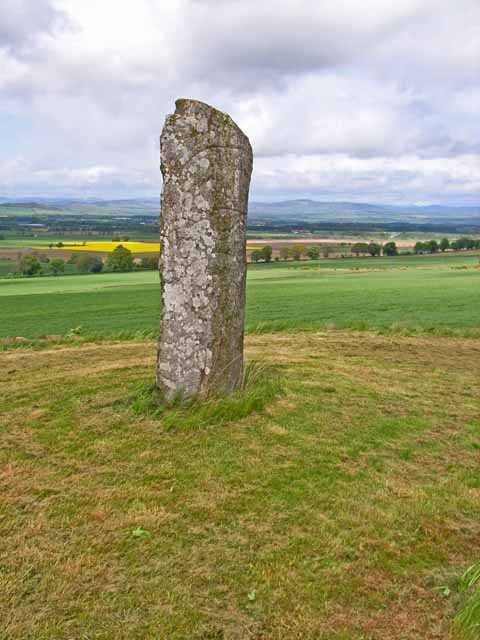
The Keillor Stone. A Bronze Age tumulus at High Keillor near Keillor in Perth and Kinross

Keillor is a habitational name derived from a small settlement called "Keillor" in the village of Kettins near the town of Coupar Angus in the council area of Perth and Kinross in northeastern Scotland.

== Notable people with the surname ==
- Alex Keillor, Scottish footballer
- Davis Keillor-Dunn, English footballer
- Elaine Keillor, Canadian musicologist, pianist and professor
- Garrison Keillor, American author, singer, humorist, voice actor, and radio personality
- Sharon Keillor, namesake of the Sharon Keillor Award for Women in Engineering Education
- Steven Keillor, American historian
- Thomas Keillor, Canadian farmer, minister and politician

== See also ==
- Keiller
- Keeler (disambiguation), place or surname
- Keeley (disambiguation)
