= Kieser =

Kieser is a surname. Notable people with the surname include:

- Dietrich Georg von Kieser (1779–1862), German physician
- Hans-Lukas Kieser (born 1957), Swiss historian of the late Ottoman Empire and Turkey

== See also ==
- Kiesler
