= One in Ten (organization) =

One In Ten (OIT) is a non-profit, all-volunteer LGBTQ arts organization in Washington, D.C. Its largest program is Reel Affirmations, the third largest LGBT film festival (in terms of attendance) in the United States and the largest all-volunteer film festival in the world.

== Governance and history ==
One In Ten is overseen by a board of three officers and nine board members. A full-time, paid executive director oversees the day-to-day operations of the organization. All One In Ten programs, including Reel Affirmations, are conceived, organized and implemented by volunteers.

One In Ten was co-founded by Barry Becker, Mark Betchkal, Matthew Cibellis and Keith Clark, gay residents of Washington, D.C. The four began meeting in 1990, and founded One In Ten as the parent organization for Reel Affirmations. The four sought the advice and input of Frameline, then the largest LGBT gay film festival in the U.S. With financial and administrative assistance from Frameline, the first Reel Affirmations film festival opened on October 11, 1991.

== Capital Pride ==
In 1995, One In Ten assumed responsibility for organizing Washington, D.C.'s Gay Pride Day events after the festival's original sponsoring organization nearly went bankrupt. One In Ten moved the street festival from Francis Junior High to Freedom Plaza near the White House on Pennsylvania Avenue N.W. The organization also changed the festival's parade route. Instead of traveling south from Meridian Hill Park and then westward on P Street N.W. to finish at Francis Junior High School, the parade now began at the school, moved east along P Street N.W. to 14th Street N.W., and then south on 14th Street to Freedom Plaza.

However, the financial and organizational strain of producing the event proved too heavy for the arts group. In 1997, Whitman-Walker Clinic joined One In Ten as a co-sponsor of the festival, and the event was renamed Capital Pride. The street festival was moved off Freedom Plaza and onto Pennsylvania Avenue N.W. between 14th and 10th Streets N.W. Corporate sponsorships also rose dramatically, reflecting the festival's growing commercial nature. Corporate sponsorships reached $247,000 in 1999, up from $80,000 in 1998.

In 2000, Whitman-Walker Clinic became the sole co-sponsor of Capital Pride, although One In Ten continued to serve on the festival's community board along with other organizations.

== See also ==
- List of LGBT-related organizations
