= Mary Keeler =

American politician (1901–1997)

Member of the Connecticut House of Representatives from Ridgefield
- In office 1959–1961 Serving with Romeo G. Petroni
- Preceded by: Romeo G. Petroni; Robert R. Keeler
- Succeeded by: Romeo G. Petroni; John C. Kelly

Personal details
- Born: Mary Bassett; April 5, 1901 North Haven, Connecticut, U.S.
- Died: February 10, 1998 (aged 96) Danbury, Connecticut, U.S.
- Party: Republican
- Spouse: Robert R. Keeler (m. 1925; died 1959)
- Children: 3

Mary J. Keeler (April 5, 1901 – February 10, 1997) was an American politician who served in the Connecticut House of Representatives from 1959 to 1961, representing the town of Ridgefield as a Republican. Her husband, Robert R. Keeler, represented Ridgefield from 1951 to his death in May 1959, and she was elected to serve the remainder of his unexpired term. She did not run for reelection in 1960.
