= Raymond Keiller Butchart =

Scottish mathematician

Raymond Keiller Butchart FRSE (1888–1930) was a short-lived Scottish mathematician. He served for two years as Professor of Mathematics at Raffles College in Singapore. He lost a leg in the First World War.

== Life ==
He was born in Dundee in Scotland on 4 May 1888, the only son of Margaret and Robert K Butchart. His father was a manager in a local jute spinning mill.

He attended Morgan Academy and the High School of Dundee before receiving a place at the University of St Andrews where he received a bachelor's degree in mathematics in 1913. During this time he studied at University College, Dundee, now the University of Dundee, which was then a college of the university in St Andrews. After graduating he worked as a student assistant in the Mathematics department of University College, Dundee until December 1914. He then gave up a position in Wilson College in Bombay to instead serve his country. He received a commission as a lieutenant in the 14th battalion Royal Scots on 24 December 1915.

After training at Stobs in the Scottish Borders he got a position as brigade signals officer. He left for France and Flanders in the summer of 1915. He rose to the rank of captain. He was seriously wounded and lost a leg. He was not discharged from the army until 1920. He was elected a fellow of the Royal Society of Edinburgh in February 1915 (shortly before being sent to France). His proposers included D'Arcy Wentworth Thompson.

In July 1921 the University of St Andrews awarded him a PhD and gave him the new title of lecturer in mathematics.

From 1928 to 1930 he was professor of mathematics at Raffles College in Singapore and apparently very much enjoyed the climate there. He left Singapore with his wife on 24 March 1930, for their first return trip to Scotland.

He died of malaria, which materialised soon after boarding ship. He died in the Indian Ocean. He was buried at sea, 65 miles south-east of Colombo on the same day, 30 March 1930.

== Family ==
He married Jean Ainslie Broome in 1921.

== Publications ==
- The Dissipation of Energy in Simple and Multiple Wires (1921)
