= Samuel Smith (Connecticut politician) =

Settler of Norwalk, Connecticut

Deputy of the General Assembly of the Colony of Connecticut from Norwalk
- In office May 1691 – October 1691 Serving with Andrew Messenger
- Preceded by: Christopher Comstock, Thomas Seamer
- Succeeded by: John Belding, James Olmsted

Personal details
- Born: c. 1646
- Died: c. 1735 New Canaan, Connecticut Colony
- Resting place: East Norwalk Historical Cemetery, Norwalk, Connecticut
- Spouse(s): Rachael Marvin, daughter of Matthew Marvin Sr. (m. 1670)
- Children: Rachel Smith Benedict, Sarah Smith, Lydia Smith Lockwood (m. James Lockwood), Hannah Smith, Nehemiah Smith, Ruth Smith, Samuel Smith, Jr.

Samuel Smith (c. 1646—c. 1735) was an early settler of Norwalk, Connecticut. He was a deputy of the General Assembly of the Colony of Connecticut from Norwalk in the May 1691 session.

Due to the commonality of the name, and conflicting records, it is difficult to determine the exact origins of Samuel Smith. He might have been the son of Captain William Smith, a magistrate in Weymouth, Massachusetts Bay Colony. He moved to Norwalk as a young man, and he listed among its earliest settlers. His father-in-law, Matthew Marvin Sr. gave Smith half of his home lot and orchard.

In 1672, he owned "a parcel of land in Indian Field," not far from the Norwalk-Westport boundary.

He was named a freeman in 1674. In 1679, he served as town treasurer. He was on a committee, along with Matthew Marvin Sr., and John Bowton to obtain a minister for the settlement, which appointed Reverend Thomas Hanford. He served as a deputy of the Connecticut General Court in 1691. He was a townsman in 1698, 1702, 1706, and 1712. In 1702, he was selectman.

In 1680 or 1681 he owned a home-lot of four acres adjacent to Strawberry Hill.

Preceded by Christopher Comstock; Thomas Seamer	Deputy of the General Assembly of the Colony of Connecticut from Norwalk; May 1691; With: Andrew Messenger	Succeeded by John Belding; James Olmsted
