= Lambda Rising =

Defunct LGBT bookstore in Washington, D.C., United States

Coordinates: 38.912°N 77.0444°W

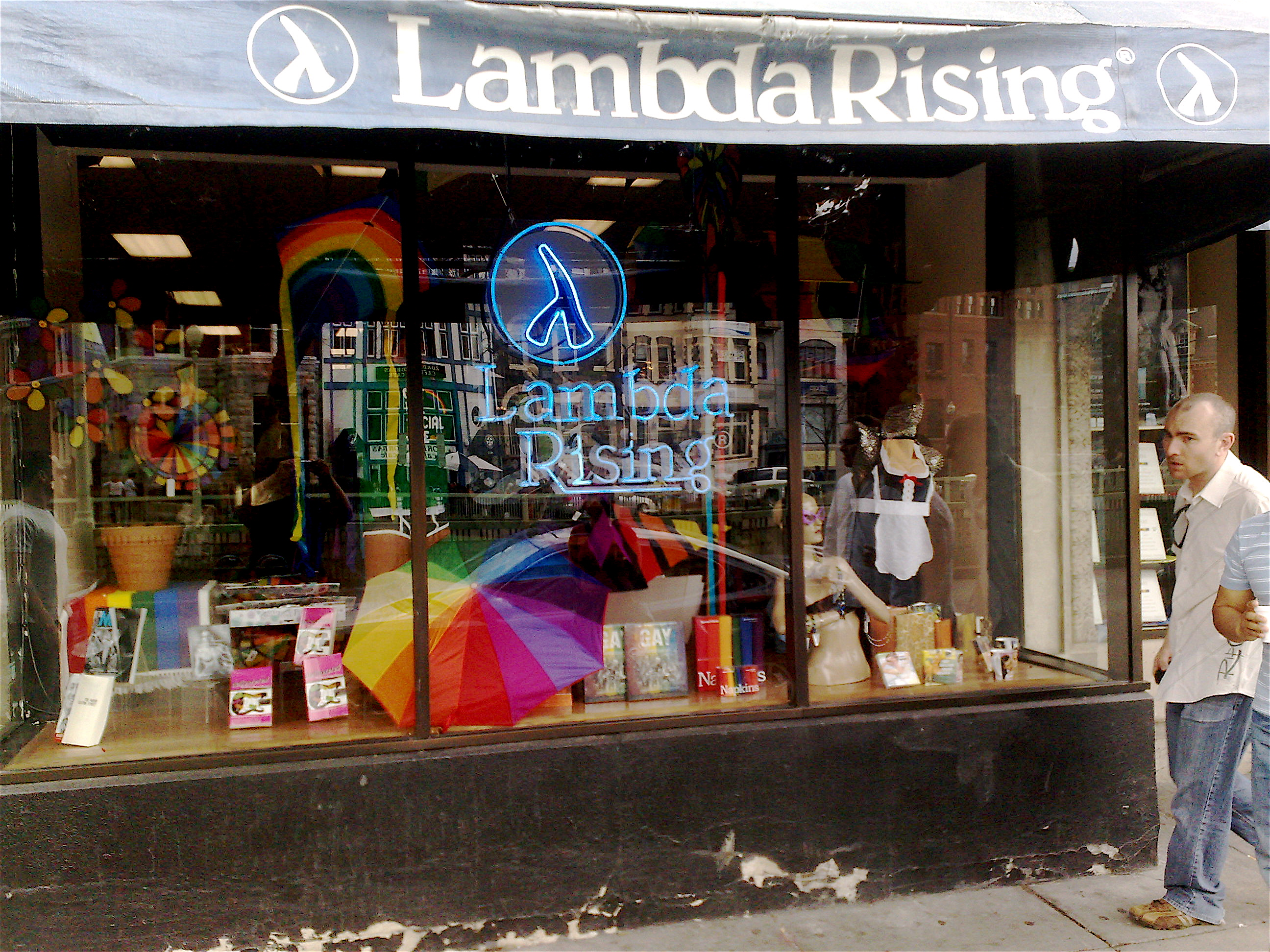
Lambda Rising in March 2009, shortly before it closed

Lambda Rising was an LGBT bookstore that operated from 1974 to 2010 in Washington, D.C.

Founded by Deacon Maccubbin in 1974 with 250 titles, it was known for its wide selection of books, ranging from queer theory and religion to erotica, as well as DVDs, music CDs and gifts.

== History ==
The bookstore originally was located in 300 square feet (28 m^{2}) at 1724 20th Street NW. It moved to a 900-square-foot (84 m^{2}) retail space at 2001 S Street NW in 1979 and, in 1984, moved to a 4,800-square-foot (450 m^{2}) space at 1625 Connecticut Ave NW Connecticut Avenue in Dupont Circle, one of Washington's neighborhoods popular among the gay and lesbian community.

A second store in Baltimore, Maryland, believed by the Baltimore Sun to be the only gay bookstore in Maryland, opened in 1984 and closed in the spring of 2008. Film director John Waters declared that store's closing "very, very sad". Waters, a long-time customer, said the Baltimore shop was "a seriously good bookshop, with the added touch of porno...I always went in there to find books that I didn't know about and couldn't find anywhere else." A third store in Rehoboth Beach, Delaware opened in 1991 and closed in December 2009.

A fourth store in Norfolk, Virginia opened in 1996 and closed in June 2007.

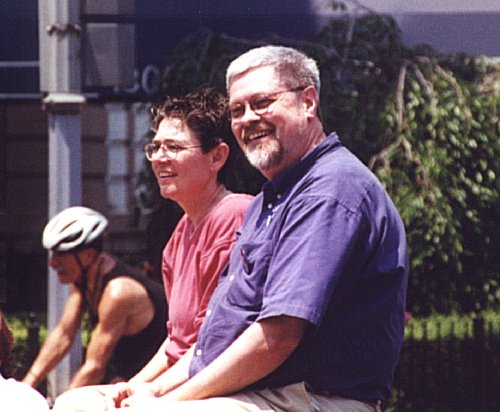
Deacon Maccubbin (right), founder and co-owner of Lambda Rising, at the Capital Pride gay parade in 2003, with Mary Farmer, former owner of the lesbian feminist bookstore Lammas in Washington, D.C.

In February 1975, Lambda Rising ran the world's first gay-oriented television commercial; it aired on WRC (owned by NBC) and WTOP (the local CBS affiliate, now WUSA). Also in 1975, Lambda Rising organized Gay Pride Day, the forerunner to Capital Pride, Washington's first annual gay pride celebration, and continued to host the event for the next four years and then turned it over to a non-profit organization.

To support LGBT literature, Lambda Rising created the Lambda Book Report in 1987 and the annual Lambda Literary Award, also known as "the Lammys", in 1989. In 1996, Lambda Rising turned those projects over to the new non-profit Lambda Literary Foundation.

In February 2003, Lambda Rising bought the Oscar Wilde Bookshop, the country's first gay and lesbian bookstore, to prevent it from closing. The store was founded by Craig Rodwell in 1967 at 291 Mercer Street in Greenwich Village, later moving to 15 Christopher Street, opposite Gay Street in Manhattan. After working with the New York City staff for three years and getting the store on solid financial footing, Lambda Rising sold the store to the long-time manager in order to return the store to local control.

In December 2009, Maccubbin announced that Lambda Rising's two stores would close by January 2010. In his statement, Maccubbin said

The phrase 'mission accomplished' has gotten a bad rap in recent years, but in this case, it certainly applies.

When we set out to establish Lambda Rising in 1974, it was intended as a demonstration of the demand for gay and lesbian literature. We thought...we could encourage the writing and publishing of LGBT books, and sooner or later other bookstores would put those books on their own shelves and there would be less need for a specifically gay and lesbian bookstore. Today, 35 years later, nearly every general bookstore carries LGBT books.

We said when we opened it: Our goal is to show there's a market for LGBT literature, to show authors they should be writing this literature, to show publishers they should be publishing it, and bookstores they should be carrying it. And if we're successful, there will no longer be a need for a specialty gay and lesbian book store because every bookstore will be carrying them. And 35 years later, that's what happened. We call that mission accomplished.

Facing competition with online book stores, the store closed its doors on December 31, 2010. It was part of a spate of LGBT brick and mortar bookstores closures in the early 21st century, including the Oscar Wilde Bookshop in New York and A Different Light in Los Angeles and San Francisco.
