= John Keeler =

Deputy of the General Assembly of the Colony of Connecticut from Norwalk
- In office October 1698 – May 1699 Serving with Samuel Hayes
- Preceded by: Samuel Hayes
- Succeeded by: James Olmsted

Personal details
- Born: February 9, 1654 Norwalk, Connecticut Colony
- Died: May 19, 1717 (aged 63) Norwalk, Connecticut Colony
- Spouse(s): Sarah Beckwith, Mehitable Rockwell (m. June 18, 1679)
- Children: Elizabeth Keeler Hoyt (m. Daniel Hoyt), John Keeler, Jr., Mehittabel Keeler Blatchly Hoyt, Hannah Keeler Bolt Gregory, Sarah Keeler Hoyt, David Keeler, Daniel Keeler, Jemima Keeler Canfield Benedict, Ruth Keeler Benedict

John Keeler (February 9, 1654 – May 19, 1717) was a member of the General Assembly of the Colony of Connecticut from Norwalk in the October 1698 session.

He was the son of Ralph Keeler and Sarah Howes and the brother of Samuel Keeler.

The Norwalk town meeting of February 20, 1679 named him among four "masters or overseers of those pounds lieing by five mile river side." His name appears in a 1694 list of "persons who are members of town meetings, who have a vote and suffrage in town affairs." The question of whether to repair and enlarge the meeting house or to build a new one "on the place where John Keeler's barn stands" was considered at a town meeting January 9, 1719.

Preceded by Samuel Hayes	Deputy of the General Assembly of the Colony of Connecticut from Norwalk; October 1698–May 1699; With: Samuel Hayes	Succeeded by James Olmsted
