= Thomas Betts =

American politician

Deputy of the General Assembly of the Colony of Connecticut from Norwalk
- In office May 1692 – October 1692 Serving with Samuel Hayes
- Preceded by: John Belding, James Olmsted
- Succeeded by: John Platt, James Olmsted
- In office October 1694 – May 1695 Serving with John Platt
- Preceded by: Matthew Marvin, Jr., Samuel Hayes
- Succeeded by: Samuel Hayes, Jakin Gregory

Member of the Connecticut House of Representatives from Norwalk
- In office May 1704 – May 1705 Serving with Samuel Keeler
- Preceded by: Samuel Hayes, Samuel Keeler
- Succeeded by: John Belding, Joseph Platt
- In office October 1705 – May 1706 Serving with Samuel Hanford
- Preceded by: Joseph Platt, John Belding
- Succeeded by: Samuel Keeler, John Copp
- In office May 1707 – October 1707 Serving with Samuel Hanford
- Preceded by: Joseph Platt
- Succeeded by: Joseph Platt

Personal details
- Born: June 3, 1650 Guilford, Connecticut Colony
- Died: between September 5 and December 24, 1717
- Spouse(s): Sarah Marvin, daughter of Matthew Marvin, Jr. (m. January 13, 1680, Norwalk)
- Children: John Betts, Thomas Betts, Sarah Betts (m. Joseph St. John, 1695; Samuel Keeler, 1712), Matthew Betts, Mary Betts Bartlett (m. John Bartlett), Elizabeth Betts (m. Captain Thomas Seymour)
- Occupation: miller

Coat of Arms of Thomas Betts

Thomas Betts (June 3, 1650 – between September 5 and December 24, 1717) was a deputy of the General Assembly of the Colony of Connecticut from Norwalk in the sessions of May 1692, and October 1694, and a member of the Connecticut House of Representatives in the sessions of May and October 1704, October 1705, and May 1707.

== Biography ==
He was born June 3, 1650, in Guilford, Connecticut Colony, the son of Thomas Betts (1615–1688) and Mary Raymond. He was the brother of Samuel Betts. He moved to Norwalk with his parents in 1664.

On December 15, 1709, the town granted, by majority vote, to Joseph Birchard, Thomas Betts, John Betts, and John Gregory, Jr., permission to build a dam for the purpose of a powering a grist mill.

Preceded by John Belding; James Olmsted	Deputy of the General Assembly of the Colony of Connecticut from Norwalk; May 1692–October 1692; With: Samuel Hayes	Succeeded by John Platt; James Olmsted
Preceded by Matthew Marvin, Jr. Samuel Hayes	Deputy of the General Assembly of the Colony of Connecticut from Norwalk; October 1694–May 1695; With: John Platt	Succeeded by Samuel Hayes; Jakin Gregory
Preceded by Samuel Hayes; Samuel Keeler	Member of the House of Representatives of the Colony of Connecticut from Norwalk; May 1704–May 1705; With: Samuel Keeler	Succeeded by John Belding; Joseph Platt
Preceded by Joseph Platt; John Belding	Member of the House of Representatives of the Colony of Connecticut from Norwalk; October 1705–May 1706; With: Samuel Hanford	Succeeded by Samuel Keeler; John Copp
Preceded by Joseph Platt	Member of the House of Representatives of the Colony of Connecticut from Norwalk; May 1707–October 1707; With: Samuel Hanford	Succeeded by Joseph Platt
