= Deacon Maccubbin =

American LGBTQ rights activist

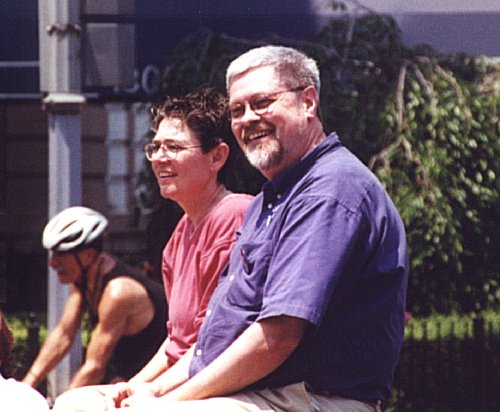
- Deacon Maccubbin in 2003, at the Capital Pride gay pride parade
- Born: Larry Page Maccubbin; 1943 (age 82–83)
- Citizenship: United States
- Occupations: LGBTQ rights activist, bookstore owner

Larry Page "Deacon" Maccubbin (born 1943) is an American LGBTQ rights activist who is the founder of Washington D.C.'s first Pride parade and is "father" of the Lambda Literary Awards. He is also a founder and chair of the Washington Area Gay Community Council (WAGCC).

== Life and activism ==
In his early life, Maccubin served in the United States Army. While in the service, he briefly joined the Gay Liberation Front D.C. He became a gay rights activist in 1969, when he was 26 years old, the year he came out as gay.

Maccubbin opened the gay bookstore Lambda Rising in 1974 in Washington, D.C. As he was planning to attend New York Pride, Maccubbin's friends suggested that he start a Pride celebration locally. Thus, Maccubbin organized a Gay Pride block party in front of his store at 1724 20th Street NW. With the help of his friend Bob Carpenter, Maccubbin further organized and wrangled 2,000 attendees. In addition to the block party-turned-parade, Maccubbin also created the first gay youth support group in D.C. and the gay switchboard.

In 1989, Maccubbin and partners founded the Lambda Literary Awards.

In 2015, Maccubbin served as grand marshal of the Capitol Pride Parade, which he founded.

== Awards ==
- Distinguished Service Award, Gay and Lesbian Activists Alliance (GLAA)
- Pioneer Award, 8th Lambda Literary Awards
- Community Pioneer Award, Rainbow History Project

== Personal life ==
Maccubbin has been married to Jim Bennett since February 26, 1982.

Maccubbin collects antiques, including copperplate engravings from the 17th and 18th centuries, and possesses many rare LGBTQ books.
