= Kesler =

Kesler is a surname. Notable people with the name include:

- Charles R. Kesler, American academic
- Gordon Kesler, Canadian politician
- Hindrek Kesler (born 1958), Estonian architect
- Jay Kesler, American academic
- Reg Kesler (1919–2001), Canadian rodeo stock contractor
- Ryan Kesler (born 1984), American professional ice hockey player
- Stan Kesler (1928–2020), American musician, songwriter, and record producer
- Tan Kesler (born 1979), Turkish sports executive

== See also ==
- Lee–Kesler method
- Kessler (name)
- Kiesler
