= Samuel Keeler =

American politician

Member of the House of Representatives of the Colony of Connecticut from Norwalk
- In office October 1701 – May 1702 Serving with Andrew Messenger
- Preceded by: Samuel Hayes
- Succeeded by: Andrew Messenger
- In office October 1703 – October 1704 Serving with Samuel Hayes
- Succeeded by: Thomas Betts
- In office May 1706 – October 1706 Serving with John Copp
- Preceded by: Thomas Betts, Samuel Hanford
- Succeeded by: Joseph Platt
- In office May 1709 – May 1710 Serving with John Betts, Joseph Platt
- Preceded by: Joseph Platt, John Betts
- Succeeded by: Samuel Betts, Joseph Platt

Personal details
- Born: 1656 Norwalk, Connecticut Colony
- Died: May 19, 1713 (aged 56–57) Ridgefield, Connecticut Colony
- Resting place: Ye Burying Yard, Ridgefield, Connecticut
- Spouse: Sarah St. John Keeler (m. March 10, 1682)
- Children: Timothy Keeler, Samuel Keeler, Joseph Keeler, Jonah Keeler

Military service
- Battles/wars: King Philip's War, Narragansett Swamp Fight

Samuel Keeler (1656 – May 19, 1713) was a member of the House of Representatives of the Colony of Connecticut from Norwalk in the sessions of October 1701, October 1703, May 1704, May 1706, May 1709 and October 1709. He is listed as a founding settler of Ridgefield, Connecticut on the founder's monument in Ye Burying Ground cemetery in Ridgefield.

He was the son of Ralph Keeler and the brother of John Keeler.

On December 19, 1675, Samuel participated in the Narragansett Swamp Fight in Rhode Island during King Philip's War. On account of his service, at a Norwalk town meeting on January 12, 1676, he was granted a parcel of land on Clapboard Hill.

In 1708, Samuel Keeler, father-in-law Matthias Sention, Sr., and Matthew St. John took part in the purchase of Ridgefield from the Indians for 100 pounds.

== Notable descendants ==
- Samuel is the third-great-grandfather of Edwin O. Keeler (1846–1923), Lieutenant Governor of Connecticut, and first mayor of Norwalk after its incorporation as a city.

Preceded by Samuel Hayes	Member of the House of Representatives of the Colony of Connecticut from Norwalk; October 1701 – May 1702; With: Andrew Messenger	Succeeded by Andrew Messenger
Preceded by	Member of the House of Representatives of the Colony of Connecticut from Norwalk; October 1703 – October 1704; With: Samuel Hayes	Succeeded by Thomas Betts
Preceded by Thomas Betts; Samuel Hanford	Member of the House of Representatives of the Colony of Connecticut from Norwalk; May 1706 – October 1706; With: John Copp	Succeeded by Joseph Platt
Preceded by Joseph Platt; John Betts	Member of the House of Representatives of the Colony of Connecticut from Norwalk; May 1709 – May 1710; With: John Betts; Joseph Platt	Succeeded by Samuel Betts; Joseph Platt
