= Capital Pride (Washington, D.C.) =

Annual LGBT event in Washington, D.C.

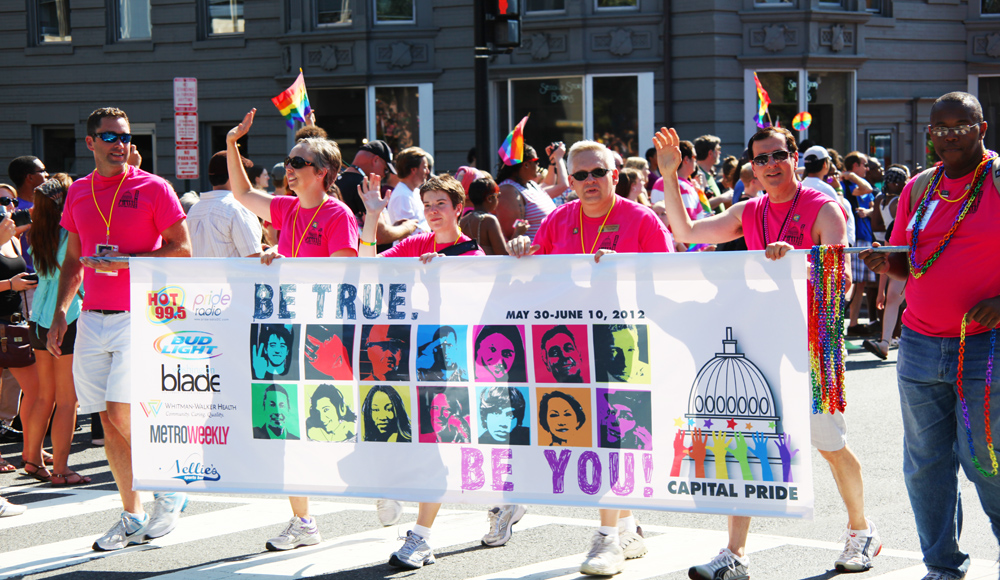
- Marchers hold the Capital Pride banner during the Capital Pride parade on June 9, 2012
- Status: Active
- Genre: Pride festival
- Location: Washington, D.C.
- Country: United States
- Years active: 51
- Inaugurated: 1975
- Website: www.capitalpride.org

Capital Pride is an annual LGBT pride festival held in early June each year in Washington, D.C. It was founded as Gay Pride Day, a one-day block party and street festival, in 1975. In 1980 the P Street Festival Committee formed to take over planning. It changed its name to Gay and Lesbian Pride Day in 1981. In 1991, the event moved to the week prior to Father's Day. Financial difficulties led a new organization, One In Ten, to take over planning of the festival. Whitman-Walker Clinic (WWC) joined One In Ten as co-sponsor of the event in 1997, at which time the event's name was changed to Capital Pride. Whitman-Walker became the sole sponsor in 2000. But the healthcare organization came under significant financial pressures, and in 2008 turned over producing duties to a new organization, Capital Pride Alliance.

The event drew 2,000 people its first year and grew to 10,000 people covering 3 blocks in 1979. By 1984, it had expanded to a week-long event and by 1987 an estimated 28,000 attendees came to the street festival and parade. Attendance began fluctuating in the late 1980s, but stabilized in the 1990s. The festival was the fourth-largest gay pride event in the United States in 2007. Capital Pride saw record attendance for its 35th anniversary celebration in 2010. An estimated 100,000 people turned out for the parade and another 250,000 for the street festival in 2012.

== History ==
=== 1970s ===
The festival was first held on Father's Day in 1975. Deacon Maccubbin, owner of the LGBT bookstore Lambda Rising, organized the city's first annual gay pride event. It was a one-day community block party held on 20th Street NW between R and S Streets NW in Washington, D.C. (the same block where Lambda Rising was then located). Two vending trucks, one loaded with beer and another with soft drinks, served the crowd. About 2,000 people attended and visited about a dozen organizational booths and vendors. In a surprising political move indicative of the growing political power of gays and lesbians in the city, several candidates for the D.C. City Council also attended and shook hands for several hours.

In 1981, Gay Pride Day first hosted a parade in addition to the street festival. The growing festival drew more than 10,000 attendees that year. Washington Mayor Marion Barry, elected the previous November, attended his first Gay Pride Day in 1979—and would for the rest of his time in office as mayor.

=== 1980s ===
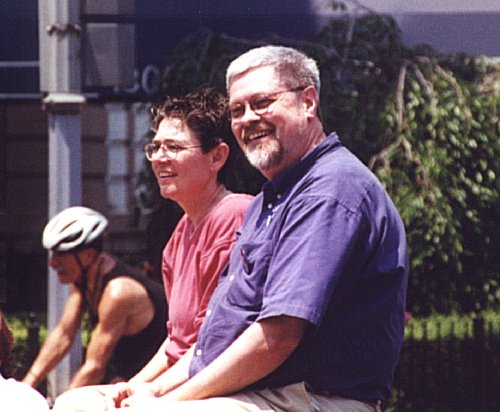
Deacon Maccubbin (in purple shirt), founder of Capital Pride, riding the Lambda Rising float in the gay pride parade in 2003.

Following the 1979 event, with crowds growing larger than could be accommodated at the original location, Maccubbin turned the planning of the event over to a new non-profit group, The P Street Festival Committee, formed in 1980 to take over the growing event. The committee established a board of directors to oversee planning and administer the festival's finances, and widened planning and participation to include a number of prominent LGBT organizations in the D.C. metro area. Gay Pride Day (as the festival was then known) moved that year to Francis Junior High School at 24th and N Streets NW, next to Rock Creek Park. In 1981, a parade route had also been established. The parade began at 16th Street NW and Meridian Hill Park, traveled along Columbia Road NW and then Connecticut Avenue NW, and ended at Dupont Circle.

1983 was the year the first woman and person of color was named grand marshal of the Gay Pride Day parade. In 1984, festival organizers began bestowing the "Heroes of Pride" award to members of racial and ethnic minorities who made a difference in their communities.

Attendance at Gay Pride Day events reached 11,000 people in 1981, 15,000 in 1982, and 20,000 in 1983. By 1984, the one-day festival had become a week-long series of meetings, speeches, dances, art exhibits, and parties. At its 10th anniversary in 1985, D.C. Gay Pride Day drew an estimated 28,000 attendees to the street festival and parade. But attendance began varying dramatically from year to year in the late 1980s. In 1986, only about 7,000 people watched the parade, and another 1,000 stayed for events at Francis Junior High. A year later, attendance was estimated variously between 7,000 and 10,000 people.

=== 1990s ===
Financial problems and growing concerns about the organization's lack of inclusiveness led the P Street Festival Committee to disband in 1990 in favor of a successor organization, Pride of Washington.

Several changes to the event occurred in 1991. The District of Columbia's African American gay community sponsored the first "Black Lesbian and Gay Pride Day" on May 25, 1991. The event was created not as a competitor to the June gay pride event but rather as a way of enhancing the visibility of the African American gay and lesbian community. 1991 also saw the Gay Pride Day parade and festival move away from its traditional date for the first time. Organizers shifted the event to the week prior to Father's Day to give people a chance to spend the holiday with their families. 1991 was also the year that the street festival expanded to more than 200 booths, and the first year that active-duty and retired American military personnel marched in the parade. The parade made national headlines when U.S. Air Force Captain Greg Greeley, who led the active-duty group, was later questioned by military security officers and told his pending discharge was on hold because of his participation in Gay Pride day. No further action against Greeley was taken, and he eventually received an honorable discharge.

The festival suffered from financial difficulties in the early 1990s. Rain during the parade and street festival significantly reduced attendance several years in a row. Unfortunately, festival organizers had decided, as a cost-saving move, to not take out weather cancellation insurance. The festival lost significant amounts of money, and came close to bankruptcy.

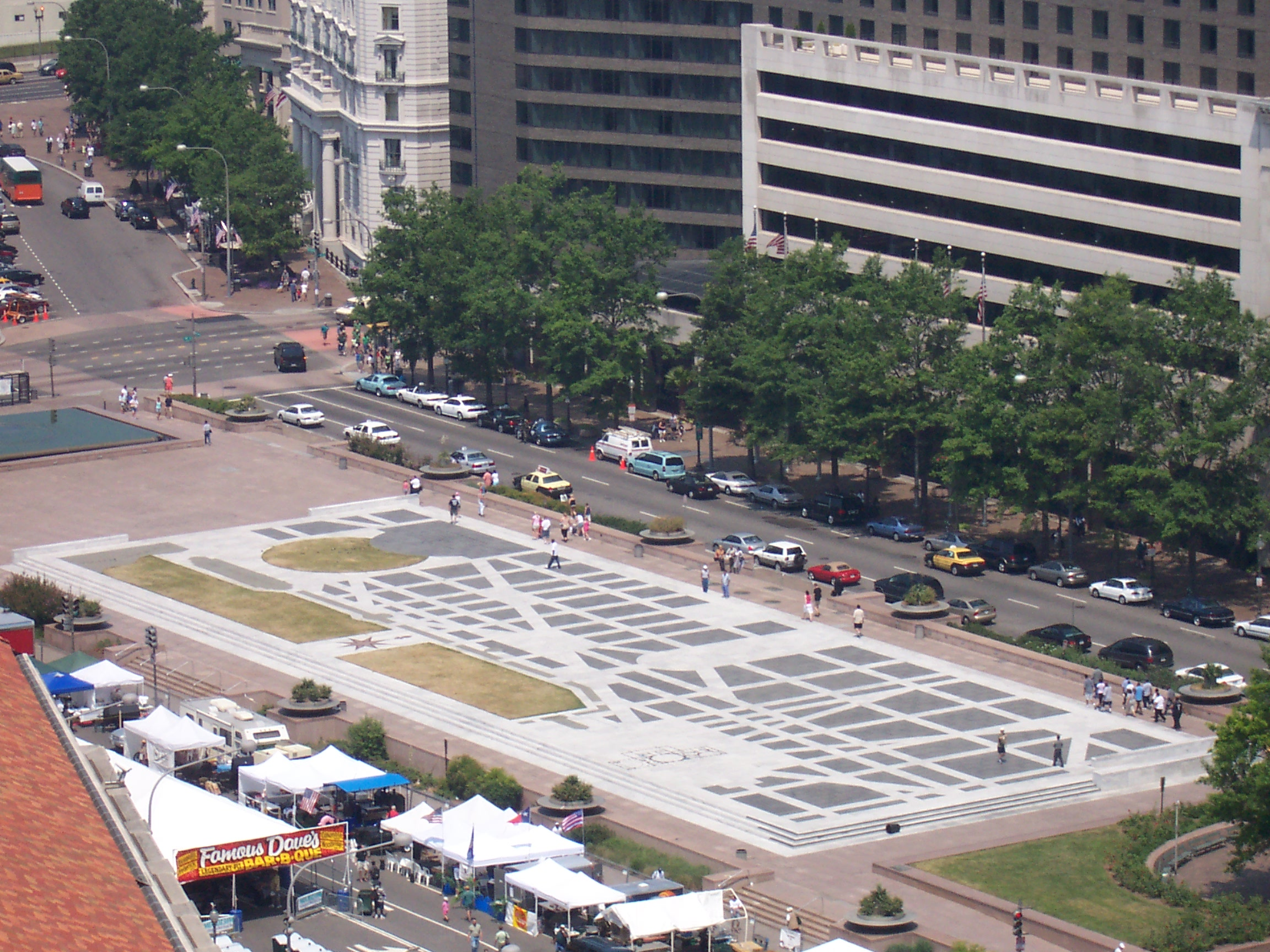
Looking southeast at Freedom Plaza, the site of the Capital Pride street festival from 1995 to 1997.

In 1995, One In Ten, a D.C.-based arts organization which hosted the Reel Affirmations film festival, assumed responsibility for organizing Gay Pride Day events. One In Ten moved the street festival from Francis Junior High to Freedom Plaza near the White House on Pennsylvania Avenue NW. The parade route also changed. Instead of traveling westward from Dupont Circle on P Street NW to finish at Francis Junior High School, the parade now began at the school, moved east along P Street to 14th Street NW, and then traveled south on 14th Street NW to Freedom Plaza.

The change in sponsorship and significant organizational and promotional changes led to sharply higher attendance. The parade and festival drew only about 25,000 attendees in 1994, but this soared to more than 100,000 by 1996.

However, the financial and organizational strain of producing the event proved too heavy for the small arts group. In 1997, Whitman-Walker Clinic joined One In Ten as a co-sponsor of the festival, and the event was renamed Capital Pride. The street festival was moved off Freedom Plaza and onto Pennsylvania Avenue NW between 14th and 10th Streets NW. Corporate sponsorships also rose dramatically, reflecting the festival's growing commercial nature. Corporate sponsorships reached $247,000 in 1999, up from $80,000 in 1998. 1997 also saw the city's first Youth Pride Day event. Sponsored by the Youth Pride Alliance, an umbrella group of LGBT organizations supporting the sexual orientation and gender expression needs of young people, the event was held first held in late April (although after 2010 it moved to a date closer to Capital Pride).

=== 2000s ===
Whitman-Walker Clinic became the sole sponsor of Capital Pride in 2000. The festival was moved to Pennsylvania Avenue NW between 4th and 7th Streets NW, and the festival's main stage repositioned so that the United States Capitol building was in the background. As a cost-saving move, in 2002 the parade was moved to early evening on Saturday while the festival continued to occur on Sunday afternoon. The same year, the number of parade contingents reached 200 for the first time. In 2004, 100,000 people attended Capital Pride events.

But financial problems once more plagued Capital Pride. The event had come to be billed as a fund-raiser for the clinic, although net revenues were also shared with other organizations. In July 2005 (after Capital Pride was over), Whitman-Walker Clinic revealed that it had asked the Human Rights Campaign, a national gay rights advocacy group, for an emergency donation of $30,000. The clinic had also asked D.C. Mayor Anthony A. Williams to waive more than $40,000 in street closing and police overtime fees. Both requests were granted. Unnamed sources quoted by the Washington Blade, a local LGBT newspaper, said Whitman-Walker's financial problems had spilled over into Capital Pride planning. Had the financial help not been forthcoming, the 2005 festival would have been significantly curtailed. Whitman-Walker officials strongly disputed the claims about the organization's finances, but did not deny that the financial requests had been made. WWC estimated the day after the festival ended that net proceeds from Capital Pride were $30,000 in 2005.

A week after the financial problems were revealed, Robert York, the Whitman-Walker staffer who had served as executive director of Capital Pride since 1999, unexpectedly resigned from the Clinic and as Capital Pride organizer. York's departure followed a series of resignations by the clinic's upper- and middle-level managers. York was replaced by clinic staff member David Mallory.

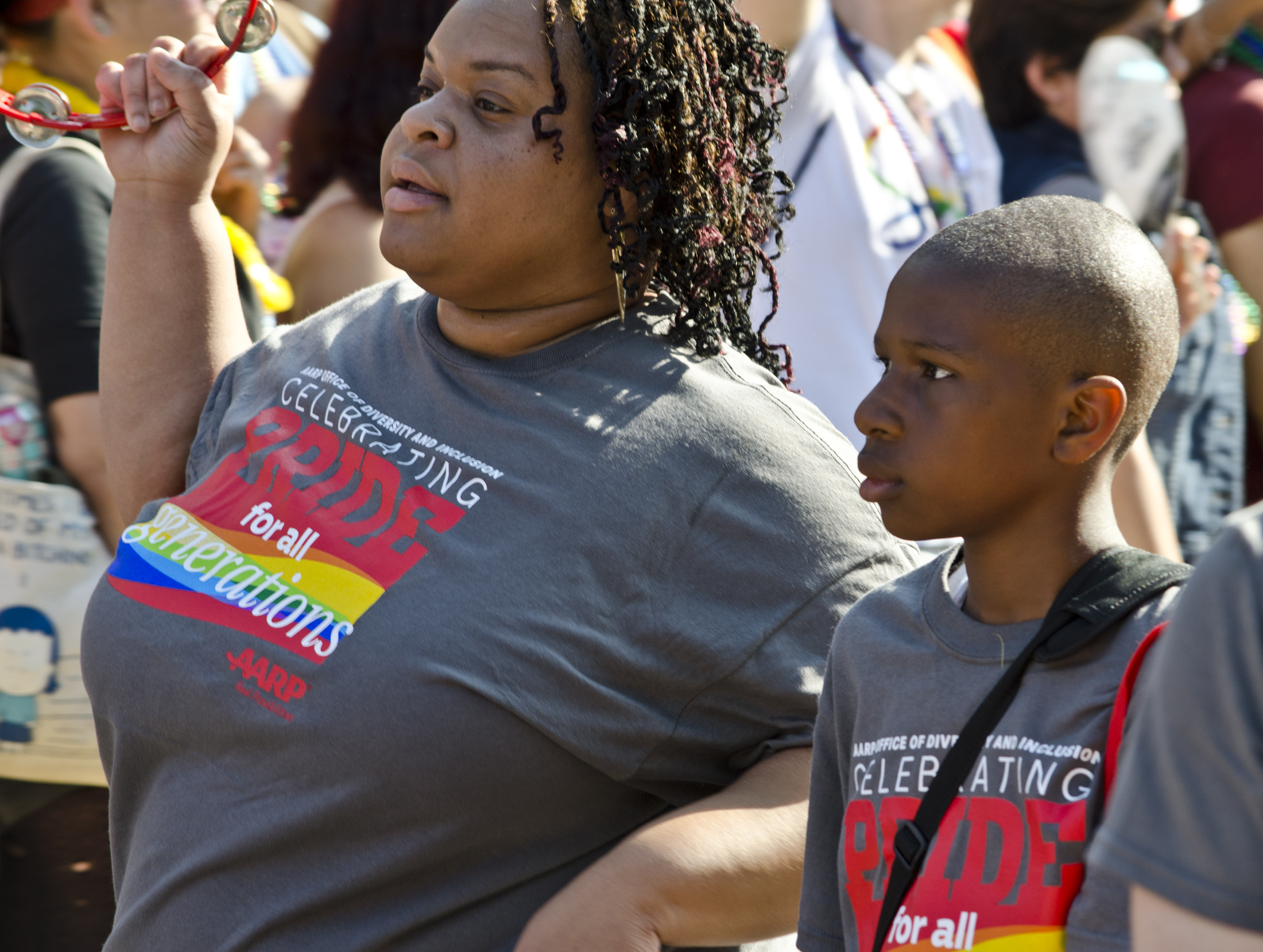
A mother and her son march in the 2013 Capital Pride parade.

Financial difficulties at Whitman-Walker Clinic led to speculation that the healthcare organization would spin off Capital Pride as an independent body or permit another group to take it over. The Washington Blade quoted unnamed Whitman-Walker staffers as saying that Capital Pride consumed a significant amount of the clinic's time, resources, and staff but did not generate large revenues in return. In April 2005, The Center, an LGBT organization attempting to build a gay and lesbian community center in the District of Columbia, approached Whitman-Walker officials and asked if they would turn Capital Pride over to them. Whitman-Walker refused the offer, citing The Center's own financial difficulties and small staff.

The financial distress and staff changes did not appear to change the event's appeal, however. Capital Pride attracted more than 200,000 people in 2006, making it the fourth-largest gay pride event in the United States. The festival included four major dance parties, a youth prom, and a transgender dinner. D.C. Leather Pride held its first events in 2006 as well, which included a Mr. and Ms. Capital Pride Leather competition.

Whitman-Walker expanded organizational oversight of Capital Pride in 2007. Although the healthcare organization remained the sole sponsor of the festival, 11 other local non-profit organizations joined with WWC to form the Capital Pride Planning Committee. This committee contributed staff and organizational resources to help produce the event. 2007 also saw the city's first Trans Pride. Organized by the D.C. Trans Coalition, an umbrella group of organizations and activists supporting the needs of transgender people, the addition of Trans Pride to Capital Pride was a direct outcome of the expanded organizational planning group. D.C. Latino Pride also held its first events in 2007 as well. Hosted by the Latino LGBT History Project, it featured an exhibit and panel discussion (which has led some to date the founding of D.C. Latino Pride to 2007's expanded events rather than 2006).

But the financial pressures on Whitman-Walker did not abate. With the clinic itself under significant financial pressure, WWC issued a Request for Proposal in the second week of January 2008 asking for one or more groups to replace WWC as the organizer and sponsor of Capital Pride. On January 11, 2008, Whitman-Walker Clinic disclosed, for the first time in years, the financial status of Capital Pride. WWC revealed that the 2007 Capital Pride festival ran a deficit of $32,795 on $167,103 in revenue. The clinic also reported that this included reimbursing itself for $100,000 in "up-front money" to pay for festival-related expenses occurred far in advance of the festival. Twelve other local organizations were also reimbursed $28,000 in up-front money as well.

In March 2008, Whitman-Walker Clinic awarded the production rights to Capital Pride to the Capital Pride Alliance—a group of volunteers and organizations formed by members of the Capital Pride Planning Committee. Capital Pride Alliance won the bid over The Center, Westminster Presbyterian Church, and Jansi LLC (the parent company of the local LGBT newsweekly, Metro Weekly). WWC last helped to produce Capital Pride in 2008.

Capital Pride Alliance was the sole producer of the event beginning in 2009.

=== 2010s ===
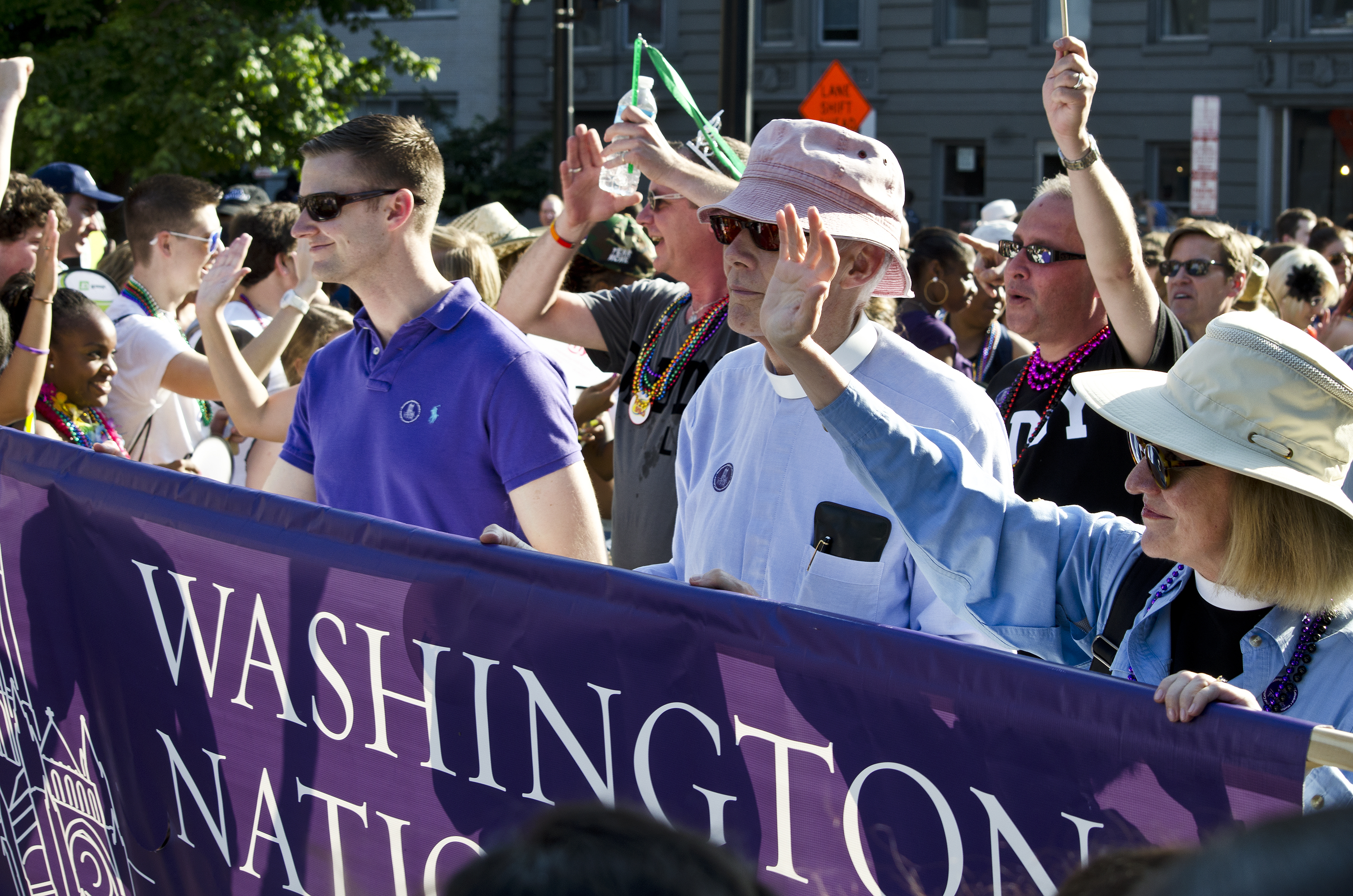
The Washington National Cathedral participated in the Capital Pride parade for the first time in 2013. The Very Rev. Gary Hall (center) and Rev. Canon Jan Naylor Cope (right) led the contingent.

The 35th anniversary of Capital Pride occurred in 2010. Organizers and affiliate organizations hosted 60 events over 10 days. According to organizers, a record attendance of more than 250,000 people turned out just for the Pride street festival.

Capital Pride continued to flourish over the next several years. Per policy, city officials and police declined to provide a crowd estimate in 2011, but event organizers said 200,000 to 250,000 people attended both the parade and the street festival. In 2012, the Capital Pride parade extended for more than 1.5 miles (2.4 km), and was expected to draw about 100,000 spectators. Although about 200,000 attendees were expected at the street festival the next day, organizers put actual attendance at about 250,000. More than 300 vendors participated in the street fest, and D.C. Latino Pride expanded to four days of events.

A contingent from the Washington National Cathedral marched in the Capital Pride parade for the first time in 2013. Leading the group of 30 staffers was the Very Reverend Gary Hall, Dean of the cathedral. The Washington Post described the cathedral group's participant as "a stunner for some". The Washington Blade reported attendance at the 2013 parade at 100,000. Changes to the parade included a turn north rather than south on 14th Street NW. The street festival started an hour later (noon), and ended an hour later (9:00 P.M.) to take advantage of the summer sunlight hours. A less positive change was a split among organizers of D.C. Latino Pride. A group of 11 organizations questioned the Latino LGBT History Project's control over and use of the event as a fundraising mechanism. They also claimed that transgender groups were being excluded from the event, and it was focused on national issues at the expense of grassroots organizing and community groups. The Latino GLBT History Project strongly denied both claims. The 11 dissenting groups split from the D.C. Latino Pride effort, and both groups of Latino organizations held competing events and parties in early June 2013.

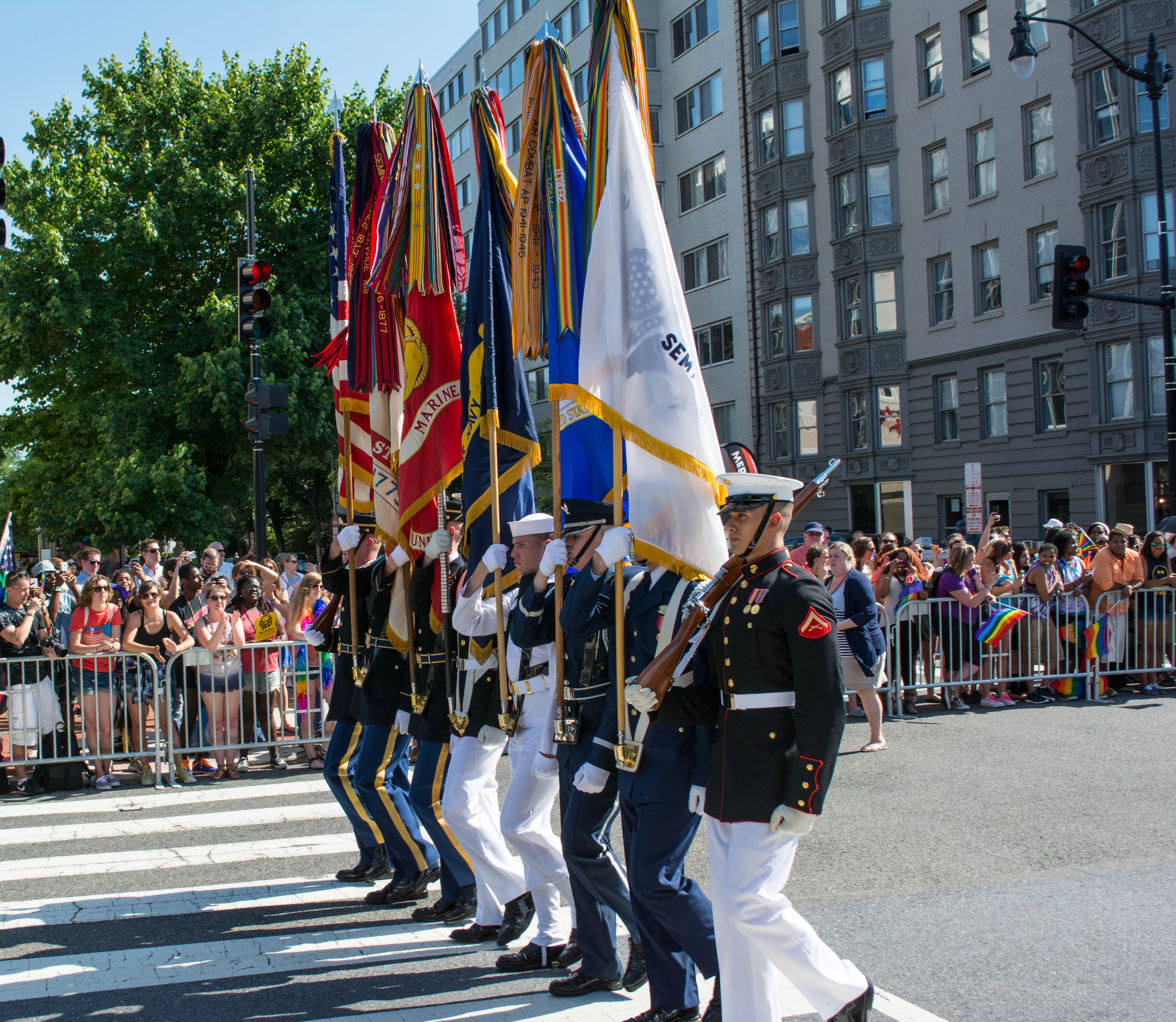
An official United States armed forces color guard leads the Capital Pride parade in 2014.

On June 7, 2014, a United States Armed Forces color guard led the way and retired the colors in the Capital Pride parade. It was the first time in American history that an officially sanctioned United States Armed Forces color guard marched in a gay pride parade. Although several gay pride parade organizers nationwide had requested a color guard since the demise of the military's "don't ask, don't tell" policy in 2011, none had ever been approved. The eight-person color guard represented each branch of the United States armed forces. The Military District of Washington provided the color guard, which also presents colors for the President of the United States, members of Congress, and at official state functions. The 2014 parade attracted more than 100,000 people, while festival organizers estimated that more than 250,000 people attended events during the entire week-long Capital Pride celebration. The 2015 parade drew roughly 150,000 people.

On June 8, 2019, reports of gunfire at the parade in Dupont Circle caused people to flee through the streets in a panic. Police responded to the scene but determined that no shots were fired; the sounds of gunshots were most likely falling crowd-control barriers. A man with a BB gun was arrested for causing the panic and for possession of an illegal weapon; he pointed the BB gun at another person in Dupont Circle who was assaulting his female "significant other", according to a police report. Seven people were hospitalized with non-life-threatening injuries from the stampede.

=== 2020s ===
No Capital Pride was held in 2020 due to the COVID-19 pandemic in Washington, D.C., and the event was conducted virtually in 2021. Capital Pride resumed in-person events in 2022, including a parade, and a festival where Vice President Kamala Harris surprised the audience.

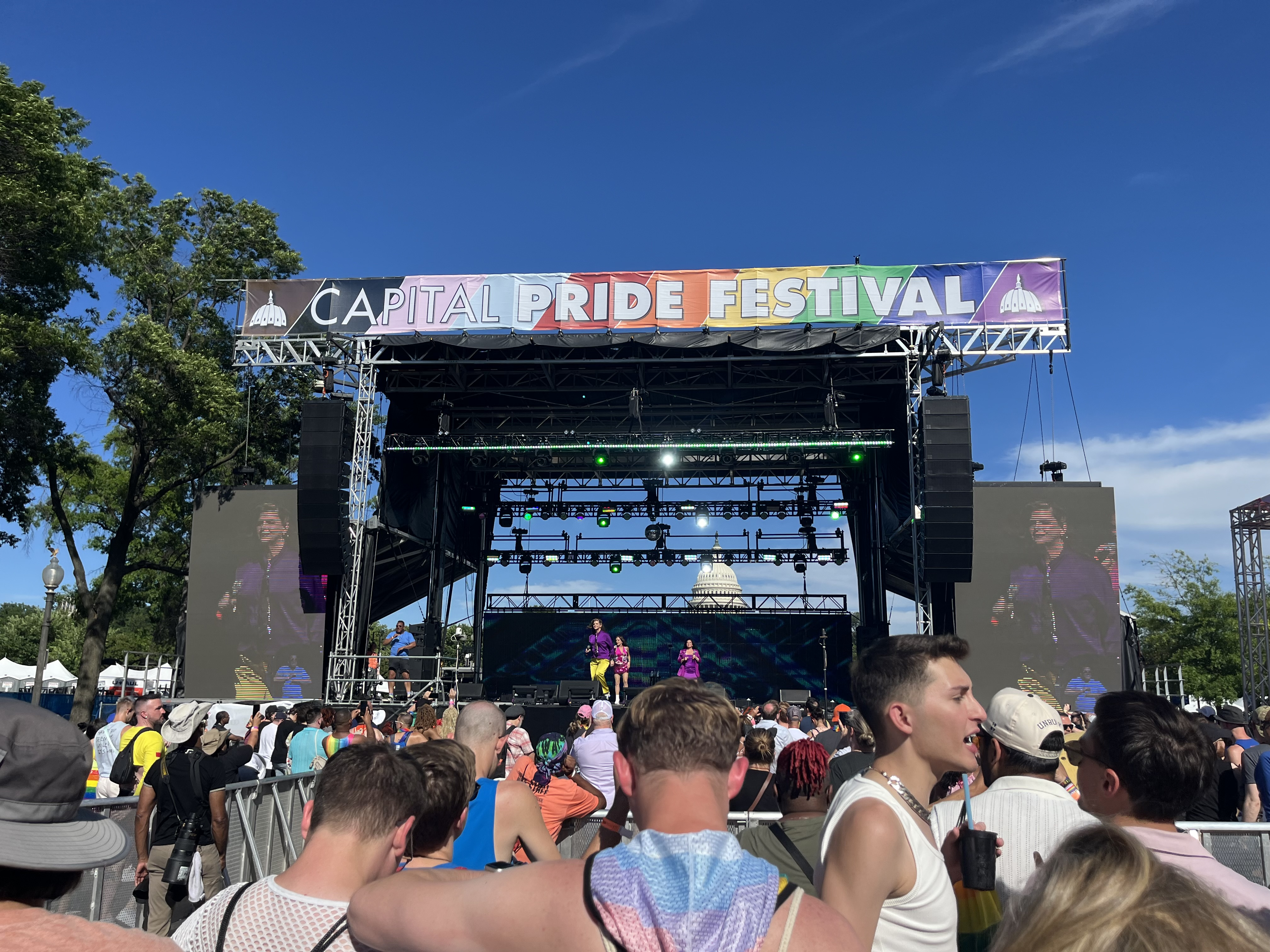
The 1980s freestyle group, Exposé, playing a set on at Capital Pride Festival on Pennsylvania Avenue in Washington, DC

== Organization ==
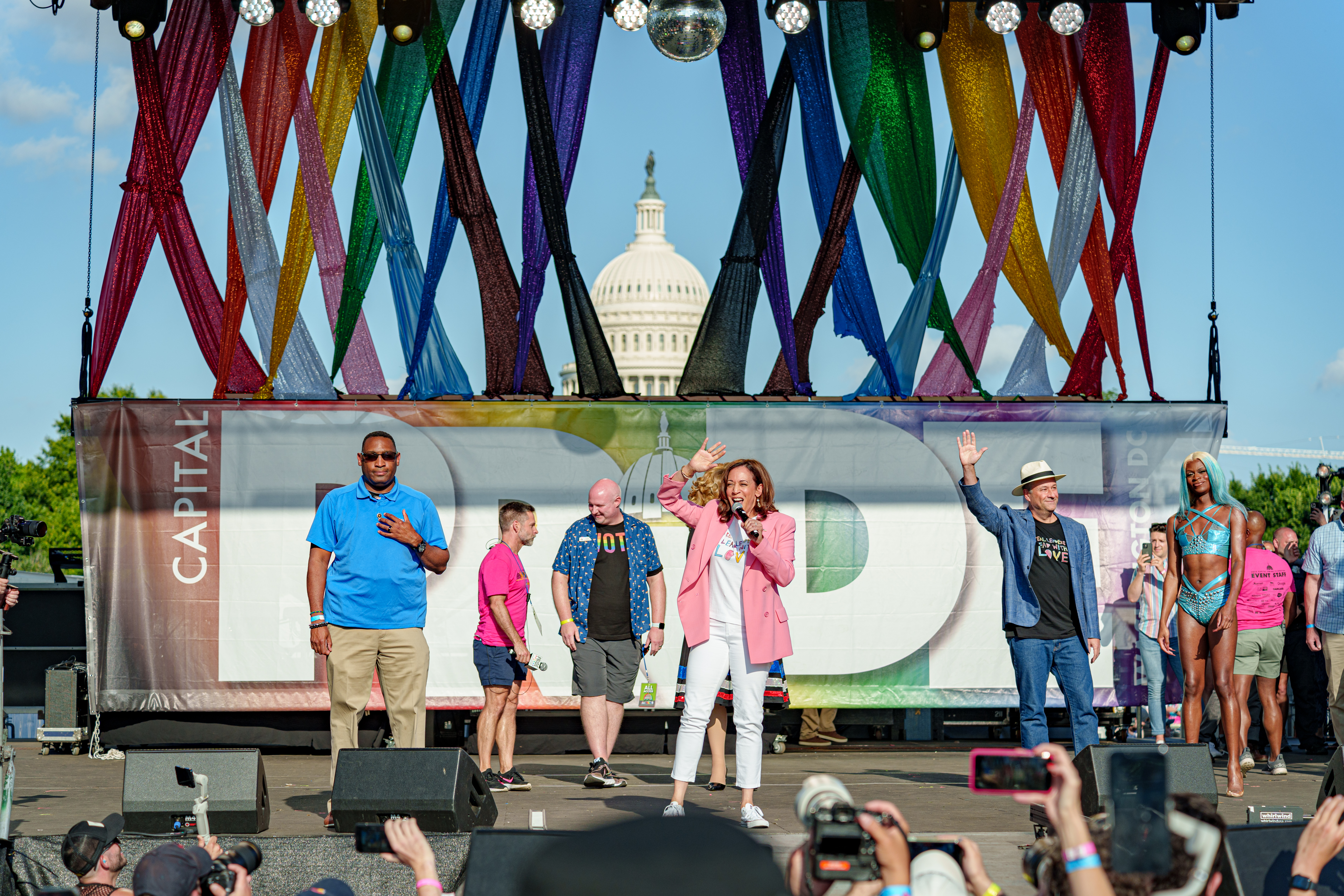
Vice President Kamala Harris and RuPaul's Drag Race Season 13 winner Symoné at the Capital Pride street festival in 2022. The dome of the U.S. Capitol building can be seen in the background.

Capital Pride was originally called Gay Pride Day. It changed its name to Gay and Lesbian Pride Day in 1981, and to Capital Pride in 2000.

The event was initially organized in 1975 by Deacon Maccubbin, owner of Lambda Rising Bookstore, with the help of the bookstore's employees, volunteers, and a part-time executive director, Bob Carpenter. Maccubbin and Lambda Rising hosted the event for the first five years of its existence, until it grew to 10,000 attendees and spread over three blocks. At that point, it became too large for the space available, so Maccubbin began looking for an alternative location. In 1980, a group of community activists incorporated as the P Street Festival Committee and Maccubbin turned the event over to that group. Financial problems and growing concerns about the organization's lack of inclusiveness led the committee to disband in 1990 in favor of a successor organization, Pride of Washington. Further financial problems led Pride of Washington to transfer the event to a local LGBT arts organization, One In Ten, in 1995. In 1997, One In Ten partnered with Whitman-Walker Clinic to co-produce the festival. Whitman-Walker Clinic became the sole sponsor in 2000.

Whitman-Walker turned the event over to a new group, the Capital Pride Alliance, in 2008. Capital Pride Alliance has continued to produce festival. Although the Capital Pride Alliance was formed by 11 organizations, it now has a self-perpetuating board of directors.

== Cultural references ==
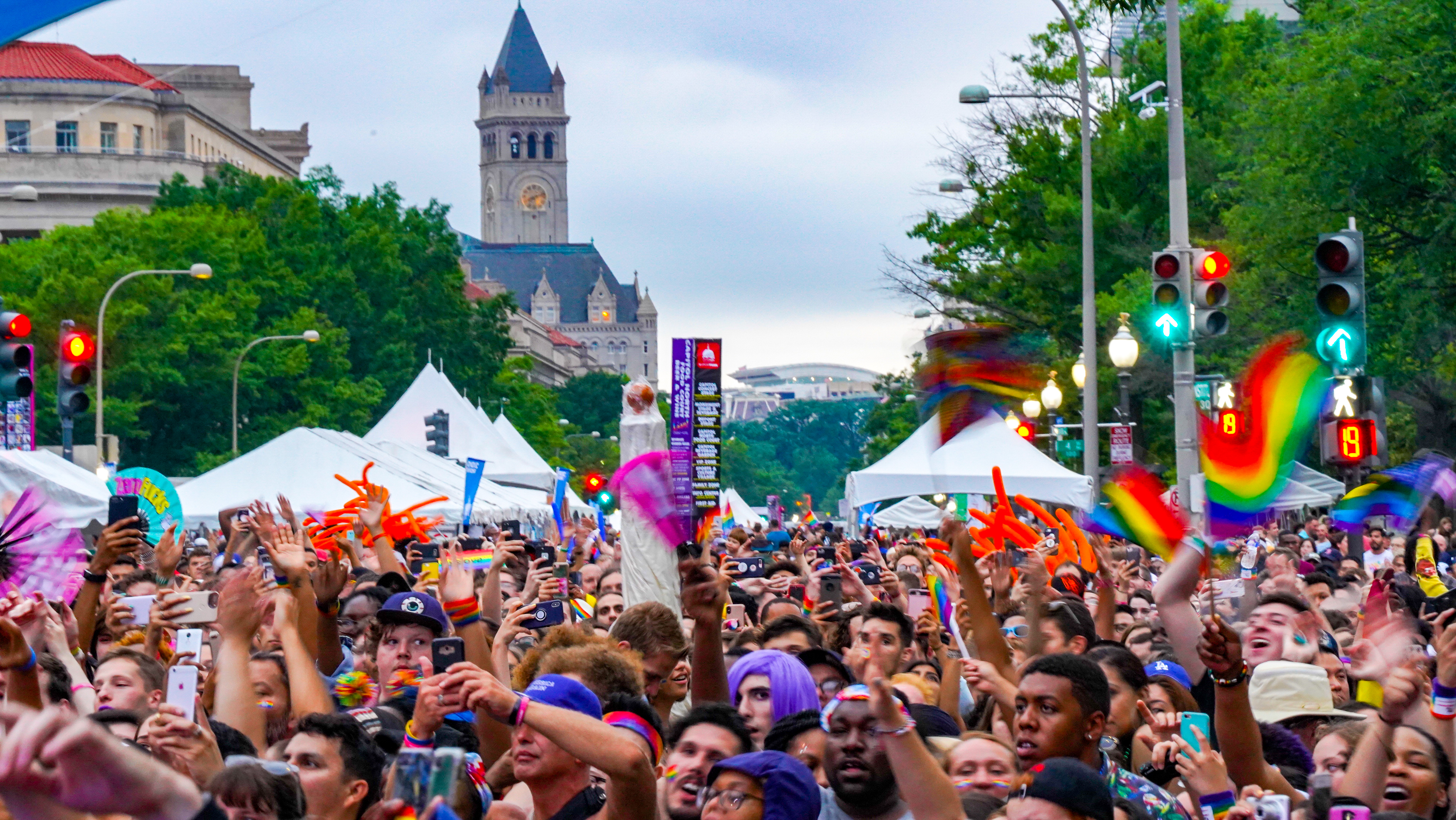
Spectators at the 2018 Capital Pride Concert.

In 2005, an exhibit at The Warehouse Gallery, an art gallery and museum in the District of Columbia, documented the history and meaning of Capital Pride for area residents. The exhibit, "Queering Sight—Queer Insight," opened on June 3, 2005, and ran for a month.

In 2006, Capital Pride was featured in the comedy film Borat: Cultural Learnings of America for Make Benefit Glorious Nation of Kazakhstan.

One In Ten sponsored a second exhibit about Capital Pride's history in 2007. The exhibit was installed at The Sumner School, a city-owned museum in a historic former school building in midtown D.C. The exhibit ran from March to June 2007.

The New York Times in May 2014 called Capital Pride one "of the more notable Pride festivals and parades around the country".

== See also ==
- Gay Men's Chorus of Washington, D.C.
- D.C. Black Pride
- LGBT rights in the District of Columbia
