= List of members of the Connecticut General Assembly from Norwalk =

This is a list of members of the Connecticut General Assembly from Norwalk, Connecticut since the founding of the settlement in 1651 to the present.

== Seventeenth century ==
Representative	Years	Note
Richard Olmsted	May 1653, October 1654, May 1658, October 1660, May 1662, May 1663, October 1663, May 1664, October 1664, October 1665, May 1666, October 1666, May 1667, May 1668, October 1668, May 1669, May 1671, May 1679	Founding settler of Norwalk
Matthew Campfield	May 1654, May 1655, May 1656, May 1657, May 1658, May 1659, May 1660, May 1661, May and October 1662, October 1663, May and October 1664, May and October 1665, and May and October 1666	Founding settler of Norwalk
Matthew Marvin, Sr.	May 1654	Founding settler of Norwalk
Richard Webb	May 1656	Founding settler of Norwalk
Samuel Hales	May and October 1656, May and October 1657 and May and October 1660	Founding settler of Norwalk
Nathaniel Ely	October 1656	Founding settler of Norwalk
Isaac Moore	October 1657	Founding settler of Norwalk
Nathaniel Richards	October 1658	Founding settler of Norwalk
Walter Hoyt	October 1658, May and October 1661, May and October 1667, October 1668, May 1670, May 1671, May 1672, October 1673, October 1674, May 1676, May 1678, October 1681	Founding settler of Norwalk
John Gregory	October 1659, October 1662, May 1663, May 1665, October 1667, May 1668, May and October 1669, October 1670, October 1671, May 1674, May 1675, October 1677, May 1679, October 1680, May 1681, October 1695	Founding settler of Norwalk
John Douglas	October 1669	
Thomas Benedict	May 1670, and May 1675	Served as Norwalk Town Clerk
Daniel Kellogg	October 1670, May 1672, October 1674, October 1675, May 1677, October 1679, May 1680, and October 1683	Founding settler of Norwalk
John Bowton	October 1671, October 1673, May 1674, May 1675, October 1676, May and October 1677, May 1678, October 1679, May 1680, May 1681, May and October 1682. May 1683, and May and October 1685	Founding settler of Norwalk
Nicholas Hoyt	October 1672	
Mark Sension	October 1672, October 1676, October 1678, May and October 1684	
Thomas Fitch	May 1673	Founding settler of Norwalk, served as Norwalk Town Clerk
John Platt	October 1678, October 1680, October 1681, May and October 1682, May and October 1683. May and October 1684, May and October 1685, May and October 1686, May 1691, October 1692, October 1694	

== Eighteenth century ==
Representative	Years	Note
Samuel Hayes	May 1686, May and October 1687, October 1689, May 1692, May and October 1693, May 1694, May 1695, May 1696, May and October 1697, May and October 1698, October 1699, May 1700, May 1701, October 1702, October 1703	
Christopher Comstock	October 1686, May 1689, and May 1690	
Thomas Seamer	May 1690	Founding settler of Norwalk
Samuel Smith	May 1691	
Andrew Messenger	May 1691, October 1696, October 1700, October 1701, May 1702	Mistakenly recorded as "Edward"
John Belding	October 1691, May 1705	
James Olmsted	October 1691, October 1692, October 1693, May 1699	Served as town clerk
Thomas Betts	May 1692, October 1694, May and October 1704, October 1705, May 1707	
Samuel Betts	May 1693, May 1710	
Matthew Marvin Jr.	May 1694, May and October 1697	Founding settler of Norwalk
Jachin Gregory	May 1695	
John Keeler	October 1698	
Samuel Keeler	October 1701, October 1703, May 1704, May 1706, May and October 1709	
Joseph Platt	May 1705, October 1706, October 1707, October 1708, October 1709, May 1710, October 1711, October 1712, October 1713, October 1714, October 1716, October 1718, May and October 1719, October 1720, May 1721, October 1722, October 1724, October 1725, October 1726, October 1727, May and October 1728, October 1729, October 1730, May and October 1731, May and October 1732, May and October 1733, October 1734, October 1737, October 1738, May 1739, May and October 1745, and October 1746	Longest serving representative from Norwalk.
Samuel Hanford	October 1705, May 1707, May 1708, May 1711, May 1714, October 1717, October 1719, May 1720, October 1722, October 1733, May and October 1735, May and October 1736, May and October 1737	Served as Norwalk Town Clerk
John Copp	May 1706, May 1716, October 1718, May 1719	served as Norwalk Town Clerk
John Betts	October 1708, May 1709, October 1710, May 1715, May 1716	
Samuel Comstock	October 1711, October 1714, May 1720, October 1723, October 1725, October 1726, October 1727, October 1728, October 1729, October 1730	
Matthew Seymour	October 1712, October 1713	
Samuel Kellogg	May 1714	
John Read	May 1715, October 1717	
John Raymond Jr.	October 1716	
John Bartlett	May 1718	
Samuel Marvin	May 1718	
James Brown	October 1720, May 1756, May 1757	
James Lockwood	May 1721, May 1722, October 1723, October 1724, May 1726, May 1727, May 1729, May and October 1732, May 1733, May and October 1735, May 1738, October 1739, May and October 1740, October 1742, May 1746, October 1748, October 1749, October 1751	
John Benedict	May 1722, May 1725	
Eliphalet Lockwood	May 1724	
Matthew Gregory	May 1724	
Thomas Fitch	May 1726, May 1727, May 1729, May 1730	Served on the Council of Assistants, and as Governor
Benjamin Hickox	May 1728	
Joseph Birchard	May 1730, May 1734	
John Betts Jr.	October 1731, October 1736, May 1739, May and October 1741, May 1742, May 1743	
John Marvin	May 1734, May 1738	
Daniel Hoyt	October 1734	
Samuel Fitch	May 1736, October 1741, May and October 1742, May 1743, May and October 1744, May and October 1745, May and October 1746, May and October 1747, May 1748, May and October 1750, May 1751, May and October 1752, October 1753, May 1754, October 1760, May 1761	
Thomas Benedict	May 1737, October 1740, October 1744	
Joseph Comstock	October 1738	
Samuel Cluckston	October 1739, May 1740	
John Belding Jr.	May 1741	
Elnathan Hanford	May and October 1747, May 1748	Served as Norwalk Town Clerk
Joseph Platt Jr.	October 1748, May and October 1749, May and October 1750, May 1751, May and October 1752, October 1753, October 1754, October 1755, October 1757, May 1758, May and October 1759, May and October 1760, May 1761, May 1762, May and October 1765, May and October 1766, October 1767, and May 1770	
Nehemiah Mead	May 1749	
David Lambert	October 1751	
James Fitch	May 1753, October 1754, May 1755, May and October 1757	
Noah Taylor	May 1753	
Theophilus Fitch	May 1754	
Peter Lockwood	October 1755, October 1761, October 1762, May and October 1763, May and October 1764	
Joseph Betts	May 1760	
Thomas Fitch, V	October 1761, May and October 1763, May and October 1764, May and October 1765, May and October 1766, May 1767, October 1768, May and October 1769, October 1770, October 1771, October 1772, October 1773, October 1775, May 1776	
Nathaniel Benedict	October 1762	
Joseph Hall	May 1767	
Asa Spalding	May 1768	
Thomas Belden	October 1768, May and October 1769, May and October 1770, May and October 1771, May and October 1772, May and October 1773, May and October 1774, May 1775, May 1787, May and October 1788, October 1789, May and October 1793	
Uriah Rogers	May 1772	
Thaddeus Betts	October 1774, October 1775, May and October 1776, May 1784, October 1785, May 1786	
Moses Comstock	May 1777	
Daniel Betts Jr.	May 1777	
Clapp Raymond	May and October 1778, October 1779, and October 1783	
Stephen St. John	May and October 1778, May and October 1780, May 1781, May and October 1782, May 1783, May and October 1784, and May 1785	
Samuel Silliman	May 1779, May 1780, October 1780, October 1781, May 1782, May 1783, October 1783, October 1784, May 1785, October 1785, October 1786, May 1787, October 1787, October 1788, May 1789, October 1789, May 1791, May 1792, October 1792, May 1794, October 1794	
Matthew Mead	May 1779, May and October 1780, May and October 1781	
James Richards	October 1779, October 1782	
Eliphalet Lockwood	May and October 1790, May and October 1791, October 1794, May and October 1795, May and October 1796	
Hezekiah Rogers	May 1786, and October 1787	Served as a delegate to the convention in Connecticut to ratify the United States Constitution in 1788
Job Bartram	May and October 1790	
Samuel Cook Comstock	October 1792, May and October 1793, October 1795	
Taylor Sherman	May 1794, May 1795, and May 1796	
Matthew Marvin	October 1796, May and October 1797, May 1798, May and October 1799	
John Cannon	May 1797	

== Nineteenth century ==
Representative	Years	Party	Note
Joseph Silliman	October 1797, May 1800, May 1801		
Roger M. Sherman	May and October 1798		
Isaac Richards	May and October 1799		
William M. Betts	May and October 1800, May and October 1801, May and October 1802, May and October 1803, October 1804, May and October 1809, May and October 1810		
Phineas Miller	October 1801, May and October 1802, May 1804		
Jabez Gregory	May and October 1804, May 1805, May and October 1806, May and October 1807, October 1808, May and October 1811, May and October 1812		
Stephen St. John	May 1805, May and October 1806		
John Hanford	October 1805		
George Raymond	October 1805, May 1807		
Stephen Lockwood	October 1807		
Moses Gregory	May 1808, 1820, 1821, 1822, 1823, 1824, 1827		Member of the Constitutional Convention of 1818
John Taylor	May and October 1808		
Jabob Osborne	May and October 1809, May and October 1810, October 1814		
Samuel Bowton	May and October 1811		
Thomas Reed	May and October 1812, May 1813, 1825, 1826		
Benjamin Isaacs	May and October 1813, May and October 1815, May and October 1816, May 1817, October 1818, 1819, 1820, 1822, 1824, 1825, 1827, 1828, 1834		Served in the Connecticut Senate, and as Norwalk Town Clerk
Moses W. Reed	October 1813, May 1814		
John Eversley	May 1814, October 1815, May 1816		Member of the Constitutional Convention of 1818
Lewis Mallory	October 1814		
Thaddeus Betts	May 1815, 1830		Served in the Connecticut Senate, as Lieutenant Governor of Connecticut, and as United States Senator
Samuel B. Warren	October 1816, 1828		
William J. Street	October 1817, May 1818		Served as a Warden of the Borough of Norwalk
Dan Taylor	May and October 1818		
Andrew Hanford	1819		
James Quintard	1821		
Noah Wilcox	1822, 1823, 1825, 1836		
David Roberts	1826, 1831		
Charles Wiley Taylor	1829, 1835		
Clark Bissell	1829, 1841, 1850		Served in the Connecticut Senate, as an Associate Justice of the Connecticut Supreme Court, and as Governor
Eli B. Bennett	1830, 1831, 1848		
John D. Loundsbury	1832, 1833		
Thomas B. Butler	1832, 1833, 1837, 1843, 1846		Served in the Connecticut Senate, as President Pro Tempore of the Connecticut Senate, as a member of the United States House of Representatives, and as Chief Justice of the Connecticut Supreme Court
Samuel Comstock	1834		
Lewis Gregory	1836, 1837, 1838		
Timothy T. Merwin	1838		
Algernon E. Beard	1839, 1840, 1844, 1845, 1850		
Joseph W. Hubbell	1839, 1840		Served as a Warden of the Borough of Norwalk
Henry Sellick	1841, 1842		
Matthew Wilcox	1842, 1843		
Charles Thomas	1844		
William S. Lockwood	1845, 1846		
Samuel Jarvis	1847		
Asa Hill	1847, 1856	American	
Harvey Pennoyer	1848		
Gould D. Jennings	1849	Democratic	
William H. Benedict	1849	Whig	
Ebenezer Hill	1851 1853, 1862, 1866	Union	
Henry M. Prowitt	1851	Whig	
Thomas Robinson	1852	Whig	
Thomas Guyer	1852, 1854, 1872, 1873, 1874	Republican	
Ira Gregory	1853	Whig	
Stephen Raymond	1854	Whig	
David Comstock Jr.	1855	Whig	
Burr Nash	1855	American	
Daniel K. Nash	1856, 1858	Republican	
Josiah Carter	1857, 1861, 1862	Republican	Served as Speaker of the Connecticut House of Representatives (1862)
William T. Craw	1857, 1859, 1860	Republican	
A. Homer Byington	1858, 1859	Republican	Served in the Connecticut Senate
Samuel E. Olmstead	1860	Republican	
Peter L. Cunningham	1861	Republican	Served as mayor of South Norwalk
William C. Street	1863, 1864	Union	Served as a Warden of the Borough of Norwalk
Joseph H. Jennings	1863	Union	
Chester F. Tolles	1864, 1865	Union	
Frederick St. John Lockwood	1865, 1866, 1872	Republican	
Asa Woodward	1867, 1868	Republican	Served as a Warden of the Borough of Norwalk, and in the Connecticut Senate
D.H. Webb	1867	Republican	
George S. Bell	1868	Republican	
Asa Smith	1869	Democratic	
Israel Bullock	1869	Republican	
Martin Craw	1870, 1871	Republican	
Talmadge Baker	1870, 1877, 1881	Republican	Served in the Connecticut Senate
Lewis Beers	1871	Republican	
Moses Hill	1873	Republican	
Edward P. Weed	1874, 1878	Democratic	Served as a Warden of the Borough of Norwalk
James W. Hyatt	1875, 1876	Democratic	Served as a Warden of the Borough of Norwalk, in the Connecticut Senate, and as Treasurer of the United States
Winfield S. Hanford	1875, 1876	Democratic	Served as mayor of South Norwalk
Allen Betts	1877, 1878	Republican	
James G. Gregory	1879	Republican	Served as a Warden of the Borough of Norwalk
Robert Rowan	1879, 1880, 1895	Republican	
Charles H. Street	1880	Republican	
George R. Cowles	1881, 1882, 1883, 1884	Republican	
Charles W. Bell	1882, 1883, 1884	Republican	
George Brady	1887	Republican	
John H. Ferris	1887, 1889	Republican	
Frank Comstock	1891, 1893	Republican	
Edwin O. Keeler	1893, 1895	Republican	Served as mayor of Norwalk, as President Pro Tempore of the Connecticut Senate and as Lieutenant Governor of Connecticut
Russell Frost	1897	Republican	
Belden Hurlbutt	1897	Republican	

== Twentieth century ==
Representative	Years	Party	Note
John H. Light	1899, 1901	Republican	Served as Speaker of the Connecticut House of Representatives (1901)
Elbert Adams	1901	Republican	
Wallace Dann	1903	Democratic	Served as mayor of Norwalk
Jeremiah Donovan	1903	Democratic	Served as mayor of Norwalk, in the Connecticut Senate, and in the United States House of Representatives
Mortimer M. Lee	1905	Republican	Served as mayor of South Norwalk
William Low	1907	Democratic	
Fredrick Quintard	1907	Republican	
Marcel Bennett	1909	Republican	
Henry Matheis	1911, 1913	Democratic	
Carl Anderson	1911	Democratic	
Harry Rider	1913	Progressive Republican	
Cramer Hegeman	1915	Republican	
Nehemiah Candee	1917, 1919	Republican	
Harvey Kent	1921, 1925	Republican	
Frank Gregory	1923	Republican	
Lewis H. Nash	1923	Republican	
Freeman Light	1925, 1927, 1929	Republican	
Emil Hemming	1927, 1929	Republican	
Samuel Aller	1931	Democratic	
Edward Gans	1933	Republican	
Daniel Deering	1935	Republican	
Patrick Lyden	1937	Democratic	
Elbert Clark	1937	Democratic	
William Garafalo	1939	Republican	
Sara Maschal	1939	Republican	First woman to represent Norwalk
Fred Buckley	1941, 1943	Democratic	Unseated by Republican in contested election (1943)
John Cavanaugh	1941	Democratic	
Stanley Stroffolino	1943, 1945	Republican	
George Sartain	1945	Republican	
Louis Lamaire	1947, 1949, 1951	Republican	
Louis Padula	1947, 1955, 1957, 1959, 1961, 1963, 1965, 1973	Republican	
John Shostak	1957, 1959, 1963, 1965	Republican	Served as mayor of Norwalk
Frank Raymond	1949, 1951, 1953	Republican	
Fannie Harris	1953, 1955	Republican	
John Vallerie	1961	Republican	

=== Creation of districts (1967) ===
The January 1967 regular session was the first in which its members were elected by district.

Representative	Years	Party	District	Note
Thomas Tierney	1967	Democratic	140th	
Bernard Breeman	1967	Republican	149th	
Howard Newman	1967, 1969, 1971, 1973	Democratic	146th	
E. Ronald Bard	1967, 1969, 1971, 1973	Republican	145th, 138th	
Otha Brown Jr.	1967, 1969, 1971	Democratic	148th	
John Fabrizio	1969, 1971, 1973	Republican	140th	
William J. Lyons Jr.	1971	Republican	149th	
William A. Collins	1975, 1977	Democratic	140th	
John McGuirk	1975, 1979	Democratic	139th	
William Lawless	1975, 1977	Democratic	137th	
Lawrence Anastasia	1975, 1977, 1979, 1981, 1983, 1985, 1987, 1989, 1991	Democratic	138th	
Edward Zamm	1977	Republican	139th	
Thomas C. O'Connor	1978	Republican	140th	Filled the unexpired term of William Collins in a special election
John Atkin	1979, 1981, 1983	Democratic	140th	
Andrew Glickson	1979	Democratic	137th	
Frank Esposito	1981, 1983, 1985, 1987	Republican	137th	
Jacob Rudolf	1981, 1985	Republican	139th	
Janet M. Mills	1985	Republican	140th	Defeated in general election
Douglas Mintz	1987, 1989, 1991	Democratic	140th	Resigned in 1992, upon appointment as judge of the Superior Court
Alex Knopp	1987, 1989, 1991, 1993, 1995, 1997, 1999	Democratic	139th, 137th	Redistricted from the 139th District to the 137th District. Served as mayor of Norwalk (2001)
Sally Bolster	1988, 1989, 1991	Republican	137th	Bolster's residence was redistricted into a newly formed 141st district with part of Darien. She ran against incumbent Reginald L. Jones Jr. as a Democrat but was defeated.
Donnie Sellers	1993, 1995	Democratic	140th	Resigned due to conviction of bribery

== Twenty-first century ==
Representative	Years	Party	District	Note
Lawrence F. Cafero	1993, 1995, 1997, 1999, 2001, 2003, 2005, 2007, 2009, 2011, 2013	Republican	142nd	
Joseph Clemmons	1997, 1999, 2001	Democratic	140th	
Bob Duff	2001, 2003	Democratic	137th	Elected to the Connecticut Senate's 25th District
Joseph Mann	2003, 2005	Democratic	140th	
Chris Perone	2005, 2007, 2009, 2011, 2013	Democratic	137th	
Bruce Morris	2007, 2009, 2011, 2013	Democratic	140th	
Friedrich Wilms	2015	Republican	142nd	

== See also ==
- Connecticut's 137th assembly district
- Connecticut's 138th assembly district
- Connecticut's 139th assembly district
- Connecticut's 140th assembly district
- Connecticut's 141st assembly district
- Connecticut's 142nd assembly district
- Connecticut's 145th assembly district
- Connecticut's 12th Senate district
- Connecticut's 25th Senate district
- History of Norwalk, Connecticut
- List of mayors of Norwalk, Connecticut
