= Representative Comstock =

Representative Comstock may refer to:

- Barbara Comstock (1959-), U.S. Representative from Virginia
- Solomon Comstock (1842–1933), U.S. Representative from Minnesota
- Daniel Webster Comstock (1840–1917), U.S. Representative from Indiana
- Joseph Comstock, member of the House of Representatives of the Colony of Connecticut
- Frank Comstock (politician) (1856–1914), Connecticut state Representative
- Samuel Comstock (1680–1752), Connecticut state Representative

== See also ==
- Comstock (surname)
