= John Raymond =

John Raymond may refer to:

== People ==
- John Raymond Jr. (1665–1737), Connecticut representative
- John B. Raymond (1844–1886), Dakota Territory delegate
- John Howard Raymond (1814–1878), American university president
- John T. Raymond (1836–1887), American stage actor
- John R. Raymond, administrator at Medical College of Wisconsin
- John W. Raymond (born 1962), U.S. Space Force general
- John Raymond (MP for Reading) in 1529, MP for Reading
- John Raymond (died 1560), MP for Maldon
- John Raymond (died 1782), British Member of Parliament for Weymouth and Melcombe Regis
- John Raymond (comics), fictional character and alter ego of the DC Comics hero Web.
- John Raymond (Survivor contestant), American contestant of Survivor: Thailand

== Other ==
- John Raymond science fiction magazines, published by John Raymond between 1952 and 1954
