= Party conference =

General meeting of a political party

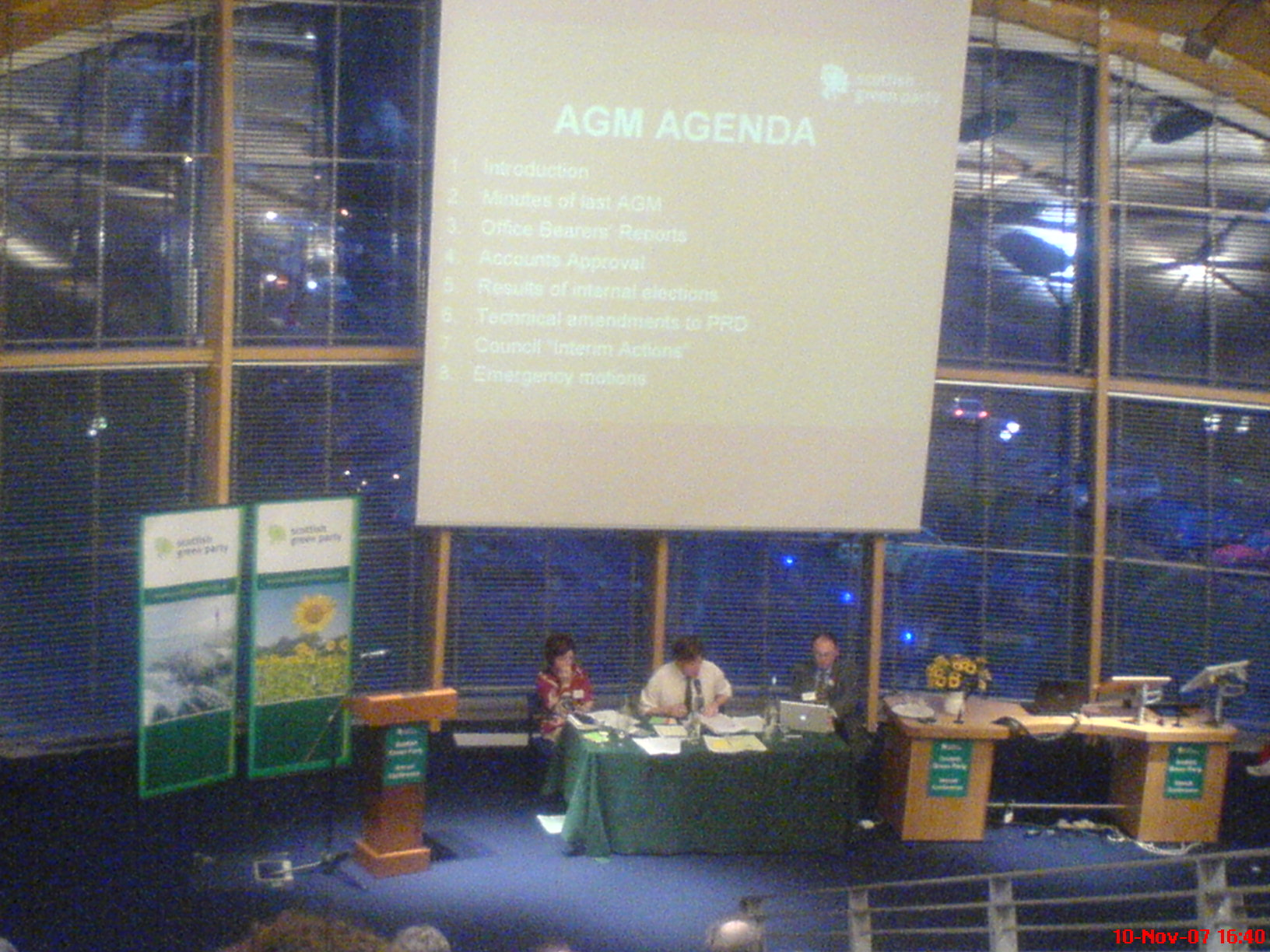
The chairman's table at the Scottish Green Party's Autumn conference in November 2007. Note the agenda displayed on the screen behind.

The terms party conference (UK English), political convention (US and Canadian English), and party congress usually refer to a general meeting of a political party. The conference is attended by certain delegates who represent the party membership. In most political parties, the party conference is the highest decision-making body of the organization, tasked with electing or nominating the party's leaders or leadership bodies, deciding party policy, and setting the party's platform and agendas.

The definitions of all of these terms vary greatly, depending on the country and situation in which they are used. The term conference or caucus may also refer to the organization of all party members as a whole. The term political convention may also refer to international bilateral or multilateral meetings on state-level, like the convention of the Anglo-Russian Entente (1907).

== Leadership roles ==
Within party conferences, there might be different offices or bodies fulfilling certain tasks, usually including:

- Chairmanship — Chosen from within the body's membership to preside over its business.
- Secretary — Responsible for keeping minutes of the conference's proceedings.
- Policy committees — Responsible for setting and maintaining review of current party policy, and preparing proposals for presentation to the full conference.

== Party conferences around the world ==
=== Canada ===
In Canada, besides annual or biennial conventions, parties often hold special conventions to elect new leaders; often known as a leadership convention. The new leader of a party is often seen as that party's de facto candidate for Prime Minister (as the party leader almost always goes on to serve as Prime Minister should their party get elected to a majority government).

=== Communist states ===
- Communist parties convene a congress to elect a Central Committee, which in turn sets up a Politburo and a Secretariat.
- A Communist conference may also meet on occasion, to discuss a particular issue or plan an event, but would have no such official powers.

=== Germany ===
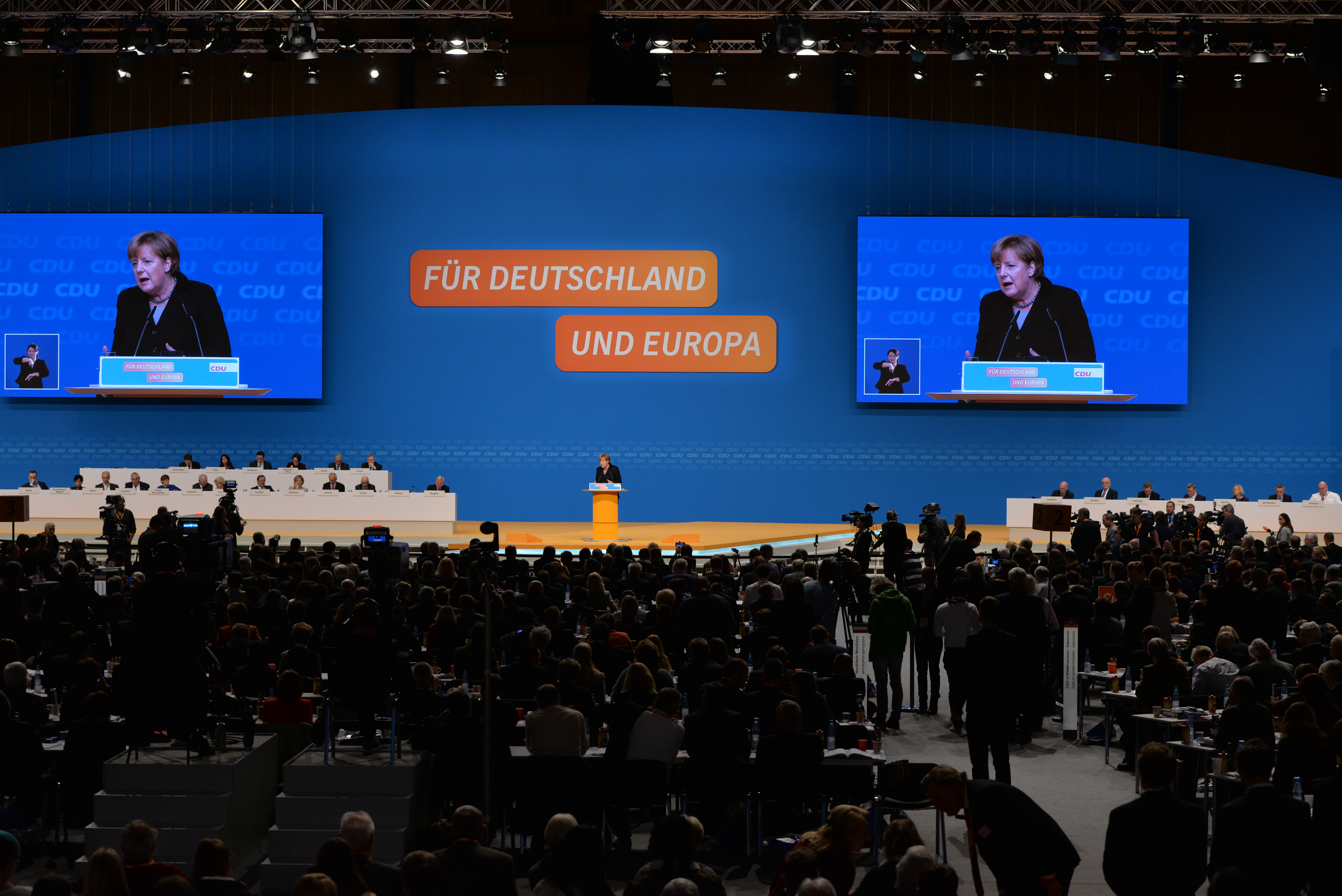
Federal party diet (Bundesparteitag) 2015 of the German CDU, with Angela Merkel speaking

Party conferences in Germany (both on state and federal level), called Parteitag ("party diet"), will meet not only to nominate candidates for public elections, but also regularly (at least once a year) to adopt political resolutions, select party officials or to amend their statutes. Generally, the party organizations themselves and also their representatives (such as the chairperson, called party leader, and other board members) play a much more prominent role in German politics than they do for example in the US or UK, where the parties are mainly represented by their members and leaders in parliament or (if applicable) government.

=== Ireland ===
All Irish parties have annual party conferences, called Ardfheiseanna, at which party policy is decided by the membership and the party chairperson and executive board are elected.

=== Kazakhstan ===
In Kazakhstan, the highest decision-making body of a political party is its congress (съезд, sezd), as defined by the Law on Political Parties (2002). Under this law, a party must be founded through a congress and must adopt its charter, programme, and governing structure at that meeting. The law also requires parties to establish internal bodies and procedures in their charters, including how leadership is elected and how decisions—such as candidate selection—are made.

At the regional and city level, parties operate through territorial branches, which hold conferences (конференция, konferentsiia) or general meetings in accordance with their charters. These bodies serve as the top authority for local organizations and may elect branch leaders or select candidates for mäslihat elections, depending on the party’s internal rules.

In practice, major parties frequently convene extraordinary congresses (кезектен тыс съезд, kezekten tys sezd), a term used in party statutes rather than in law, to approve electoral lists, leadership changes, or strategic decisions ahead of national elections. For example, the ruling Amanat party held an extraordinary congress on 1 March 2022 to adopt its rebranding and elect new leadership.

=== United Kingdom ===
In the United Kingdom the political conferences (usually called party congress, or party conference) generally take place in three weeks of September and October of each year, whilst the House of Commons is in recess. The conferences of the three largest UK-wide parties, the Conservative Party Conference, the Labour Party Conference and the Liberal Democrat Conference, are held during this time.

=== United States ===
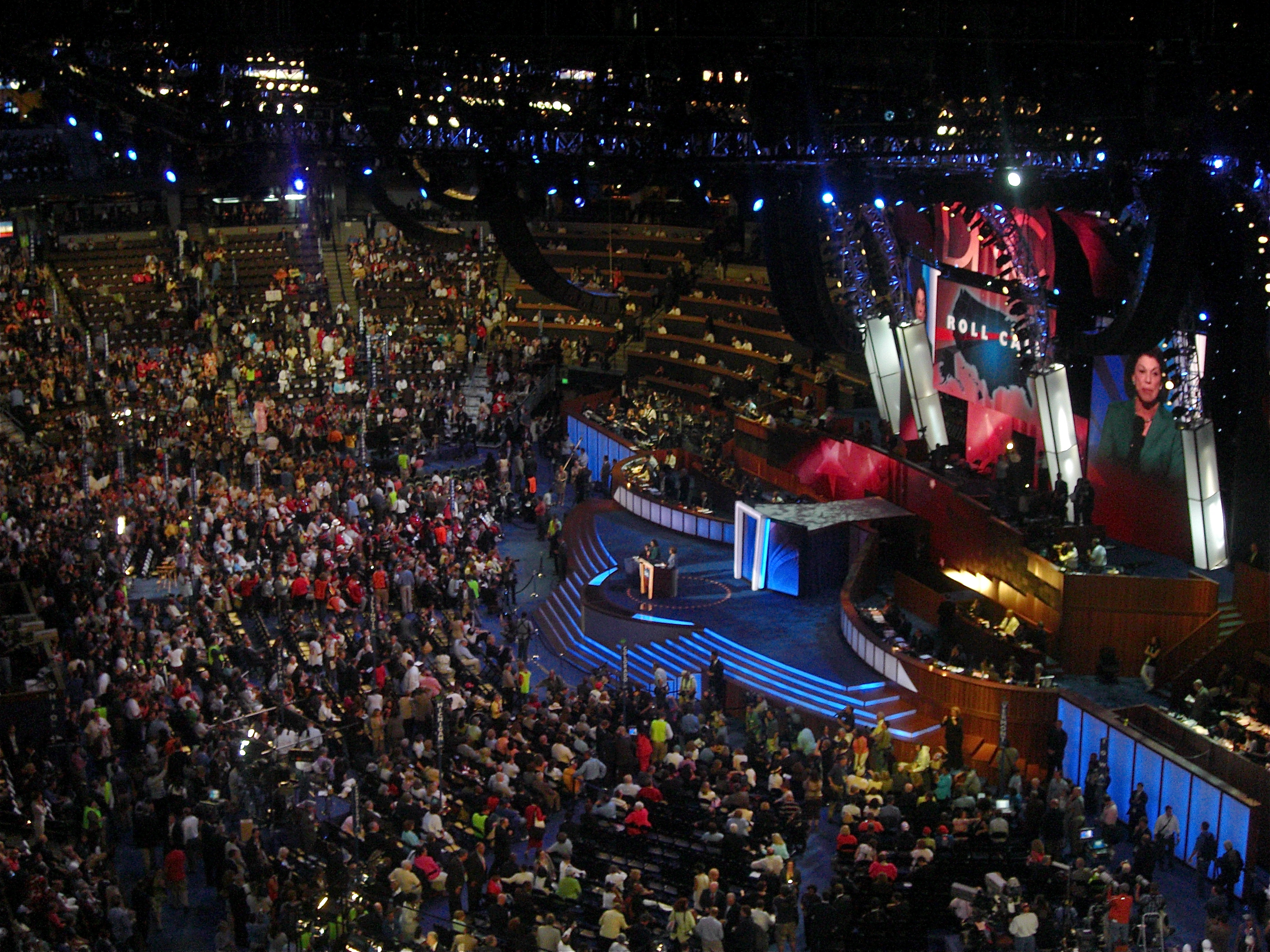
Roll call of states during the 2008 Democratic National Convention at the Pepsi Center in Denver, Colorado

In the United States, a political convention usually refers to a presidential nominating convention, but it can also refer to state, county, or congressional district nominating conventions in which candidates are nominated (or, if being held before a primary, and endorsed), delegates to larger regional or national conventions are elected and the party platform is adopted. Since the mid 19th century, the two major conventions on national level are the Democratic National Convention and the Republican National Convention, usually held every four years to select their candidates for the offices of president and vice president. They are attended by delegates, who are mostly elected in primaries.

Between the national conventions, the national committee of each party (see DNC and RNC) leads the party administratively, while they are politically represented by their leaders in Senate and in the House, or (if applicable) by the president. However, some party charters also provide for party conferences to be held between two national conventions to deal with various matters. In fact, those and the national committees can be compared to regular party conventions in other countries.

The first political convention held in America took place in Hartford, Connecticut in March 1766. The meeting was organized by the Sons of Liberty, who, in challenging incumbent governor Thomas Fitch, nominated William Pitkin for governor and Jonathan Trumbull for deputy governor.

Within the Republican Party, the term party conference is used to refer to the equivalent of caucuses or parliamentary groups in other countries (see also congressional caucus).

== See also ==
- Political party
- Lists of political parties
- Party leader
