= John Marvin (politician) =

American politician (1678–1776)

Member of the House of Representatives of the Colony of Connecticut from Norwalk
- In office May 1734 – October 1734 Serving with Joseph Birchard
- Preceded by: Joseph Platt, Samuel Hanford
- Succeeded by: Joseph Platt, Daniel Hoyt
- In office May 1738 – October 1738 Serving with James Lockwood
- Preceded by: Joseph Platt, Samuel Hanford
- Succeeded by: Joseph Platt, Joseph Comstock

Personal details
- Born: September 2, 1678 Norwalk, Connecticut Colony
- Died: February 2, 1776 (aged 97) Sharon, Connecticut Colony
- Spouse(s): Mary Beers Marvin (m. March 22, 1704, d. April 17, 1720), Rachel St. John (daughter of Matthias St. John and Rachel Bouton, m. April 27, 1721)
- Children: John Marvin, Jr., Nathan Marvin, Seth Marvin, David Marvin, Elizabeth Marvin Jarvis, Mary Marvin Scudder Judson, Elihu Marvin; Hannah Marvin Hitchcock, Joseph Marvin, Rachel Marvin, Benjamin Marvin, Rachel Marvin Sears Holley, Ann Marvin Swain Gray

Military service
- Rank: sergeant

John Marvin (September 2, 1678–February 2, 1776) was a member of the House of Representatives of the Colony of Connecticut from Norwalk in the sessions of May 1734, and May 1738.

== Biography ==
John Marvin was the son of Matthew Marvin, Jr. and Mary Brush.

In 1708, he was appointed town collector of the town of Norwalk.

On December 14, 1711, he was chosen surveyor of highways.

On December 18, 1712, he was on a committee to obtain a teacher for the school.

He was chosen as a selectman in 1706, 1713 and 1719.

He served as a constable in 1717.

He served as fence viewer in 1721 and 1729.

He served as a "lyster," in 1724.

In 1734 and 1738 he represented Norwalk in the General Assembly. In 1718, he, along with others was chosen to lay before "a wise and judicious committee" the "surcomstances of ye town in their present differences respecting the meeting-house." In 1734, along with Joseph Platt, he was appointed to lay out the land granted by the town "in ye plain before Lt. Lee's door," for St. Paul's Church.

On November 18, 1737, he gave a lot of land eight rods square to the "Presbiterian or Congregational church of Wilton, on which to erect a meetinghouse." He confirmed this by deed on May 6, 1738, in which he said "among the congregation are some of my children," naming his son John as one.

On January 21, 1752, he bought for £2400 the farm previously owned by his son John in Sharon, and settled there not long afterward.

Preceded by Joseph Platt; Samuel Hanford	Member of the House of Representatives of the Colony of Connecticut from Norwalk; With: Joseph Birchard	Succeeded by Joseph Platt; Daniel Hoyt
Preceded by Joseph Platt; Samuel Hanford	Member of the House of Representatives of the Colony of Connecticut from Norwalk; With: James Lockwood	Succeeded by Joseph Platt; Joseph Comstock
