= Mill Hill Historic Park =

Museum complex in Norwalk, Connecticut

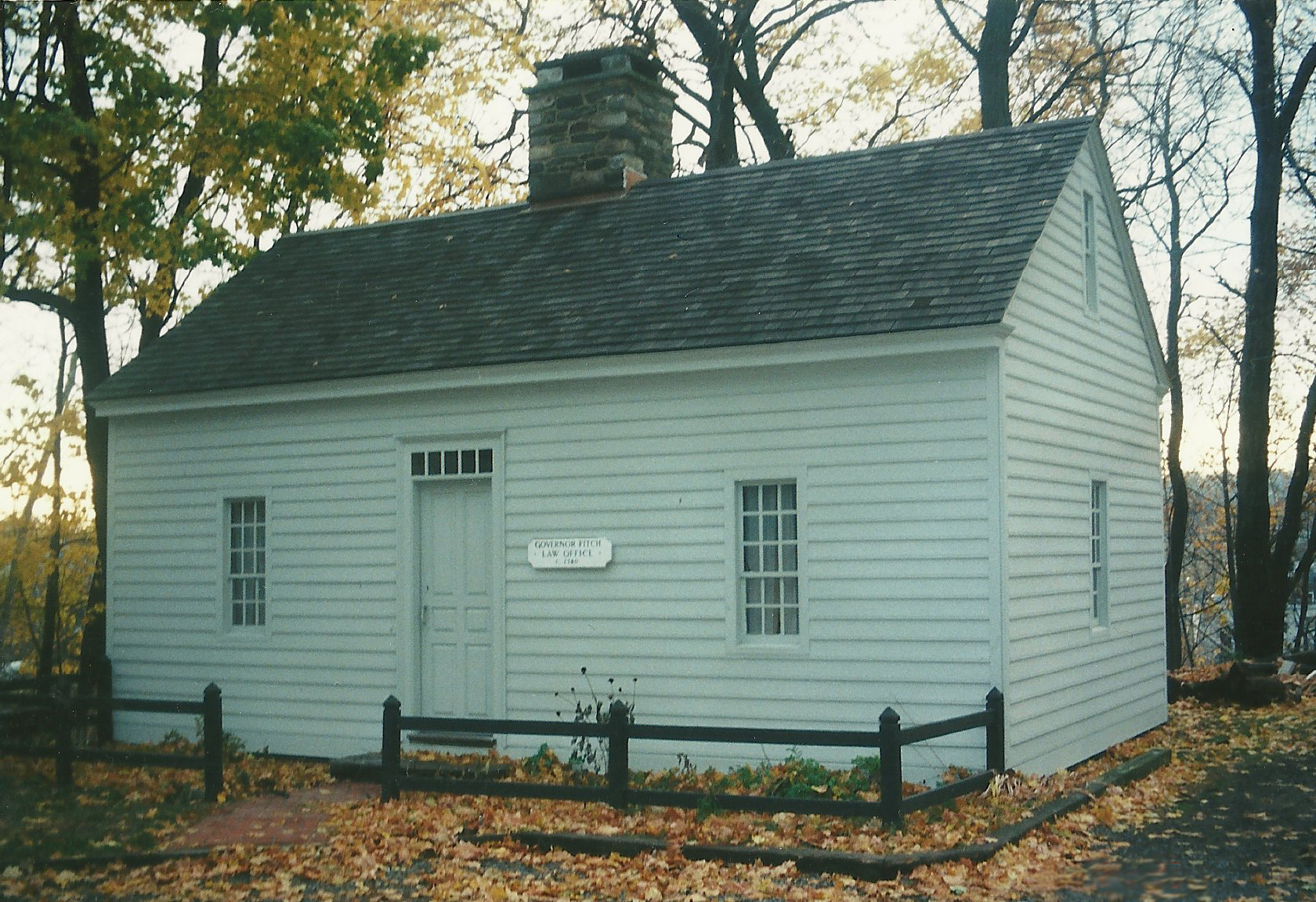
- Fitch law office building ca. 1740
- Interactive map of Mill Hill Historic Park

Details
- Established: 1767
- Location: 2 Wall Street; Norwalk, Connecticut
- Country: United States of America United States
- Coordinates: 41°07′03″N 73°24′34″W
- Type: Historic site
- Website: Mill Hill Historic Park
- Find a Grave: Mill Hill Historic Park

Mill Hill Historic Park in Norwalk, Connecticut, is a living history museum composed of three buildings: the circa 1740 Governor Thomas Fitch IV "law office", the c. 1826 Downtown District Schoolhouse, and the 1835 Norwalk Town Hall; as well as a historic cemetery also called the Town House Hill Cemetery. The museum is also known as the Mill Hill Historical Complex in some references and the sign at the parking lot reads Norwalk Mill Hill Museum.

The Mill Hill Park is now maintained by the Norwalk Historical Society and the Norwalk-Village Green Chapter of the Daughters of the American Revolution.

Mill Hill Park can be found located along East Wall Street, bounded by Hubble Lane on its southeast and Smith Street to its southwest in Central Norwalk. “The burial ground on Mill Hill called Whitney's Hill in the records, after the miller[?], was opened for the use of members of the First Society (Congregational) in 1767.” The burying ground, which is now the third oldest in Norwalk, was established by the First Congregational church in 1767. There are 11 veterans of the American Revolutionary War buried in the Mill Hill Burying Ground.

== Governor Thomas Fitch Law Office ==
The original Fitch house was constructed around 1740 on Goodman Hoyt Hill (which was later known as Earl's Hill) on the east side of what is now East Avenue. Governor Thomas Fitch died on July 18, 1774, and the house was left to his survivors including his wife Hannah and son Thomas Fitch, V (of Yankee Doodle fame). The Fitch family house was partially burned in the British raid of Norwalk on July 11 and 12, 1779 since Hannah Fitch, of tory inclinations, had vacated the town of Norwalk to avoid the raid (the British spared only tory properties in their raid). Fitch descendants lived in the house that was reconstructed after the raid until 1945. In 1956 the portion of the Fitch house that survived the British raid was saved when Earls' Hill was removed to make room for the construction of the Connecticut Turnpike and moved to Mill Hill. In 1971 the Fitch house remnant was restored to look like an 18th-century law office such as what Governor Fitch would have used.

== Downtown District Schoolhouse ==
The first schoolhouse in Norwalk constructed for that purpose was built around 1678 located near what had served as the Roger Ludlow School in East Norwalk (that building is now an apartment to the northeast of the East Norwalk Historical Cemetery). Several other school buildings were constructed, including one that was likely burned in the British raid of 1779.

The schoolhouse at the Mill Hill site was constructed around 1826 near a former southern intersection of Willow Street and East Avenue. The school became known as the Down Town district schoolhouse since "Down Town District" was the name used for what is now called East Norwalk until about 1883 or 1893. The building was used as a school until 1876. Over the subsequent years it was moved several times as neighboring property boundaries were altered. When Interstate 95 was built through East Norwalk the schoolhouse was moved to Mill Hill.

== Norwalk Town House ==
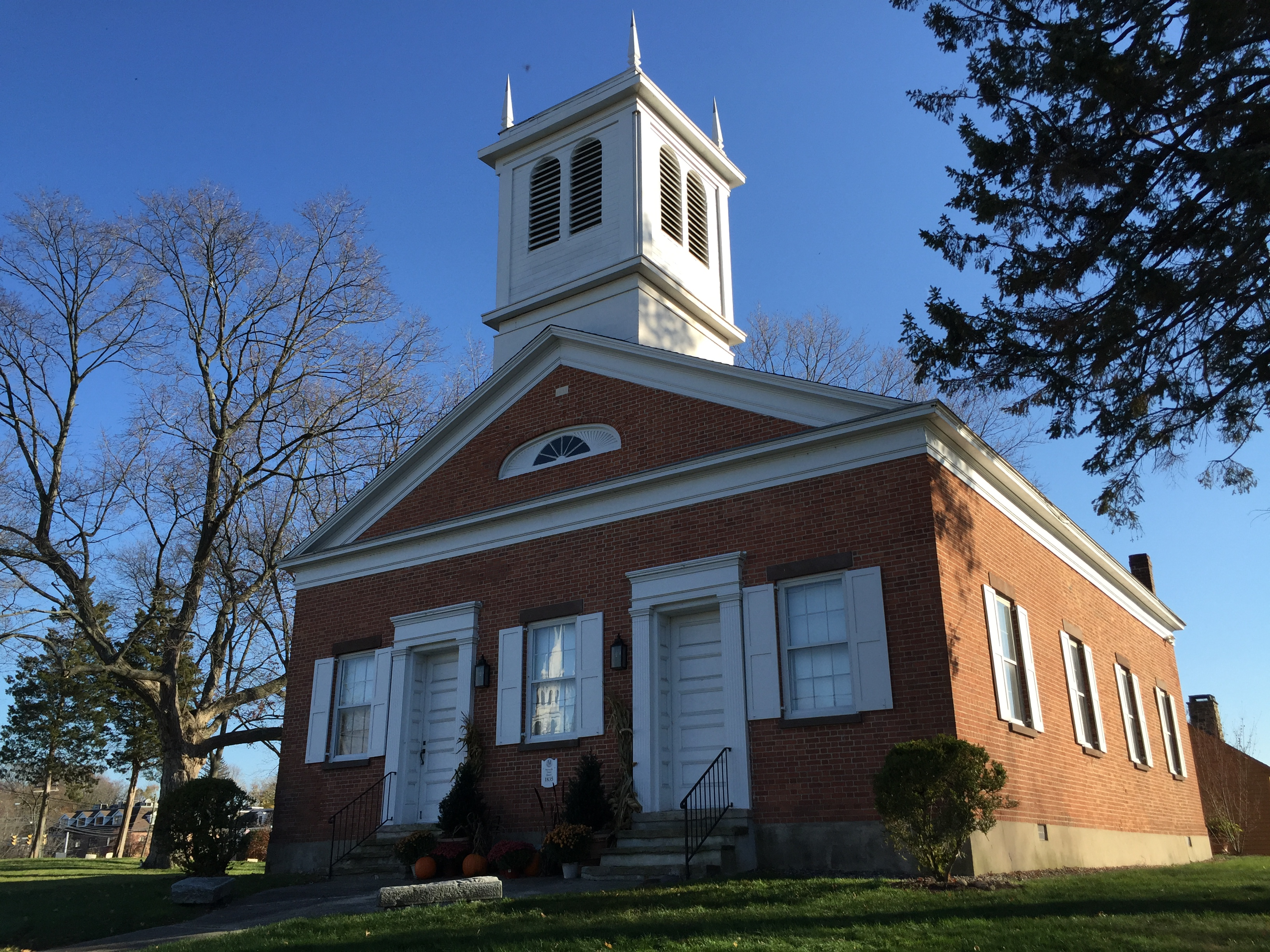
Norwalk Town House

At the founding of the Town of Norwalk in 1651 plans were made to construct a meeting house which was done by 1659. That original meeting house also served as the Congregational church. By about 1726 the town's Congregationalists requested that civic meetings be held outside of the church. Civic leaders at first complied with the request by holding meetings in various private homes and then eventually in the Up Town District School (near St. Paul's on the Green, but since relocated). By 1736 the first "Town House" for Norwalk was constructed at the site of where the Trolley Barn is located at Wall Street and Knight Street. The next Town House was built on the Mill Hill site but that building was burned in the 1779 British raid. In the aftermath of the burning Colonel Thomas Fitch V and other community members were appointed to a committee to plan the reconstruction of the Norwalk Town House, but the task was not completed until 1794. The 1794 Town House was not kept in good repair and by 1834 was such an embarrassment that it was torn down by vandals.

The present Town House at Mill Hill was built in 1835 by Captain Lewis Raymond, who had brought brick to Norwalk as ship ballast. It was possibly the third or fourth building in town constructed of brick. This Town House served the Town of Norwalk until the city-town consolidation that took effect June 30, 1913. Town business then moved to South Norwalk’s City Hall (which eventually became a museum too).

The Norwalk Chapter of the Daughters of the American Revolution leased the Mill Hill Town House building beginning in 1924 and added a kitchen and bathroom at the rear of the building along with a basement.

Today the Town House continues to be used for displays of historic memorabilia, meetings, social occasions, and educational programs including visits by schoolchildren.

== Notable burials ==
- Eliphalet Lockwood (1675–1753), deacon and member of the Connecticut House of Representatives
- John Betts, Jr. (1692–1767), member of the Connecticut House of Representatives
- Thaddeus Betts (1724–1807), physician and member of the Connecticut House of Representatives
- Taylor Sherman (1758–1815), member of the Connecticut House of Representatives, grandfather of General Sherman.
- Edwin Lockwood (1799–1878), Warden of the Borough of Norwalk

== See also ==
- History of Norwalk, Connecticut
- East Norwalk Historical Cemetery
- Pine Island Cemetery
