= James Lockwood (Connecticut politician) =

American politician

Member of the Connecticut House of Representatives from Norwalk
- In office May 1721 – October 1721 Serving with Joseph Platt
- Preceded by: Joseph Platt, James Brown
- In office May 1722 – October 1722 Serving with John Benedict
- Succeeded by: Joseph Platt, Samuel Hanford
- In office October 1723 – May 1724 Serving with Samuel Comstock
- Succeeded by: Eliphalet Lockwood, Matthew Gregory
- In office October 1724 – May 1725 Serving with Joseph Platt
- Preceded by: Eliphalet Lockwood, Matthew Gregory
- Succeeded by: John Benedict
- In office May 1726 – October 1726 Serving with Thomas Fitch
- Preceded by: Joseph Platt, Samuel Comstock
- Succeeded by: Joseph Platt, Samuel Comstock
- In office May 1727 – October 1727 Serving with Thomas Fitch
- Preceded by: Joseph Platt, Samuel Comstock
- Succeeded by: Joseph Platt, Samuel Comstock
- In office May 1729 – October 1729 Serving with Thomas Fitch
- Preceded by: Joseph Platt, Samuel Comstock
- Succeeded by: Joseph Platt, Samuel Comstock
- In office May 1732 – October 1733 Serving with Joseph Platt
- Preceded by: Joseph Platt, John Betts Jr.
- Succeeded by: Joseph Platt, Samuel Hanford
- In office May 1735 – May 1736 Serving with Samuel Hanford
- Preceded by: Joseph Platt, Daniel Hoyt
- Succeeded by: Samuel Hanford, Samuel Fitch
- In office May 1738 – October 1738 Serving with John Marvin
- Preceded by: Joseph Platt, Samuel Hanford
- Succeeded by: Joseph Platt, Joseph Comstock
- In office October 1739 – May 1741 Serving with Samuel Cluckston, Thomas Benedict
- Preceded by: Joseph Platt, John Betts, Jr.
- Succeeded by: John Betts, Jr., John Belding, Jr.
- In office October 1742 – May 1743 Serving with Samuel Fitch
- Preceded by: John Betts, Jr.
- Succeeded by: Samuel Fitch, John Betts, Jr.
- In office May 1746 – October 1746 Serving with Samuel Fitch
- Preceded by: Joseph Platt, Samuel Fitch
- Succeeded by: Joseph Platt, Samuel Fitch
- In office October 1748 – May 1749 Serving with Joseph Platt, Jr.
- Preceded by: Samuel Fitch, Elnathan Hanford
- Succeeded by: Joseph Platt, Jr., Nehemiah Mead
- In office October 1749 – May 1750 Serving with Joseph Platt, Jr.
- Preceded by: Joseph Platt, Jr., Nehemiah Mead
- Succeeded by: Samuel Fitch, Joseph Platt, Jr.
- In office October 1751 – May 1752 Serving with David Lambert
- Preceded by: Joseph Platt, Jr., Samuel Fitch
- Succeeded by: Joseph Platt, Jr., Samuel Fitch

Personal details
- Born: April 21, 1683 Norwalk, Connecticut Colony
- Died: May 5, 1769 (aged 86)
- Resting place: Pine Island Cemetery, Norwalk, Connecticut
- Spouse: Lydia Smith (daughter of Samuel Smith) (m. October 23, 1707)
- Children: Lydia Lockwood (died in infancy), Hannah Lockwood Rogers, Reverend James Lockwood, Lydia Lockwood Keeler, Job Lockwood, John Lockwood, Reverend Samuel Lockwood

Military service
- Rank: Colonel
- Unit: North Company of the Norwalk Trainband

James Lockwood (April 21, 1683 – May 5, 1769) was a member of the Connecticut House of Representatives from Norwalk, Connecticut Colony. He was the youngest son of Ephraim Lockwood and Mercy St. John and the brother of Eliphalet Lockwood.

Lockwood served in the following sessions of the House:

- May 1721
- May 1722
- October 1723
- October 1724
- May 1726
- May 1727
- May 1729
- May and October 1732
- May 1733
- May and October 1735
- May 1738
- October 1739
- May and October 1740
- October 1742
- May 1746
- October 1748
- October 1749
- October 1751

He was appointed a justice of the peace by the General Assembly from 1744 to 1756.

Preceded by Joseph Platt; James Brown	Member of the Connecticut House of Representatives from Norwalk; May 1721 – October 1721; With: Joseph Platt	Succeeded by
Preceded by	Member of the Connecticut House of Representatives from Norwalk; May 1722 – October 1722; With: John Benedict	Succeeded by Joseph Platt; Samuel Hanford
Preceded by	Member of the Connecticut House of Representatives from Norwalk; October 1723 – May 1724; With: Samuel Comstock	Succeeded by Eliphalet Lockwood; Matthew Gregory
Preceded by Eliphalet Lockwood; Matthew Gregory	Member of the Connecticut House of Representatives from Norwalk; October 1724 – May 1725; With: Joseph Platt	Succeeded by John Benedict
Preceded by Joseph Platt; Samuel Comstock	Member of the Connecticut House of Representatives from Norwalk; May 1726 – October 1726; With: Thomas Fitch	Succeeded by Joseph Platt; Samuel Comstock
Preceded by Joseph Platt; Samuel Comstock	Member of the Connecticut House of Representatives from Norwalk; May 1727 – October 1727; With: Thomas Fitch	Succeeded by Joseph Platt; Samuel Comstock
Preceded by Joseph Platt; Samuel Comstock	Member of the Connecticut House of Representatives from Norwalk; May 1729 – October 1729; With: Thomas Fitch	Succeeded by Joseph Platt; Samuel Comstock
Preceded by Joseph Platt; John Betts, Jr.	Member of the Connecticut House of Representatives from Norwalk; May 1732 – October 1733; With: Joseph Platt	Succeeded by Joseph Platt; Samuel Hanford
Preceded by Joseph Platt; Daniel Hoyt	Member of the Connecticut House of Representatives from Norwalk; May 1735 – May 1736; With: Samuel Hanford	Succeeded by Samuel Hanford; Samuel Fitch
Preceded by Joseph Platt; Samuel Hanford	Member of the Connecticut House of Representatives from Norwalk; May 1738 – October 1738; With: John Marvin	Succeeded by Joseph Platt; Joseph Comstock
Preceded by Joseph Platt; John Betts, Jr.	Member of the Connecticut House of Representatives from Norwalk; October 1739 – May 1741; With: Samuel Cluckston; Thomas Benedict	Succeeded by John Betts, Jr. John Belding, Jr.
Preceded by John Betts, Jr.	Member of the Connecticut House of Representatives from Norwalk; October 1742 – May 1743; With: Samuel Fitch	Succeeded by John Betts, Jr. Samuel Fitch
Preceded by Joseph Platt; Samuel Fitch	Member of the Connecticut House of Representatives from Norwalk; May 1746 – October 1746; With: Samuel Fitch	Succeeded by Joseph Platt; Samuel Fitch
Preceded by Samuel Fitch; Elnathan Hanford	Member of the Connecticut House of Representatives from Norwalk; October 1748 – May 1749; With: Joseph Platt, Jr.	Succeeded by Joseph Platt, Jr. Nehemiah Mead
Preceded by Joseph Platt, Jr. Nehemiah Mead	Member of the Connecticut House of Representatives from Norwalk; October 1749 – May 1750; With: Joseph Platt, Jr.	Succeeded by Samuel Fitch; Joseph Platt, Jr.
Preceded by Joseph Platt, Jr. Samuel Fitch	Member of the Connecticut House of Representatives from Norwalk; October 1751 – May 1752; With: David Lambert	Succeeded by Joseph Platt, Jr. Samuel Fitch
