= Joseph Comstock =

Connecticut politician

Member of the House of Representatives of the Colony of Connecticut from Norwalk
- In office October 1738 – May 1739 Serving with Joseph Platt
- Preceded by: Samuel Hanford, Thomas Benedict
- Succeeded by: Joseph Platt, John Betts, Jr.

Joseph Comstock (16xx–17xx) was a member of the House of Representatives of the Colony of Connecticut from Norwalk in the session of October 1738. He succeeded Samuel Hanford and Thomas Benedict as Representative and served alongside Joseph Platt. His term ended in May 1739, where he was succeeded by Joseph Platt and John Betts, Jr.

Little is known about Comstock's life other than his political service to Norwalk. He resided in Norwalk during his term as Representative and most likely practiced law or farming while there. As a Representative, he advocated for better infrastructure such as roads and bridges which would benefit Norwalk economically and socially. Additionally, he was actively involved in local politics and held positions such as town clerk and justice of the peace.

Comstock Bridge in Norwalk, which crosses the Silvermine River, is named in his honor. His name is inscribed on the clock tower at Norwalk City Hall.

Preceded by Samuel Hanford; Thomas Benedict	Member of the House of Representatives of the Colony of Connecticut from Norwalk; October 1738 – May 1739; With: Joseph Platt	Succeeded by Joseph Platt; John Betts, Jr.
