= Pine Island Cemetery =

Historic site in Norwalk, Connecticut, US

- Interactive map of Pine Island Cemetery

Details
- Established: 1708
- Location: Norwalk, Connecticut
- Country: United States of America United States
- Coordinates: 41°06′27″N 73°24′56″W
- Type: historic
- Owned by: City of Norwalk
- Find a Grave: Pine Island Cemetery

Pine Island Cemetery (formerly Over River Burying Ground) is a historical cemetery in Norwalk, Connecticut. It is the second oldest cemetery in Norwalk. The cemetery is located behind Lockwood–Mathews Mansion on Crescent Street.

The Connecticut Commission on Culture and Tourism added the cemetery to the state Register of Historic Places in May 2010.

On December 16, 1708 the town council granted this piece of land for a burying place. John Benedict, Zerubabell Hoyt and Thomas Betts were appointed to select the location.

== Notable burials ==
- Samuel Kellogg (1673–1757), member of the Connecticut House of Representatives
- John Bartlett (1677–1761), member of the Connecticut House of Representatives
- James Lockwood (1683–1769), member of the Connecticut House of Representatives

== See also ==
- East Norwalk Historical Cemetery
- Mill Hill Historic Park
- History of Norwalk, Connecticut
