= Samuel Fitch =

American politician

Member of the House of Representatives of the Colony of Connecticut from Norwalk
- In office May 1736 – October 1736 Serving with Samuel Hanford
- Preceded by: James Lockwood, Samuel Hanford
- Succeeded by: Samuel Hanford, John Betts, Jr.
- In office October 1741 – October 1743 Serving with John Betts, Jr., James Lockwood
- Preceded by: John Betts, Jr., John Belding, Jr.
- In office May 1744 – October 1748 Serving with Thomas Benedict, Joseph Platt, James Lockwood, Elnathan Hanford
- Succeeded by: James Lockwood, Joseph Platt, Jr.
- In office May 1750 – October 1751 Serving with Joseph Platt, Jr.
- Preceded by: James Lockwood, Joseph Platt, Jr.
- Succeeded by: James Lockwood, David Lambert
- In office May 1752 – May 1753 Serving with Joseph Platt, Jr.
- Preceded by: James Lockwood, David Lambert
- Succeeded by: James Fitch, Noah Taylor
- In office October 1753 – October 1754 Serving with Joseph Platt, Jr., Theophilus Fitch
- Preceded by: James Fitch, Noah Taylor
- Succeeded by: Joseph Platt, Jr., James Fitch
- In office October 1760 – October 1761 Serving with Joseph Platt, Jr.
- Preceded by: Joseph Platt, Jr., Joseph Betts
- Succeeded by: Peter Lockwood, Thomas Fitch, V

Personal details
- Born: July 1701 Norwalk, Connecticut Colony
- Died: 1787 Norwalk, Connecticut
- Spouse(s): Susannah Belden Whiting (daughter of Daniel Belden, widow of William Whiting)
- Children: Susannah Fitch Church, Elizabeth Fitch Rogers (m. Nehemiah Rogers), Samuel Jr., Daniel Fitch, Anne Fitch St. John (m. Stephen St. John), Jonathan Fitch

Samuel Fitch (July 1701 – 1787) was a member of the House of Representatives of the Colony of Connecticut from Norwalk in the sessions of May 1736, October 1741, May and October 1742, May 1743, May and October 1744, May and October 1745, May and October 1746, May and October 1747, May 1748, May and October 1750, May 1751, May and October 1752, October 1753, May 1754, October 1760, May 1761.

He was the son of Thomas Fitch III (1675–1731), and brother of Governor Thomas Fitch.

He was a New England King's Commissioner, and a large land proprietor. He inherited the tract of land which adjoins the harbor to the east of Gregory Point.

On May 27, 1743, he was named auditor of the colonial treasury.

Preceded by James Lockwood; Samuel Hanford	Member of the House of Representatives of the Colony of Connecticut from Norwalk; May 1736 – October 1736; With: Samuel Hanford	Succeeded by Samuel Hanford; John Betts, Jr.
Preceded by John Betts, Jr. John Belding, Jr.	Member of the House of Representatives of the Colony of Connecticut from Norwalk; October 1741 – October 1743; With: John Betts, Jr. James Lockwood	Succeeded by
Preceded by	Member of the House of Representatives of the Colony of Connecticut from Norwalk; May 1744 – October 1748; With: Thomas Benedict; Joseph Platt; James Lockwood; Elnathan Hanford	Succeeded by James Lockwood; Joseph Platt, Jr.
Preceded by James Lockwood; Joseph Platt, Jr.	Member of the House of Representatives of the Colony of Connecticut from Norwalk; May 1750 – October 1751; With: Joseph Platt, Jr.	Succeeded by James Lockwood; David Lambert
Preceded by James Lockwood; David Lambert	Member of the House of Representatives of the Colony of Connecticut from Norwalk; May 1752 – May 1753; With: Joseph Platt, Jr.	Succeeded by James Fitch; Noah Taylor
Preceded by James Fitch; Noah Taylor	Member of the House of Representatives of the Colony of Connecticut from Norwalk; October 1753 – October 1754; With: Joseph Platt, Jr. Theophilus Fitch	Succeeded by Joseph Platt, Jr. James Fitch
Preceded by Joseph Platt, Jr. Joseph Betts	Member of the House of Representatives of the Colony of Connecticut from Norwalk; October 1760 – October 1761; With: Joseph Platt, Jr.	Succeeded by Peter Lockwood; Thomas Fitch, V
