= Matthew Gregory (deacon) =

American politician (1680–1777)

Member of the Connecticut House of Representatives from Norwalk
- In office May 1724 – October 1724 Serving with Eliphalet Lockwood
- Preceded by: Samuel Comstock, James Lockwood
- Succeeded by: James Lockwood, Joseph Platt

Personal details
- Born: December 17, 1680 Norwalk, Connecticut Colony
- Died: May 1777 Wilton parish, Norwalk, Connecticut
- Resting place: Sharp's Hill Cemetery, Wilton, Connecticut
- Spouse(s): Hannah Keeler Gregory (daughter of John Keeler, m. ca. 1709, Wilton)
- Children: Hannah Gregory Marvin, Ezra Gregory, Jemima Gregory, Sarah Gregory, Daniel Gregory, Matthew Gregory
- Occupation: deacon

Military service
- Rank: Lieutenant

Matthew Gregory (December 17, 1680 – May 1777) was a member of the Connecticut House of Representatives from Norwalk, Connecticut Colony in the session of May 1724.

He was the son of Jachin Gregory.

He settled on Belden Hill in Wilton by 1737.

Preceded by Samuel Comstock; James Lockwood	Member of the Connecticut House of Representatives from Norwalk; May 1724–October 1724; With: Eliphalet Lockwood	Succeeded by Joseph Platt; James Lockwood
