= Eliphalet Lockwood (deacon) =

American politician (1675–1753)

Member of the Connecticut House of Representatives from Norwalk
- In office May 1724 – October 1724 Serving with Matthew Gregory
- Preceded by: Samuel Comstock, James Lockwood
- Succeeded by: James Lockwood, Joseph Platt

Personal details
- Born: February 27, 1675 Norwalk, Connecticut Colony
- Died: October 14, 1753 (aged 78)
- Resting place: Mill Hill Burying Ground, Norwalk, Connecticut
- Spouse: Mary Gold (m. October 11, 1699)
- Children: Hannah Lockwood (1700–1712), Damaris Lockwood Betts (m. John Betts, Jr.), Mary Lockwood Kellogg, Unknown son died in infancy, Eliphalet Lockwood, John Lockwood (1707–1734), Mercy Lockwood (1709–1712), Peter Lockwood, Hannah Lockwood (1712–1713), Abigail Lockwood
- Occupation: deacon

Eliphalet Lockwood (February 27, 1675 – October 14, 1753) was a member of the Connecticut House of Representatives from Norwalk, Connecticut Colony in the session of May 1724.

He was the son of Ephraim Lockwood and Mercy St. John Lockwood and the brother of James Lockwood.

Preceded by Samuel Comstock; James Lockwood	Member of the Connecticut House of Representatives from Norwalk; May 1724–October 1724; With: Matthew Gregory	Succeeded by Joseph Platt; James Lockwood
