= Samuel Cluckston =

American politician

Member of the House of Representatives of the Colony of Connecticut from Norwalk
- In office October 1739 – October 1740 Serving with James Lockwood
- Preceded by: Joseph Platt, John Betts, Jr.
- Succeeded by: James Lockwood, Thomas Benedict

Personal details
- Born: November 17, 1696 Fairfield, Connecticut Colony
- Died: 1751 Norwalk, Connecticut Colony
- Spouse: Deborah Ketchum
- Children: Mary Cluckstone Perry
- Occupation: Hat manufacturer

Military service
- Rank: Captain

Samuel Cluckston (also Samuel Cluxton, Samuel Cluckstone and Samuel Klugston; November 17, 1696 – 1751) was a member of the House of Representatives of the Colony of Connecticut from Norwalk in the sessions of October 1739 and May 1740. He was Norwalk town treasurer for several years.

He was the son of Michael Cluckston, and Mary Wakeman of Fairfield.

He established a hat manufacturing business in Norwalk as early as 1709. He was the first known hat maker in Norwalk, which would become Norwalk's largest industry by 1845.

One of the founding members of St. Paul's on the Green.

Preceded by Joseph Platt; John Betts, Jr.	Member of the House of Representatives of the Colony of Connecticut from Norwalk; October 1739 – October 1740; With: James Lockwood	Succeeded by James Lockwood; Thomas Benedict
