= Joseph Birchard =

American politician (1673–1755)

Member of the Connecticut House of Representatives from Norwalk
- In office May 1730 – October 1730 Serving with Thomas Fitch
- Preceded by: Joseph Platt, Samuel Comstock
- Succeeded by: Joseph Platt, Samuel Comstock
- In office May 1734 – October 1734 Serving with John Marvin
- Preceded by: Joseph Platt, Samuel Hanford
- Succeeded by: Joseph Platt, Daniel Hoyt

Personal details
- Born: February 1673 Norwich, Connecticut Colony
- Died: March 9, 1755 Wilton parish, Norwalk, Connecticut Colony
- Spouse: Elizabeth Lambert (m. June 29, 1710, First Congregational Church in Wilton)
- Children: Grace Birchard Eglestone, Joseph Birchard, Elizabeth Birchard Keeler, John Birchard, Jesse Birchard, James Birchard, Daniel Birchard, Abigail Birchard Betts, Isaiah Birchard, Zebulon Birchard, Deborah Birchard Doolittle

Joseph Birchard (February 1673 – March 9, 1755) was a member of the Connecticut House of Representatives from Norwalk, Connecticut Colony in the sessions of May 1730 and May 1734.

He was the son of John Birchard, a founding settler and town clerk of Norwich and Christian Andrews.

On December 15, 1709, he, along with Thomas Betts, John Betts, and John Gregory, Jr., was authorized by a town meeting to dam a creek for the purposes of building a grist mill.

Preceded by Joseph Platt; Samuel Comstock	Member of the Connecticut House of Representatives from Norwalk; May 1730 – October 1730; With: Thomas Fitch	Succeeded by Joseph Platt; Samuel Comstock
Preceded by Joseph Platt; Samuel Hanford	Member of the Connecticut House of Representatives from Norwalk; May 1734 – October 1734; With: John Marvin	Succeeded by Joseph Platt; Daniel Hoyt
