= John Copp =

American politician (1673–1751)

Member of the House of Representatives of the Colony of Connecticut from Norwalk
- In office May 1706 – October 1706 Serving with Samuel Keeler
- Preceded by: Thomas Betts, Samuel Hanford
- Succeeded by: Joseph Platt
- In office May 1716 – October 1716 Serving with John Betts
- Succeeded by: Joseph Platt, John Raymond, Jr.
- In office October 1718 – October 1719 Serving with Joseph Platt
- Preceded by: John Bartlett, Samuel Marvin
- Succeeded by: Samuel Hanford, Joseph Platt

Town Clerk of the Town of Norwalk
- In office 1708–1740
- Preceded by: Samuel Hanford
- Succeeded by: Elnathan Hanford

Personal details
- Born: June 9, 1673 Boston, Massachusetts Bay Colony
- Died: May 16, 1751 (aged 77) Norwalk, Connecticut Colony
- Resting place: East Norwalk Historical Cemetery, Norwalk, Connecticut
- Spouse(s): Mary Jagger Phelps (m. March 16, 1698), Ruth Hayes Belden (daughter of Samuel Hayes, widow of John Belding, m. December 30, 1701)
- Occupation: Teacher, deacon, surveyor, doctor

Military service
- Battles/wars: Queen Anne's War

John Copp (June 9, 1673 – May 16, 1751) was a member of the House of Representatives of the Colony of Connecticut from Norwalk in the sessions of May 1706, May 1716, October 1718, and May 1719. He served from 1708 to 1740 as the town clerk of Norwalk. He was one of the purchasers of the land for the present town of Ridgefield, Connecticut from the Ramapoo Indians, as well as the town's clerk and surveyor. He also laid out the lots and roads of the present town of Bedford, New York.

== Early life and family ==
He was born in Boston, Massachusetts Bay Colony, on June 9, 1673, the son of David Copp, and Obedience Topliff. His father was a cordwainer, a clerk of the market, and a sealer of leather. He was also a surveyor and adviser to selectmen of Boston on matters dealing with the laying of bounds for highways and property listings.

John Copp moved to Stamford, Connecticut Colony, while still in his twenties. There he married the widow Mary Jagger Phelps on March 16, 1698, but soon thereafter she died. He worked in Stamford for some time as a schoolteacher.

== Settlement at Bedford ==
In 1699, he temporarily moved to Bedford (which was, at the time a part of the Connecticut Colony, but would later be a part of New York.) On November 14, 1699, he was granted 23 acres with the condition that he settle on the land for three years. Copp was appointed to a committee to negotiate with the Natives to purchase more land. By February 1700, he was appointed town treasurer and chief surveyor. As town surveyor, he laid out the lots and roads of the town.

== Life in Norwalk ==
In 1701, a town meeting in Norwalk, Copp was hired as a schoolteacher.

In 1705, the selectmen of Norwalk recommended that Copp apply for a medical license. He was subsequently granted a license. On July 24, 1711, at a meeting in New Haven, the Governor's Council of Assistants voted to dispatch Copp as a surgeon with a Connecticut regiment which was assigned to attack the French in Port Royal. Whether or not Copp actually had any medical training is not known.

== Purchase of Ridgefield ==
On May 9, 1706, the Connecticut General Assembly appointed Captain Jonathan Selleck, David Waterbury and John Copp to visit the area north of Norwalk, and south of Danbury for the purpose of inspecting the land for a settlement. However, complications arise and no action was taken. On May 3, 1708, John Copp and John Raymond, Jr. visited the area. They may have camped at Settlers Rock at the south edge of today’s Ridgefield Cemetery on North Salem Road. They reported that the land was good and would sustain 30 families or more. As a result, about 20,000 acres of land were purchased from Catoonah on behalf of the Ramapoo Indians. In 1710, the original proprietors of Ridgefield chose John Copp, Josiah Starr and Major Peter Burr to survey their land.

Copp was Ridgefield’s first doctor, first schoolmaster and first Town Clerk. He recorded all the land sales, took the minutes at town meetings and listed all marriages, births, and deaths in the town records. When the Reverend Hauley arrived in 1712, Copp returned to Norwalk.

Copp's Island (41.0589°N 73.387°W), Copp’s Hill Road, Copp’s Hill Shopping Plaza and Copp’s Mountain are all named in his honor.

Preceded by Thomas Betts; Samuel Hanford	Member of the House of Representatives of the Colony of Connecticut from Norwalk; May 1706 – October 1706; With: Samuel Keeler	Succeeded by Joseph Platt
Preceded by	Member of the House of Representatives of the Colony of Connecticut from Norwalk; May 1716 – October 1716; With: John Betts	Succeeded by Joseph Platt; John Raymond, Jr.
Preceded by John Bartlett; Samuel Marvin	Member of the House of Representatives of the Colony of Connecticut from Norwalk; October 1718 – October 1719; With: Joseph Platt	Succeeded by Samuel Hanford; Joseph Platt
Preceded by Samuel Hanford	Town Clerk of the Town of Norwalk; 1708–1740	Succeeded by Elnathan Hanford
