= William B. Reed (politician) =

American mayor

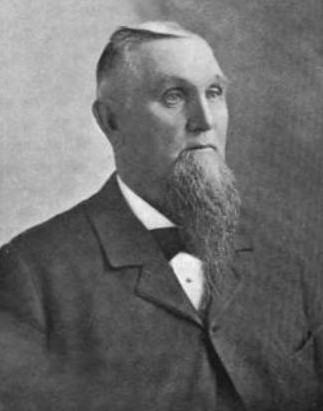

16th Mayor of South Norwalk, Connecticut
- In office 1891–1893
- Preceded by: Edwin Wilcox
- Succeeded by: George Lockwood

Personal details
- Born: February 27, 1833 South Norwalk, Connecticut
- Died: October 16, 1909 (aged 76)
- Party: Democratic
- Spouse: Catherine E. Post (m. February 9, 1859)
- Children: Irene, Ansley, Benjamin, Catherine, and William H.
- Occupation: Oyster planter and shipper

William Benjamin Reed (27 February 1833 – 16 October 1909) was a one term Democratic mayor of South Norwalk, Connecticut from 1891 to 1892. He served on the South Norwalk City Council from 1878 to 1879.

He was the son of Benjamin Pearce Reed of New York City and Eliza Weed of New Canaan. He was the third great-grandson of John Read, who settled in Norwalk in 1687. Reed attended the common schools, and at 18, he became an oysterman. It became his life's work. He was a partner in Reed and Housmen, oyster growers and shippers.

== Associations ==
- Member, Masons
- Member, Norwalk Yacht Club

Preceded by Edwin Wilcox	Mayor of South Norwalk, Connecticut; 1891–1893	Succeeded by George Lockwood
