= Daniel Hoyt =

American politician (1681–1764)

Member of the House of Representatives of the Colony of Connecticut from Norwalk
- In office October 1734 – May 1735 Serving with Joseph Platt
- Preceded by: Joseph Birchard, John Marvin
- Succeeded by: Samuel Hanford, James Lockwood

Personal details
- Born: January 1, 1681 Norwalk, Connecticut Colony
- Died: August 13, 1764 Norwalk, Connecticut Colony
- Resting place: Crissy-Seeley Cemetery, New Canaan, Connecticut
- Spouse(s): Elizabeth Keeler (daughter of John Keeler), Sarah Benedict Starr (daughter of Thomas Benedict, Jr., widow of John Starr of Danbury)
- Children: Abel Hoyt, Ezra Hoyt, Abigail Hoyt Smith, Daniel Hoyt, Jr., Abner Hoyt, John Hoyt, Nathan Hoyt, Mary Hoyt Benedict, Abram Hoyt
- Occupation: deacon

Daniel Hoyt (also Daniel Hoit) (January 1, 1681 – August 13, 1764) was a member of the House of Representatives of the Colony of Connecticut from Norwalk in the session of October 1734.

He was the son of Zerrubabel Hoyt and Hannah Knapp. He was the grandson of Walter Hoyt, the Norwalk settler.

Preceded by Joseph Birchard; John Marvin	Member of the House of Representatives of the Colony of Connecticut from Norwalk; October 1734 – May 1735; With: Joseph Platt	Succeeded by Samuel Hanford; James Lockwood
