= John Reed (Connecticut politician) =

American politician

Member of the Connecticut House of Representatives from Norwalk
- In office May 1715 – October 1715 Serving with John Betts
- Preceded by: Joseph Platt, Samuel Comstock
- In office October 1717 – May 1718 Serving with Samuel Hanford
- Succeeded by: John Bartlett, Samuel Marvin

Personal details
- Born: 1633 Wendron, Cornwall, England
- Died: 1730 (aged 96 - 97) Stamford, Connecticut Colony
- Resting place: Reed's Farm, Rowayton, Connecticut
- Spouse(s): Anne Samson Derby (widow of Francis Derby) (m. 1652, Providence, Rhode Island), widow Scofield of Stamford
- Children: John Reed, Jr., Thomas Reed, William John Reed, Mary Reed Tuttle, Abigail Reed
- Occupation: Lawyer

Military service
- Allegiance: Roundhead
- Rank: Colonel
- Unit: Army of the Protector
- Battles/wars: English Civil War, Corfe Castle (1649)

John Reed (1633 – 1730) was a member of the Connecticut House of Representatives from Norwalk, Connecticut Colony in the May 1715 and October 1717 sessions.

He was the son of James Reed.

He was an officer in Oliver Cromwell's army, and a soldier from the age of sixteen. When Charles II of England was restored to the throne, Reed left for America. He settled first in Providence, Colony of Rhode Island and Providence Plantations. In Providence, he married Anne Samson Derby. He later moved to Rye, Province of New York, in 1684, where he lived for three or four years. He then established himself in the western part of Norwalk, at a house he built on the eastern side of the Five Mile River, north of the Old Post Road and nearly two miles from the Long Island Sound at a place called Reed's Farms. His name is found among the records of the town of Norwalk in 1687. John Reed was admitted to the bar in 1708 in Norwalk, Connecticut. His house was used for a meeting place for some years. His wife died and he married again to the Widow Scofield from Stamford.

He died in Norwalk, in the ninety-eighth year of his age, in 1730, and was interred in a tomb on his own farm.

== Notable descendants ==
- Third great-grandfather of William Benjamin Reed (1833–1909), mayor of South Norwalk, Connecticut from 1891 to 1892.

Preceded by Joseph Platt; Samuel Comstock	Member of the Connecticut House of Representatives from Norwalk; May 1715–October 1715; With: John Betts	Succeeded by
Preceded by	Member of the Connecticut House of Representatives from Norwalk; October 1717–May 1718; With: Samuel Hanford	Succeeded by John Bartlett; Samuel Marvin
