= Connecticut's 142nd House of Representatives district =

American legislative district

Connecticut's 142nd State House of Representatives district
Representative
Lucy Dathan; D–New Canaan

Connecticut's 142nd House of Representatives district elects one member of the Connecticut House of Representatives. It is represented by Lucy Dathan. The district consists of parts of Norwalk and New Canaan.

== List of representatives ==
List of representatives from Connecticut's 142nd State House district
Representative	Party	Years	District home	Note
Edward W. Mansfield	Democratic	1967–1969	Fairfield	Seat created
Joseph T. Gormley	Republican	1969–1973	Fairfield	
John F. Mannix	Republican	1973–1983	Wilton	
Marilyn Roche	Republican	1983–1987	Wilton	
Margaret Gill	Republican	1987–1993	Wilton	
Lawrence F. Cafero	Republican	1993–2015	Norwalk	
Friedrich Wilms	Republican	2015–2019	Norwalk	
Lucy Dathan	Democratic	2019–	New Canaan	

== Recent Election Results ==
=== 2022 ===
2022 Connecticut State House of Representatives election, 142nd District
Party	Candidate	Votes	%
Democratic	Lucy Dathan (incumbent)	5,202	57.90
Republican	Donald Mastronardi	3,453	38.43
Independent Party	Donald Mastronardi	162	1.80
Working Families	Lucy Dathan	167	1.86
Total votes		8,979	100.0

=== 2020 ===
2020 Connecticut State House of Representatives election, District 142
Party	Candidate	Votes	%
Democratic	Lucy Dathan (incumbent)	7,647	53.60
Republican	Fred Wilms	5,974	41.87
Independent Party	Fred Wilms	378	2.65
Working Families	Lucy Dathan (incumbent)	269	1.89
Total votes		14,268	100.00
Democratic hold			

== See also ==
- List of members of the Connecticut General Assembly from Norwalk
