= Central Avenue-Center Cemetery Historic District =

Historic district in Connecticut, United States

- U.S. National Register of Historic Places
- U.S. Historic district
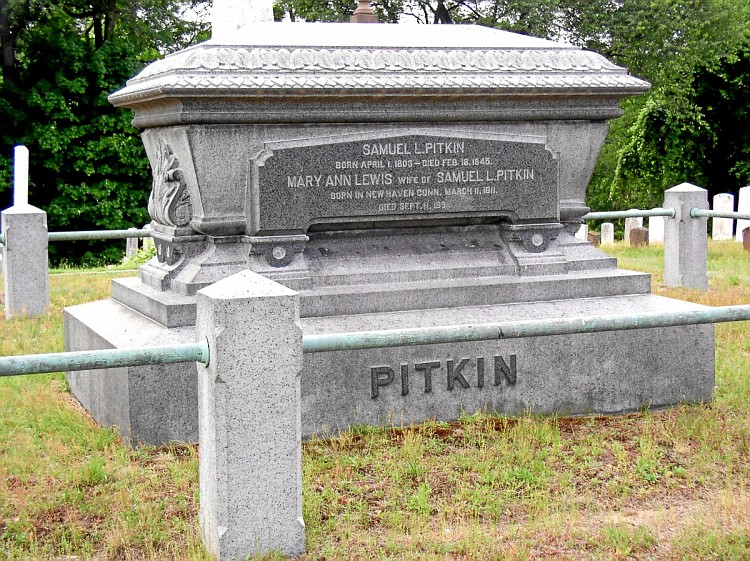
- Pitkin Grave marker in East Hartford's Center Cemetery

- Location within Connecticut Location within the United States
- Location: Center Avenue from Main Street to Elm Street and Center Cemetery to the North, East Hartford, Connecticut
- Coordinates: 41°46′9″N 72°38′29″W
- Area: 45 acres (18 ha)
- Architect: Brocklesby, William C.
- Architectural style: Italianate, Queen Anne
- MPS: East Hartford MPS
- NRHP reference No.: 93000289
- Added to NRHP: April 19, 1993

The Central Avenue-Center Cemetery Historic District encompasses part of the town center of East Hartford, Connecticut. Although it was founded in the mid-17th century, it is now dominated by architecture of the late 19th and early 20th centuries. The Center Cemetery is the town's oldest surviving property, and includes the grave of William Pitkin, a colonial governor. The district, including portions of Main Street and Central Avenue, was listed on the National Register of Historic Places in 1993.

== Description and history ==
The town of East Hartford was settled not long after the first settlement by English colonists across the Connecticut River at Hartford in 1636. Its Main Street is set on high terrace above that river and the Hockanum River to the south, now well-protected from historic flooding by a system of dikes built between 1938 and 1944. Originally part of Hartford, it was separately incorporated in 1783. The earliest parcels of the Center Cemetery, acquired in 1710, are the oldest surviving element of the early settlement period. The area prospered in the 18th century with agriculture and industry, the latter powered by the waters of the Hockanum River. Improved transportation systems of the late 19th century gradually transformed the center from a more agriculturally focused area to a residential suburb of Hartford, readily accessible via the Bulkeley Bridge and streetcar service. A significant area of Main Street was redeveloped after World War II, but a small portion near Central Avenue, and the residences lining that street and the adjacent cemetery, represent well the historic development of the town.

The historic district includes four buildings on Main Street: the c. 1874 Albert Raymond House, the East Hartford Public Library, the 1939 Post Office building, and the c. 1919 Church's Corner Inn. The library is set in a park that was a gift of Albert Raymond, which includes a number of the town's war memorials. The library, built in 1889, is a fine example of Romanesque architecture. Extend east from the library is Central Avenue, which is lined mainly by 19th-century and early 20th-century houses. They are typically two stories in height and of wood-frame construction. The most common styles found are the Italianate and Queen Anne, with many vernacular structures from the 1880s and 1890s. There are a few brick houses, as well as a few brick apartment houses near the eastern end of the street.

== See also ==
- National Register of Historic Places listings in Hartford County, Connecticut
