= Samuel Kellogg =

American politician

Member of the Connecticut House of Representatives from Norwalk
- In office May 1714 – October 1714 Serving with Samuel Hanford
- Preceded by: Joseph Platt, Matthew Seymour
- Succeeded by: Samuel Comstock, Joseph Platt

Personal details
- Born: February 19, 1673 Norwalk, Connecticut Colony
- Died: October 13, 1757 (aged 84) Wilton, Connecticut Colony
- Resting place: Pine Island Cemetery, Norwalk, Connecticut
- Spouse(s): Sarah Platt (daughter of John Platt, m. September 6, 1704), Sarah Lockwood (widow of Deacon Benjamin Hickox, m. March 9, 1756)
- Children: Sarah Kellogg, Samuel Kellogg, Jr., Mary Kellogg, Martin Kellogg, Abigail Kellogg, Lidiah Kellogg, Gideon Kellogg, Epenetus Kellogg

Samuel Kellogg (February 19, 1673 – October 13, 1757) was a member of the Connecticut House of Representatives from Norwalk in the May 1714 session.

He was the son of Daniel Kellogg, the Norwalk settler and Bridget Bouton.

Samuel owned land in what is now New Canaan, including property on Marvin's Ridge, and Clapboard Hill.

In 1703, he was the collector of Norwalk. In 1705 and 1714, he was a selectman. On June 3, 1723, he was appointed to a committee to seat the new meeting house.

He was eighty-two years old when he married Sarah Lockwood, and she was seventy-seven. The wedding was a notable event.

Preceded by Joseph Platt; Matthew Seymour	Member of the Connecticut House of Representatives from Norwalk; May 1714–October 1714; With: Samuel Hanford	Succeeded by Samuel Comstock; Joseph Platt
