= Marilyn Roche =

American politician (died 2003)

Member of the Connecticut House of Representatives from the 142nd district
- In office 1983–1987
- Preceded by: John F. Mannix
- Succeeded by: Margaret Gill

Personal details
- Born: Marilyn Miller; 1938 or 1939 Rochester, New York, U.S.
- Died: April 6, 2003 (aged 64) Burlingame, California, U.S.
- Party: Republican
- Spouse: D'Arcy Roche
- Children: 5
- Education: Cornell University; Stanford University (MA)

Marilyn Roche (1938 or 1939 – April 6, 2003) was an American politician who served in the Connecticut House of Representatives from 1983 to 1987, representing the 142nd district as a Republican.

== Personal life and education ==
Roche was born Marilyn Miller in Rochester, New York. She attended Cornell University and earned a master's degree in child psychology from Stanford University.

Roche met her husband, D'Arcy Roche, while living in New York City, and they moved to Wilton, Connecticut, in 1973. They lived in Wilton until 1987, when they moved to the San Francisco Bay Area. They had five sons together.

Roche died of colon cancer on April 6, 2003, in Burlingame, California.

== Career ==
Roche first entered Connecticut politics while living in Wilton. She was president of the local League of Women Voters, served two terms as chairman on Wilton's Board of Education, and was chairman of Wilton's Board of Tax Review.

Roche was elected to the Connecticut House of Representatives in 1982, and she served two terms representing the 142nd district as a Republican. While serving in the House of Representatives, Roche focused much of her work on education, sponsoring bills to raise teachers' pay and abolish the requirement of an undergraduate education degree. Roche did not run for reelection in 1986 and was succeeded by Margaret Gill.

Roche moved to the Bay Area in 1987. There, she would continue working in the field of education, becoming a board member of the San Francisco chapter of Jumpstart, a national early education organization that trains educators to work with preschoolers in underserved neighborhoods.
