= Margaret Gill (politician) =

American politician (died 1994)

Member of the Connecticut House of Representatives from the 142nd district
- In office 1987–1993
- Preceded by: Marilyn Roche
- Succeeded by: Lawrence F. Cafero

Personal details
- Born: Margaret Louise Snowden; 1940 or 1941
- Died: July 16, 1994 (aged 53) Norwalk, Connecticut, U.S.
- Party: Republican
- Spouse: William R. Gill Jr.
- Children: 3
- Education: Wellesley College

Margaret Louise Snowden Gill (1940 or 1941 – July 16, 1994) was an American politician who served in the Connecticut House of Representatives from 1987 to 1993, representing the 142nd district as a Republican.

== Personal life ==
Margaret Louise Snowden was born in 1940 or 1941. She graduated from Miss Hutchinson's School in Memphis, Tennessee, and Wellesley College in Wellesley, Massachusetts. She was married to William Ronald Gill Jr. and had three children. In the 1960s, she worked for Town & Country.

== Political career ==
Gill was first elected to the Connecticut House of Representatives in 1986, and she served three terms representing the 142nd district as a Republican. She lived in Wilton during her tenure.

== Death ==
Gill died of cancer on July 16, 1994, at Norwalk Hospital in Norwalk, Connecticut. She was 53.
