= Samuel Marvin =

American politician (1664–1754)

Member of the Connecticut House of Representatives from Norwalk
- In office May 1718 – October 1718 Serving with John Bartlett
- Preceded by: Samuel Hanford, John Read
- Succeeded by: Joseph Platt, John Copp

Personal details
- Born: 1664 Norwalk, Connecticut Colony
- Died: 1754 Norwalk, Connecticut Colony
- Spouse: Hannah Platt (daughter of John Platt m. ca. 1701)
- Children: Matthew Marvin, Samuel Marvin, Abigail Marvin DeForest, Josiah Marvin, Isaac Marvin, Lewis Marvin, Joseph Marvin

Military service
- Rank: Lieutenant (October 19, 1719)
- Unit: South Company of the Norwalk Trainband

Samuel Marvin (1664–1754) was a member of the Connecticut House of Representatives from Norwalk, Connecticut Colony in the May 1718 session. He served as a townsman in 1702, 1707, 1710, 1712, 1714, 1717, 1724, and 1727.

He was the son of Matthew Marvin, Jr., one of the founding settlers of Norwalk and Mary Brush Marvin.

On June 3, 1723 he was appointed by a town meeting to a committee to seat the new meeting-house, of which his brother-in-law, Joseph Platt, was chairman.

From February 1732, until his death, he lived in Wilton parish, which, at the time was part of Norwalk. His house in Norwalk was still standing in 1902.

Preceded by Samuel Hanford; John Read	Member of the Connecticut House of Representatives from Norwalk; May 1718–October 1718; With: John Bartlett	Succeeded by Joseph Platt; John Copp
