= John Bartlett (Connecticut politician) =

American politician

Member of the Connecticut House of Representatives from Norwalk
- In office May 1718 – October 1718 Serving with Samuel Marvin
- Preceded by: Samuel Hanford, John Read
- Succeeded by: Joseph Platt, John Copp

Personal details
- Born: October 5, 1677 Norwalk, Connecticut Colony
- Died: August 5, 1761 (aged 83) Norwalk, Connecticut Colony
- Resting place: Pine Island Cemetery, Norwalk, Connecticut
- Spouse(s): Elizabeth Haynes (d. 1723), Mary Betts (daughter of Thomas Betts)
- Children: Elizabeth Bartlett Smith, Hannah Bartlett Hanford, William Bartlett, Isabel Bartlett Smith, Mary Bartlett Fitch, Sarah Bartlett Satterly Seeley, John Bartlett, Samuel Bartlett; Ann Bartlett, Rebecca Bartlett Belden
- Occupation: lawyer

John Bartlett (also John Bartlet) (October 5, 1677 – August 5, 1761) was a member of the Connecticut House of Representatives from Norwalk, Connecticut Colony in the May 1718 session.

He was the son of Benjamin Bartlett and Deborah Barnard, or alternatively, Richard Bartlett (1648-1724) and Hannah Emery (1654-1705).

He owned land on Bartlett Ridge, a height west of the west branch of the Norwalk River.

Preceded by Samuel Hanford; John Read	Member of the Connecticut House of Representatives from Norwalk; May 1718–October 1718; With: Samuel Marvin	Succeeded by Joseph Platt; John Copp
