= George Lockwood (politician) =

American mayor

17th Mayor of South Norwalk, Connecticut
- In office 1893–1893
- Preceded by: William B. Reed
- Succeeded by: Mortimer M. Lee

Personal details
- Born: April 3, 1862
- Spouse(s): Ella Squire (m. May 17, 1881), Annie Conley (m. November 23, 1893)

George Lockwood (April 3, 1862–) was a one term mayor of South Norwalk, Connecticut in 1893. Lockwood was the youngest son of William R. Lockwood and Mary Elisabeth Roberts.

In 1881, Lockwood was married to Ella Squire, the oldest daughter of Charles E. Squire (b. 1835) and Amanda Crofut. In October 1893, Lockwood's wife filed and on November 11, was granted a divorce because Lockwood had "called on the unmarried daughter of one of the city officials." When it came to be known publicly, his resignation was demanded from at least one Sunday pulpit. He submitted his resignation on Monday, November 20, 1893. He married Annie Conley, the daughter of a former policeman, Francis S. Conley on November 23, 1893.

Preceded by William B. Reed	Mayor of South Norwalk, Connecticut; 1893	Succeeded by Mortimer M. Lee
