= Edwin Wilcox =

American Mayor (born 1841)

15th Mayor of South Norwalk, Connecticut
- In office 1890–1890
- Preceded by: Frank Comstock
- Succeeded by: William B. Reed

Personal details
- Born: c. 1841
- Spouse: Mary E.
- Children: Lois, Hamilton, Leila

Edwin Wilcox (born c. 1841) was an American politician. He was a one term Democratic mayor of South Norwalk, Connecticut in 1890. He had previously served as clerk to the South Norwalk Common Council from 1872 to 1873, 1876, and from 1877 to 1887. He was partner in the grocery store Brown and Wilcox at 49 Washington Street. He also served as treasurer of the South Norwalk water fund.

When the South Norwalk Library became a city department, he appointed its first board of directors.

Preceded by Frank Comstock	Mayor of South Norwalk, Connecticut; 1945–1947	Succeeded by William B. Reed
