= James Brown (Connecticut politician) =

American politician

Member of the Connecticut House of Representatives from Norwalk
- In office October 1720 – May 1721 Serving with Joseph Platt
- Preceded by: Samuel Hanford, Samuel Comstock
- Succeeded by: Joseph Platt, James Lockwood
- In office May 1756 – October 1756
- Preceded by: Joseph Platt, Jr., Peter Lockwood
- In office May 1757 – October 1757
- Succeeded by: Joseph Platt, Jr., James Fitch

Personal details
- Born: November 1682 Norwalk, Connecticut Colony
- Died: 1769
- Spouse: Joanna Whitehead (m. December 20, 1714, Norwalk)
- Children: First son died in infancy, Rebeckah Brown, Joannah Brown, James Brown, Mary Brown Isaacs, Elizabeth Brown Hall, Samuel Brown, Ann Brown
- Occupation: Lawyer

James Brown (November 1682 – 1769) was a member of the Connecticut House of Representatives from Norwalk, Connecticut Colony in the sessions of October 1720, May 1756 and May 1757.

He was the son of James Browne and Rebecca Ruscoe.

In 1708, he was one of the purchasers of Ridgefield, Connecticut. He was also a purchaser of a large tract of land in Salem on which his son James Brown, Jr settled.

He was a partner of William Smith, Chief Justice of the Province of New York.

Preceded by Samuel Hanford; Samuel Comstock	Member of the Connecticut House of Representatives from Norwalk; October 1720 – May 1721; With: Joseph Platt	Succeeded by Joseph Platt; James Lockwood
Preceded by Joseph Platt, Jr. Peter Lockwood	Member of the Connecticut House of Representatives from Norwalk; May 1756 – October 1756	Succeeded by
Preceded by	Member of the Connecticut House of Representatives from Norwalk; May 1757 – October 1757	Succeeded by Joseph Platt, Jr. James Fitch
