= John Betts Jr. =

American politician

Member of the House of Representatives of the Colony of Connecticut from Norwalk
- In office October 1731 – May 1732 Serving with Joseph Platt
- Preceded by: Joseph Platt
- In office October 1736 – May 1737 Serving with Samuel Hanford
- Preceded by: Samuel Hanford, Samuel Fitch
- Succeeded by: Samuel Hanford, Thomas Benedict
- In office May 1739 – October 1739 Serving with Joseph Platt
- Preceded by: Joseph Platt, Joseph Comstock
- Succeeded by: James Lockwood, Samuel Cluckston
- In office May 1741 – October 1742 Serving with John Belding Jr., Samuel Fitch
- Preceded by: James Lockwood, Thomas Benedict
- Succeeded by: James Lockwood, Samuel Fitch
- In office May 1743 – October 1743 Serving with Samuel Fitch
- Preceded by: James Lockwood, Samuel Fitch

Personal details
- Born: November 17, 1692 Norwalk, Connecticut Colony
- Died: June 27, 1767 (aged 74) Norwalk, Connecticut Colony
- Resting place: Mill Hill Burying Ground, Norwalk, Connecticut
- Spouse: Damaris Lockwood (daughter of daughter of Eliphalet Lockwood) (m. April 17, 1722)
- Children: Thaddeus Betts, Mary Betts, Hannah Betts, John Betts, Peter Betts

John Betts Jr. (November 17, 1692 – June 27, 1767) was a member of the House of Representatives of the Colony of Connecticut from Norwalk in the sessions of October 1731, October 1736, May 1739, May and October 1741, May 1742, and May 1743

He was the son of John Betts.

He was appointed to be an auditor of the accounts of the treasurer of the Colony of Connecticut on May 10, 1739.

He was a justice of the peace from 1746 to 1748.

Preceded by Joseph Platt	Member of the House of Representatives of the Colony of Connecticut from Norwalk; October 1731 – May 1732; With: Joseph Platt	Succeeded by
Preceded by Samuel Hanford; Samuel Fitch	Member of the House of Representatives of the Colony of Connecticut from Norwalk; October 1736 – May 1737; With: Samuel Hanford	Succeeded by Thomas Benedict; Samuel Hanford
Preceded by Joseph Platt; Joseph Comstock	Member of the House of Representatives of the Colony of Connecticut from Norwalk; May 1739 – October 1739; With: Joseph Platt	Succeeded by James Lockwood; Samuel Cluckston
Preceded by James Lockwood; Thomas Benedict	Member of the House of Representatives of the Colony of Connecticut from Norwalk; May 1741 – October 1742; With: John Belding Jr. Samuel Fitch	Succeeded by James Lockwood; Samuel Fitch
Preceded by James Lockwood; Samuel Fitch	Member of the House of Representatives of the Colony of Connecticut from Norwalk; May 1743 – October 1743; With: Samuel Fitch	Succeeded by
