= Matthew Seymour =

American politician

Member of the Connecticut House of Representatives from Norwalk
- In office October 1712 – May 1713 Serving with Joseph Platt
- In office October 1713 – May 1714 Serving with Joseph Platt
- Succeeded by: Samuel Hanford, Samuel Kellogg

Personal details
- Born: May 1669 Norwalk, Connecticut Colony
- Died: 1735 Norwalk, Connecticut Colony
- Spouse(s): Sarah Hayes (daughter of Samuel Hayes), Catherine Fairchild
- Children: Matthew Seymour, Samuel Seymour, Thomas Seymour, Jehiel Seymour, Hannah Seymour St. John, Elizabeth Seymour Bouton, Ruth Seymour Smith, Sarah Seymour Bouton; Catherine Seymour, Susanna Seymour Rusco, Daniel Seymour

Military service
- Rank: Captain (May 26, 1729)
- Unit: North Company at Norwalk

Matthew Seymour (also Matthew Seamer, and Matthew Seamore) (May 1669 – 1735) was a member of the Connecticut House of Representatives from Norwalk in the sessions of October 1712, and October 1713. He was one of the founding settlers of Ridgefield, Connecticut.

He was the son of Thomas Seamer, the Norwalk settler and Hannah Marvin.

He served as a selectman of Norwalk.

On September 30, 1708, he, along with John Belding, Matthias St. John, and Samuel Keeler entered into an agreement with the native leader Catoonah to purchase the land today known as Ridgefield.

At a Norwalk town meeting in 1718, Matthew, is picked as part of a 6-man committee to represent the town in a major political dispute.

He was named as a lieutenant in 1710, and was named a captain of the North Company of Norwalk on May 26, 1729.

Preceded by	Member of the Connecticut House of Representatives from Norwalk; October 1712 – May 1713; With: Joseph Platt	Succeeded by
Preceded by	Member of the Connecticut House of Representatives from Norwalk; October 1713 – May 1714; With: Joseph Platt	Succeeded by Samuel Hanford; Samuel Kellogg
