= Lucy Dathan =

American politician from Connecticut

Member of the Connecticut House of Representatives from the 142nd district
- Incumbent
- Assumed office January 9, 2019
- Preceded by: Fred Wilms

Personal details
- Party: Democratic
- Children: 3
- Education: Santa Clara University (BS)

Lucy Dathan is an American politician who serves as a member of the Connecticut House of Representatives from the 142nd district, comprising parts of New Canaan and Norwalk. She was born in St. Louis, Missouri, and has three children.

== Early life and education ==
Dathan was born and raised in St. Louis, Missouri and attended an all-girls school from grade school through high school. She then attended Santa Clara University in Santa Clara, California.

== Career ==
Dathan began her career as an auditor in a Big 4 firm located in San Jose, California, where she qualified as a Certified Public Accountant. She then moved to Poland, securing a job in the financial sector. Next, she moved to London, England, where she worked for over a decade in finance, including as a chief financial officer. She also worked in the financial department of the London Stock Exchange. She eventually moved back to the United States and found work as a CFO.

Dathan, a Democrat affiliated with the Working Families Party, ousted incumbent Republican Fred Wilms in the 2018 Connecticut elections to become the first Democrat to win election in the 142nd House District. She defeated Wilms with 5,991 votes, or 54.5% of the total vote. Wilms received 4,994 votes, or 45.5%.

== Personal life ==
Dathan and her husband have three grown children. They live in New Canaan, Connecticut, having previously lived in Palo Alto, California for nine years.
