= Benjamin Hickox =

American politician (1686–1745)

Member of the Connecticut House of Representatives from Norwalk
- In office May 1728 – October 1728 Serving with Joseph Platt
- Preceded by: Joseph Platt, Samuel Comstock
- Succeeded by: Samuel Comstock

Personal details
- Born: 1686 Waterbury, Connecticut Colony
- Died: November 17, 1745 Wilton parish, Norwalk, Connecticut Colony
- Resting place: Sharp Hill Cemetery, Wilton, Connecticut
- Spouse(s): Sarah Lockwood Hickox (m. February 3, 1714) (previously married to Nathaniel Selleck and then after being widowed by Benjamin Hickox married Samuel Kellogg at the age of seventy-eight)
- Children: Silas Hickox, Ezra Hickock, Abigail Hickock, Bethel Hickock, Sarah Hickock
- Occupation: deacon, miller

Benjamin Hickox (also Benjamin Hickcox) (1686 – November 17, 1745) was a member of the Connecticut House of Representatives from Norwalk, Connecticut Colony in the session of May 1728.

He was the son of Samuel Hickox, and Hannah Upson.

He operated a gristmill which was located behind the present site of the Congregational Church in Wilton where there is a waterfall over the Comstock Brook (the Falls Branch of the Norwalk River). The mill served as a gathering place where local residents organized their efforts for status as a parish. He was the first deacon of the Congregational Church in Wilton.

Preceded by Joseph Platt; Samuel Comstock	Member of the Connecticut House of Representatives from Norwalk; May 1728–October 1728; With: Joseph Platt	Succeeded by Samuel Comstock
