= Lawrence F. Cafero =

American politician

Lawrence Cafero Jr.
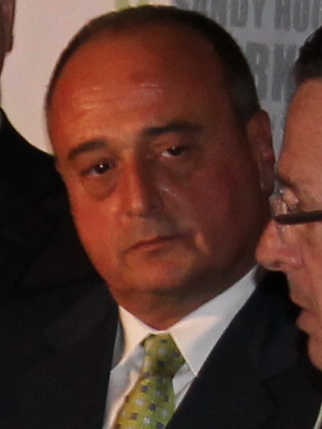

Minority Leader of the Connecticut House of Representatives
- In office January 3, 2007 – January 7, 2015
- Preceded by: Robert Ward
- Succeeded by: Themis Klarides

Member of the Connecticut House of Representatives from the 142nd district
- In office January 6, 1993 – January 7, 2015
- Preceded by: Margaret Gill
- Succeeded by: Friederich Wilms

Personal details
- Born: January 8, 1958 Bridgeport, Connecticut, U.S.
- Party: Republican
- Spouse: Barbara
- Children: Jacqueline, Christopher, and Nicholas
- Education: University of Connecticut; Western New England College School of Law

Lawrence F. Cafero Jr. (born January 8, 1958, in Bridgeport, Connecticut) is an eleven-term Republican member of the Connecticut House of Representatives, having represented parts of Norwalk and New Canaan in the 142nd District from 1992 until 2015. He served as House Minority Leader from 2007-2015.

== Early life and family ==
Cafero was raised from an early age in Norwalk, and attended Norwalk schools. Cafero graduated from Norwalk High School and received a Bachelor of Arts degree in political science from the University of Connecticut. He earned his J.D. from Western New England College School of Law. He lives in Norwalk with his wife Barbara, where they raised their three children. He was an attorney and associate of Patricia Kane Legal Group in 1983. He opened his own law office in 1983, and continued until 1985. He entered into a partnership Reid and Cafero in 1983 and continued until 1998. He has been a partner at Brown, Rudnick, Berlack, Israels, Limited Liability Partnership from 1998 up to the present.

== Political career ==
Cafero first became a member of the Norwalk Republican Town Committee in 1987. He was a member of the Norwalk Board of Education for six years from 1987 to 1993, and served as its chairman in 1988, 1991, and 1992. He also served as Expulsion Hearing Officer for the Norwalk school system. He left his position with the Board of Education when he was elected to the state House of Representatives in 1992. He was elected Deputy House Minority Leader in 1996, and served in that capacity until 2007. In 2007, he was elected House Minority Leader, a post which he held until his retirement in 2015. He was the chairman of the Connecticut House Republican Caucus since 2007. In 2014, Cafero announced that he would be retiring from the General Assembly after 22 years of service.

As minority leader, Cafero was forced to confront two federal investigations that touched his caucus while in office. Cafero himself has never been the focus or subject of any investigation. In 2012, a federal informant attempted to offer Cafero an illegal campaign contribution in the form of cash. Cafero declined and was videotaped instructing the informant of the proper process of making a contribution, telling him to leave his office. No illegal contributions were ever accepted and the informant was subsequently convicted of fraud. On April 27, 2015, Cafero's former legislative Chief of Staff George Gallo entered a plea of guilty to mail fraud in Federal Court. In his plea, Gallo "conceded he lied when he repeatedly denied to candidates and to his boss, former House Minority Leader Lawrence Cafero Jr., that he was profiting personally by referrals to the direct mail vendor."

Lawrence Cafero's 22-year career has been praised and celebrated by the public, the press, and politicians of all parties. In October 2014, being hailed as "Larry Legend", Cafero was inducted into the Norwalk High School Hall of Fame. A testimonial dinner was held in his honor on January 29, 2015, in Norwalk, Connecticut. The event was attended by over 500 guests, and all of the proceeds from the dinner, totaling close to $15,000, went to the Norwalk Education Foundation.

== Associations ==
- Member, Exchange Club, 1990–present
- Member, Saint Anne's Club, 1992–present
- Chair, Board of Directors, Side By Side Community Charter School, 1997–present
- Member, Dean's Advisory Board, Neag School of Education, University of Connecticut, 2001–present
- Member, American Bar Association
- Member, Communities in Schools, Incorporated
- Member, Connecticut Trial Lawyers Association
- Member, District E Republican Town Committee, City of Norwalk
- Member, Greater Norwalk Chamber of Commerce
- Member, Knights of Columbus, 4th Degree
- Member, Stamford-Norwalk Bar Association
- Former Expulsion Officer, Norwalk Public Schools
- Former Scripture Reader, Saint Matthew Church, Norwalk

Connecticut House of Representatives
Preceded by Margaret Gill	Member of the House of Representatives of Connecticut for the 142nd District; 1993–2015	Succeeded by Friedrich Wilms
