= Samuel Comstock =

American politician

Member of the Connecticut House of Representatives from Norwalk
- In office October 1711 – May 1712 Serving with Joseph Platt
- Preceded by: Samuel Hanford
- In office October 1714 – May 1715 Serving with Joseph Platt
- Preceded by: Samuel Hanford, Samuel Kellogg
- Succeeded by: John Betts, John Read
- In office May 1720 – October 1720 Serving with Samuel Hanford
- Preceded by: Joseph Platt, Samuel Hanford
- Succeeded by: Joseph Platt, James Brown
- In office October 1723 – May 1724 Serving with James Lockwood
- Succeeded by: Eliphalet Lockwood, Matthew Gregory
- In office October 1725 – May 1726 Serving with Joseph Platt
- Preceded by: John Benedict
- Succeeded by: James Lockwood, Thomas Fitch
- In office October 1726 – May 1727 Serving with Joseph Platt
- Preceded by: James Lockwood, Thomas Fitch
- Succeeded by: James Lockwood, Thomas Fitch
- In office October 1727 – May 1728 Serving with Joseph Platt
- Preceded by: James Lockwood, Thomas Fitch
- Succeeded by: Joseph Platt, Benjamin Hickox
- In office October 1728 – May 1729 Serving with Joseph Platt
- Preceded by: Joseph Platt, Benjamin Hickox
- Succeeded by: James Lockwood, Thomas Fitch
- In office October 1729 – May 1730 Serving with Joseph Platt
- Preceded by: James Lockwood, Thomas Fitch
- Succeeded by: Thomas Fitch, Joseph Birchard
- In office October 1730 – May 1731 Serving with Joseph Platt
- Preceded by: Thomas Fitch, Joseph Birchard
- Succeeded by: Joseph Platt

Personal details
- Born: February 6, 1680 Norwalk, Connecticut Colony
- Died: October 26, 1752 (aged 72) Norwalk, Connecticut Colony
- Resting place: East Norwalk Historical Cemetery, Norwalk, Connecticut
- Spouse(s): Sarah Hanford (daughter of Reverend Thomas Hanford, m. December 27, 1705)
- Children: Sarah Comstock Betts, Samuel Comstock, Jr., Mary Comstock Trowbridge, Nathan Comstock, Lydia Comstock, Daniel Comstock, David Comstock

Military service
- Rank: Captain (May 1730)
- Unit: South Company at Norwalk

Samuel Comstock (February 6, 1680 – October 26, 1752) was a member of the Connecticut House of Representatives from Norwalk in the sessions of October 1711, October 1714, May 1720, October 1723, October 1725, October 1726, October 1727, October 1728, October 1729, and October 1730.

He was the son of Christopher Comstock and Hannah Platt.

Preceded by Samuel Hanford	Member of the Connecticut House of Representatives from Norwalk; October 1711 – May 1712; With: Joseph Platt	Succeeded by
Preceded by Samuel Hanford; Samuel Kellogg	Member of the Connecticut House of Representatives from Norwalk; October 1714 – May 1715; With: Joseph Platt	Succeeded by John Betts; John Read
Preceded by Joseph Platt; Samuel Hanford	Member of the Connecticut House of Representatives from Norwalk; May 1720 – October 1720; With: Samuel Hanford	Succeeded by Joseph Platt; James Brown
Preceded by	Member of the Connecticut House of Representatives from Norwalk; October 1723 – May 1724; With: James Lockwood	Succeeded by Eliphalet Lockwood; Matthew Gregory
Preceded by John Benedict	Member of the Connecticut House of Representatives from Norwalk; October 1725 – May 1726; With: Joseph Platt	Succeeded by James Lockwood; Thomas Fitch
Preceded by James Lockwood; Thomas Fitch	Member of the Connecticut House of Representatives from Norwalk; October 1726 – May 1727; With: Joseph Platt	Succeeded by James Lockwood; Thomas Fitch
Preceded by James Lockwood; Thomas Fitch	Member of the Connecticut House of Representatives from Norwalk; October 1727 – May 1728; With: Joseph Platt	Succeeded by Joseph Platt; Benjamin Hickox
Preceded by Benjamin Hickox; Joseph Platt	Member of the Connecticut House of Representatives from Norwalk; October 1728 – May 1729; With: Joseph Platt	Succeeded by James Lockwood; Thomas Fitch
Preceded by James Lockwood; Thomas Fitch	Member of the Connecticut House of Representatives from Norwalk; October 1729 – May 1730; With: Joseph Platt	Succeeded by Thomas Fitch; Joseph Birchard
Preceded by Thomas Fitch; Joseph Birchard	Member of the Connecticut House of Representatives from Norwalk; October 1730 – May 1731; With: Joseph Platt	Succeeded by Joseph Platt
