= John R. Raymond =

American nephrologist

John Raymond

6th President of the Medical College of Wisconsin
- In office July 1, 2010 – June 30, 2026

Personal details
- Education: Ohio State University (BS, MD)

John R. Raymond is an American nephrologist and academic administrator serving as the sixth President and CEO of the Medical College of Wisconsin, Wisconsin's only private medical school.

== Education ==
Raymond attended Archbishop Hoban High School in Akron, Ohio, he graduated in 1974. He earned a bachelor's degree from Ohio State University in 1978 and a Doctor of Medicine from the Ohio State University College of Medicine in 1982. He completed his residency and nephrology fellowship at the Duke University Hospital.

== Career ==
After completing his residency, Raymond joined the faculty of the Duke University School of Medicine. He served as Associate Chief of Staff for Research at the Ralph H. Johnson VA Medical Center in Charleston, South Carolina. Raymond later served as the Vice President for Academic Affairs and Provost of the Medical University of South Carolina. Raymond became President and CEO of the Medical College of Wisconsin on July 1, 2010. On June 30, 2026 Raymond stepped down as President and CEO of the Medical College of Wisconsin.
