= Samuel Hanford =

American politician

Member of the Connecticut House of Representatives from Norwalk
- In office October 1705 – May 1706 Serving with Thomas Betts
- Preceded by: John Belding, Joseph Platt
- Succeeded by: Samuel Keeler, John Copp
- In office May 1707 – October 1707 Serving with Thomas Betts
- Preceded by: Joseph Platt
- Succeeded by: Joseph Platt
- In office May 1708 – October 1708
- Preceded by: Joseph Platt
- Succeeded by: Joseph Platt, John Betts
- In office May 1711 – October 1711
- Preceded by: John Betts
- Succeeded by: Joseph Platt, Samuel Comstock
- In office May 1714 – October 1714 Serving with Samuel Kellogg
- Preceded by: Joseph Platt, Matthew Seymour
- Succeeded by: Joseph Platt, Samuel Comstock
- In office October 1717 – May 1718 Serving with John Read
- Succeeded by: John Bartlett , Samuel Marvin
- In office October 1719 – October 1720 Serving with Joseph Platt, Samuel Comstock
- Preceded by: John Copp, Joseph Platt
- Succeeded by: James Brown, Joseph Platt
- In office October 1722 – May 1723 Serving with Joseph Platt
- Preceded by: John Benedict
- In office October 1733 – May 1734 Serving with Joseph Platt
- Preceded by: Joseph Platt, James Lockwood
- Succeeded by: Joseph Birchard, John Marvin
- In office May 1735 – May 1738 Serving with James Lockwood, John Betts, Jr., Samuel Fitch, Joseph Platt, Thomas Benedict
- Preceded by: Joseph Platt, Daniel Hoyt
- Succeeded by: James Lockwood, John Marvin

Town Clerk of the Town of Norwalk
- In office 1707–1708
- Preceded by: James Olmsted
- Succeeded by: John Copp

Personal details
- Born: April 22, 1674 Norwalk, Connecticut Colony
- Died: February 2, 1751 (aged 76) Norwalk, Connecticut Colony
- Resting place: East Norwalk Historical Cemetery, Norwalk, Connecticut
- Spouse: Isabell Haynes
- Children: Samuel Hanford, Jr., William Hanford, Thaddeus Hanford, Haynes Hanford, Hezekiah Hanford, Hanford Isabell Hall

Military service
- Rank: Captain (October 1719)
- Unit: Norwalk Trainband

Samuel Hanford (April 22, 1674 – February 2, 1751) was a member of the Connecticut House of Representatives from Norwalk in the sessions of October 1705, May 1707, May 1708, May 1711, May 1714, October 1717, October 1719, May 1720, October 1722, October 1733, May and October 1735, May and October 1736, and May and October 1737. He also served as Norwalk town clerk from 1707 to 1708. He served as a justice of the peace for Norwalk in 1711, 1723, 1724, and from 1735 until his death in 1751. He served as a selectman for seven years.

He was the son of Reverend Thomas Hanford and Mary Miles.

Preceded by John Belding; Joseph Platt	Member of the Connecticut House of Representatives from Norwalk; October 1705–May 1706; With: Thomas Betts	Succeeded by Samuel Keeler; John Copp
Preceded by Joseph Platt	Member of the Connecticut House of Representatives from Norwalk; May 1707–October 1707; With: Thomas Betts	Succeeded by Joseph Platt
Preceded by James Olmsted	Town Clerk of the Town of Norwalk; 1707–1708	Succeeded by John Copp
Preceded by Joseph Platt	Member of the Connecticut House of Representatives from Norwalk; May 1708–October 1708	Succeeded by Joseph Platt; John Betts
Preceded by John Betts	Member of the Connecticut House of Representatives from Norwalk; May 1711–October 1711	Succeeded by Joseph Platt; Samuel Comstock
Preceded by Joseph Platt; Matthew Seymour	Member of the Connecticut House of Representatives from Norwalk; May 1714–October 1714; With: Samuel Kellogg	Succeeded by Joseph Platt; Samuel Comstock
Preceded by	Member of the Connecticut House of Representatives from Norwalk; October 1717–May 1718; With: John Read	Succeeded by John Bartlett; Samuel Marvin
Preceded by John Copp; Joseph Platt	Member of the Connecticut House of Representatives from Norwalk; October 1719–October 1720; With: Joseph Platt; Samuel Comstock	Succeeded by James Brown; Joseph Platt
Preceded by James Lockwood; John Benedict	Member of the Connecticut House of Representatives from Norwalk; October 1722–May 1723; With: Joseph Platt	Succeeded by
Preceded by Joseph Platt; James Lockwood	Member of the Connecticut House of Representatives from Norwalk; October 1733–May 1734; With: Joseph Platt	Succeeded by Joseph Birchard; John Marvin
Preceded by Joseph Platt; Daniel Hoyt	Member of the Connecticut House of Representatives from Norwalk; May 1735–May 1738; With: James Lockwood; John Betts, Jr. Samuel Fitch; Joseph Platt; Thomas Benedict	Succeeded by James Lockwood; John Marvin
