= Thomas Benedict (II) =

American politician

Member of the House of Representatives of the Colony of Connecticut from Norwalk
- In office May 1737 – October 1737 Serving with Samuel Hanford
- Preceded by: Samuel Hanford, John Betts, Jr.
- Succeeded by: Joseph Platt, Samuel Hanford
- In office October 1740 – May 1741 Serving with James Lockwood
- Preceded by: James Lockwood, Samuel Cluckston
- Succeeded by: John Betts, Jr., John Belding, Jr.
- In office October 1744 – May 1745 Serving with Samuel Fitch
- Preceded by: Samuel Fitch
- Succeeded by: Joseph Platt, Samuel Fitch

Personal details
- Born: 1682 Norwalk, Connecticut Colony
- Died: July 5, 1763 Norwalk, Connecticut Colony
- Spouse: Millicent Hyatt (m. 1705)
- Children: Ebenezer Benedict, David Benedict, John Benedict, Thomas Benedict, Betty Benedict, Seth Benedict

Military service
- Rank: Sergeant (1713), Ensign (1724), Lieutenant (1742), Captain (1746)

Thomas Benedict (1682 – July 5, 1763) was a member of the House of Representatives of the Colony of Connecticut from Norwalk in the sessions of May 1737, October 1740, and October 1744. He was chosen as selectman at least seven times, and was moderator of the town meetings not less than ten times.

He was the son of John Benedict and Phoebe Gregory.

He held a military position for most of his life, and was named a captain in 1746. It is recorded that his voice could be heard and understood at the distance of more than a mile.

Preceded by Samuel Hanford; John Betts, Jr.	Member of the House of Representatives of the Colony of Connecticut from Norwalk; May 1737 – October 1737; With: Samuel Hanford	Succeeded by Joseph Platt; Samuel Hanford
Preceded by James Lockwood; Samuel Cluckston	Member of the House of Representatives of the Colony of Connecticut from Norwalk; October 1740 – May 1741; With: James Lockwood	Succeeded by John Betts, Jr. John Belding, Jr.
Preceded by Samuel Fitch	Member of the House of Representatives of the Colony of Connecticut from Norwalk; October 1744 – May 1745; With: Samuel Fitch	Succeeded by Joseph Platt; Samuel Fitch
