= John Benedict =

American politician (1649–1729)

Member of the Connecticut House of Representatives from Norwalk
- In office May 1722 – October 1722 Serving with James Lockwood
- Succeeded by: Joseph Platt, Samuel Hanford
- In office May 1725 – October 1725
- Preceded by: James Lockwood, Joseph Platt
- Succeeded by: Joseph Platt, Samuel Comstock

Personal details
- Born: February 6, 1649 Southold, Long Island, New Haven Colony
- Died: November 11, 1729 (aged 80) Norwalk, Connecticut Colony
- Resting place: East Norwalk Historical Cemetery, Norwalk, Connecticut
- Spouse(s): Phoebe Gregory (daughter of John Gregory, m. November 11, 1670)
- Children: Sarah Benedict, Phoebe Benedict, John Benedict, Jr., Jonathan Benedict, Benjamin Benedict, Joseph Benedict, Thomas Benedict, James Benedict
- Occupation: deacon

John Benedict (February 6, 1649 – November 11, 1729) was a member of the Connecticut House of Representatives from Norwalk, Connecticut Colony in the sessions of May 1722 and May 1725.

He was born in 1649, in Southold, Long Island which was part of the New Haven Colony at the time. He was the son of Thomas Benedict and Mary Brigham Benedict. He moved with his family to Norwalk.

He succeeded his father as deacon, and served in that position until old age. He was named a freeman 1680. He served as a selectman in 1689, from 1692 to 94 and in 1699. He was appointed part of committees to recruit a minister and a schoolmaster.

In 1686, he drew home-lot #27 in Norwalk, and in 1678, he bought a 4 acre home lot on Dry Hill.

The church honored him by voting to allow him to sit "in ye seat before ye pulpit" in 1705.

Preceded by	Member of the Connecticut House of Representatives from Norwalk; May 1722 – October 1722; With: James Lockwood	Succeeded by Joseph Platt; Samuel Hanford
Preceded by James Lockwood; Joseph Platt	Member of the Connecticut House of Representatives from Norwalk; May 1725 – October 1725	Succeeded by Joseph Platt; Samuel Comstock
