= William Pitkin =

American politician, militia officer, and judge (1694–1769)

31st Deputy Governor Connecticut
- In office 1754–1766
- Preceded by: Thomas Fitch IV
- Succeeded by: Jonathan Trumbull, Sr.

15th Governor of Connecticut Colony
- In office 1766 – October 1, 1769
- Preceded by: Thomas Fitch
- Succeeded by: Jonathan Trumbull Sr.

Personal details
- Born: April 30, 1694 Hartford, Connecticut
- Died: October 1, 1769 (aged 75) Hartford, Connecticut
- Spouse: Mary Woodbridge Pitkin
- Children: William Pitkin, IV; Timothy; George; Epraphas; Ashebel

William Pitkin (April 30, 1694 – October 1, 1769) was an American politician, militia officer, and judge who served as the governor of Connecticut from 1766 to 1769.

== Biography ==
Pitkin was born to a politically prominent family in Hartford (Now East Hartford) in 1694. His grandfather was William Pitkin IV, attorney general of Connecticut. and negotiating commissioner to Gov. Benjamin Fletcher of New York. Through his grandaunt Martha, he was a cousin of deputy governor Roger Wolcott, Founding Father Oliver Wolcott, and Gov. Oliver Wolcott Jr., who succeeded Hamilton as Secretary of the Treasury.

He married Mary Woodbridge on May 7, 1724, and had five children, William, Timothy, George, Epraphas, and Ashebel; one of whom, William IV, was elected a member of the US Congress.

== Career ==
Coat of Arms of William Pitkin

Pitkin was first elected to the colonial assembly in 1728, where he served through 1734, the last two years as speaker of the house. He was a member or the Council of Assistants from 1734 to 1754. He was Captain of the Trainband, East Society from 1730 to 1738; Major of the 1st Regiment from 1738 to 1739; and Colonel of the 1st Regiment from 1739 to 1754. He was also active in the colonial militia, raising troops in East Hartford for an expedition to the Spanish West Indies during the War of Jenkins' Ear in 1740.

In 1735 Pitkin was elected county judge, and in 1741 he became a superior court judge, a post he would hold until he was elected governor in 1766. In 1754 he was also elected deputy governor, serving under Thomas Fitch, and as Chief Justice, Connecticut Superior Court, an office tied to the deputy governorship.

Fitch's attempts to implement the unpopular Stamp Act may have led to Pitkin's election ahead of Fitch in the 1766 election. Pitkin was opposed to the Stamp Act and other attempts by the British Parliament to tax the colonies, and he served as governor from 1766 to 1769.

== Death and legacy ==
Pitkin died in East Hartford (then Hartford) on October 1, 1769, while serving as governor, and is interred there at Center Cemetery. He is commemorated by his town's Governor William Pitkin Elementary School. A descendant of his family is Yale missionary Horace Tracy Pitkin.

Political offices
| Preceded by Thomas Fitch | Governor of the Connecticut Colony; 1766–69 | Succeeded by Jonathan Trumbull |
