= John Betts (Connecticut politician) =

American politician

Member of the House of Representatives of the Colony of Connecticut from Norwalk
- In office October 1708 – October 1709 Serving with Joseph Platt, Samuel Keeler
- Preceded by: Samuel Hanford
- Succeeded by: Samuel Keeler, Joseph Platt
- In office October 1710 – May 1711
- Preceded by: Samuel Betts, Joseph Platt
- Succeeded by: Samuel Hanford
- In office May 1715 – October 1715 Serving with John Read
- Preceded by: Joseph Platt, Samuel Comstock
- In office May 1716 – October 1716 Serving with John Copp
- Succeeded by: Joseph Platt, John Raymond, Jr.

Personal details
- Born: June 20, 1650 Guilford, New Haven Colony
- Died: ca. June 1730 Wilton parish, Norwalk, Connecticut Colony
- Spouse(s): Hannah Bell or Mercy Fowler, Sarah Kellogg (daughter of Daniel Kellogg, widow of Samuel Brinsmade)
- Children: both by first marriage: John Betts, Jr., Hannah Betts

John Betts (June 20, 1650 – c.June 1730) was a member of the House of Representatives of the Colony of Connecticut from Norwalk in the sessions of October 1708, May 1709, October 1710, May 1715, and May 1716.

He was born June 20, 1650, in Guilford, which at the time was a part of the New Haven Colony. He was the son of Thomas Betts and Sarah Marvin.

Preceded by Samuel Hanford	Member of the House of Representatives of the Colony of Connecticut from Norwalk; October 1708 – October 1709; With: Joseph Platt; Samuel Keeler	Succeeded by Samuel Keeler; Joseph Platt
Preceded by Samuel Betts; Joseph Platt	Member of the House of Representatives of the Colony of Connecticut from Norwalk; October 1710 – May 1711	Succeeded by Samuel Hanford
Preceded by Joseph Platt; Samuel Comstock	Member of the House of Representatives of the Colony of Connecticut from Norwalk; May 1715 – October 1715; With: John Read	Succeeded by
Preceded by	Member of the House of Representatives of the Colony of Connecticut from Norwalk; May 1716 – October 1716; With: John Copp	Succeeded by Joseph Platt; John Raymond, Jr.
