= John Raymond Jr. =

American politician

Member of the Connecticut House of Representatives from Norwalk
- In office October 1716 – May 1717 Serving with Joseph Platt
- Preceded by: John Copp, John Betts

Personal details
- Born: September 9, 1665 Norwalk, Connecticut Colony
- Died: April 12, 1737 (aged 71) Norwalk, Connecticut Colony
- Resting place: East Norwalk Historical Cemetery, Norwalk, Connecticut
- Spouse: Elizabeth St. John (m. March 7, 1690)
- Children: Mary Raymond Street, Hannah Raymond Finch, Lemuel Raymond, Jabez Raymond, John Raymond, Elizabeth Raymond, Elija Raymond, Sarah Raymond Burwell, Zuriel Raymond, Ashael Raymond
- Occupation: surveyor

Military service
- Rank: Captain (1710)
- Unit: Norwalk Trainband

John Raymond Jr. (September 9, 1665 – April 12, 1737) was a member of the Connecticut House of Representatives from Norwalk, Connecticut Colony, in the October 1716 session.

He was the son of John Raymond and Mary Betts.

On December 16, 1713, Raymond was appointed by a majority vote of a town meeting to a committee including Joseph Platt and James Stewart to establish a road to Ridgefield.

Preceded by John Copp; John Betts	Member of the Connecticut House of Representatives from Norwalk; October 1716 – May 1717; With: Joseph Platt	Succeeded by
