= Frank Comstock (politician) =

American politician (1856–1914)

14th Mayor of South Norwalk, Connecticut
- In office 1889–1889
- Preceded by: William B. Hubbell
- Succeeded by: Edwin Wilcox

Member of the Connecticut House of Representatives from Norwalk
- In office 1893–

Personal details
- Born: August 19, 1856 Wilton, Connecticut, US
- Died: October 6, 1914 (aged 58)
- Party: Republican
- Spouse: Sarah Berry (d. November 13, 1888)
- Occupation: Hatter

Frank Comstock (August 19, 1856 – October 6, 1914) was an American politician and one-term Republican mayor of South Norwalk, Connecticut in 1889. He was born in Wilton in 1856. He was the son of John R. Comstock and Helen Eugenia Whitney. He served for three years as a Burgess of the Borough of Norwalk. Comstock served in the Connecticut House of Representatives in 1893.

In 1882, Comstock founded, along with Samuel Raymond, the Raymond & Comstock Company, a hat factory at 50 Day Street, in Norwalk.

Preceded by William B. Hubbell	Mayor of South Norwalk, Connecticut; 1889	Succeeded by Edwin Wilcox
