= Former Norwalk City Hall =

- U.S. National Register of Historic Places
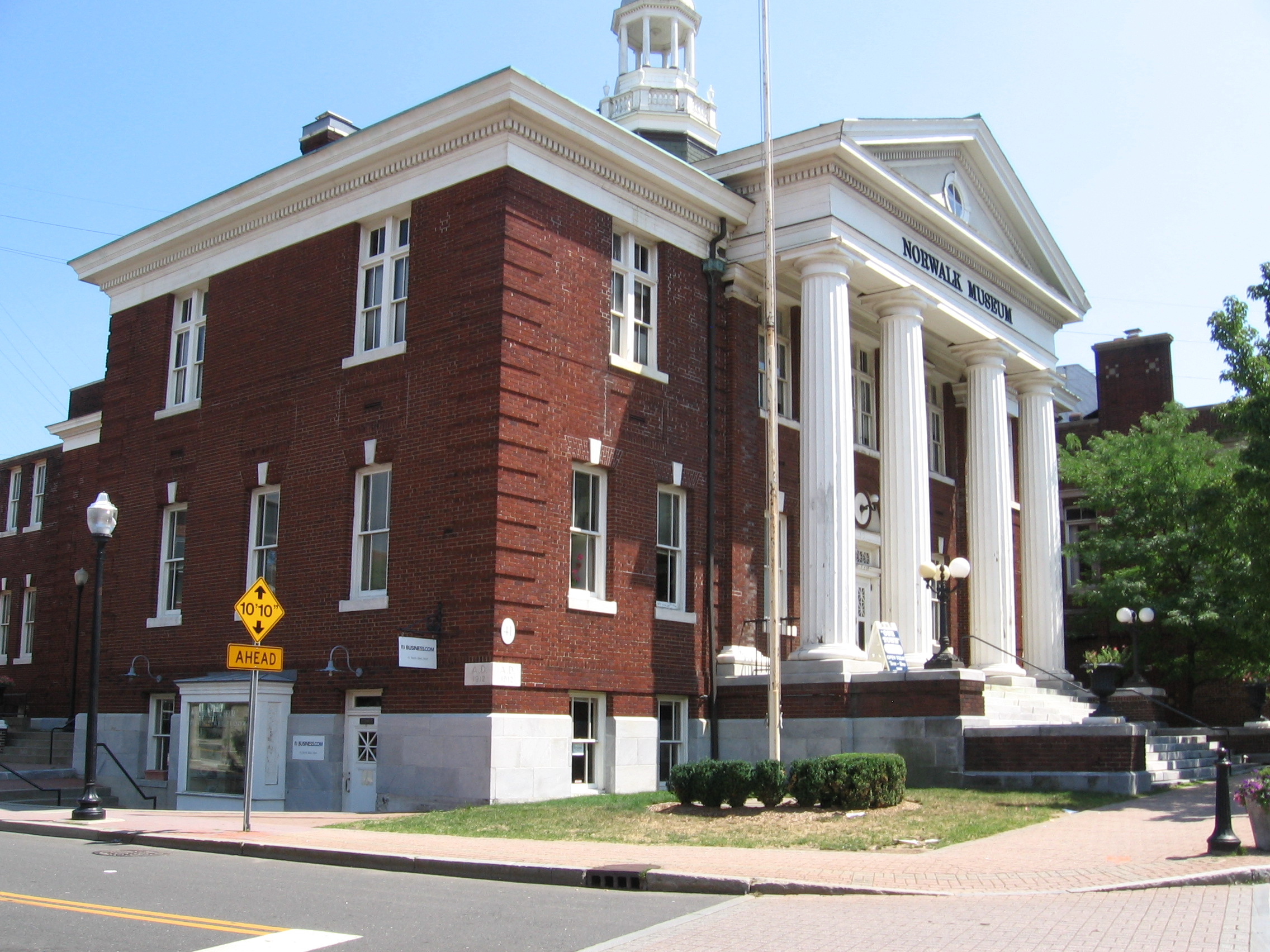

- Location within Connecticut Location within the United States
- Location: 41 North Main Street, South Norwalk, Connecticut
- Coordinates: 41.1001737°N 73.418611°W
- Area: less than one acre
- Built: 1912
- Architect: Bissell, Frank H.; Barber, Joel D.
- Architectural style: Colonial Revival
- NRHP reference No.: 95000282
- Added to NRHP: March 23, 1995

The former Norwalk City Hall, located in South Norwalk was built in 1912. The building has since been added, on March 23, 1995, to the National Register of Historic Places. Norwalk's city hall is now located at 125 East Avenue.

After Norwalk's City Hall relocated, the first and second floors of the structure became Norwalk Historical Society Museum, which was operated by the city. As a museum, the building contained archival materials and other items related to Norwalk's culture and history, including documents, items of significance to the history of Norwalk and artwork.

In May 2012, the city removed funding for operation of the museum as well for the cost of renting the building, no longer owned by the city, despite the several thousand visitors annually.

== See also ==
- National Register of Historic Places listings in Fairfield County, Connecticut
