= Thomas Fitch (governor) =

American judge and politician

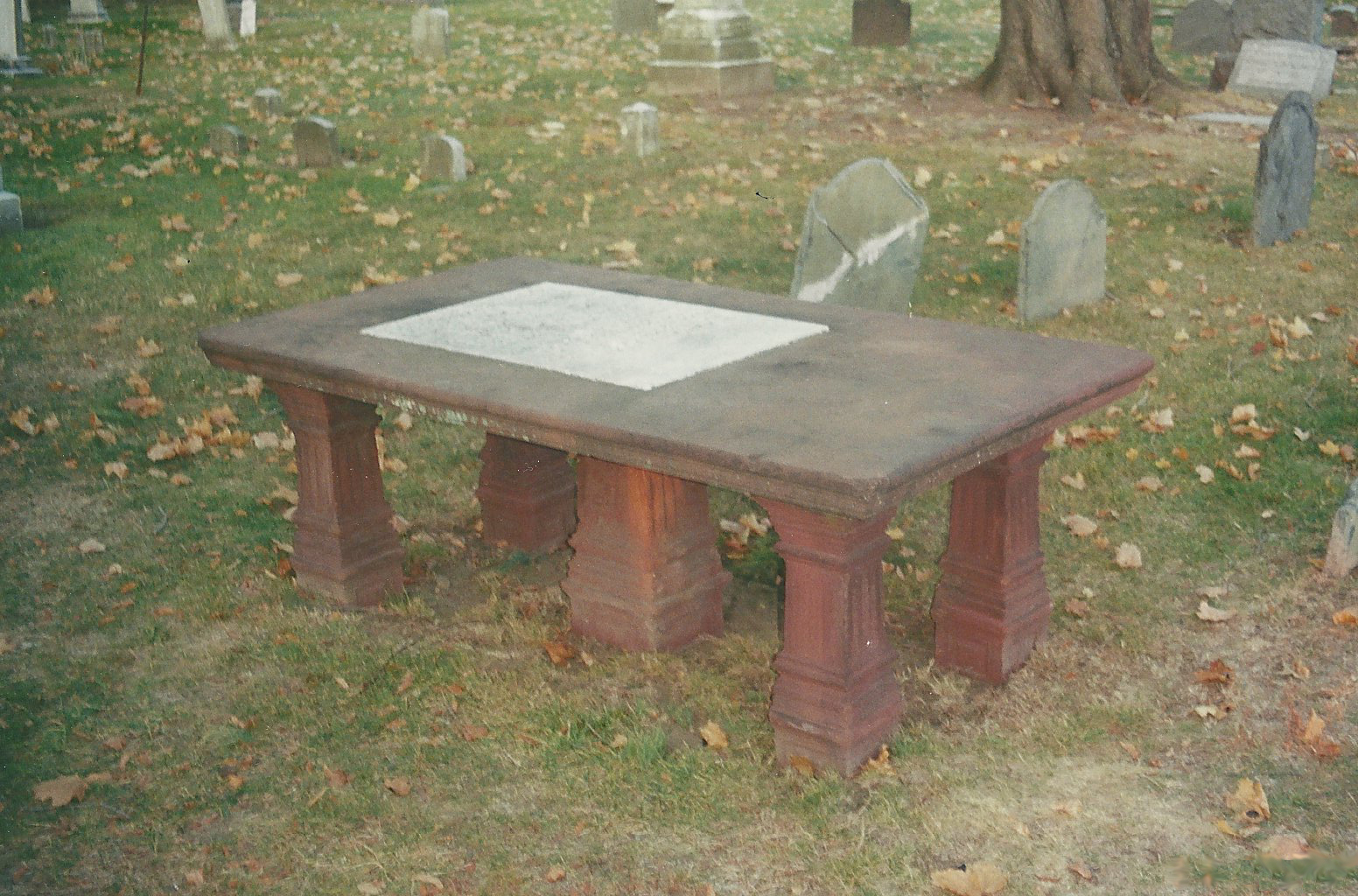
- The table tomb of Thomas Fitch in East Norwalk Cemetery

29th colonial governor of Connecticut
- In office 1754–1766
- Preceded by: Roger Wolcott
- Succeeded by: William Pitkin

Member of the House of Representatives of the Connecticut Colony representing Norwalk
- In office May 1726 – October 1726 Serving with James Lockwood
- Preceded by: Joseph Platt, Samuel Comstock
- Succeeded by: Joseph Platt, Samuel Comstock
- In office May 1727 – October 1727 Serving with James Lockwood
- Preceded by: Joseph Platt, Samuel Comstock
- Succeeded by: Joseph Platt, Samuel Comstock
- In office May 1729 – October 1729 Serving with James Lockwood
- Preceded by: Joseph Platt, Samuel Comstock
- Succeeded by: Joseph Platt, Samuel Comstock
- In office May 1730 – October 1730 Serving with Joseph Birchard
- Preceded by: Joseph Platt, Samuel Comstock
- Succeeded by: Joseph Platt, Samuel Comstock

Member of the Connecticut General Assembly Council of Assistants
- In office 1734–1746

Personal details
- Born: c. 1699 Norwalk, Connecticut Colony
- Died: July 18, 1774 Norwalk, Connecticut Colony
- Resting place: East Norwalk Historical Cemetery, Norwalk, Connecticut
- Education: Yale College
- Profession: lawyer

Thomas Fitch (c. 1699 – July 18, 1774) was an American judge and politician who served as the governor of Connecticut from 1754 to 1766.

== Family and early life ==
Coat of Arms of Thomas Fitch

Fitch was born at Norwalk, Connecticut, the son of Thomas Fitch III (1675–1731), an investor in the Equivalent Lands and his first wife, Sarah Boardman Fitch. He graduated from Yale in 1721 then went on to obtain a master's degree. Fitch married Hannah Hall in 1724. The couple had several children, the first Thomas Fitch, V, was born in 1725. Fitch served as Norwalk Justice of the Peace, Deputy and Assistant to the Connecticut General Assembly, Deputy Governor, Chief Justice (to the Connecticut Superior Court), and finally Governor of the Colony of Connecticut.

Fitch died July 18, 1774. He is buried in the East Norwalk Historical Cemetery.

== His grave inscription ==
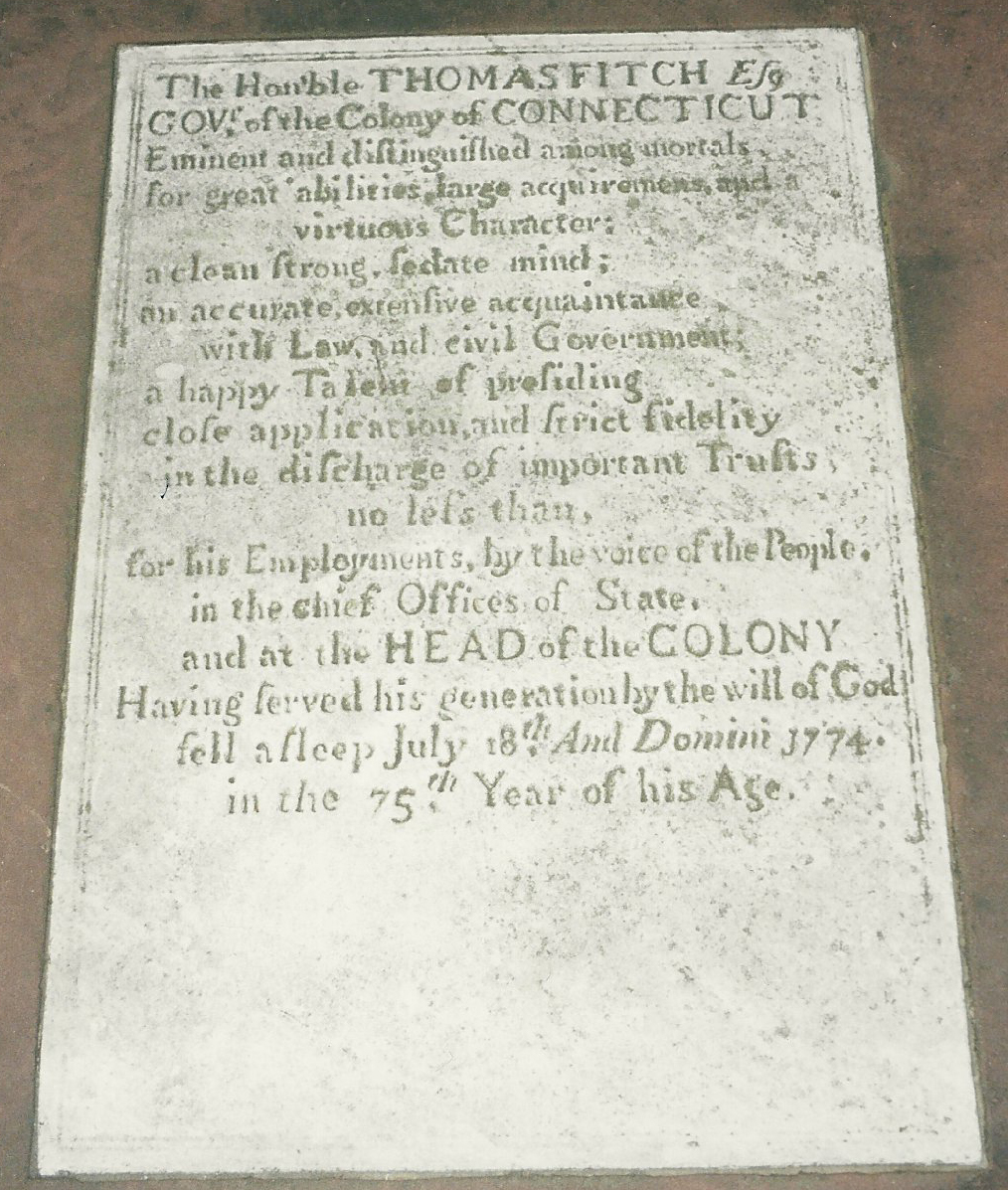

THE HONORABLE THOMAS FITCH, ESQ.
GOV. OF THE COLONY OF CONNECTICUT,

Eminent and distinguished among mortals.
for great abilities, large acquirements, and a
virtuous character.
a clear, strong, sedate mind,
and an accurate, extensive acquaintance
with law and civil government;
a happy talent of presiding,
close application and strict fidelity,
in the discharge of important trusts,
no less than.
for his employments by the voice of the people
in the chief offices of State,
and at the head of the colony.
Having served his generation by the will of God,
fell asleep July 18 in Domini 1774,
in the 75th year of his age.

== Fitch house ==
The Fitch house was partially burned during Tryon's raid, which was carried out by William Tryon's troops in July 1779 and left only one wing of the house was left standing. Fitch descendants lived in the rebuilt house until 1945. In 1956 the Fitch house was relocated to make way for the construction of the Connecticut Turnpike. It stands today as part of the Mill Hill Historic Park in Norwalk next to the Green.

== Legacy ==
Fitch Street in East Norwalk is named in honor of the Fitch family including: Thomas Fitch I (1612–1704), a town founder; Thomas IV, the governor; and Thomas Fitch V, soldier and patriot.

His son, Colonel Thomas Fitch, V (1725–1795), served with British colonial troops in the French and Indian Wars; primarily in upstate New York, near Fort Crailo. After that conflict Thomas, V returned to Norwalk and was a prominent resident during and after the American Revolution. He served as a town councilman and helped with the reconstruction efforts after the burning of Norwalk in 1779.

The former Thomas Fitch school along Strawberry Hill Avenue in Norwalk was named in his honor, as well as to honor the other Thomas Fitches who contributed to the town.

The unincorporated settlement of Fitchville, located in the Firelands area of the historic Connecticut Western Reserve in the State of Ohio, is named for the governor and his family.

Preceded by Joseph Platt; Samuel Comstock	Member of the House of Representatives of the Connecticut Colony representing Norwalk; May 1726 – October 1726; Served alongside: James Lockwood	Succeeded by Joseph Platt; Samuel Comstock
Preceded by Joseph Platt; Samuel Comstock	Member of the House of Representatives of the Connecticut Colony representing Norwalk; May 1727 – October 1727; Served alongside: James Lockwood	Succeeded by Joseph Platt; Samuel Comstock
Preceded by Joseph Platt; Samuel Comstock	Member of the House of Representatives of the Connecticut Colony representing Norwalk; May 1729 – October 1729; Served alongside: James Lockwood	Succeeded by Joseph Platt; Samuel Comstock
Preceded by Joseph Platt; Samuel Comstock	Member of the House of Representatives of the Connecticut Colony representing Norwalk; May 1730 – October 1730; Served alongside: Joseph Birchard	Succeeded by Joseph Platt; Samuel Comstock
Preceded by	Member of the Council of Assistants of the Governor of the Connecticut Colony; 1734–1746	Succeeded by
Preceded by Roger Wolcott	Governor of the Connecticut Colony; 1754–66	Succeeded by William Pitkin
