= Joseph Platt (politician) =

American politician

Member of the House of Representatives of the Colony of Connecticut from Norwalk
- In office 1705–1748

Personal details
- Born: February 17, 1672 Norwalk, Connecticut Colony
- Died: June 12, 1748 (aged 75) Norwalk, Connecticut Colony
- Resting place: East Norwalk Historical Cemetery, Norwalk, Connecticut
- Spouse(s): Elizabeth Marvin (daughter of Matthew Marvin, Jr., m. November 6, 1700, d. 1703), Hannah Hanford (daughter of Reverend Thomas Hanford, m. January 26, 1704)
- Children: Elizabeth Platt Cooke (b. 1701), Hannah Platt Sanford (b. 1704), Joseph Platt, Jr. (b. 1706)

Military service
- Rank: Captain
- Unit: Norwalk Trainband

Joseph Platt (February 17, 1672 – June 12, 1748) was a member of the House of Representatives of the Colony of Connecticut from Norwalk.

He was the longest serving representative from Norwalk and served as a member of the Connecticut House of Representatives between 1705 and 1748, representing Norwalk in 38 sessions.

He was born on February 17, 1672, in Norwalk and is the youngest son of John Platt and Hannah Clark.

He received a grant of 10 acres of land from the town of Norwalk for his services in the "swamp fight," on February 21, 1698. Joseph was a town selectman for a period of nine years.

On June 3, 1723, he was appointed by a town meeting as chairman of committee to seat the new meeting-house.

On February 18, 1725–6, he was appointed at town meeting to a committee to obtain, and set stones for the entrance to the meeting house. At the same meeting, he was appointed to a committee to regulate the difficulties arising from minister Buckingham.

He was the justice of peace for 30 years.

He also served as a commissioner to draw the boundary line between Connecticut and New York, in 1720.

Joseph was Captain of the North Company, of the Norwalk Trainband.

== Notable descendants ==
- Grandfather of Joseph Platt Cooke (1730–1816), American military officer in the Revolutionary War, and also a member of the Connecticut House of Representatives for many years.
- Zephaniah Platt
- Jonas Platt
- Charles Z. Platt
- James Kent
