= John Gregory (settler) =

Deputy of the General Court of the Colony of Connecticut from Norwalk
- In office 1659–1695
- Preceded by: Matthew Canfield
- Succeeded by: Samuel Hayes

Personal details
- Born: c. 1612 Nottinghamshire, England
- Died: August 15, 1689 Norwalk, Connecticut Colony
- Resting place: East Norwalk Historical Cemetery, Norwalk, Connecticut
- Spouse: Sarah St. John (m. 1635)
- Children: John Gregory, Jachin Gregory, Judah Gregory, Joseph Gregory, Thomas Gregory, Phoebe Gregory Benedict (m. John Benedict), Sarah Gregory
- Occupation: Shoemaker, tanner

John Gregory (also John Griggorie) (1612 – August 15, 1689), a cobbler and tanner, was a founding settler of Norwalk, Connecticut. He was a deputy of the General Court of the Connecticut Colony in the sessions of October 1659, October 1662, May 1663, May 1665, October 1667, May 1668, May and October 1669, October 1670, October 1671, May 1674, May 1675, October 1677, May 1679, October 1680, May 1681, October 1695.

== Emigration and residence in New Haven ==
He was born in Nottinghamshire, England, in 1612, the son of Henry Gregory and Mary Goody. He emigrated with his father in the early 1630s. He is known to have lived in the New Haven Colony between 1639 and 1646. In 1644 he was admitted to the New Haven Court. His sons Joseph and Thomas were born in New Haven in 1646 and 1648, respectively.

== Settlement of Norwalk ==
Roger Ludlow purchased the land that would become Norwalk in 1640. Ludlow contracted with fourteen men for the original planting of Norwalk. In 1649, Richard Olmsted and Nathaniel Ely became the first two settlers. One of the fourteen was Richard Webb, whose wife was John Gregory's sister.

John Gregory lived in the East Norwalk section of Norwalk, along what is now East Avenue. He was an active member of the community, holding office almost continuously during his life in Norwalk.

He is listed on the Founders Stone bearing the names of the founding settlers of Norwalk in the East Norwalk Historical Cemetery.

== Settlement of Newark ==
When the New Haven Colony was absorbed into the Connecticut Colony in 1662, many of the Puritan settlers were displeased at the fact that the new colony's constitution didn't include certain restrictions on non-Puritan settlers. The New Haven colonists believed that only members of the Puritan church should be allowed to vote, and that only the children of church members could be baptized.

In response, the New Haven Puritans sent Robert Treat and John Gregory to meet with Philip Carteret, the new Royal Governor of New Jersey. The group chose the present day site of Newark for a new settlement. In May 1666, the Puritan settlers, led by Treat, purchased the land directly from the Hackensack Indians.

Preceded by Matthew Canfield	Deputy of the General Court of the Colony of Connecticut from Norwalk; October 1659	Succeeded by Matthew Canfield
Preceded by Richard Olmsted	Deputy of the General Court of the Colony of Connecticut from Norwalk; October 1662, May 1663; With: Matthew Canfield	Succeeded by Matthew Canfield; Richard Olmsted
Preceded by Matthew Canfield; Richard Olmsted	Deputy of the Connecticut General Assembly of the Colony of Connecticut from Norwalk; May 1665	Succeeded by Matthew Canfield; Richard Olmsted
Preceded by Richard Olmsted	Deputy of the Connecticut General Assembly of the Colony of Connecticut from Norwalk; October 1667, May 1668; With: Walter Hoyt, Richard Olmsted	Succeeded by Richard Olmsted; Walter Hoyt
Preceded by Richard Olmsted; Walter Hoyt	Deputy of the Connecticut General Assembly of the Colony of Connecticut from Norwalk; May and October 1669; With: Richard Olmsted, John Douglas	Succeeded by Walter Hoyt; Thomas Benedict
Preceded by Walter Hoyt; Thomas Benedict	Deputy of the Connecticut General Assembly of the Colony of Connecticut from Norwalk; October 1670; With: Daniel Kellogg	Succeeded by Richard Olmsted; Walter Hoyt
Preceded by Richard Olmsted; Walter Hoyt	Deputy of the Connecticut General Assembly of the Colony of Connecticut from Norwalk; October 1671; With: John Bowton	Succeeded by Walter Hoyt; Daniel Kellogg
Preceded by Walter Hoyt; John Bowton	Deputy of the Connecticut General Assembly of the Colony of Connecticut from Norwalk; May 1674; With: John Bowton	Succeeded by Walter Hoyt; Daniel Kellogg
Preceded by Walter Hoyt; Daniel Kellogg	Deputy of the Connecticut General Assembly of the Colony of Connecticut from Norwalk; May 1675; With: Thomas Benedict, John Bowton	Succeeded by Daniel Kellogg
Preceded by Daniel Kellogg	Deputy of the Connecticut General Assembly of the Colony of Connecticut from Norwalk; October 1677; With: John Bowton	Succeeded by John Bowton; Walter Hoyt
Preceded by Mark Sension; John Platt	Deputy of the Connecticut General Assembly of the Colony of Connecticut from Norwalk; May 1679; With: Richard Olmsted	Succeeded by Daniel Kellogg; John Bowton
Preceded by Daniel Kellogg; John Bowton	Deputy of the Connecticut General Assembly of the Colony of Connecticut from Norwalk; October 1680, May 1681; With: John Platt, John Bowton	Succeeded by Walter Hoyt; John Platt
Preceded by Samuel Hayes; Jachin Gregory	Deputy of the Connecticut General Assembly of the Colony of Connecticut from Norwalk; October 1695	Succeeded by Samuel Hayes
