= Walter Hoyt =

Connecticut settler (1618 – 1698)

Deputy of the General Court of the Connecticut Colony
- In office 1658–1681

Personal details
- Born: September 6, 1618 West Hatch, Somerset, England
- Died: 1698 (aged 79–80) Norwalk, Connecticut
- Spouse(s): Elizabeth Susanna St. John (m. 1638; died 1647) Rhoda Tinker (m. 1649–1698)
- Relations: Nicholas Hoyt (brother)
- Children: Zerubbabel, Elizabeth, John
- Parent(s): Simon Haite; Deborah Stowers

Military service
- Rank: Sergeant (May 1659)
- Unit: Norwalk Trainband

Walter Hoyt (also seen as Haite, Hayte, Hoit, Haight) (September 6, 1618 – 1698) was a founding English settler of Norwalk, Connecticut. He served as a deputy of the General Court of the Connecticut Colony from Norwalk between 1658 and 1662, and, when it was renamed, as a deputy of the Connecticut General Assembly between 1662 and 1681. He was a Norwalk selectman in 1672.

== Early life ==
He was the son of Simon Haite (1595–1657) and Deborah Stowers. He came to America in 1628, with his father and brother, Nicholas Hoyt (b. 1620), at the age of ten.

== Career ==
In 1640, he was known to own about 64 acres of land in Windsor, Connecticut Colony. In 1653, Walter came to Norwalk, among the first settlers.

He served in the General Court of the Connecticut Colony in the sessions of October 1658, May and October 1661, May and October 1667, October 1668, May 1670, May 1671, May 1672, October 1673, October 1674, May 1676, May 1678, and October 1681.

In May 1672, Walter Hoyte was among those whose names were given to the General Court "for the beginning of a plantation neare the backside of Norwalke."

He, along with Ralph Keeler, was contracted by the settlement to cut the timber and build a house for Reverend Thomas Hanford.

He voted in the town meetings in Norwalk, and was confirmed by the General Court as one of the proprietors of Norwalk in 1685.

== Personal life ==
His first wife is unknown. After her death, he married Rhoda Tinker Hobbs Taylor (1611–1698) in 1653 in Windsor, Connecticut. He and Rhoda had one child, Zerubbabel Hoyt. His other three children were from his previous marriage.

- John Hoyt (1644–1711), who married Mary Lindall, daughter of Henry Lindall
- Elizabeth Hoyt, who married Samuel Sension, son of his sister-in-law, Mary Tinker Sension and brother-in-law Mathias Sension(St. John, Senchon)
- Hannah Hoyt, who married Judah Gregory
- Zerubbabel Hoyt (1652–1739), who married Hannah Knapp (1642–1696)

=== Honors ===
Hoyt's Hill, named after Walter Hoyt, is the historical name of the hill in the Green at the northeast corner of East Avenue and Willow Street. The place name dates back at least as early as 1679.

He is listed on the Founders Stone bearing the names of the founding settlers of Norwalk in the East Norwalk Historical Cemetery.

Preceded by Richard Olmsted; Matthew Canfield	Deputy of the General Court of the Colony of Connecticut from Norwalk; October 1658; With: Nathaniel Richards	Succeeded by Matthew Canfield; John Gregory
Preceded by Richard Olmsted; Samuel Hales	Deputy of the General Court of the Colony of Connecticut from Norwalk; May and October 1661; With: Matthew Canfield	Succeeded by Richard Olmsted; Matthew Canfield
Preceded by Richard Olmsted; Matthew Canfield	Deputy of the Connecticut General Assembly of the Colony of Connecticut from Norwalk; May and October 1667; With: Richard Olmsted, John Gregory	Succeeded by Richard Olmsted; John Gregory
Preceded by Richard Olmsted; John Gregory	Deputy of the Connecticut General Assembly of the Colony of Connecticut from Norwalk; October 1668; With: Richard Olmsted	Succeeded by Richard Olmsted
Preceded by John Gregory; John Douglas	Deputy of the Connecticut General Assembly of the Colony of Connecticut from Norwalk; May 1670; With: Thomas Benedict	Succeeded by John Gregory; Daniel Kellogg
Preceded by John Gregory; Daniel Kellogg	Deputy of the Connecticut General Assembly of the Colony of Connecticut from Norwalk; May 1671; With: Richard Olmsted	Succeeded by John Gregory; John Bowton
Preceded by John Gregory; John Bowton	Deputy of the Connecticut General Assembly of the Colony of Connecticut from Norwalk; May 1672; With: Daniel Kellogg	Succeeded by Nicholas Hoyt; Mark Sension
Preceded by Thomas Fitch	Deputy of the Connecticut General Assembly of the Colony of Connecticut from Norwalk; October 1673; With: John Bowton	Succeeded by John Gregory; John Bowton
Preceded by John Gregory; John Bowton	Deputy of the Connecticut General Assembly of the Colony of Connecticut from Norwalk; October 1674; With: Daniel Kellogg	Succeeded by John Gregory; Thomas Benedict; John Bowton
Preceded by Daniel Kellogg	Deputy of the Connecticut General Assembly of the Colony of Connecticut from Norwalk; May 1676	Succeeded by John Bowton; Mark Sension
Preceded by John Gregory; John Bowton	Deputy of the Connecticut General Assembly of the Colony of Connecticut from Norwalk; May 1678; With: John Bowton	Succeeded by Mark Sension; John Platt
Preceded by John Gregory; John Bowton	Deputy of the Connecticut General Assembly of the Colony of Connecticut from Norwalk; October 1681; With: John Platt	Succeeded by John Bowton; John Platt
