= Richard Olmsted (settler) =

Early settler of colonial Connecticut

Deputy of the General Court of the Colony of Connecticut from Norwalk
- In office May 1653 – October 1653
- Preceded by: Office established
- Succeeded by: Norwalk not represented in October 1653 session
- In office October 1654 – May 1655
- Preceded by: Matthew Canfield, Matthew Marvin Sr.
- Succeeded by: Matthew Canfield
- In office May 1658 – October 1658 Serving with Matthew Canfield
- Preceded by: Samuel Hales, Isaac Moore
- Succeeded by: Nathaniel Richards, Walter Hoyt
- In office October 1660 – May 1661 Serving with Samuel Hales
- Preceded by: Matthew Canfield, Samuel Hales
- Succeeded by: Matthew Canfield, Walter Hoyt
- In office May 1662 – October 1662 Serving with Matthew Canfield
- Preceded by: Walter Hoyt
- Succeeded by: Matthew Canfield, John Gregory
- In office May 1663 – May 1665 Serving with Matthew Canfield, John Gregory
- Preceded by: Matthew Canfield, John Gregory
- Succeeded by: John Gregory
- In office October 1665 – October 1667 Serving with Matthew Canfield
- Preceded by: Matthew Canfield, John Gregory
- Succeeded by: John Gregory, Walter Hoyt
- In office May 1668 – October 1669 Serving with John Gregory, Walter Hoyt
- Preceded by: John Gregory, Walter Hoyt
- Succeeded by: John Gregory, John Douglas
- In office May 1671 – October 1671 Serving with Walter Hoyt
- Preceded by: Daniel Kellogg, John Gregory
- Succeeded by: John Gregory, John Bowton
- In office May 1679 – October 1679 Serving with John Gregory
- Preceded by: Mark Sension, John Platt
- Succeeded by: Daniel Kellogg, John Bowton

Personal details
- Born: February 20, 1612 Harwich, England
- Died: April 20, 1687 (aged 75) Norwalk, Connecticut Colony
- Resting place: East Norwalk Historical Cemetery, Norwalk, Connecticut
- Spouse(s): Frances Haugh, Magdelen Hill Smith (m. before 1670, widow of William Smith)
- Children: John Olmstead, Richard Olmstead, Rebecca Olmstead, James Olmsted

Military service
- Rank: Captain
- Battles/wars: King Philip's War, Pequot War

Richard Olmsted (February 20, 1612 – April 20, 1687) was a founding settler of both Hartford and Norwalk, Connecticut. He served in the General Court of the Connecticut Colony in the sessions of May 1653, October 1654, May 1658, October 1660, May 1662, May and October 1663, May and October 1664, October 1665, May and October 1666, May 1667, May and October 1668, May 1669, May 1671, and May 1679.

== Early life ==
Olmsted was born in Harwich, England in 1612. It has long been claimed that he came to Boston along with his uncle James Olmsted aboard the ship Lyon in 1632. He lived in Mount Wollaston, Massachusetts Bay Colony (now Quincy) originally. Richard Olmstead is in the passenger list of the Lyon which sailed from Thames, England, on June 22, 1632 and arrived at Boston, Massachusetts Bay Colony in America on September 16, 1632. He came with his Uncle James and his children Nicholas, Nehemiah, and Richard's siblings John and Rebecca.

== Settlement of Hartford ==
In 1636, he moved to Hartford, Connecticut with the congregation of Thomas Hooker, becoming one of its original settlers.

In 1637, he was a soldier in the Pequot War.

About 1646, he married Elisabeth Haugh(?). In about 1670, he married Magdelan (maiden name Crane?) Smith, widow of William Smith.

In 1646, he was a constable, and in 1649 he was a fence viewer.

== Settlement of Norwalk ==
Roger Ludlow purchased the land that would become Norwalk in 1640. Ludlow contracted with fourteen men for the original planting of Norwalk. In 1649, Olmsted, along with Nathaniel Ely became the first two settlers.

In 1653, he was Deputy of Norwalk to the General Court at Hartford.

In 1656, appointed by the General Court, Leather seller, for Norwalk.

In 1657, he was chosen Townsman in Norwalk.

On May 19, 1659, he was appointed with three others to settle a land dispute between the towns of Stratford and Fairfield, with the Indians. On May 17, 1660, he was appointed Grand Juror for Norwalk.

In 1661, he along with John Banks and Joseph Judson were appointed by the General Court to survey the town boundary between Fairfield and Stratford.

From 1676 to 1676, he served in King Philip's War, achieving the rank of Captain.

On October 4, 1660, he was appointed Deputy to the General Court at Hartford.

From 1669 to 1675, he was a Selectman in Norwalk.

He was chosen Deputy of Norwalk to the General Court a dozen times between 1660 and 1679.

In 1675, at a meeting of the Council he was appointed to sign bills for the payment of soldiers in King Philip's War.

He was Commissioner for Norwalk, with magisterial powers, from 1668 to 1677.

He is listed on the Founders Stone bearing the names of the founders of Hartford in the Ancient Burying Ground in Hartford, and he is also listed on the Founders Stone bearing the names of the founders of Norwalk in the East Norwalk Historical Cemetery.

Preceded by Office established	Deputy of the General Court of the Connecticut Colony from Norwalk; May 1653	Succeeded by Norwalk not represented in October 1653 session
Preceded by Matthew Canfield; Matthew Marvin Sr.	Deputy of the General Court of the Connecticut Colony from Norwalk; October 1654	Succeeded by Matthew Canfield
Preceded by Samuel Hales; Isaac Moore	Deputy of the General Court of the Connecticut Colony from Norwalk; May 1658; With: Matthew Canfield	Succeeded by Nathaniel Richards; Walter Hoyt
Preceded by Matthew Canfield; Samuel Hales	Deputy of the General Court of the Connecticut Colony from Norwalk; October 1660; With: Samuel Hales	Succeeded by Matthew Canfield; Walter Hoyt
Preceded by Walter Hoyt	Deputy of the General Court of the Connecticut Colony from Norwalk; May 1662; With: Matthew Canfield	Succeeded by Matthew Canfield; John Gregory
Preceded by Matthew Canfield; John Gregory	Deputy of the General Assembly of the Connecticut Colony from Norwalk; May 1663, October 1663, May 1664, October 1664; With: John Gregory, Matthew Canfield	Succeeded by John Gregory
Preceded by John Gregory; Matthew Canfield	Deputy of the General Assembly of the Connecticut Colony from Norwalk; October 1665, May 1666, October 1666, May 1667; With: Matthew Canfield	Succeeded by Walter Hoyt; John Gregory
Preceded by Walter Hoyt; John Gregory	Deputy of the General Assembly of the Connecticut Colony from Norwalk; May 1668, October 1668, May 1669; With: John Gregory, Walter Hoyt	Succeeded by John Gregory; John Douglas
Preceded by Daniel Kellogg; John Gregory	Deputy of the General Assembly of the Connecticut Colony from Norwalk; May 1671; With: Walter Hoyt	Succeeded by John Gregory; John Bowton
Preceded by Mark Sension; John Platt	Deputy of the General Assembly of the Connecticut Colony from Norwalk; May 1679; With: John Gregory	Succeeded by Daniel Kellogg; John Bowton
