= Ely (surname) =

Ely is a surname which may refer to:

- Alfred Ely (1815–1892), American politician
- Arthur V. Ely (1912–1942), United States Navy officer and Navy Cross recipient
- Ben Ely (born 1970), Australian musician
- Bill Ely (1869–1957), Australian politician
- Bob Ely (born 1958), American entrepreneur, former investment banker and 2012 presidential candidate
- Dudley Ely (1817–1895), first mayor of South Norwalk, Connecticut
- Eugene Burton Ely (1886–1911), American aviation pioneer
- Frederick D. Ely (1838–1921), American politician
- Harold Ely (1909–1983), American football player
- Harry Ely (1854–1928), American football and baseball coach
- Harry Ely (baseball) (1868–1925), American baseball player
- Helena Rutherfurd Ely (1858–1920), American author, amateur gardener and founding member of the Garden Club of America
- Jack Ely (1943–2015), American guitarist and singer, best known for singing the Kingsmen's version of "Louie Louie"
- Janet Ely (born 1953), American diver
- Joe Ely (1947–2025), American singer, songwriter and guitarist
- John Ely (disambiguation)
- John Hart Ely (1938–2003), American legal scholar
- Joseph B. Ely (1881–1956), 52nd Governor of Massachusetts
- Melvin Ely (born 1978), American basketball player
- Michael Ely, author
- Nathaniel Ely (1605–1675), founding settler of Hartford and Norwalk, Connecticut
- Ralph Ely (1820–1883), American politician and military officer from Michigan
- Reginald Ely (fl. 1438–1471), English architect
- Richard T. Ely (1854–1943), American economist
- Richard Ely (1945–2019), American actor, singer and voice actor
- Rodrigo Ely (born 1993), Brazilian-Italian footballer
- Ron Ely (1938–2024), stage name of American actor Ronald Pierce
- Shyra Ely (born 1983), American former Women's National Basketball Association player
- Smith Ely Jr. (1825–1911), New York City mayor and member of the United States House of Representatives
- Sumner Ely (1787–1857), New York politician
- Talfourd Ely (1838–1923), English archaeologist and classicist
- Theodore N. Ely (1846–1916), American businessman
- Thomas C. Ely (1951–2025), American bishop
- Townsend A. Ely (1843–1928), American politician from Michigan
- Victoria Joyce Ely (1889–1979), American nurse
- William Ely (disambiguation)

== See also ==
- Saint Ermenilda of Ely, daughter of King Eorcenberht of Kent and Saint Seaxburh of Ely.
- Nicholas of Ely, Lord Chancellor of England, Bishop of Worcester, Bishop of Winchester, and Lord High Treasurer in the 13th century
- Saint Seaxburh of Ely, Anglo-Saxon princess, abbess and saint
