= Isaac Moore (settler) =

Connecticut settler (c.1622–c.1705)

Deputy of the General Court of the Colony of Connecticut from Norwalk
- In office October 1657 – May 1658
- Preceded by: Matthew Canfield
- Succeeded by: Richard Olmsted

Personal details
- Born: c. 1622 England
- Died: about 1705 Farmington, Connecticut Colony
- Spouse(s): Ruth Stanley (m. December 5, 1645, Hartford), Dorothy Smith
- Children: Elizabeth Moore, Ruth Moore, Sarah Moore, Mary Moore, Phoebe Moore
- Occupation: Deacon

Isaac Moore (also Isacke More) (c. 1622 – about 1705) was a founding settler of Norwalk, Connecticut. He served as a deputy of the General Court of the Connecticut Colony from Norwalk in the October 1657 session.

He was born in England, about 1622. He came to America aboard the Increase along with Matthew Marvin, Sr. in 1635.

In 1651, he is listed among the "Runckingheage" deed settlers in Norwalk.

In 1660, Isaac and Ruth left Norwalk to settle in Farmington. In the years between 1665 and 1698, he served on the County Court jury many times. In 1682, he was appointed constable. In 1687, he was appointed surveyor of highways.

He is listed on the Founders Stone bearing the names of the founding settlers of Norwalk in the East Norwalk Historical Cemetery.

He was recently "discovered" as a Founder of Hartford, CT due to current research, although he is not on the monument.

Preceded by Matthew Canfield	Deputy of the General Court of the Colony of Connecticut from Norwalk; October 1657–May 1658	Succeeded by Richard Olmsted
