= History of Norwalk, Connecticut =

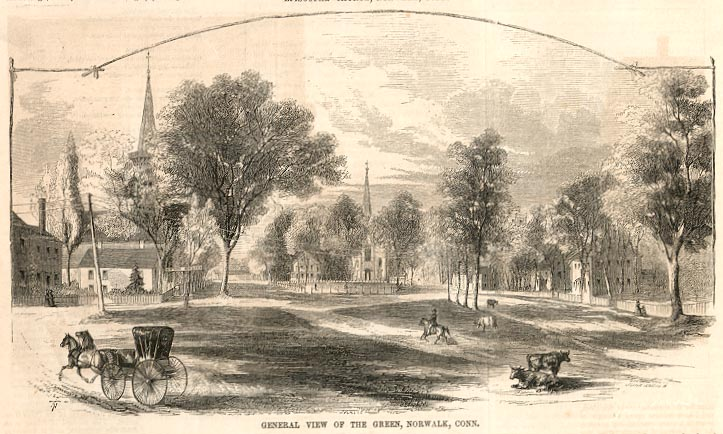
"General view of the Green, Norwalk, Conn." published in 1855 by Ballou's Pictorial

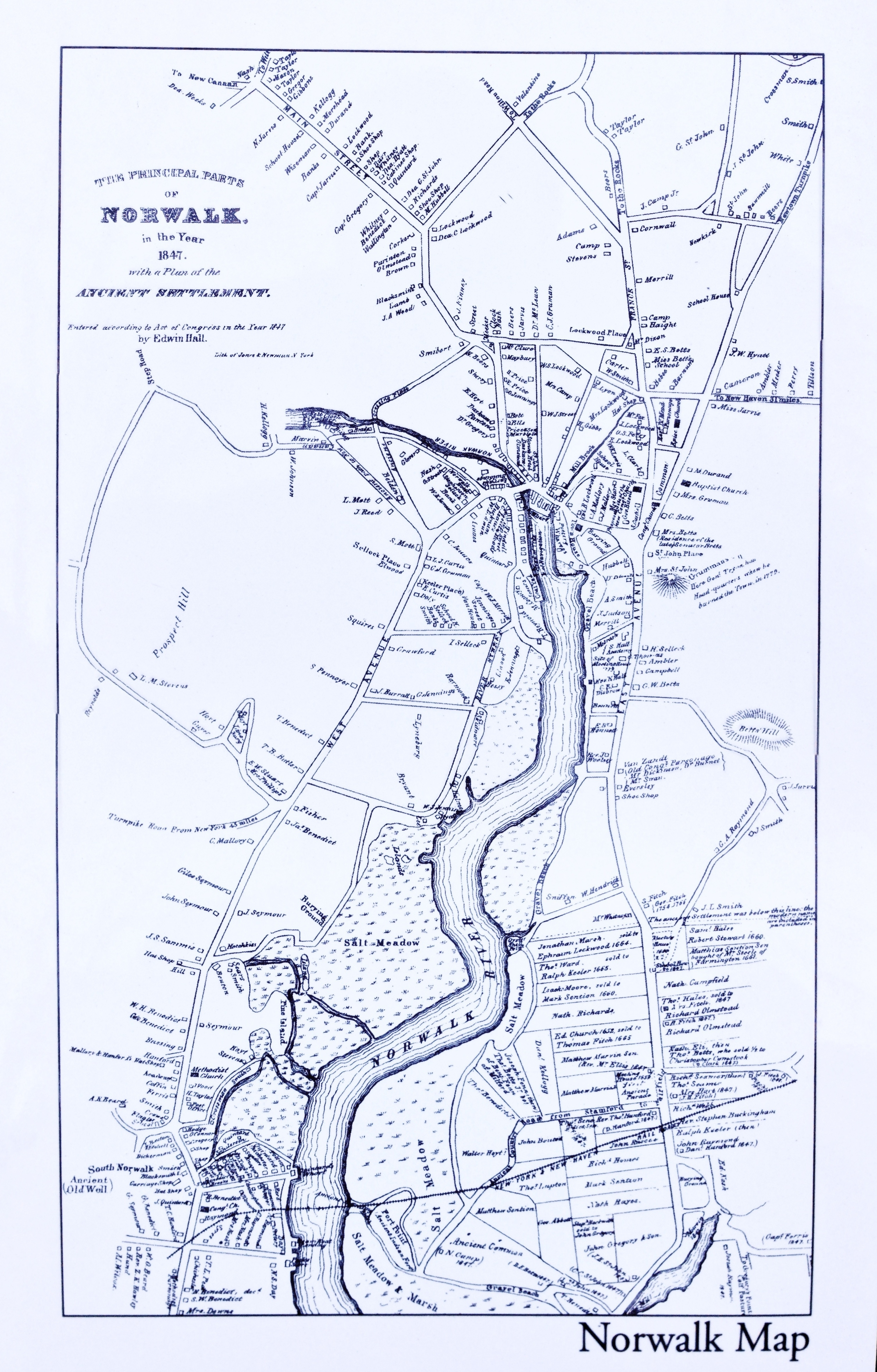
1847 Map of Norwalk

The history of Norwalk, Connecticut ranges from pre-contact cultures and Native Americans to the 21st century.

== Population ==
Census History

Year	Pop.	±%
1790	11,942	—
1800	5,146	−56.9%
1810	2,983	−42.0%
1820	3,004	+0.7%
1830	3,792	+26.2%
1840	3,863	+1.9%
1850	4,651	+20.4%
1860	7,582	+63.0%
1870	12,119	+59.8%

Year	Pop.	±%
1880	13,956	+15.2%
1890	17,747	+27.2%
1900	19,932	+12.3%
1910	24,211	+21.5%
1920	27,743	+14.6%
1930	36,019	+29.8%
1940	39,849	+10.6%
1950	49,460	+24.1%
1960	67,775	+37.0%

Year	Pop.	±%
1970	79,288	+17.0%
1980	77,767	−1.9%
1990	78,331	+0.7%
2000	82,951	+5.9%
2010	85,603	+3.2%
2015	88,485	+3.4%
2020	91,184	+3.1%

== Pre-Contact ==
During an era when Europeans had discovered the New World, Native Americans had unquestionably inhabited the area later recorded in history as Norwalk, Connecticut. Even before then many, but not all, such cultures of indigenous people came, dwelled, hunted wild animals for food, and left the area sporadically through time. Artifacts, discarded and left behind now identified by archaeologists as being consistent with cultures as far back as the earliest known peoples of North America. Known in modern time as the Paleoindian Period, sites consistent with these eras have been found in three areas of modern-day Norwalk, Connecticut. Some of these artifacts were used by hunter-gatherers roughly 5,000 B.P. to 10,200 B.P.

=== Bitter rock shelter ===
According to an article published in Bulletin of the Massachusetts Archaeological Society one such site, an ancient rock shelter presently named Bitter Rock, with undisturbed aboriginal material, was discovered, excavated and its artifacts cataloged. Today that site remains in an area of Norwalk, once known in contemporary history as Winnupuck Village on private property near to Ward Street (formerly Stickey Plain Road).

=== Spruce swamp pond ===
First occupied by Amerinds (Indigenous peoples of the Americas) about 3000 B.P. Artifacts such as projectile points found there indicate that the earliest residents of this site were primarily hunters. Later dwellers eventually added shellfish to their diet. After Long Island Sound moved inland, Spruce Swamp became infused with salt-water, and apparently, the site was abandoned at some time between 1000 B.C. and 1500 A.D. In the layers of the midden, two unique objects - a decorated paintstone[?], which may have depicted an astronomical phenomenon or have been a plan of the original village, and the skull of an adult male, bearing healed scars that seem to indicate a hole drilled, incised or scraped into the skull using simple surgical tools while the recipient remains alive... may provide important clues to the origins of these people." Now only a small half-acre salt water pond located at the southwest corner of Taylor Farm park remains as Spruce swamp had been almost 7 acres until it was destroyed "...by the construction of Calf Pasture Drive in the 1930s through the middle of the swamp and the subsequent dredging of the western portion in 1958 to create a boat basin." Despite the destruction it remains a documented archaeological site with artifacts left behind such as arrow points, pottery and bone fragments by a succession of cultures.

=== Sasqua Hill ===
The third site, Sasqua Hill, about one mile northeast of Spruce Swamp, was occupied for several thousand years. It was first recognized and excavated in 1962 as a "midden and campsite area with burials" and estimated that the site comprised an area about 10,500 feet in length. Then, a few years later it was again excavated in 1965. If any of the site, currently a residential subdivision in Norwalk remains, likely it has been destroyed by such development.

=== Additional find ===
"An approximately 3,000-year-old pot crafted by native-Americans and unearthed in Norwalk many years ago is evidence of that history." Local history buffs have Norwalk resident John Stumpf Sr. to thank for saving the pot. Mr. Stumpf said it was discovered along East Rocks Road and brought to a [unnamed] curio shop owned by Bill Murphy. Mr. Stumpf acquired the pot from Mr. Murphy and eventually donated it to The Norwalk Museum.

== 17th century ==
"Norwalk, with reference to the matter of settlement, appears first upon the page of history in A. D., 1640. In his passage through Long Island Sound in 1614, on his way to establish Hartford on the Connecticut River, Adrian Block, a Dutch navigator, had sighted from his bark's [ Barque ] deck, the Norwalk Uplands, Coast Lands and Islands, denominating the latter "The Archipelago". Adrian Block named the area New Netherland, and was commissioned by the Dutch to trade exclusively for 3 years from October 11, 1614, as the New Netherland Company. Higginson relates that in 1638 Edward Hopkins, William Goodwin and himself, three important Connecticut Colonists, held, in or near, "Narwoke" a successful parley with its aboriginal owners."

=== Purchase ===
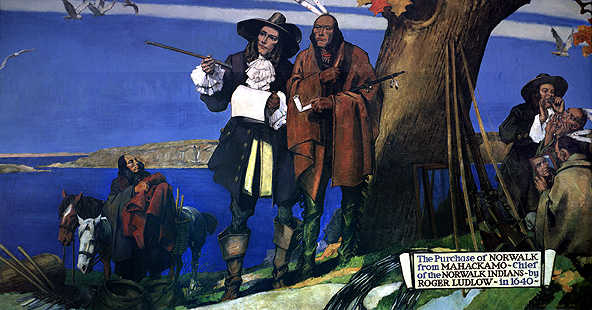
Purchase of Norwalk by Harry Townsend, WPA mural

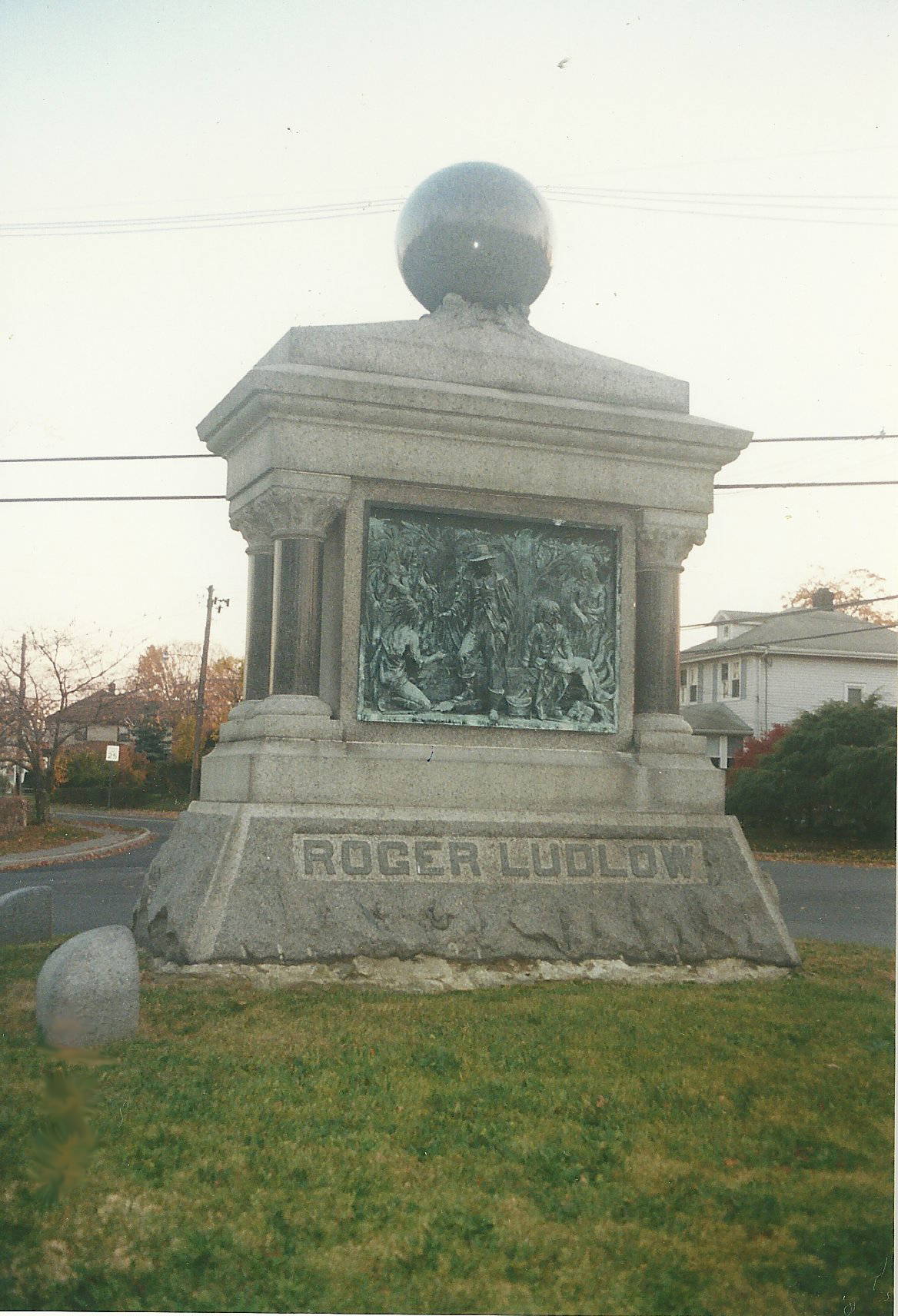
Roger Ludlow Monument in East Norwalk

Norwalk was purchased in two separate transactions in 1640 and 1641 by Daniel Patrick and Roger Ludlow. Patrick purchased areas west of the Norwalk River and east of the Five Mile River (present-day South Norwalk, Rowayton, and West Norwalk) on April 20, 1640. Ludlow purchased areas east of the Norwalk River (present-day East Norwalk and Saugatuck) on February 26, 1641, according to the Gregorian calendar; or February 26, 1640, on the then still commonly used Julian calendar. The later purchase by Ludlow is misleadingly depicted in Norwalk founding memorabilia (such as the WPA painting shown) as having occurred in the year 1640.

Patrick had traveled to Connecticut from Massachusetts and had participated in the Pequot War during 1637 and 1638. On April 20, 1640, Patrick purchased from the Indians of Norwake and Makentouh:

It was also noted that Patrick may have been purchasing the land with the goal of expanding the New Haven Colony which at the time was distinct from the Connecticut Colony.

The areas east of the Norwalk river were then purchased in 1641 (still commonly cited as having taken place in 1640) by Roger Ludlow from Chief Mahackemo of the Norwalke Indians (actually the residents of Norwauke village of the Siwanoy subdivision or "sanchemship" of the Algonquian language family).

=== Regarding Native Americans from what is now Norwalk ===
"These were scattered remnants of tribes, as the relics of the Old Field near the almshouse testify, being of diverse kinds, and the modes of burial in the graves discovered are different. Evidently hungry Indians had come to Norwalk as wanderers from their original country. There was a village of a clan of Mohegans at Belden's or Wilson's Point, however, one of the independent villages which George Bancroft (American historian and statesman) tells us were scattered between the Hudson and Connecticut rivers. It was then called Naramake, after a great chieftain, and Norwalk is a name derived from the same root-word, instead of being a punning contraction of Northwalk, which is a general impression. The late William S. Bouton, a local antiquarian, distinctly traced the site of this village twenty years ago, near the present residence of Mr. Burchard. Nearby was a feasting ground marked by a deposit two feet deep of shells and animals' bones where the Indians used to have what we call Rhode Island clambakes. Naramake was the home of Mahackemo and the others who signed the deeds which Roger Ludlow and Daniel Partrick secured from the Indians."

"Indian remains have not, to any considerable extent, been discovered within the area of middle Norwalk. There were Mohegan burying-grounds at Belden Point, Barren Marsh bank, Indian Field and Saugatuck, but none, probably, of pretence, elsewhere. It seems surprising that with the Indian's innate appreciation of the bold and striking, that such a spot, for instance, as the Norwalk Rocks should not have been appropriated for the burial of their braves. There is, however, no reason for believing, that this eminence was so used."

In or around August 2018, in connection with a state DOT rail-bridge replacement, a $1 million archaeological excavation unearthed a centuries-old Native American fort filled with several thousand artifacts. Archaeologists believe the site will change our understanding of history on both a global and a local level. The artifacts give insight to the international trade going on at the time, as well as the daily habits of Norwalk Indians.

=== Settlement ===
[In] 1659 The first Meeting House was built at the [present day] corner of East Ave. and Fort Point St. [Formally the corner of Towne Street and Ancient Country Road from Stamford to Fairfield] This building was the place where the people of Norwalk worshiped on Sundays and where the men of the town gathered to discuss the business of the town. The building was probably made of logs and was the dimensions were 30 feet long and 18 feet wide. This building did not have a bell. The men were called to meetings by beating the drum. Inside the building were bare benches with no backs. The building had no heat.

The Founder's Stone Monument [a.k.a. Founding Monument], which was formerly on the corner of Towne Street and Ancient Country Road from Stamford to Fairfield, now East Avenue and Fitch Street. Now located on East Ave near the driveway of the westbound side of the [East Norwalk] railroad station.

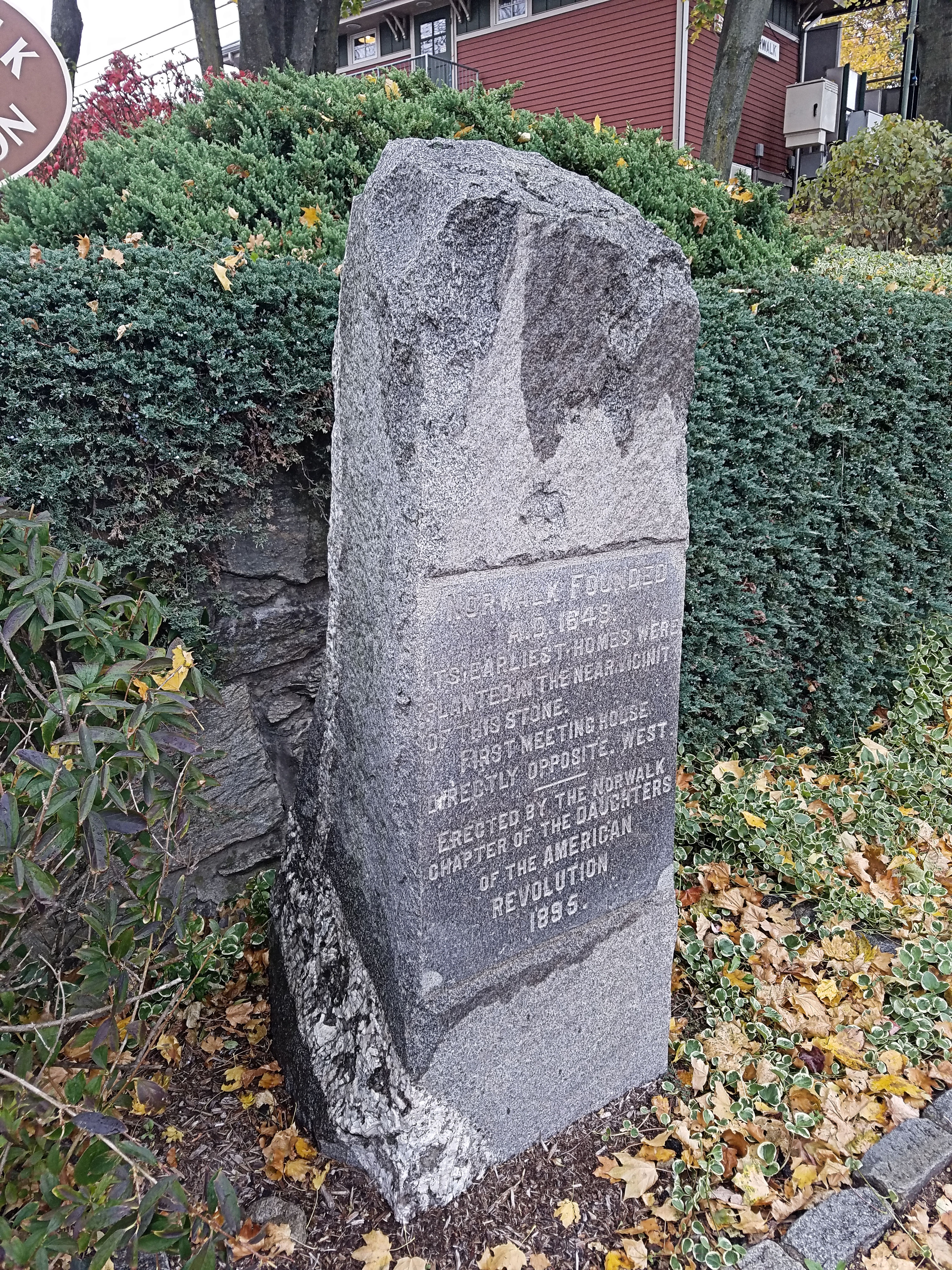
Founders/Founding Stone Monument

At its former location it marked the earliest Norwalk settlement and adjacent first Meeting House (seat of government). Inscribed on the monument: "Norwalk founded A.D. 1649. Its earliest homes were planted in the near vicinity of this stone. First meeting house directly opposite west. Erected by the Norwalk chapter of the Daughters of the American Revolution 1895."

The initial settlement had its first Congregational church by 1652. Its first minister was Thomas Hanford (1621–1693).

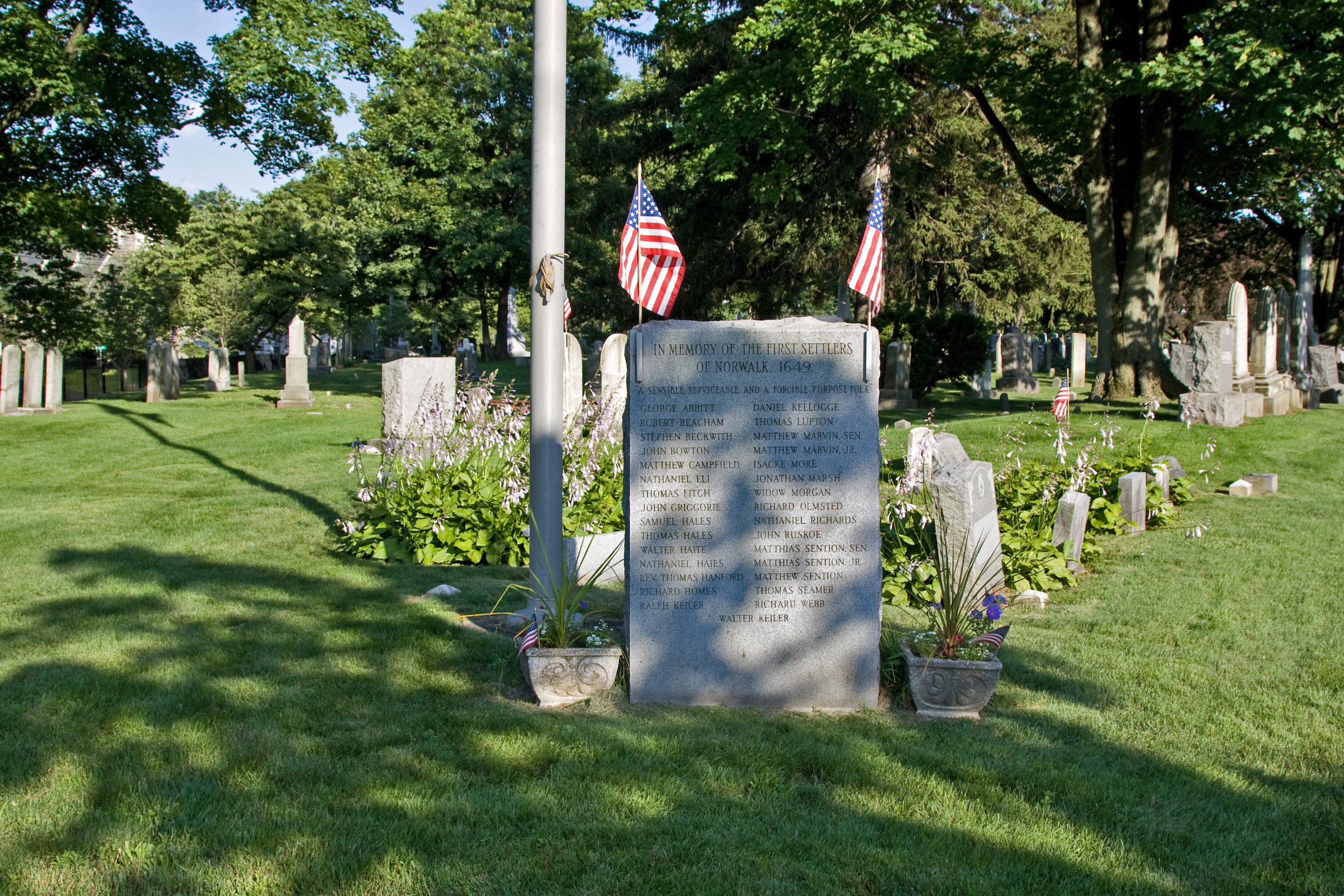
First Settlers Monument

The two first settlers, Richard Olmsted and Nathaniel Ely, arrived from Hartford in 1649. They were followed by fourteen others. Norwalk was incorporated on September 11, 1651, when the General Court of the Connecticut Colony decreed that "Norwaukee shall bee a townee". Those listed on the First Settlers Monument in the East Norwalk Historical Cemetery included: George Abbitt, Robert Beacham, Stephen Beckwith, John Bowton, Matthew Campfield, Nathaniel Eli, Thomas Fitch, John Griggorie, Samuel Hales, Thomas Hales, Walter Haite, Nathaniel Haies, Rev. Thomas Hanford, Richard Homes, Ralph Keiler, Walter Keiler, Daniel Kellogge, Thomas Lupton, Matthew Marvin Sr., Matthew Marvin Jr., Isacke More, Jonathan Marsh, Widow Morgan, Richard Olmsted, Nathaniel Richards, John Ruskoe, Matthias Sention Sr., Matthias Sention Jr., Thomas Seamer, and Richard Webb.

The settlers engaged in agricultural pursuits. The first major planted crop was corn which was soon followed by wheat, rye, oats, and barley. Community plots were located where the Pine Hill Road area is today. Cows were raised for dairy products, and Calf Pasture Beach was first used for pasturage as early as the 1650s. Eventually flax and hemp were grown for the local production of linen and rope. Flax production increased notably, and by the early 18th century was being exported to the British Isles to provide the town with a modest export economy. The present day Flax Hill Road between South Norwalk and Rowayton is a vestige of that important early crop.

== 18th century ==
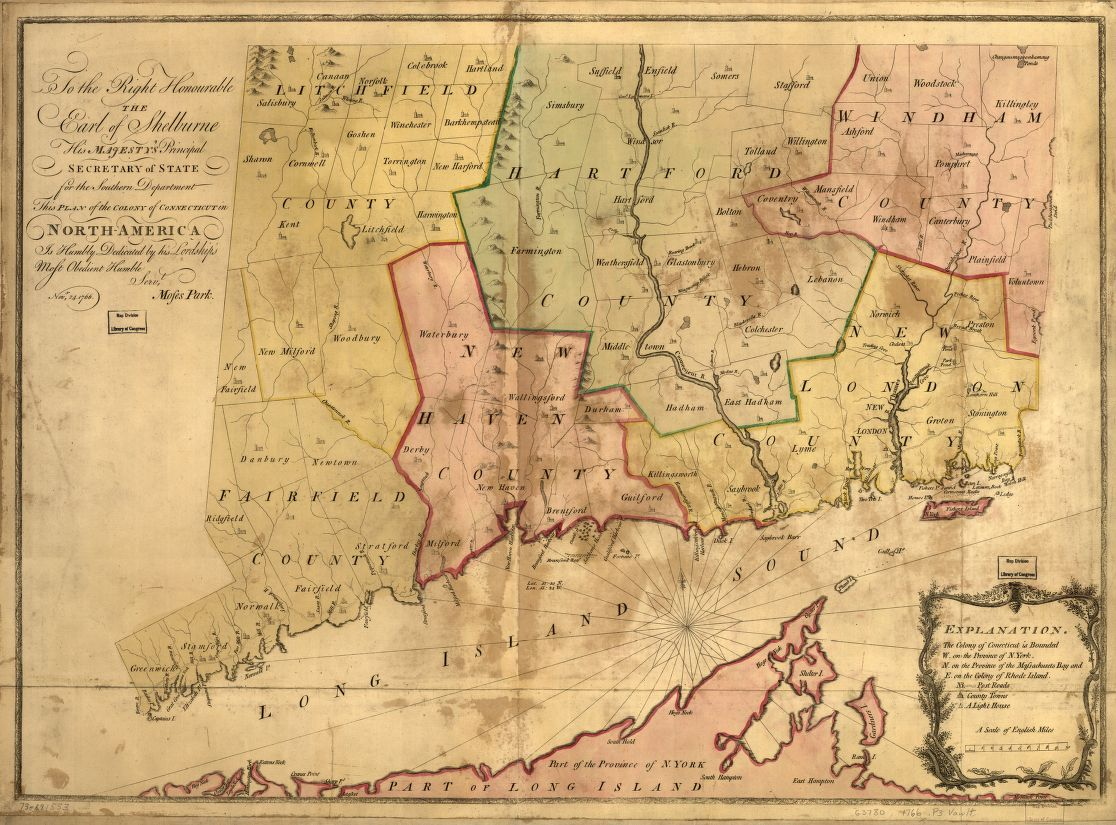
1766 Connecticut Map with Former Norwalk Borders

St. Paul's Parish, an Episcopal church was incorporated in 1737. It became St. Paul's on the Green.

=== A Maryland Physician's Travel Diary ===
Alexander Hamilton wrote in his 1744 travel diary, Itinerarium, about Norwalk:

WITHIN three miles and a half of Norwalk is another river, called by the Indian name of Sagatick. This I forded at low tide. I dined at one Taylor's [*] here.

I ARRIVED at Norwalk at seven o'clock at night. This town is situated in a bottom, midst a grove of trees. You see the steeple shoot up among the trees about half a mile before you enter the town and before you can see any of the houses.

While I was at Taylor's the children were frightened at my negro. Slaves are not so much in use as with us, their servants being chiefly bound or indentured Indians. The child asked if that negro was a-coming to eat them up. Dromo indeed wore a voracious phiz, for, having rid twenty miles without eating, he grinned like a crocodile, and showed his teeth most hideously.

Betwixt Taylor's and Norwalk, I met a caravan of eighteen or twenty Indians. I put up at Norwalk at one Beelding's, [ John Belding **] and as my boy was taking off the saddles, I could see one half of the town standing about him, making inquiry about his master.

[ * ] The eighteenth-century village (Now a part of Westport, Connecticut) encompassed by the district was first known as Taylortown for the many members of that family who settled there. One early site remains that is identified with this family: the 1730 house built by John Taylor in the center of the district at 1 Old Hill Road. Seth Taylor established the drill ground for the local militia near the end of the French and Indian War, which remained in use until after the Mexican War. Daniel Freelove Nash, a member of another family prominent in the district throughout its history, built his house about 1736 (41 Kings Highway North). It is said that it once served as a public house, or tavern.

[ ** ] "The Beldens were hospitable people entertaining many visitors from the surrounding towns in a generous fashion."

=== Yankee Doodle ===
Connecticut's state song, Yankee Doodle, has Norwalk-related origins. During the French and Indian War, a regiment of Norwalkers was assembled to report as an attachment to British regulars. The group was commanded by Col. Thomas Fitch of Norwalk (son of Connecticut governor Thomas Fitch). Assembling at Fitch's yard in Norwalk, Fitch's younger sister Elizabeth, along with other young local women who had come to bid them farewell, were distraught at the men's lack of uniforms and so they improvised plumes from chicken feathers which they gave to the men for their hats.

As they arrived at Fort Crailo, New York, the British regulars began to mock and ridicule the rag-tag Connecticut troops who only had chicken feathers for uniform. Dr. Richard Shuckburgh, a British army surgeon, added new words to a popular tune of the time, Lucy Locket (i.e., "stuck a feather in his cap and called it macaroni", macaroni being the London slang at the time for a foppish dandy).

The modern-day bridge in which I-95 crosses the Norwalk River in Norwalk is named the Yankee Doodle Bridge. Half of the bridge was closed briefly for repairs near Labor Day in 1984. After the revolution Col. Thomas Fitch V served as a Norwalk Town Councilman and assisted with the reconstruction of the town after the burning. He was buried in the East Norwalk Historical Cemetery.

=== Revolutionary War ===
In 1776, American spy Nathan Hale set out from Norwalk by ship (the converted whaleboat Schuyler) toward Huntington, New York, on his ill-fated intelligence-gathering mission.

"On April 25, 1777, Major General William Tryon's forces landed on what is now Westport's Compo Beach. As the British marched to Danbury the Patriots mustered their forces under the command of Major Gen. David Wooster and Brigadier Generals Benedict Arnold and Gold Selleck Silliman."

Norwalkers carried out one of the war's more spectacular escapades in November 1778. A flotilla of twenty whaleboats from Norwalk skipped past British warships anchored in Huntington Bay and stealthily discharged its passengers. The raiders made straight for The Cedars, a public inn kept by "Mother Chid," well known for harboring Connecticut Tories. Sixteen Tories were taken prisoner and several were killed before the raiders departed.

In 1779 British forces sought to disrupt American naval activity in Long Island Sound. General William Tryon was ordered to cripple the seaports of New Haven, Fairfield, and Norwalk. New Haven was raided on July 5, Fairfield was raided on the 7th and in retribution for resistance by the townspeople, completely burned. Residents of Norwalk, certain of what lay ahead, began to make provisions for the defense of their town, mostly by huddling up in the upper hills of the city known as "The Rocks."

[note:] From an 1893 U.S. Geological Survey map, The Rocks can be described presently as an area being roughly bordered by Bayne St. to the north, East Rocks Road to the east, Cannon Street through Ward Street and Main Street to the west. (Ward Street formerly named 'Stickey Plain Road' ) Additionally, an 1867 Beers, Ellis & Soule map "Plan of Norwalk, Plan of South Norwalk, Connecticut" illustrates three rock formations in an area surrounded by modern-day Jarvis St. through to Union Avenue, Adams Avenue and West Rocks Road. A fourth rock formation is illustrated to the northwest of Jarvis Street.

On July 9, 1779 Brigadier General Samuel Holden Parsons, of the Continental Army, was in Redding, Connecticut, where he had been sent by Commander-in Chief George Washington to assess the situation and take charge of the militia in case of further raids, as Washington and General Oliver Wolcott felt that Norwalk would be the next target of the British. Parsons also urgently appealed to Brigadier General John Glover of the Continental Army to bring his brigade to Norwalk from where he was camped in New London, Connecticut.

The Battle of Norwalk was part a series of skirmishes between the Thirteen Colonies and Great Britain during the American Revolutionary War. 70th (Surrey) Regiment of Foot of Great Britain commanded by Major General William Tryon arrived on July 10, 1779. The attack was one part of a series of raids on coastal Connecticut towns collectively known as Tryon's raid.

After the Revolutionary War, many residents were compensated for their losses with free land grants in the Connecticut Western Reserve in what is now Ohio; this later became Norwalk, Ohio.

=== Methodist evangelism ===
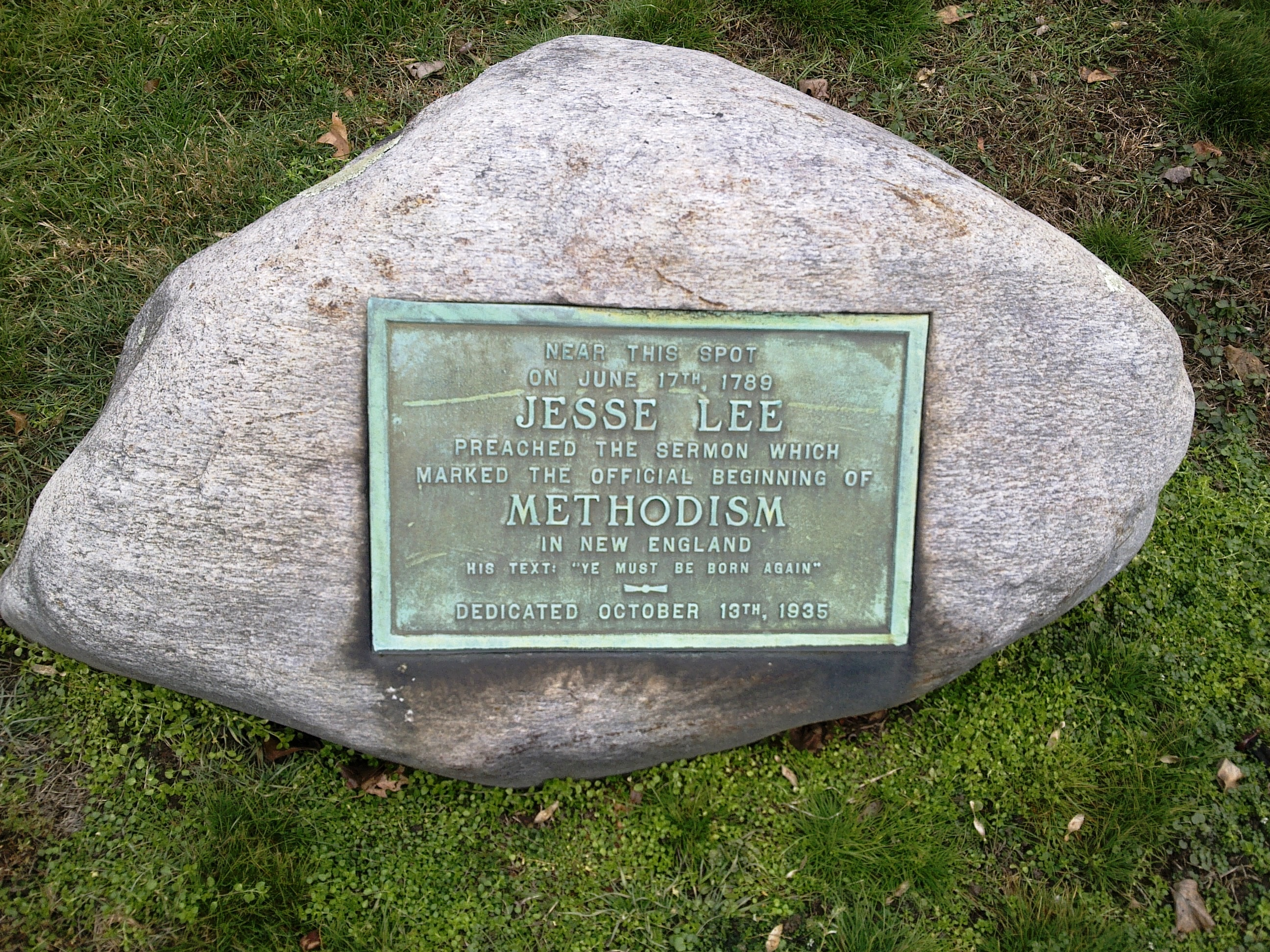
Jesse Lee Monument

Cornelius Cook delivered the first Methodist sermon in Norwalk near the New Canaan parish line in 1787. Jesse Lee the Methodist preacher who was so successful at establishing his sect in New England that he was given the nickname "The Apostle of Methodism" first preached in New England at Norwalk on June 17, 1789. He asked a local resident if she would allow him to preach in her home and was refused. She also refused him the use of a nearby empty house her husband owned, so Lee preached under an apple tree. Lee was a circuit rider who preached at numerous locations around New England. On his next visit to Norwalk, he was allowed to preach at the "town-house". Lee eventually served as chaplain to Congress for six terms. A bronze plaque on a rock marks the approximate place where Lee's original sermon took place under the apple tree in 1789 and is in a traffic island at the intersection of U.S. 1 and Main Avenue in Central Norwalk.

== 19th century ==
Sheffield Island Light:

In 1826, agents of the U.S. Treasury Department (which was in charge of lighthouses at that time), after surveying various sites in the Norwalk Islands, decided that the western end of Sheffield Island was the most suitable spot for a light to mark Norwalk Harbor.

. . .

With the end of the Civil War, shipping traffic in the harbor increased, and in 1867 Congress appropriated funds to build a new lighthouse and keeper's quarters.

. . .

The new structure was two-and-a-half stories tall and built out of granite blocks. At the front end of the roof, a cast-iron lantern tower rose to forty-six feet. A fourth-order Fresnel lens, which produced alternating red and white flashes and was installed in the old tower in 1858, was moved to the new lighthouse.

In 1836 the central area around Wall Street and the Green was incorporated as the Borough of Norwalk with an area slightly smaller than the present day First taxing district.

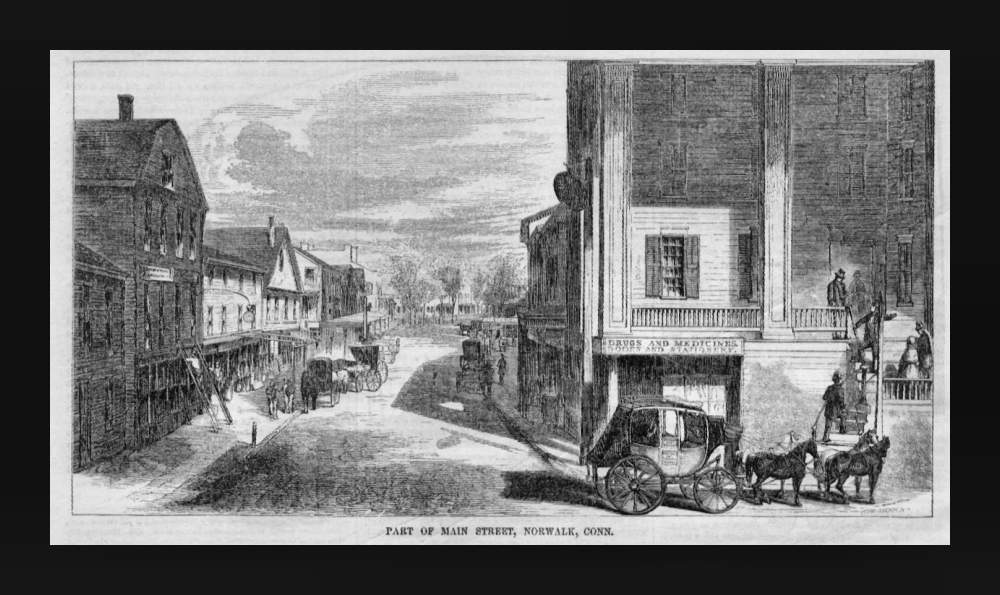
"Part of Main Street", 1855 engraving in Baillou's Pictorial

In January 1849 the New York and New Haven Railroad began operating between its nominal terminal cities through Norwalk. In 1852 the Danbury and Norwalk Railroad connected Norwalk with Danbury. The South Norwalk station was used by both railroads. The first major U.S. railroad bridge disaster occurred in Norwalk in 1853. The engineer, Edward Tucker, carelessly neglected to check the open drawbridge signal as his one hundred and fifty passenger train approached the Norwalk River.

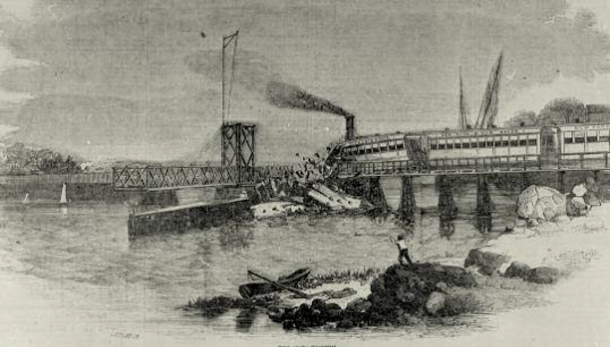
May 6, 1853, Illustrated News

He only realized the bridge was up within about four hundred feet of the gap, which proved to be insufficient to stop the train. The engineer and the fireman jumped from the train and then the locomotive, two baggage cars (the latter also a car for smokers) and two and a half passenger cars (the third car split when the train finally came to a stop) went plunging off the tracks into the river. Forty-six people drowned or were crushed to death, and an approximately thirty people were more or less severely injured. Tucker, who survived, never overcame his feelings of guilt, and five years later committed suicide. By 1872 the NY&NE merged with the Hartford and New Haven Railroad to form the New York, New Haven and Hartford Railroad which lasted until its merger with Penn Central in 1969. The Housatonic Railroad leased the D&N in 1887. The Housatonic was then purchased by the NYNH&H in 1892 and the D&N became the Danbury Branch of that railroad.

Norwalk is reputed to have been one of the stops on the northward land route of the Underground Railroad. Several trunk lines emanated from New York City, a central point in the escape route, which one passing through Greenwich, Darien, Norwalk, and Wilton. Several era-houses still standing have secret chambers or passageways that could have been used to hide runaways but no documentation exists that identifies one particular house or even one area. However, tradition states that a house at 69 East Avenue was Norwalk's stop on the Railroad.

== Oyster Cultivation ==
"Oyster culture has been a leading industry of the town since the friendly Indians showed the first settlers the natural beds off the Norwalk shores. A Norwalk oysterman, Captain Peter Decker, was the first in the industry to introduce steam power in oyster dredging (1874).

The first attempt to use steam power for oyster dredging of which we have any knowledge was made at Norwalk Conn when a boiler and engine were put on board the sloop Early Bird in 1874 for the purpose only of turning the drums with which the dredge lines were hauled. Later this vessel was further improved by the addition of a propeller and this was found to add so materially to her effectiveness that since that time several screw steamers have been built expressly for this work. They are generally of small size ranging from 20 to 53 tons from 50 to 83 feet in length with a beam of 12 to 20 feet.

Although eventually overfishing pushed Norwalk's industry into a decline, a renaissance has been occurring since the later part of the last century, although eastern oyster diseases Dermo and MSX remain a problem for the industry.

In 1871 the area formerly known as Old Well was chartered by the state legislature as the City of South Norwalk. In 1893 the Borough of Norwalk was reincorporated as the City of Norwalk and at that time both cities were wholly within and subject to jurisdiction by the Town of Norwalk.

On September 28, 1878, 15 people were killed when the steamship Adelphi exploded due to a rupture in a furnace.

== 20th century ==
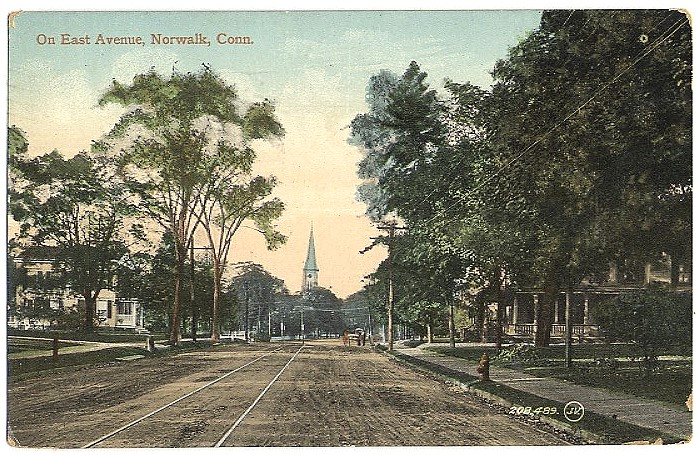
East Avenue, from a postcard sent in 1909

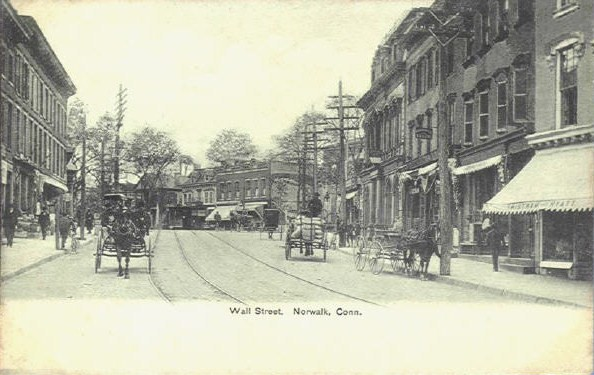
Wall Street c. 1905

In 1913, the cities of Norwalk, South Norwalk, the East Norwalk Fire District, and the remaining parts of the surrounding Town of Norwalk consolidated into the present day City of Norwalk. After consolidation the Town of Norwalk continued its existence but it is now governed by the Mayor-council government of the city.

The former city hall was built in 1912.

On May 19, 1921, the Connecticut General Assembly passed an act that split the city of Norwalk into six taxing districts with Rowayton formally joining the city as its sixth taxing district.

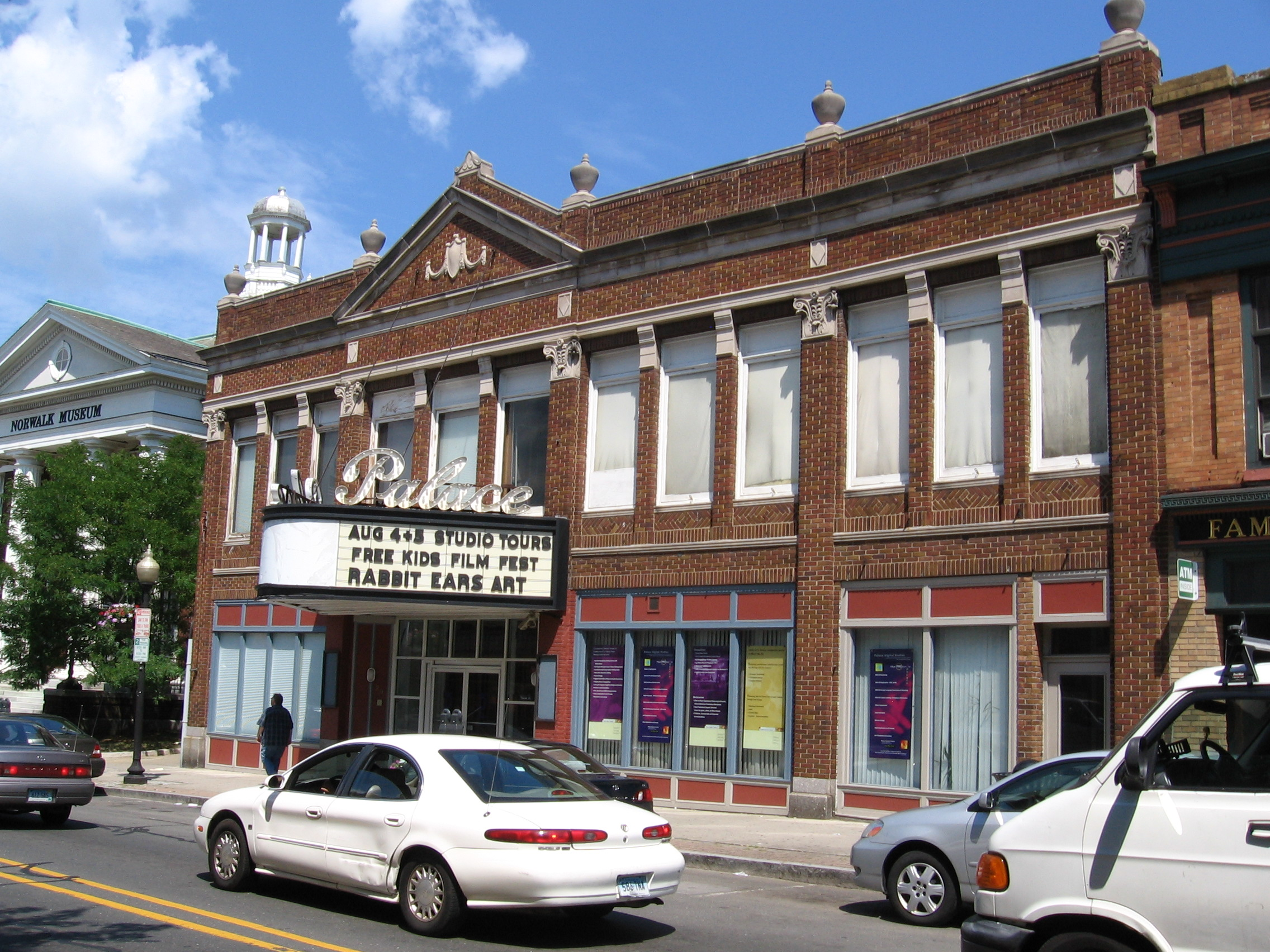
Palace Theater on Main Street in South Norwalk

The Palace Theater in South Norwalk was built by Samuel Roodner. When it opened on December 21, 1914, the Palace Theater contained 1,149 seats.

Over the years, the Palace Theater hosted renowned performers such as Enrico Caruso, Mae West, Harry Houdini, W.C. Fields, among others. At one time, the Palace Theater was known as "the theater you play before you play the Palace Theater in New York." Palace in New York By 1941 it was operated by Warner Bros. Circuit Management Corp.

The popular movie house closed in 1966 and remained dormant until 1975 when Russell Fratto purchased the building with plans for revitalizing it into The Palace Performing Arts Center.

The Ku Klux Klan, which preached a doctrine of Protestant control of America and suppression of blacks, Jews and Catholics, experienced a nationwide revival in the 1920s and had formed a Klavern in Norwalk by 1923. During that summer, Klan members set fire to a 30-foot-tall (9.1 m) cross on Calf Pasture Beach and painted a large "KKK" on the stone wall surrounding industrialist James A. Ferrell's Rock Ledge Estate in Rowayton. By 1926, the Klan was riven by internal divisions and became ineffective, although it continued to maintain small, local branches for years afterward in Norwalk as well as Stamford, Bridgeport, Darien and Greenwich.

Norwalk made New York Times front-page news for two months in 1954 during the wave of accusations exposing "disloyal citizens" when the Mulvoy-Tarlov-Aquino Veterans of Foreign Wars Post divulged that it was turning over to the FBI names and addresses of residents whose records or activities were deemed to be Communistic.

The disclosure was intended to attract new members to the post but it set in motion a nationwide controversy that pitted hardliners against civil libertarians. Chairman of the House Un-American Activities Committee Harold Velde (with approval from Senator Joseph McCarthy) suggested that the VFW turn over names of suspected Communists to it, as well as the FBI. On the other hand, the state branch of the Americans for Democratic Action condemned the VFW for not allowing those charged to answer the accusations, and the chairman of the American Veterans' Committee, Bill Mauldin, censured that action as "vigilante tactics which violate the spirit of Americanism." Asked at a news conference to comment on the Norwalk VFW's stand, President Dwight Eisenhower replied that no one was could be prevented from reporting suspects to the FBI and that since the VFW was not making the names public there was no basis for libel or slander.

The original story had placed the onus for sifting data and forwarding names to the FBI on a special committee allegedly formed from among post membership of men "from all walks of life." When the national VFW commander appeared before the House Veterans Committee he unequivocally stated there had been no committee, no investigation, no evaluation, and no discussion of suspects among the Norwalk Post membership. On NBC television the local commander stated the Post "never screened, never evaluated material, and never publicized it." In a radio broadcast, Suzanne Silvercruys Stevenson, founder of the Minute Women of the U.S. and a member of the Norwalk VFW Auxiliary, labeled the committee story a myth. She explained that a timid person had shared his suspicions about an individual with Communist leanings with the post commander and that when the informant was reluctant to turn in the name the post commander had done so in his behalf.

The spotlight on Norwalk was particularly embarrassing because the community was playing host to a group of newspaper men from NATO countries here under sponsorship of the State and Defense Departments to visit "a typical American town".

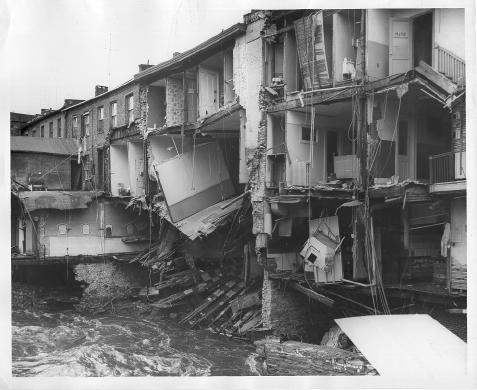
At Main and Wall streets in Central Norwalk after the October 1955 storm

Over the weekend of October 14–17, 1955, 12-14 inches of tropical storm rain caused the Norwalk River, along with many other Connecticut rivers, to severely flood from the heavy rains. Some dams along the Norwalk River broke, sending walls of water surging downstream, knocking out bridges and additional dams. Several lives were lost in addition to millions of dollars' worth of damage along the Norwalk River watershed alone. Norwalk's downtown area, located at the point the river flows into the Norwalk Harbor, was particularly devastated, and has yet to fully recover.

In the mid-1970s, under the administration Mayor William Collins, the city government and several local organizations started the South Norwalk Revitalization Project. Its goal was to preserve the historic architecture of South Norwalk ("SoNo") and revitalize the neighborhood, especially on Washington Street and several surrounding blocks. "The Washington Street National Historic District was established, and 32 buildings were placed on the National Register of Historic Places," according to the Web site for the Maritime Aquarium at Norwalk.

The government, the Norwalk Redevelopment Agency, the Junior League of Stamford-Norwalk, The Oceanic Society and the Norwalk Seaport Association all worked to start an aquarium focusing on Long Island Sound as a tourist attraction to strengthen the business climate in the neighborhood. In 1986, ground breaking ceremonies took place on the site of a former 1860s iron works factory, an abandoned brick building on the SoNo waterfront. The aquarium, originally named the Maritime Center at Norwalk, was opened in 1988 and rounded out with an IMAX movie theater and a boat collection. In 1996 the facility was renamed the Maritime Aquarium at Norwalk.

== 21st century ==
In 2002 Norwalk Superior Court was the location of the extensive media covered trial of Michael Skakel for the murder of Martha Moxley in 1975. After a four-week trial, Skakel was convicted on June 7 for the crime. On October 23, 2013, Skakel was granted a new trial by a Connecticut judge who ruled that Sakel's attorney failed to adequately represent him when he was convicted in 2002. Subsequently, On November 21, 2013, Skakel was released on a $1.2 million bond along with other conditions. In December 2016, the Connecticut Supreme Court reinstated Skakel's murder conviction with a 4–3 majority decision.

On Sunday May 25, 2008, the last service at the First United Methodist Church of Norwalk was held prior to a deconsecration ceremony that marked the end of the church use of the distinctive yellow brick building at 39 West Avenue. The Methodist congregation had been formed in 1789 during the visit by Jesse Lee, but is survived by three other Methodist churches in the city.

== See also ==
- Connecticut's 12th Senate District
- List of mayors of Norwalk, Connecticut
- List of members of the Connecticut General Assembly from Norwalk
- Lockwood-Mathews Mansion
- List of Registered Historic Places in Norwalk, CT
- Norwalk rail accident
- Mill Hill Historic Park
- Pine Island Cemetery
