= Mark Sension =

Early Connecticut settler (1630–1693)

Deputy of the Connecticut General Assembly of the Colony of Connecticut from Norwalk
- In office October 1672 – May 1673 Serving with Nicholas Hoyt
- Preceded by: Daniel Kellogg, Walter Hoyt
- Succeeded by: Thomas Fitch
- In office October 1676 – May 1677 Serving with John Bowton
- Preceded by: Walter Hoyt
- Succeeded by: Daniel Kellogg
- In office October 1678 – May 1679 Serving with John Platt
- Preceded by: Walter Hoyt, John Bowton
- Succeeded by: John Gregory
- In office May 1684 – May 1685 Serving with John Platt
- Preceded by: Daniel Kellogg, John Platt
- Succeeded by: John Bowton, John Platt

Personal details
- Born: 1630 Dorchester, Massachusetts
- Died: August 12, 1693 Darien, Connecticut
- Resting place: East Norwalk Historical Cemetery, Norwalk, Connecticut
- Spouse(s): Elizabeth Stanley, Dorothy Smith
- Children: 10

Mark Sension (also Mark St. John) (1630 – August 12, 1693) was an early settler of Norwalk, Connecticut. He was a deputy of the Connecticut General Assembly of the Colony of Connecticut from Norwalk in the sessions of October 1672, October 1676, October 1678, and May and October 1684.

Preceded by Daniel Kellogg; Walter Hoyt	Deputy of the Connecticut General Assembly of the Colony of Connecticut from Norwalk; October 1672; With: Nicholas Hoyt	Succeeded by Thomas Fitch
Preceded by Walter Hoyt	Deputy of the Connecticut General Assembly of the Colony of Connecticut from Norwalk; October 1676; With: John Bowton	Succeeded by Daniel Kellogg
Preceded by Walter Hoyt; John Bowton	Deputy of the Connecticut General Assembly of the Colony of Connecticut from Norwalk; October 1678; With: John Platt	Succeeded by Richard Olmsted; John Gregory
Preceded by Daniel Kellogg; John Platt	Deputy of the Connecticut General Assembly of the Colony of Connecticut from Norwalk; May and October 1684; With: John Platt	Succeeded by John Bowton; John Platt
