= Nathaniel Ely =

Deputy of the General Court of the Colony of Connecticut from Norwalk
- In office October 1656 – May 1657
- Preceded by: Matthew Canfield
- Succeeded by: Samuel Hales, Matthew Canfield

Personal details
- Born: 1605 Tenterden, Kent, England
- Died: December 25, 1675 (aged 69–70) Springfield, Massachusetts Bay Colony
- Resting place: Hartford, Connecticut Colony Norwalk, Connecticut Colony Chicopee, Massachusetts Bay Colony
- Spouse: Martha Ely
- Children: Samuel Ely, Ruth Ely Horton
- Occupation: Constable, tavern owner

Nathaniel Ely (also Nathaniel Eli) (1605 – December 25, 1675) was a founding settler of Hartford and Norwalk, Connecticut. He served as a deputy of the General Court of the Connecticut Colony from Norwalk in the October 1656 session.

He was born in 1605 in Tenterden, Kent, England. He was the son of the Reverend Nathaniel Ely and Susan Dowle.

He came to America, sailing from Ipswich aboard the Elizabeth, in 1634. He originally settled in Cambridge, Massachusetts Bay Colony.

== Settlement of Hartford ==
Coat of Arms of Nathaniel Ely

In June 1636, Reverend Thomas Hooker led a group of about one hundred people including Ely to Hartford. He served there as a constable in 1639, and as a selectman in 1643 and 1649.

== Settlement of Norwalk ==
Roger Ludlow purchased the land that would become Norwalk in 1640. Ludlow contracted with fourteen men for the original planting of Norwalk. In 1649, Ely and Richard Olmsted became the first two settlers. He served in the General Court of the Colony of Connecticut representing Norwalk in 1656. He lived in Norwalk until 1659.

He then moved to Springfield, Massachusetts Bay Colony. He served as a selectman there in 1661, 1663, 1666, 1668, 1671 and 1673. After 1665, he was a tavern keeper.

He is listed on the Founders Stone bearing the names of the founders of Hartford in the Ancient Burying Ground in Hartford, and he is also listed on the Founders Stone bearing the names of the founding settlers of Norwalk in the East Norwalk Historical Cemetery.

Preceded by Matthew Canfield	Deputy of the General Court of the Colony of Connecticut from Norwalk; October 1656–May 1657	Succeeded by Samuel Hales; Matthew Canfield
