= Thomas Fitch =

Thomas Fitch may refer to:

- Thomas Fitch (settler) (I) (1612–1704), founding settler of Norwalk, Connecticut
- Thomas Fitch (governor) (IV) (1699–1774), governor of the Connecticut Colony
- Thomas Fitch V (1725–1795), representative from Norwalk to the Connecticut House of Representatives, traditionally believed to be the original "Yankee Doodle Dandy"
- Thomas Fitch (politician) (1838–1923), United States Representative from Nevada
