= Daniel Kellogg (settler) =

Early settler of colonial Connecticut

Deputy of the General Court of the Colony of Connecticut from Norwalk
- In office October 1670 – May 1671 Serving with John Gregory
- Preceded by: Thomas Benedict, Walter Hoyt
- Succeeded by: Walter Hoyt, Richard Olmsted
- In office May 1672 – October 1672 Serving with Walter Hoyt
- Preceded by: John Gregory, John Bowton
- Succeeded by: Nicholas Hoyt, Mark Sension
- In office October 1674 – May 1675 Serving with Walter Hoyt
- Preceded by: John Gregory, John Bowton
- Succeeded by: John Gregory, John Bowton, Thomas Benedict
- In office October 1675 – May 1676
- Preceded by: John Gregory, John Bowton, Thomas Benedict
- Succeeded by: Walter Hoyt
- In office May 1677 – October 1677
- Preceded by: Mark Sension, John Bowton
- Succeeded by: John Gregory, John Bowton
- In office October 1679 – October 1680 Serving with John Bowton
- Preceded by: Richard Olmsted, John Gregory
- Succeeded by: John Platt, John Gregory
- In office October 1683 – May 1684 Serving with John Platt
- Preceded by: John Bowton
- Succeeded by: Mark Sension, John Platt

Personal details
- Born: February 1630 Great Leighs, Essex, England
- Died: December 1688 (aged 58) Norwalk, Connecticut Colony
- Resting place: East Norwalk Historical Cemetery, Norwalk, Connecticut
- Spouse: Bridget Bouton Kellogg (m. 1655)
- Children: John Kellogg, Joseph Kellogg, Mary Kellogg, Samuel Kellogg, Lydia Kellogg, Elizabeth Kellogg, Daniel Kellogg, Benjamin Kellogg, Sarah Kellogg Brismade Betts (m. John Betts), Rachel Kellogg

Daniel Kellogg (also Daniel Kellogge) (February 1630 – December 1688) was a founding settler of Norwalk, Connecticut. He was a deputy of the Connecticut General Assembly of the Colony of Connecticut from Norwalk in the sessions of October 1670, May 1672, October 1674, October 1675, May 1677, October 1679, May 1680, and October 1683.

He was the son of Martin Kellogg and Prudence Bird Kellogg. It is believed that he was a very tall man, perhaps even seven feet tall.

He is listed on the Founders Stone bearing the names of the founding settlers of Norwalk in the East Norwalk Historical Cemetery.

| Preceded by Thomas Benedict; Walter Hoyt | Deputy of the Connecticut General Assembly of the Colony of Connecticut from Norwalk; October 1670; With: John Gregory | Succeeded by Walter Hoyt; Richard Olmsted |
| Preceded by John Gregory; John Bowton | Deputy of the Connecticut General Assembly of the Colony of Connecticut from Norwalk; May 1672; With: Walter Hoyt | Succeeded by Nicholas Hoyt; Mark Sension |
| Preceded by John Gregory; John Bowton | Deputy of the Connecticut General Assembly of the Colony of Connecticut from Norwalk; October 1674; With: Walter Hoyt | Succeeded by John Gregory; John Bowton; Thomas Benedict |
| Preceded by John Gregory; John Bowton; Thomas Benedict | Deputy of the Connecticut General Assembly of the Colony of Connecticut from Norwalk; October 1675 | Succeeded by Walter Hoyt |
| Preceded by Mark Sension; John Bowton | Deputy of the Connecticut General Assembly of the Colony of Connecticut from Norwalk; May 1677 | Succeeded by John Gregory; John Bowton |
| Preceded by Richard Olmsted; John Gregory | Deputy of the Connecticut General Assembly of the Colony of Connecticut from Norwalk; October 1679, May 1680; With: John Bowton | Succeeded by John Platt; John Gregory |
| Preceded by John Bowton | Deputy of the Connecticut General Assembly of the Colony of Connecticut from Norwalk; October 1683; With: John Platt | Succeeded by Mark Sension; John Platt |
