= Isaac Moore =

Isaac Moore may refer to:

- Isaac Moore (footballer, born 1867)
- Isaac Moore (footballer, born 2006)
- Isaac Moore (settler)
