= Richard Webb (settler) =

Deputy of the General Court of the Colony of Connecticut from Norwalk
- In office May 1656 – October 1656
- Preceded by: Matthew Canfield
- Succeeded by: Matthew Canfield

Personal details
- Born: May 5, 1580 Warwickshire, England
- Died: July 1665 Norwalk, Connecticut Colony
- Resting place: East Norwalk Historical Cemetery, East Norwalk, Connecticut
- Spouse(s): Grace Wilson (m. May 1610), Elizabeth Gregory
- Children: Richard Webb, Jr.
- Occupation: Surveyor

Coat of Arms of Richard Webb

Richard Webb I (May 5, 1580 – July 1665) was a founding settler of Hartford and Norwalk, Connecticut. He served as a deputy of the General Court of the Connecticut Colony from Norwalk in the session of May 1656.

He came to America from England in 1626, and originally settled in Cambridge, Massachusetts. He went to Hartford in 1636, with the congregation of Thomas Hooker. His home was on the west aide of Main Street, near the present corner of Church Street. In Hartford he served as a grand-juror in 1643, as a townsman in 1649, and as a surveyor of highways in 1650.

He was one of the signers of the agreement for planting Norwalk, June 19, 1650. He moved there soon after.

He is listed on the Founders Stone bearing the names of the founders of Hartford in the Ancient Burying Ground in Hartford, and he is also listed on the Founders Stone bearing the names of the founders of Norwalk in the East Norwalk Historical Cemetery.

Some researchers cite 1629 as the year that a Richard Webb (b. 1580) and his son Richard (b. 1610) arrived in Massachusetts. In all likelihood, it was either the younger Richard that followed the Reverend Hooker in the 1636 settlement of Hartford, Conn. or the Richard Webb in the company of an Elizabeth Webb who arrived in the 1630 Winthrop Fleet. The elder Richard may have died in 1646.

Preceded by Matthew Canfield	Deputy of the General Court of the Colony of Connecticut from Norwalk; May 1656 – October 1656	Succeeded by Matthew Canfield
