= Nathaniel Richards (settler) =

Deputy of the General Court of the Colony of Connecticut from Norwalk
- In office 1658–1659
- Preceded by: Matthew Canfield
- Succeeded by: Matthew Canfield

Personal details
- Born: 1604 England
- Died: 1681 (aged 76–77) Norwalk, Connecticut Colony
- Resting place: Ancient Burying Ground, Hartford, Connecticut
- Spouse(s): a first wife, Rosamond Lindall Richards (m. March 15, 1663 or 1664)
- Occupation: Planter

Nathaniel Richards (1604–1681) was a founding settler of Hartford and Norwalk, Connecticut. He served as a deputy of the General Court of the Connecticut Colony from Norwalk in October 1658.

He came to the Massachusetts Bay Colony from England in 1632 on the Lyon. He originally settled in Cambridge in 1633, and moved to Hartford in 1636 along with Thomas Hooker and about one hundred others. His home in Hartford was near the north bank of the Little River about where the west part of Pearl Street is now.

He served as a constable in 1642 and 1650. He served as a townsman in 1645.

He was one of the signers of the agreement for the planting Norwalk June 19, 1650, and moved there in the same year. He served as a deputy of the General Court in 1658, as a selectman in 1670.

He is listed on the Founders Stone bearing the names of the founders of Hartford in the Ancient Burying Ground in Hartford, and he is also listed on the Founders Stone bearing the names of the founders of Norwalk in the East Norwalk Historical Cemetery.

Preceded by Matthew Canfield	Deputy of the General Court of the Colony of Connecticut from Norwalk; 1658	Succeeded by Matthew Canfield
