= William Ely (disambiguation) =

William Ely (1765–1817) was an American politician.

William Ely may also refer to:

- William of Ely (fl. 1196–1215), English churchman
- William Ely (divine) (fl. 1609), English divine
- Bill Ely (1869–1957), Australian politician
- William H. J. Ely (1891–1942), American jurist and politician
- William J. Ely (1911–2017), American Army general
- Bones Ely (William Frederick Ely, 1863–1952), baseball player
