= Samuel Hale (settler) =

Early settler of colonial Connecticut

Deputy of the General Court of the Colony of Connecticut from Norwalk
- In office 1656–1658
- Preceded by: Matthew Canfield
- Succeeded by: Richard Olmsted
- In office 1660–1661
- Preceded by: Matthew Canfield
- Succeeded by: Matthew Canfield

Personal details
- Born: July 1, 1615 Hertford, England
- Died: November 9, 1693 (aged 78) Wethersfield, Connecticut Colony
- Resting place: Green Cemetery, Glastonbury, Connecticut
- Spouse: Mary Smith
- Children: Samuel, Thomas, Dorothy

Military service
- Battles/wars: Pequot War

Samuel Hale (July 1, 1615 – November 9, 1693) was a founding settler of Hartford and Norwalk, Connecticut. He was a deputy of the General Court of the Colony of Connecticut from Norwalk in the sessions of 1656, 1657 and 1660.

He was born on July 1, 1615, in Watton-on-Stone, Hertford, England, the son of John Hale and Martha MNU. He likely immigrated with his brother Thomas Hale and sister Martha. Martha married Paul Peck Sr, before 1638, who was also a Hartford founder.

One validation of these siblings comes from the medical journal of Governor John Winthrop, who was also a physician: "25 Mar 1666 • Hartford, Connecticut treated: Peck, Martha: 45 y. wife of Paule, .... wormes & paine in back & other sicknes [sic] wch thinks is wind 2 dos 5g N. N. & 8g to take after. She is sis of Sam: Hale of Wethersfield & hath a bro Tho: Hale at Charleston. Sent word it wrought well, but very sick before it wrought."

Samuel Hale was living in Hartford in 1639.

He was a selectman in Wethersfield in 1647.

He served in the Pequot War, with his brother Thomas, for which he received a lot in the Soldiers' Field.

He moved to Norwalk before 1655 with his brother Thomas.

He served as a deputy in the General Court of the Connecticut Colony representing Norwalk in 1656, 1657, 1658, and 1660.

In 1660, he moved back to Wethersfield.

He is listed on the Founders Stone bearing the names of the founders of Hartford in the Ancient Burying Ground in Hartford, and he is also listed on the Founders Stone bearing the names of the founders of Norwalk in the East Norwalk Historical Cemetery.

Preceded by Matthew Canfield	Deputy of the General Court of the Colony of Connecticut from Norwalk; 1656–1658	Succeeded by Richard Olmsted
Preceded by Matthew Canfield	Deputy of the General Court of the Colony of Connecticut from Norwalk; 1660–1661	Succeeded by Matthew Canfield
