= Nicholas Hoyt =

Deputy of the General Assembly of the Colony of Connecticut from Norwalk
- In office October 1672 – May 1673 Serving with Mark Sension
- Preceded by: Daniel Kellogg, Walter Hoyt
- Succeeded by: Thomas Fitch

Personal details
- Born: May 7, 1620 West Hatch, Somerset, England
- Died: unknown
- Spouse: Susanna Joyce (m. July 12, 1646)
- Children: Samuel, Jonathan, David, Daniel

Nicholas Hoyt (also Nicholas Hayts or Nicholas Hoit) (May 7, 1620 – ?) was a British deputy of the General Assembly of the Colony of Connecticut from Norwalk in the session of October 1673.

Hoyt was the son of Simon Haite and Deborah Stowers. He emigrated to America, arriving on September 6, 1628, with his father and brother, Walter Hoyt, at the age of eight.

By 1630, the family is recorded as being settled in Dorcester, Massachusetts., but later relocated to Scituate, and by 1640, to Windsor, Connecticut.

Preceded by Daniel Kellogg; Walter Hoyt	Deputy of the General Assembly of the Colony of Connecticut from Norwalk; October 1672 – May 1673; With: Mark Sension	Succeeded by Thomas Fitch
