= Matthew Marvin Sr. =

Deputy of the General Court of the Colony of Connecticut from Norwalk
- In office May 1654 – October 1654
- Preceded by: Richard Olmsted
- Succeeded by: Richard Olmsted

Personal details
- Born: Baptized March 26, 1600 Great Bentley, Essex, England
- Died: December 20, 1678 (aged 78) Norwalk, Connecticut Colony
- Resting place: East Norwalk Historical Cemetery, East Norwalk, Connecticut
- Spouse(s): Elizabeth (m. January 1622, St. Mary's, Great Bentley), Alice () Bouton
- Children: Matthew Marvin Jr., Mary Marvin, Sarah Marvin, Hannah Marvin Seymour, Rachel Marvin Smith
- Occupation: Surveyor, husbandman, wheelwright

Matthew Marvin Sr. (bapt. March 26, 1600 – December 20, 1678) was a founding settler of Hartford and Norwalk, Connecticut. He served as a deputy of the General Court of the Colony of Connecticut from Norwalk in the May 1654 session. He served as a magistrate in 1659.

He was the son of Edward and Margaret Mervyn of Great Bentley. He is mentioned in the will of his father, receiving the mansion named Edons alias Dreybrockes and land called Hartles and Brocken Heddes with the condition that he pay his mother yearly for the rest of her life. He most likely lived with her until her death in May 1633. Matthew was "sydeman" of the parish of Great Bentley in 1621, overseer in 1627, and senior warden in 1628.

He came to Hartford with his wife and children from England in 1635 aboard the ship Increase. Marvin was one of the first twelve settlers of Hartford, who formed a company known as the Adventurers, and to whom belonged "Venturers' Field". He resided at the corner of Village and Front Streets. He was a surveyor of highways from 1639 to 1647. In 1648, he was given a cash reward for killing a wolf. He owned land at Farmington and may have lived there a short time.

Marvin went to Norwalk as one of its original settlers in 1650. His home in Norwalk was next to the meeting house. He was a wheelwright. Marvin served as Deputy for Norwalk to the Connecticut General Court in 1654.

He died in Norwalk on December 20, 1678.

He has many prominent American descendants including: Samuel Huntington, Gerald Ford, Bill Gates, and Florence Harding.

In 1902, the East Norwalk school district named Marvin Elementary School after him.

He is listed on the Founders Stone bearing the names of the founders of Hartford in the Ancient Burying Ground in Hartford, and he is also listed on the Founders Stone bearing the names of the founders of Norwalk in the East Norwalk Historical Cemetery.

Preceded by Richard Olmsted	Deputy of the General Court of the Colony of Connecticut from Norwalk; May 1654 – October 1654	Succeeded by Richard Olmsted
