= Thomas Benedict =

Thomas Benedict, Sr.

Member of the General Court of the Colony of Connecticut from Norwalk
- In office May 1670 – October 1670
- Preceded by: John Douglas
- Succeeded by: Daniel Kellogg
- In office May 1675 – October 1675
- Preceded by: Daniel Kellogg
- Succeeded by: Walter Hoyt

Personal details
- Born: 1617 Nottingham, England
- Died: February 28, 1689 Norwalk, Connecticut Colony
- Resting place: East Norwalk Historical Cemetery, Norwalk, Connecticut
- Spouse: Mary Brigham Benedict (m. 1640)
- Children: Thomas Benedict, Jr., John Benedict, Mary Benedict Olmsted, Daniel Benedict, Samuel Benedicy, James Benedict
- Occupation: weaver

Thomas Benedict, Sr. (1617 – February 28, 1689) was an early settler in colonial New York, and Connecticut. He was a member of the General Court of the Colony of Connecticut from Norwalk in the sessions of May 1670, and May 1675.

Preceded by John Douglas	Member of the General Court of the Colony of Connecticut from Norwalk; May 1670 – October 1670	Succeeded by Daniel Kellogg
Preceded by Daniel Kellogg	Member of the General Court of the Colony of Connecticut from Norwalk; May 1675 – October 1675	Succeeded by Walter Hoyt
