= James Fitch (minister) =

English-born minister and pioneer (1622–1702)

The Reverend James Fitch
- Born: 24 December 1622; Bocking, Essex, England
- Died: 18 November 1702 (aged 79); Lebanon, Connecticut Colony, English America
- Occupations: Minister; pioneer
- Known for: Founder of Norwich and Lebanon, Connecticut; envoy to the Mohegans

Rev. James Fitch (24 December 1622 – 18 November 1702) was instrumental in the founding of Norwich and Lebanon, Connecticut. He was the first minister ordained in Saybrook, Connecticut and played a key role in negotiations with the Mohegans during King Philip's War.

== Early life ==
Fitch was born in Bocking, county of Essex, England on 24 December 1622 to Thomas and Anna (Reeve) Fitch. His father died when he was 10 years old but he left money in the will so that his son could study at Cambridge. Instead, Fitch was taken under the wing of a family friend Rev. Thomas Hooker of Chelmsford and probably began studying to be a minister. He studied languages during his youth.

== Immigration to America ==
In 1638 at the age of 16, Fitch sailed to America with his brother Thomas.

He finished his theological study in Hartford, Connecticut under the Reverend Hooker and Reverend Samuel Stone, also of Bocking, England. A new church was built in Saybrook, Connecticut and Fitch was ordained as its first minister in 1646.

== Settlement at Norwich ==
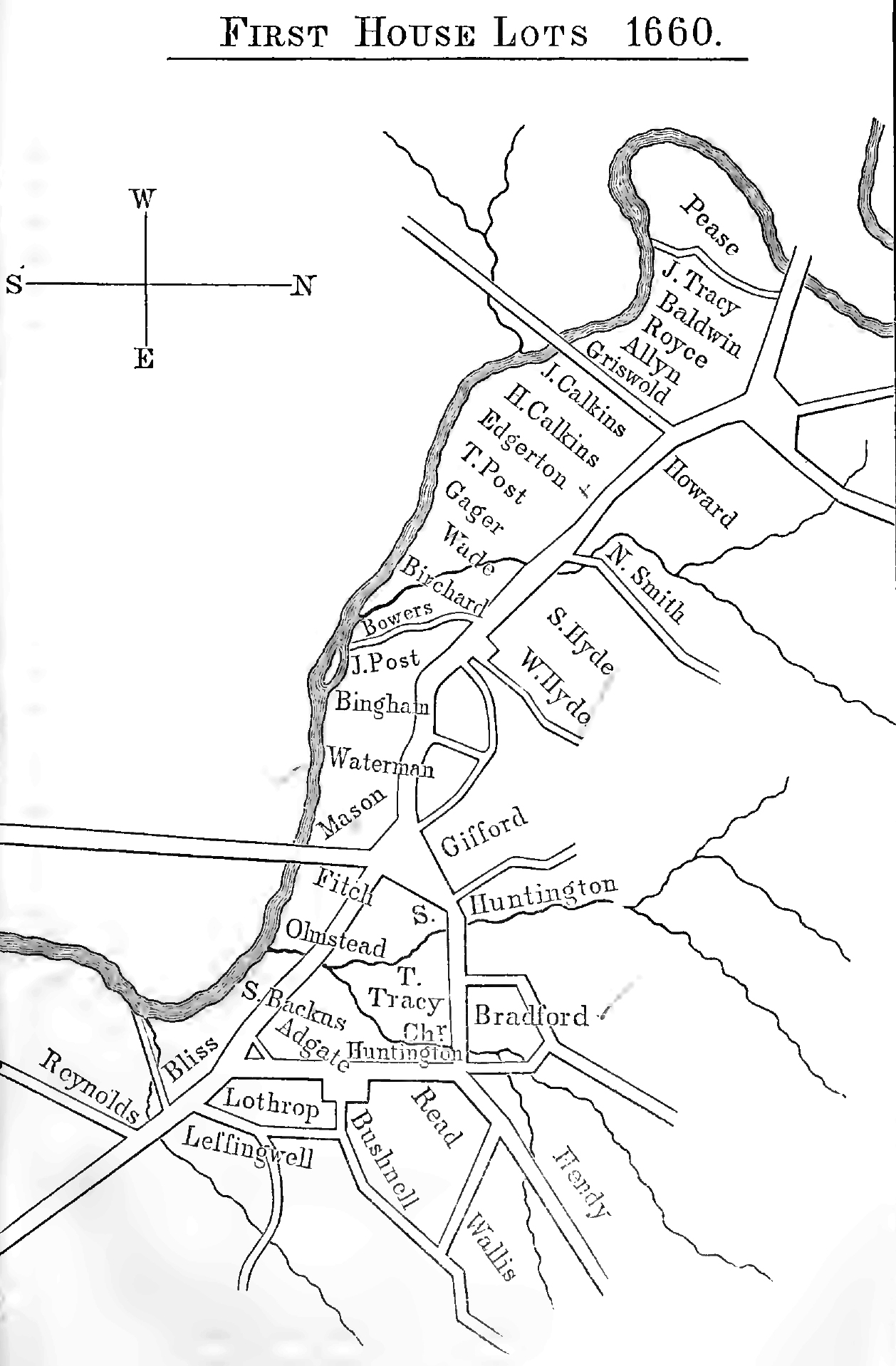
The first lots of Norwich, Connecticut, ca. 1660.

In May of 1659, the congregation at Saybrook applied to the General Court at Hartford for permission to make a new settlement at Norwich and received permission. In June the settlers approached the three sachems of Mohegan - Uncas, Owaneco and Attawanhood - who sold them a nine square mile tract of land. Fitch accompanied the congregation as their leader along with Major John Mason.

Shortly after his arrival at Norwich, the Hartford church extended to him a call to be their pastor. This offered him a wider field and greater influence, but he declined and replied, "With whom then, shall I leave these few poor sheep in the wilderness?" He was devoted to his people, and they retained to the last a deep affection for him.

== Interactions with the Mohegans ==
Rev. Fitch learned several local languages and preached Christianity to the native Americans in their own language.

The Connecticut General Assembly authorized Fitch to hear matters of controversy between Indians and colonists and commissioned him to instruct the Mohegan in the Christian religion. Uncas sought to make Fitch the successor to John Mason's guardianship of the Mohegan after Mason's death in 1672, and initially encouraged tribal members to attend Fitch's instructions. In time, Fitch's Indian congregation grew to about 30 members, but they were constantly harassed by Uncas, who had wavered in his view about Puritan Christianity.

When King Philip's War began in 1675, Rev. Fitch was instrumental in acting as an envoy and getting Uncas and the Mohegans and the Pequots to side with the English against King Philip's Narragansett tribes. His fair dealings with the native tribes spared the English settlers who were on the very frontier at that time.

After the war, he was responsible, in part, for the surrendering Indians formerly allied to Philip that gathered at Shetucket.

The Rev. Mr. Fitch appears to have been a man of true philanthropy and of enlarged missionary zeal. He made early efforts to instruct the natives in the truth of the gospel. He took pains to acquire their tongue, and was a frequent visitor in their wigwams. He impressed them with his own sincerity and benevolence, so that others who like Uncas himself remained obstinate in their unbelief, accorded him their entire confidence and regarded him with affectionate respect. To their temporal, as well as spiritual wants, he was always alive. His converts were formed into a settlement by themselves upon lands which he partly presented and partly procured for them from the town.

— Bishop Lee's Discourse at Norwich Jubilee, p. 133. As quoted in Genealogy of the Fitch Family, page 11.

== Founding of Lebanon ==
The town of Lebanon has its origins with the settlers of Norwich, including Rev. Fitch, who wanted to expand beyond the "nine miles square" they had bought from the Mohegans. In 1666, Connecticut granted 120 acres to Fitch adjacent to his father-in-law John Mason's land which was known as Cedar Swamp. The Mohegan leader Joshua Uncas bequeathed an additional six-mile strip to Mason's son, Captain John Mason Jr. in 1675, who split the land with Fitch, his father-in-law. This area was known as "Fitch and Mason's Mile", or just "The Mile" and became Lebanon.

The stands of white cedar in Cedar Swamp in the Goshen section of town reminded Fitch of the Biblical cedars of Lebanon, which were used to build King Solomon's Temple. The Biblical Lebanon was a mountain with groves of tall cedars and the words 'cedar' and 'Lebanon' are closely identified with the Bible. Although the North American white cedar is not the same species as the true cedar of Lebanon, it was a fitting association for Puritans to make. Thus Fitch gave the name of Lebanon to the new plantation when settlement began. The General Court confirmed the name in 1697. Lebanon was the first town in the colony to receive a Biblical name. The town of Lebanon was incorporated by the General Assembly of the Connecticut Colony on 10 October 1700.

== Family life ==
In October 1648, Fitch married Abigail Whitfield, daughter of the Henry Whitfield of Guilford, Connecticut. They had six children: James, born Aug. 1649; Abigail, Aug. 1650; Elizabeth, Jan. 1651; Hannah, Sept. 1653; Samuel, April 1655 and Dorothy, April 1658. Abigail died on 9 September 1659, just before Fitch moved to Norwich.

Fitch married Priscilla Mason, daughter of Major John Mason in October 1664 at Norwich. This marriage had eight children: Daniel, John, Jeremiah, Jabez, Anna, Nathaniel, Joseph and Ebenzer.

In his latter years, Fitch lived in Lebanon with one of his children and died there in November 1702 at the age of 79. He is buried at the Trumbull Cemetery (also known as the Old Cemetery) in Lebanon.

The brother of Fitch was Thomas Fitch Jr. (14 October 1612 – 14 April 1704) who was a founding settler of Norwalk, Connecticut. He served as a deputy of the General Assembly of the Connecticut Colony representing Norwalk in the May 1673 session.

== Writings ==
Fitch, James (1679) The first pinciples [sic] of the doctrine of Christ together with stronger meat for them that are skil'd in the word of righteousness, or, the doctrine of living unto God, wherein the body of divinity is briefly and methodically handled by way of question and answer / published at the desire and for the use of the Church of Christ in Norwich in New-England. Boston: John Foster.
