= William Ely (divine) =

William Ely (died 1609), was an English Roman Catholic divine.

Ely, brother of Dr. Humphrey Ely, was born in Herefordshire, and educated at Brasenose College, Oxford. He graduated B.A. in 1546, and M.A. in 1549. In 1552 he was appointed one of the clerks of the market. When Thomas Cranmer was brought to the stake to be burnt at Oxford, he took leave of some of his friends standing by, and seeing Ely among them went to shake him by the hand, but the latter, drawing back, said it was not lawful to salute heretics, especially one who falsely returned to the opinions he had forsworn.

Ely entered into holy orders, supplicated for the degree of B.D. 21 June 1557, and had a preaching licence under the seal of the university 25 November 1558. He was always a Catholic at heart, though he conformed for a while "in hopes that things would take another turn." In 1559 he was appointed the second president of St John's College, Oxford, by Sir Thomas White, its founder, but about 1563 he was removed from that office on account of his refusal to acknowledge the supremacy of the queen over the church of England.

Thereupon he retired to the continent, and on his return became a laborious missioner in his own county of Hereford. At length being apprehended he was committed to Hereford gaol, where he spent the remainder of his life. In a report sent to the privy council in 1605 the high sheriff of Herefordshire says: "Mr. Elie, a prisoner there [at Hereford], is a setter forward of their [the jesuits'] desperate designs with all his might, having such liberty as that he rideth up and down the country as he listes."

He died in the prison at a great age in 1609, "being then accounted by those of his persuasion a most holy confessor." Dodd says that "his years and strictness of his morals made him both fear'd and respected, not only by those of his own persuasion, but by most others: who never durst utter anything unbecoming a christian in his presence."
