= John Ely =

John Ely may refer to:

- John Ely (baseball) (born 1986), American professional baseball player
- John Ely (New York politician) (1774–1849), American politician from New York
- John Hart Ely (1938–2003), American legal scholar
- John Ely (Iowa politician) (1919–2007), American politician from Iowa
- John J. Ely (1778–1852), American politician from New Jersey
- John Ely (surgeon), American Revolutionary War surgeon and colonel
