= Thomas Fitch (settler) =

Early settler of colonial Connecticut (1612–1704

- Fitch's coat of arms

Deputy of the General Assembly of the Connecticut Colony for Norwalk
- In office May 1673 – October 1673
- Preceded by: Mark Sension, Nicholas Hoyt
- Succeeded by: John Bowton, Walter Hoyt

Personal details
- Born: Thomas Fitch Jr. October 14, 1612 Braintree, Essex, England
- Died: April 14, 1704 (aged 91) Norwalk, Connecticut Colony, English America
- Resting place: East Norwalk Historical Cemetery
- Spouse: Anne Stacie (m. 1632)
- Children: 4
- Relatives: James Fitch (brother)
- Occupation: Clothier; farmer; landowner; merchant; civil servant

Military service
- Branch/service: Connecticut Colonial Militia
- Rank: Captain
- Battles/wars: King Philip's War

Thomas Fitch Jr. (October 14, 1612 – April 14, 1704) was an English-born clothier, farmer, landowner, merchant, and civil servant who became one of the primary founding settlers and civic leaders of Norwalk, Connecticut.

== Early life and emigration ==
Thomas Fitch Jr. was born on October 14, 1612, in Braintree, Essex, England, as the eldest of several children born to Anna (née Reeve; 1590–1686) and Thomas Fitch Sr. (c. 1590–1632). One of Fitch's younger sibilings was the Rev. James Fitch, who became a minister. Because of Thomas Sr.'s successful career as a clothier, merchant, and property owner, Fitch and his sibilings grew up privileged.

In around 1650, as England was suffering from a severe economic and political crisis due to the Civil War, Fitch alongside his mother and two brothers Joseph and Zachary, emigrated to Norwalk in what was then the Connecticut Colony in New England. They joined Fitch's brother James, who emigrated there around a decade earlier. Joseph subsequently settled in Norwich, another town in Connecticut, while Zachary settled in Reading, in what was the Massachusetts Bay Colony.

Political offices
Preceded by Mark Sension; Nicholas Hoyt	Deputy of the General Assembly of the Connecticut Colony representing Norwalk; May 1673–October 1673	Succeeded by John Bowton; Walter Hoyt
