= Hartford Colony =

- U.S. National Register of Historic Places
- U.S. Historic district
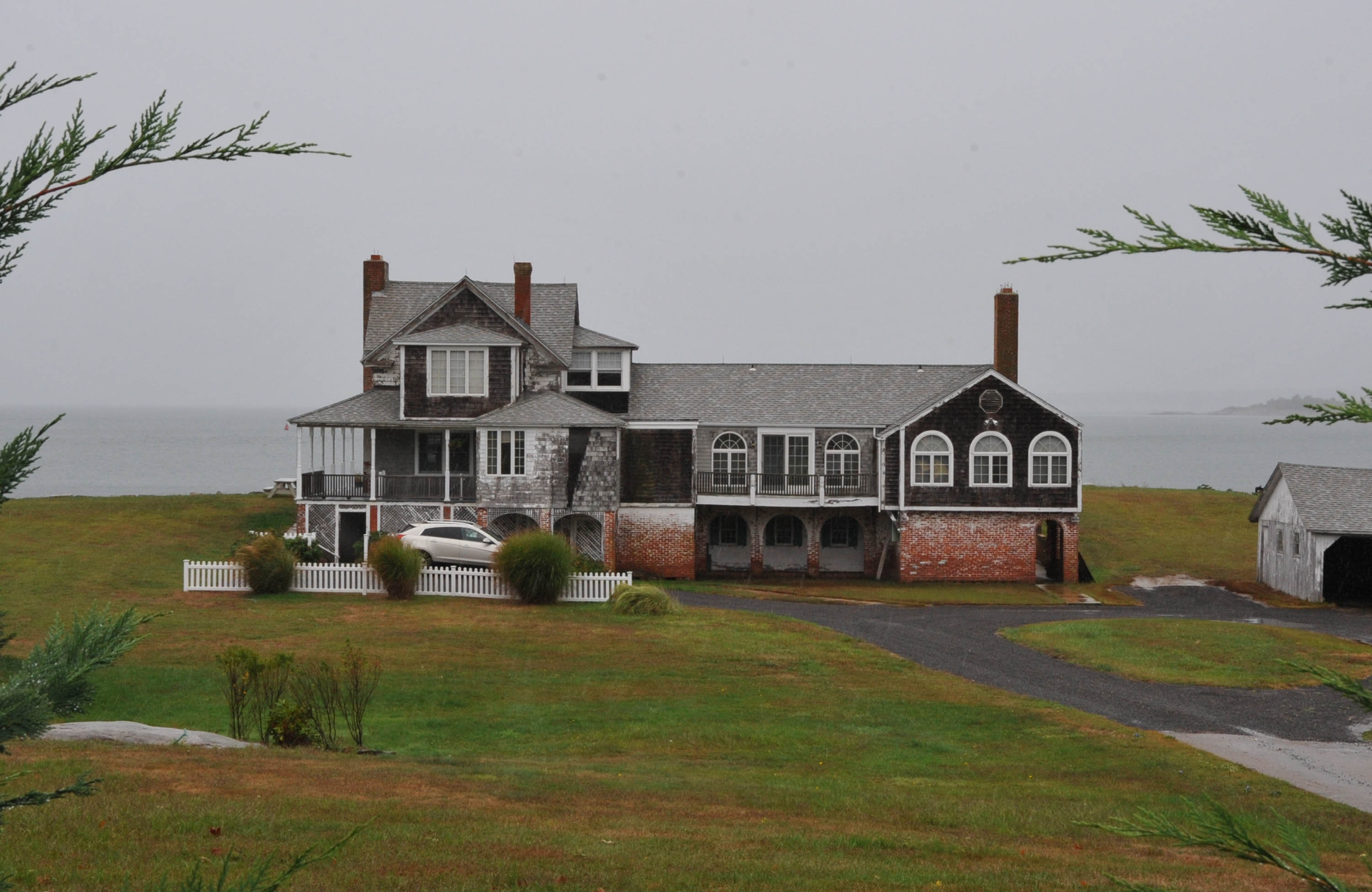
- On New Shore Road

- Location within Connecticut Location within the United States
- Location: Roughly Leonard Court, New Shore Road, and Shore Road, Waterford, Connecticut
- Coordinates: 41°18′19″N 72°8′26″W
- Area: 60 acres (24 ha)
- Architect: Wilson Eyre; Briton Martin
- Architectural style: Shingle Style, Colonial Revival
- NRHP reference No.: 04000414
- Added to NRHP: July 01, 2005

The Hartford Colony is a historic district on the coast of Long Island Sound in Waterford, Connecticut, which was developed as a summer resort area for the wealthy and elite of Hartford. The district extends along Leonard Court, New Shore Road, and Shore Road, and includes properties directly abutting the Sound as well as those with views of it that are on higher ground. The area was developed beginning in 1891 by Henry Cooke White, whose summer estate is located on White Point. The area includes a number of large high-quality Shingle style residences, and includes the work of architects Wilson Eyre and Briton Martin. The district was added to the National Register of Historic Places in 2005.

== Description and history ==
The Hartford Colony is located in the central portion of Waterford's southern coastline. It is set on the southwest side of a lobe of land that forms the east side of Jordan Cove, and includes the south-facing Magonk Point (the district's southern and eastern limit) and southwest-facing White Point, and is roughly bounded on the north by Pleasure Beach and Lindros Lane. A significant number of the properties in the district have shore frontage, and are accessed via either New Shore Road or Shore Road. Other properties in the district also front on those roads. The southern portion of the district is characterized by large lots with multi-building estates, while the northern section includes an area of densely built houses close to the road.

The colony was the development brainchild of Henry C. White, an artist born into a wealthy Hartford family who first saw the area on a summer trip in 1891. He purchased land at what is now called White Point, and had a Shingle-style mansion built there to a design by Wilson Eyre, a prominent Philadelphia architect. The area then attracted a number of high-profile members of Hartford's business and cultural upper crust, including Mary Batterson Beach, the daughter of James Batterson, founder of the Travelers Insurance Company. The Beach estate, also in the Shingle style, overlooks Magonk Point. William Putnam, a friend of White, purchased land for more speculative development at the northern end of the district.

== See also ==
- National Register of Historic Places listings in New London County, Connecticut
