= John Douglas (Connecticut politician) =

Member of the General Court of the Colony of Connecticut from Norwalk
- In office October 1669 – May 1670
- Preceded by: Richard Olmsted
- Succeeded by: Thomas Benedict

John Douglas ( – ) was a member of the General Court of the Colony of Connecticut from Norwalk in the October 1669 session.

Preceded by Richard Olmsted	Member of the General Court of the Colony of Connecticut from Norwalk; October 1669–May 1670	Succeeded by Thomas Benedict
