= East Norwalk =

Coordinates: 41.103°N 73.404°W

East Norwalk, Connecticut
- Neighborhood
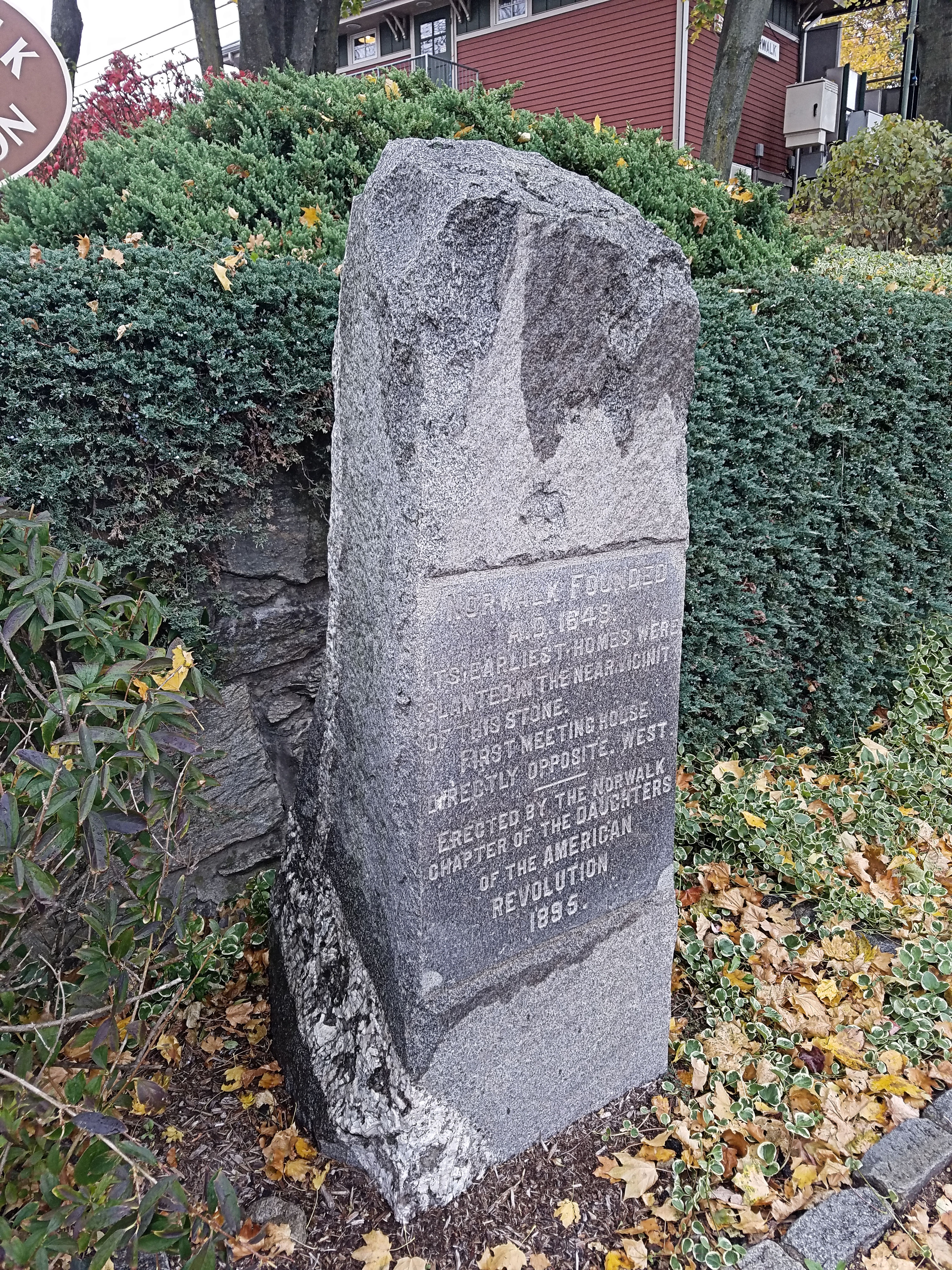
- Founding Monument in East Norwalk
- Interactive map of East Norwalk, Connecticut
- Country: United States
- State: Connecticut
- County: Fairfield
- City: Norwalk
- Time zone: UTC-5:00 (Eastern)
  - Summer (DST): UTC-4:00 (Eastern)
- Area codes: 475, 203

East Norwalk is a neighborhood of Norwalk, Connecticut, United States. It is located mostly in Norwalk's third taxing district with segments of its northernmost area within the first and fifth taxing districts. As one of the earliest settlements of Norwalk, it was so marked with a block of 'suitably inscribed' 'native granite' formally located on the corner of Fitch Street and East Avenue.

== History ==
East Norwalk is the location of Norwalk's original colonial settlements. The land was purchased from the Norwalke Indians by Roger Ludlow in 1640. Historical markers in the neighborhood include the Founding Monument on East Avenue and the First Settlers Monument inside the East Norwalk Historical Cemetery.

British forces under General William Tryon arrived on July 10, 1779, at Fitch's Point and destroyed most of Norwalk by fire; only six houses were spared. A portion, of then former Governor Thomas Fitch's house was left standing and in the 1950s it was moved to the Mill Hill Historic Park to make way for the construction of the Connecticut Turnpike (I-95).

In 1913, East Norwalk combined with the Town of Norwalk, the City (formerly Borough) of Norwalk, and the city of South Norwalk into the present day City of Norwalk. East Norwalk is now within the city's third taxing district.

== Neighborhood associations ==
• East Norwalk Association: "The East Norwalk Improvement Association was founded in 1910 and "rebranded" as the East Norwalk Association in 2013. The association has been active in East Norwalk continuously for more than 100 years and founded its East Norwalk Association Library in 1915."

• East Norwalk Neighborhood Association (ENNA): Formerly the Eastern Norwalk Neighborhood Association which began in 2001 as 'VZSHAN', Van Zant to Sunset Hill Association of Neighbors formed to address zoning, development, traffic and other “quality of life” concerns shared by residents in neighborhoods along East Avenue on both sides of the Interstate. Today the East Norwalk Neighborhood Association area is Calf Pasture Beach north to Interstate 95 and Norwalk River and Harbor east to Westport. Residents of postal zip code 06855 are automatically members of ENNA.

== Surrounding neighborhoods ==
Norwalk's neighborhoods do not have official status, and as such are boundary deficient. Nonetheless, East Norwalk's location within the city of Norwalk can be roughly described as being south of Interstate 95, east of the Norwalk River, north of a line from the Norwalk River along 5th Street to Gregory Boulevard, west of a line along Gregory Boulevard to Emerson Street then along Stanley Street then along Strawberry Hill Avenue back to Interstate 95.

== Attractions, landmarks and facilities ==
One prominent local institution in the neighborhood is Overton's Seafood, a 60-year-old "landmark food stand" that closes down in the colder months. The owner also owns the neighboring Harbor Lights waterfront restaurant and the East Side cafe. The food stand was founded by Willis Overton in 1948 and sold to the Gavrielidis family in 2000 because the Gavrielidises were the only potential buyers who promised not to tear it down, according to Willis' son, Neil.

=== East Norwalk Historical Cemetery ===
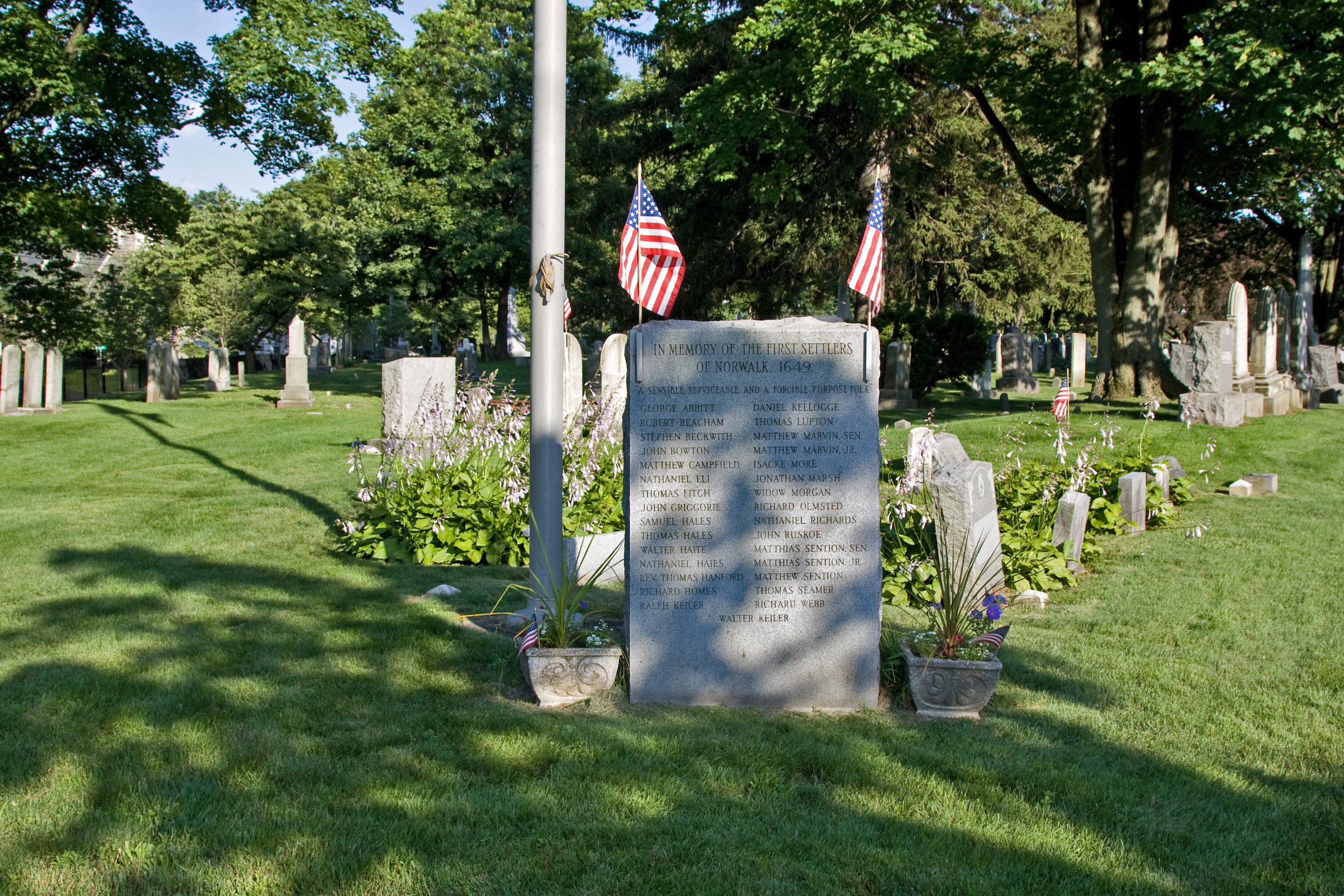
The First Settlers Monument in the East Norwalk Historical Cemetery

The burial location of some the first settlers of Norwalk including Governor Thomas Fitch, IV, and Thomas Fitch, V, the inspiration for the song "Yankee Doodle".

=== Veterans Memorial Park ===
"Veteran's Memorial Park and Marina" is situated on 35 acres, and includes a marina and boat launch site, a playground, bicycle and jogging paths, basketball courts, soccer, hockey, and football fields, baseball diamonds, visitor docks with full power available, a boating center and marina. The park also includes a walk esplanade overlooking scenic Norwalk Harbor." It is also the site of the assembly of the annual Memorial Day parade.

The land, formally named Duffy's Field, was also once a dumpsite that was never environmentally tested. Dumping continued until the 1960s. Veterans Park was built before the state Department of Environmental Protection had a permitting process for old dumpsites.

=== Norwalk Oyster Festival ===
The Norwalk Oyster Festival is an annual festival located in Veterans Memorial Park, held in September each year.

=== Transportation ===
•Public transport bus service within Norwalk is provided by Norwalk Transit District, also known as Wheels.
•Metro-North Railroad's New Haven Line runs through and stops at East Norwalk.

=== Emergency services ===
The city of Norwalk Fire Department operates 1 Fire Station in East Norwalk: Fire Station # 3 is located at 56 Van Zant St. Fire Station # 3 was the home of the Mayflower Volunteer Hook & Ladder Co. 1, one of the city's original volunteer fire companies.
