= John Bowton =

American founding settler (1615–1705)

John Bouton

Deputy of the General Assembly of the Colony of Connecticut from Norwalk
- In office October 1671, October 1673, May 1674, May 1675, October 1676, May and October 1677, May 1678, October 1679, May 1680, May 1681, May and October 1682. May 1683, and May and October 1685 – May 1686
- Preceded by: Walter Hoyt
- Succeeded by: John Platt

Personal details
- Born: October 1615 Hartford, Connecticut Colony
- Died: January 1705 (aged 89–90) Norwalk, Connecticut Colony
- Resting place: East Norwalk Historical Cemetery, Norwalk, Connecticut
- Spouse: joan Turney (1651) 2nd Abigail Marvin (m. January 1, 1657) 3rd Mary Stwvwnson (1673)
- Children: John, Matthew, Hannah, Joseph, Rachel, Abigail, Mary, Elizabeth

John Bowton (also John Boughton) (1615–1705) was a founding settler of Norwalk, Connecticut. He served as a deputy of the General Assembly of the Colony of Connecticut from Norwalk in the sessions of October 1671, October 1673, May 1674, May 1675, October 1676, May and October 1677, May 1678, October 1679, May 1680, May 1681, May and October 1682. May 1683, and May and October 1685.

He was the son of Count Nikolas Bouton (France). He was the nephew of Noell Bouton Marshall of All of France. Protestant fled france to gravesend England departing for the Colonies on July 1635 on board the ASSURANCE and landing in Boston in December 1635 at the age of 20.

He is listed on the Founders Stone bearing the names of the founding settlers of Norwalk in the East Norwalk Historical Cemetery.

Preceded by Walter Hoyt	Member of the General Court of the Colony of Connecticut from Norwalk; October 1671, October 1673, May 1674, May 1675, October 1676, May and October 1677, May 1678, October 1679, May 1680, May 1681, May and October 1682. May 1683, and May and October 1685	Succeeded by John Platt
