= Matthew Canfield =

American lawyer (1604–1673)

Matthew Campfield

Deputy of the General Court of the Colony of Connecticut from Norwalk
- In office May 1654, May 1655, May 1656, May 1657, May 1658, May 1659, May 1660, May 1661, May and October 1662, October 1663, May and October 1664, May and October 1665, and May and October 1666 – May 1667

Personal details
- Born: February 27, 1604 Harleston, Northamptonshire, England
- Died: after March 19, 1673 and before June 11, 1673 (aged 68–69) Newark, Province of New Jersey
- Resting place: Old Burying Ground, near the site of present day Newark City Hall; Newark Province of New Jersey
- Spouse(s): Sarah Treat (m. before 1643, New Haven Colony), sister of Robert Treat
- Children: Samuel Canfield, Sarah Canfield, Ebenezer Canfield, Matthew Canfield, Hannah Canfield, Rachel Canfield, Jonathan Canfield, Ruth Canfield, Mary Canfield
- Occupation: Carpenter, builder and grazier-farmer

Matthew Canfield (also seen as Matthew Campfield) (1604 – 1673) was a founding settler of Norwalk, Connecticut and Newark, New Jersey. He served as a deputy of the General Court of the Connecticut Colony representing Norwalk in the sessions of May 1654, May 1655, May 1656, May 1657, May 1658, May 1659, May 1660, May 1661, May and October 1662, October 1663, May and October 1664, May and October 1665, and May and October 1666.

He was born in Harleston, Northamptonshire, England and baptized in Saint Andrews Church on February 27, 1604. He was the son of Gregory and Joan Camfield.

He came to the New Haven Colony from England prior to 1637.

He was a collector for Yale College in 1645.

He served as an officer in the Cavalry Troop of Connecticut from 1650-66.

In February 1652, Camfield sold his home lot in New Haven. That year, he moved to Norwalk, becoming one of the area's original settlers. He lived in Norwalk for fourteen years, becoming one of the settlement's and the colony's prominent citizens.

He was a deputy of the Connecticut General Court from Norwalk in 1654.

In 1662, he was a magistrate and judge for the court in Fairfield.

He was one of the 19 signers of the Petition to King Charles II for the Charter of the Colony.

In 1666, Matthew removed to Newark, Province of New Jersey along with his brother-in-law Robert Treat, where he was one of the founders of that town. His home lot was located at about the present north-west corner of Washington and Market Streets. Apparent his departure from Norwalk is based upon some dissatisfaction with the union of the New Haven and Hartford colonies.

Canfield Island in East Norwalk is named for him.

He is listed on the Founders Stone bearing the names of the founding settlers of Norwalk in the East Norwalk Historical Cemetery.
