= East Norwalk Historical Cemetery =

- Interactive map of East Norwalk Historical Cemetery

Details
- Established: c. 1655
- Location: East Norwalk, Connecticut
- Country: United States
- Coordinates: 41.102°N 73.403°W
- Owned by: Norwalk's Third Taxing District
- No. of interments: 1100
- Website: East Norwalk Historical Cemetery
- Find a Grave: East Norwalk Historical Cemetery

Established in c. 1655, the East Norwalk Historical Cemetery is Norwalk's oldest cemetery, and many of the area's first settlers are buried there. The cemetery is owned and maintained by the Third Taxing District, formally known as the East Norwalk Fire District of the Town of Norwalk, and before that it was known as the Down Town School District. Triangle shaped and surrounded clockwise by Gregory Boulevard, Cemetery Street and East Avenue it is situated in the neighborhood of East Norwalk.

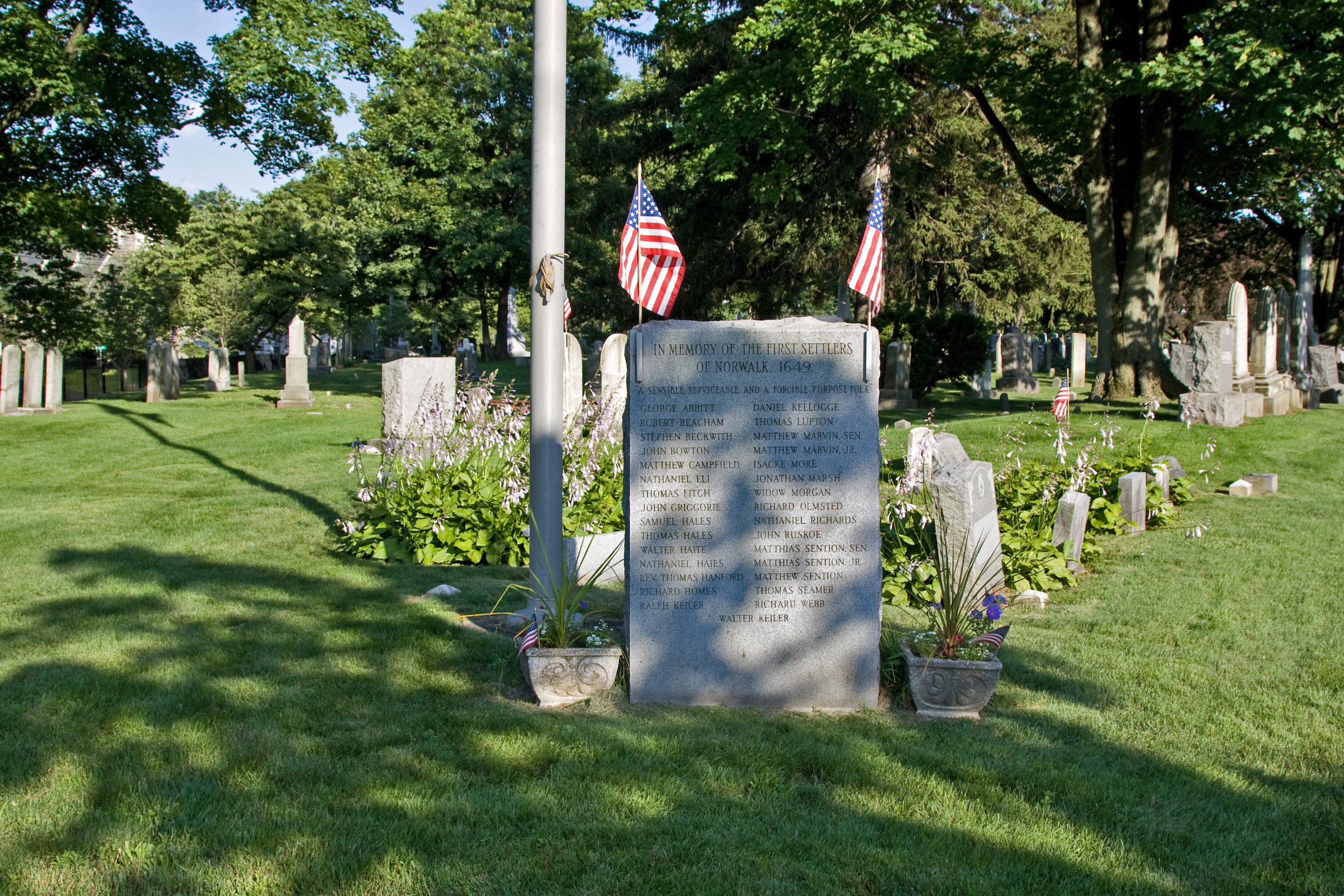
First Settlers of Norwalk Memorial

Many graves are unmarked by headstones as remains were deposited before stones were available, and of which no mark or tradition is known.

In 1843, the Down Town Cemetery Association was founded to maintain and conduct the business of the cemetery. In 1933, the name was changed to the East Norwalk Cemetery Association. In 1941, the Norwalk Third Taxing District entered into an agreement to supplement the association's perpetual care fund, due to a dwindling amount of donations. In 1966, the district took the deed to the land, so as to secure better insurance. Today, the district provides for the perpetual care of the grounds, while cemetery business is conducted by volunteers of the association.

== Notable burials ==
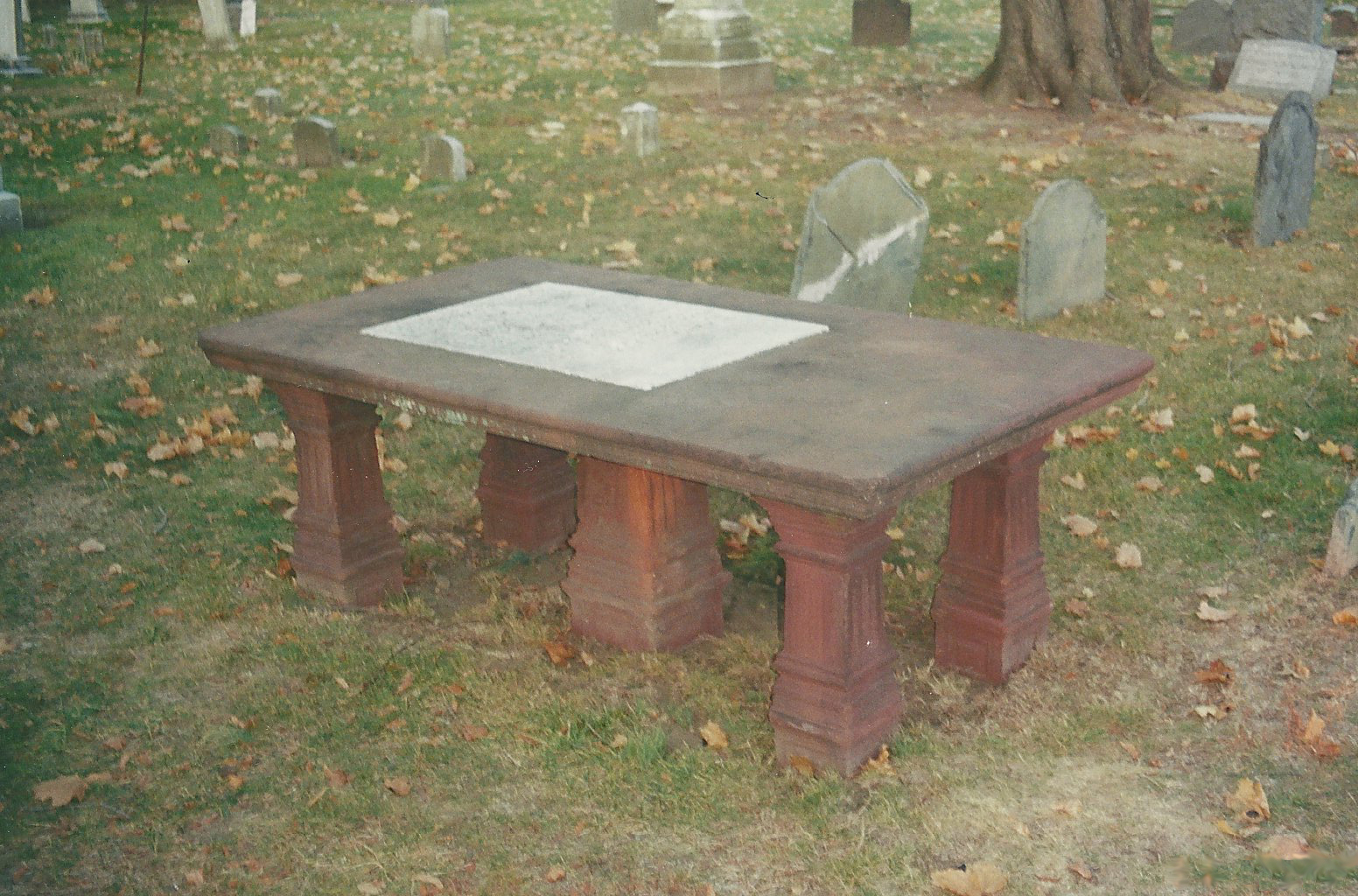
The table tomb of Governor Thomas Fitch

- John Bowton (1636–1707), founding settler of Norwalk
- John Copp (1673–1751), teacher, doctor, member of the Connecticut House of Representatives from Norwalk, purchaser and surveyor of Ridgefield, Connecticut, town clerk of Norwalk and Ridgefield, town treasurer and surveyor of Bedford
- Samuel Daskam (1823–1912), warden of the Borough of Norwalk from 1874 to 1877
- Thomas Fitch, Jr. (1612–1704), founding settler of Norwalk
- Thomas Fitch, IV (1699–1774), Governor of Connecticut
- Colonel Thomas Fitch (1725–1795), widely believed to be the original "Yankee Doodle" dandy
- Reverend Thomas Hanford (1621–1693), first minister of the colony, a flat brown stone marks the grave, however the inscription is obliterated
- John Gregory (1612–1689), founding settler of Norwalk
- Daniel Kellogg (1630–1688), founding settler of Norwalk
- Richard Olmsted (1612-1687), founding settler of Norwalk
- Matthew Marvin, Sr. (1600–1678), founding settler of Norwalk (no extant stone)
- Joseph Platt (1672–1748), longest serving state representative from Norwalk
- Samuel Smith (1646–1735), early settler of Norwalk, Connecticut and deputy of the General Assembly of the Colony of Connecticut from Norwalk in 1691
- Richard Webb (1580–1665), founding settler of Norwalk

== See also ==
- History of Norwalk, Connecticut
- Mill Hill Historic Park
- Pine Island Cemetery
