= Daniel Betts Jr. =

American politician

Member of the Connecticut House of Representatives from Norwalk
- In office 1777–1777
- Preceded by: Thaddeus Betts, Thomas Fitch, V
- Succeeded by: Stephen St. John, Clapp Raymond

Personal details
- Born: May 2, 1699 Norwalk, Connecticut
- Died: July 10, 1783 (aged 84) Wilton, Connecticut
- Spouse: Sarah Comstock Betts (born 1707, m. 1724)
- Children: 2

Daniel Betts Jr. (May 2, 1699 – Jul. 10, 1783) was a member of the Connecticut House of Representatives from Norwalk in 1777.

He was born May 2, 1699, in Norwalk, the son of Daniel Betts and Deborah Taylor Betts.

In 1774, he served on a committee appointed in Norwalk to address the 11th article adopted by the Continental Congress.

Preceded by Thaddeus Betts; Thomas Fitch, V	Member of the Connecticut House of Representatives from Norwalk; 1777; With: Moses Comstock	Succeeded by Stephen St. John; Clapp Raymond
