= Hezekiah Rogers =

American politician (1753–1811)

Member of the Connecticut House of Representatives from Norwalk
- In office May 1786 – October 1786 Serving with Thaddeus Betts
- Preceded by: Samuel Cook Silliman, Thaddeus Betts
- Succeeded by: Samuel Cook Silliman, Eliphalet Lockwood
- In office October 1787 – May 1788 Serving with Samuel Cook Silliman
- Preceded by: Thomas Belden, Samuel Cook Silliman
- Succeeded by: Thomas Belden, Samuel Cook Silliman

Personal details
- Born: 1753
- Died: September 4, 1811
- Spouse: Esther Raymond (b. February 13, 1757; m. March 9, 1781)
- Children: Sally, William, Charles

Military service
- Rank: Major
- Battles/wars: American Revolutionary War

Hezekiah Rogers (1753 – September 4, 1811) was a member of the Connecticut House of Representatives from Norwalk in the sessions of May 1786, and October 1787. He was a delegate to the convention in Connecticut to ratify the United States Constitution in 1788. He later served as chief clerk in the War Office in Washington, D. C.

== Early life and family ==
Rogers was the son of Dr. Uriah Rogers Sr. and Hannah Lockwood.

== Political life ==
Rogers was a member of the Connecticut House of Representatives from Norwalk in the sessions of May 1786, and October 1787.

On November 12, 1787, the inhabitants of the town of Norwalk had a town meeting with Colonel Colonel Thomas Fitch as moderator. Rogers and Samuel Silliman were chosen as delegates to meet in a convention at Hartford, the following January to ratify the United States Constitution. Connecticut ratified the Constitution on January 8, 1788 making it the fifth state to do so.

== Jesse Lee ==
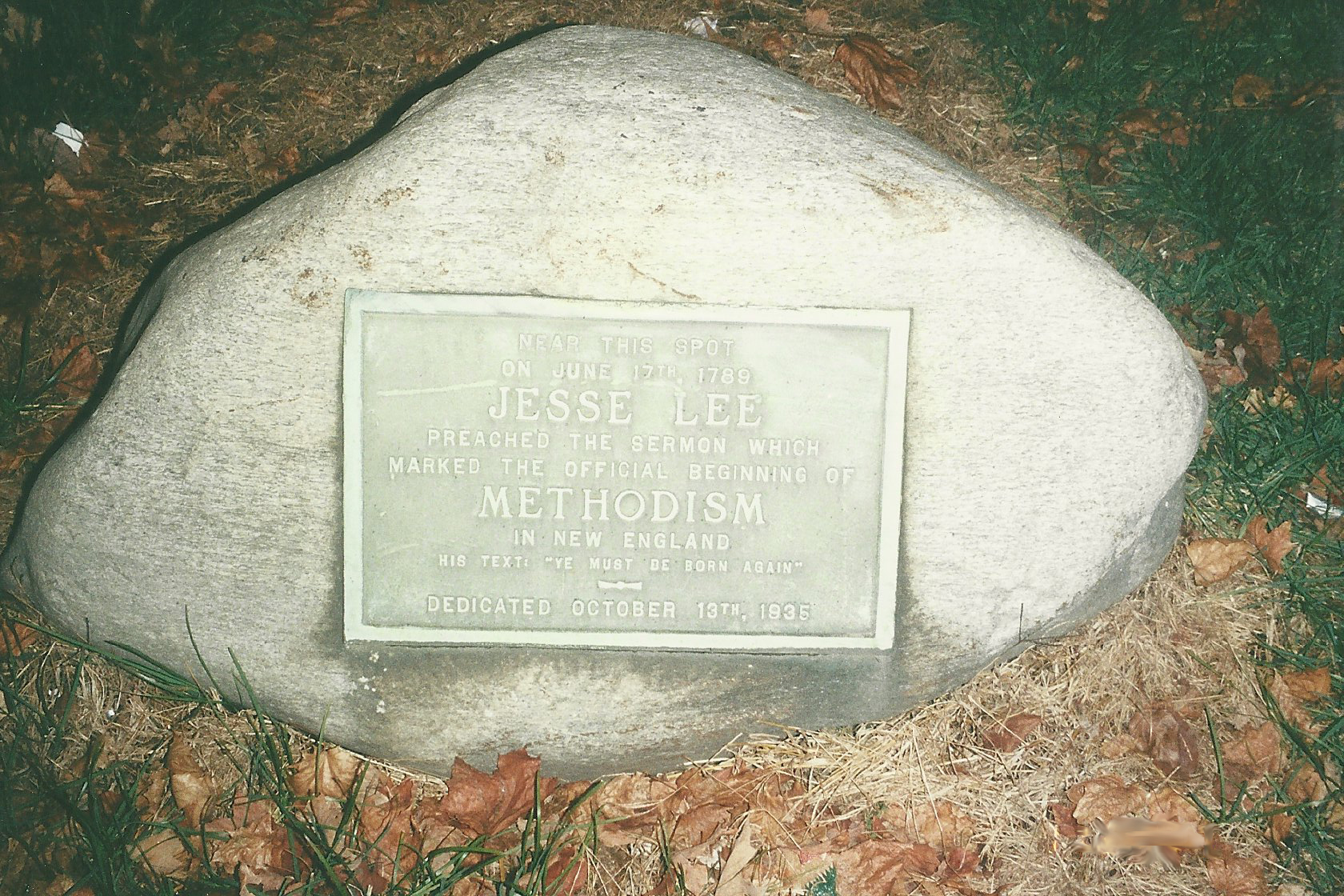

In June 1789, Jesse Lee, a founder of the Methodist Church, came to Norwalk to preach his first sermon in Connecticut. He had some reason to believe that the Rogers house on Cross Street would be available for the meeting, and word had been sent around among those interested to assemble there. When Lee arrived, Hezekiah was not at home, and his wife hesitated to open the house to a public meeting. A neighbor refused to let Lee use her orchard for concern that the gathering would trample down the grass. Finally, Lee assembled his audience under an apple tree by the roadside and preached his sermon from the text "Ye must be born again." Such was the beginning of Methodism in Norwalk. Today, there is a stone marker at the location.

Preceded by Samuel Cook Silliman; Thaddeus Betts	Member of the Connecticut House of Representatives from Norwalk; May 1786 – October 1786; With: Thaddeus Betts	Succeeded by Samuel Cook Silliman; Eliphalet Lockwood
Preceded by Thomas Belden; Samuel Cook Silliman	Member of the Connecticut House of Representatives from Norwalk; October 1787 – May 1788; With: Samuel Cook Silliman	Succeeded by Thomas Belden; Samuel Cook Silliman
