= Charles Sherman =

Charles Sherman may refer to:

- Charles Taylor Sherman (1811–1879), Ohio lawyer and judge
- Cy Sherman (Charles Sumner Sherman, 1871–1951), American journalist, known as the "father of the Cornhuskers"
- Charles Robert Sherman (1788–1829), American lawyer and public servant
- Charles Sherman (artist) (born 1947), American artist
- Charles Phineas Sherman (1874–1962), professor of Roman law and canon law
