= Moses Comstock =

American politician

Member of the Connecticut House of Representatives from Norwalk
- In office 1777–1778
- Preceded by: Thomas Fitch, V, Thaddeus Betts
- Succeeded by: Clapp Raymond, Stephen St. John

Personal details
- Born: 1714 Norwalk, Connecticut
- Died: January 18, 1789 New Canaan, Connecticut
- Spouse: Elizabeth St. John (m. June 30, 1748)

Moses Comstock (1714 – January 18, 1789) was a member of the Connecticut House of Representatives from Norwalk in 1777.

He was the son of Moses Comstock and Abigail Brinsmade.

In 1777, Eli Reed, Asa Hoyt, John Gregory, Jr., Levi Taylor, Nathan Hubbell, and Moses Comstock were appointed a Committee to find the number of soldiers enlisted in the Continental Army, in Norwalk, and report to the Norwalk town meeting.

His father, also named Moses, was the owner of the last slave in Connecticut, Onesimus Brown.

He died in New Canaan on January 18, 1789.

Preceded by Thomas Fitch, V Thaddeus Betts	Member of the Connecticut House of Representatives from Norwalk; 1777–1778; With: Daniel Betts, Jr.	Succeeded by Clapp Raymond; Stephen St. John
