= Battle of Bull's Ferry =

1780 battle of the American Revolutionary War

- Part of the American Revolutionary War
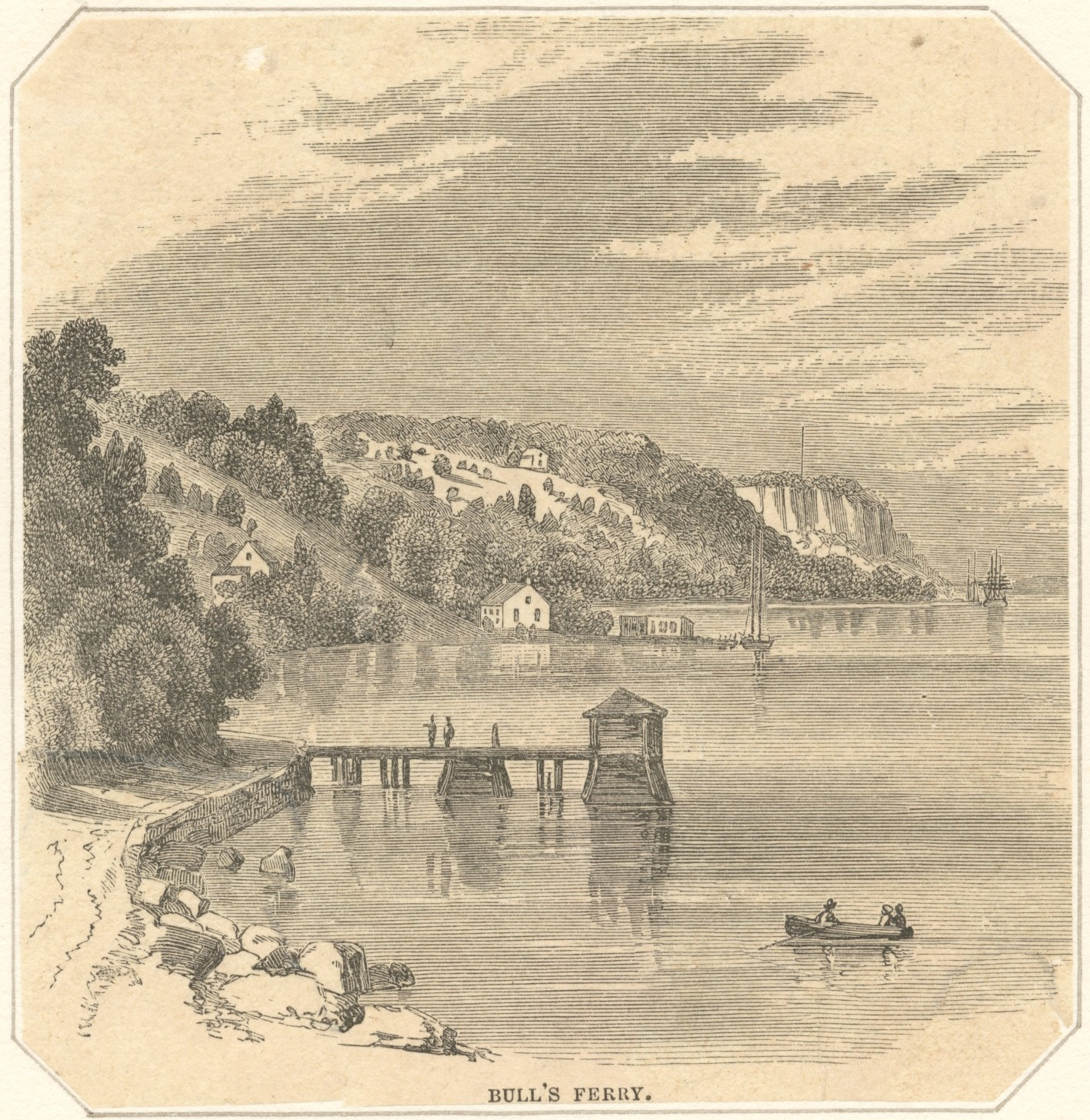
- 19th-century illustration of Bulls Ferry
Date	20–21 July 1780
Location	Bulls Ferry, New Jersey 40.789°N 74.000°W
Result	British victory

Belligerents
Great Britain	United States

Commanders and leaders
Thomas Ward	Anthony Wayne

Strength
70	~2,000

Casualties and losses
5 killed 16 wounded	15 killed 49 wounded

The Battle of Bull's Ferry on 20 and 21 July 1780 saw two American brigades under Brigadier-General Anthony Wayne attack a party of Loyalists led by Thomas Ward. The Loyalists successfully defended a blockhouse against an ineffective bombardment by four American artillery pieces and a failed attempt to storm the position by Wayne's troops. During the action, American light dragoons under Major Henry Lee III drove off a large number of cattle that were kept in the area for the use of the British forces stationed in New York City. The clash inspired British Major John André to write a satirical ballad entitled The Cow Chace. The skirmish was fought at Bulls Ferry, New Jersey in the Northern theater of the American Revolutionary War after Saratoga. At this stage of the conflict only raids and minor actions occurred in the north.

== Background ==
The Battle of Monmouth on 28 June 1778 was the last significant engagement in the north. After the battle, George Washington marched his army to New Brunswick, New Jersey, arriving there on 2 July. Leaving William Maxwell's brigade in New Jersey, the main body of the American army crossed the Hudson River. By 24 July Washington's army arrived at White Plains, New York and placed the British garrison of New York City in a blockade that lasted the remainder of the war. In late July, the French admiral Charles Hector, comte d'Estaing arrived off Sandy Hook with one 90-gun ship of the line, one 80, six 74s, two 64s, and one 50, plus four frigates. Badly outgunned, Sir Richard Howe prepared to defend the entrance to New York harbor with six 64s, three 50s, six frigates, four galleys, and an armed merchantman. Meanwhile, British commander Sir Henry Clinton at Sandy Hook needed Howe's ships to transport his army to New York, otherwise he might be trapped. D'Estaing, whose larger vessels drew 30 feet (9.1 m) was informed by local pilots that there was only 23 feet (7.0 m) of water over the bar. On the morning of 22 July the frustrated French admiral sailed away. That afternoon a high tide pushed 30 feet of water over the bar and thus an opportunity to end the war in 1778 was missed.

On 27 September 1778, the British wiped out the 3rd Continental Light Dragoons in the Baylor Massacre. On the American side, Anthony Wayne carried out a brilliant coup in the Battle of Stony Point on 16 July 1779. This feat was followed on 19 August 1779 by another successful raid by Henry Lee III in the Battle of Paulus Hook.

With a total of 27,000 troops on the Atlantic coast of North America, Clinton decided to move against Charleston, South Carolina. Leaving Wilhelm von Knyphausen to hold New York with 10,000 soldiers, Clinton embarked for the south with 8,700 troops in the fleet of Mariot Arbuthnot on 26 December 1779. Clinton was later reinforced so that his army numbered 12,500. The subsequent capitulation of Benjamin Lincoln's army in the Siege of Charleston on 12 May 1780 represented the largest American mass surrender of the war. As many as 5,500 men were captured, including 2,650 irreplaceable Continental Army soldiers. Leaving Lord Charles Cornwallis in South Carolina with two-thirds of the army, Clinton headed back to New York.

Meanwhile, Knyphausen staged the Springfield Raid in June 1780. The Hessian general started out with 5,000 men on 7 June. That day, he was successfully blocked by Elias Dayton's Continentals and militia in the Battle of Connecticut Farms. Clinton returned to New York on 17 June. Hearing that a French fleet and army was on the way to Newport, Rhode Island, the British commander sent some ships up the Hudson to make it difficult for the Americans to cross to the east side and join the French. Washington moved his army to cover his key fort at West Point, New York on the Hudson, leaving Nathanael Greene to shield his base at Morristown, New Jersey. On 23 June, Knyphausen lunged at Morristown. In the Battle of Springfield, Greene's division slowed the Hessian general's thrust. That evening Knyphausen withdrew into Staten Island.

== Battle ==
Henry Lee III's dragoons rounded up cattle during the battle.

On 20 July 1780, Washington ordered Wayne to take the 1st and 2nd Pennsylvania Brigades, four artillery pieces, and Stephen Moylan's 4th Continental Light Dragoons to destroy a British blockhouse at Bulls Ferry in Bergen Township, opposite New York City. The stockaded position was held by 70 Loyalists commanded by Thomas Ward, providing a base for British woodcutting operations and protection against raids by American militia.

At that time, the British kept cattle and horses on Bergen Neck to the south, within easy reach of foragers from the British garrison at Paulus Hook. A second motive for Wayne's operation was to seize the livestock for the use of Washington's army. Wayne sent his cavalry under the leadership of Lee to round up the cattle, while he took three regiments and the artillery to attack the blockhouse.

Early on 21 July, Wayne bombarded the blockhouse with his four cannons, but an hour later there were no discernible results. After being peppered with accurate fire from the blockhouse, the American soldiers from the 1st and 2nd Pennsylvania Regiments became impatient. Despite their officers' attempts to stop them, the soldiers dashed forward through the abatis to the base of the stockade. Once there, they found it impossible to break into the defensive works, and were forced to retreat.

== Aftermath ==
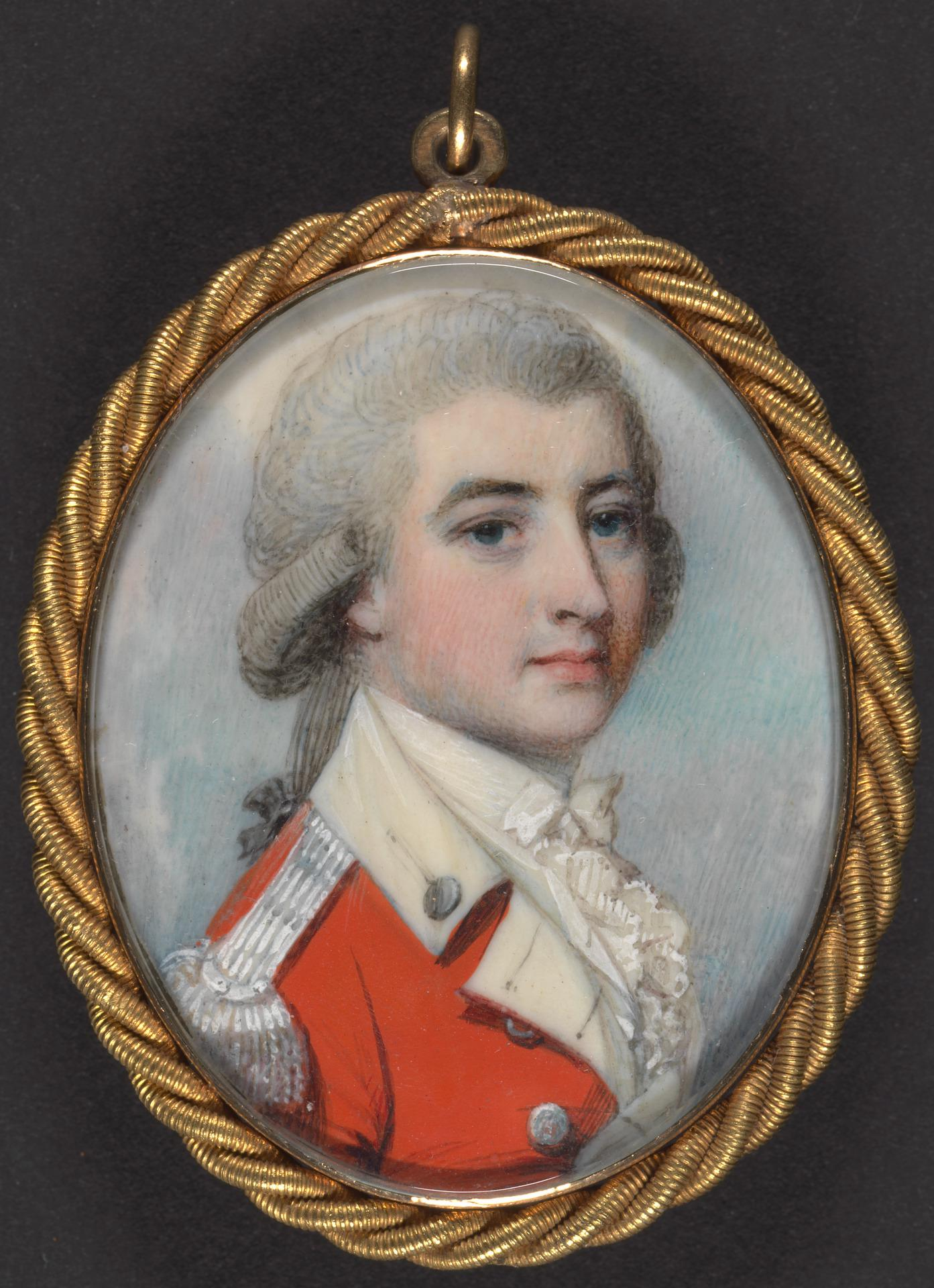
Major John André, who penned the satirical verse The Cow Chace about the battle.

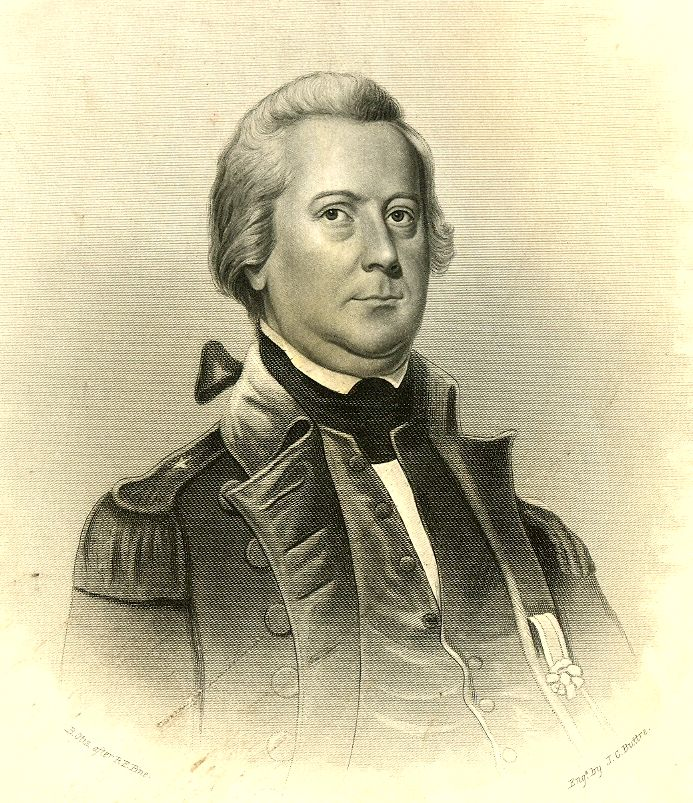
William Irvine, who was viciously lampooned by André.

Aside from John André's ballad, the consequences of the skirmish were the loss of lives and the seizure of cattle. Wayne reported losses of 15 enlisted men killed, plus three officers and 46 enlisted men wounded. Clinton estimated that Wayne had almost 2,000 troops available. He admitted the loss of 21 casualties and reported that 50 round shot penetrated the blockhouse. In a poetical note at the end of The Cow Chace, André suggested that five Loyalists were killed.

Five refugees ('tis true) were found,
Stiff on the blockhouse floor;
But then 'tis thought the shot went round,
And in at the back door.

In one stanza, the André poked fun at American claims that their cannonballs could not damage the blockhouse.

No shot could pass, if you will take
The General's word for true;
But 'tis a d(amna)ble mistake,
For every shot went through.

Lee rounded up a substantial number of cattle and returned them to Washington's camp. Wayne burned the wood-cutters' boats and captured some of the boatmen. From André's fifth stanza, it is clear that Colonel Thomas Proctor commanded Wayne's artillery. Proctor was born in Ireland ("remoter Shannon").

And sons of distant Delaware,
And still remoter Shannon,
And Major Lee with horses rare,
And Procter with his cannon.

André mocked Wayne's subordinate Brigadier General William Irvine, who fought at Bull's Ferry. The British major credited Irvine, misspelled "Irving", with command of the attack on the blockhouse while Wayne and Lee had the easy work of cattle rustling.

At Irving's nod 'twas fine to see,
The left prepare to fight;
The while, the drovers, Wayne and Lee,
Drew off upon the right.

Two later stanzas made fun of the retreat of Irvine's column.

Irving and terror in the van,
Came flying all abroad;
And cannon, colors, horse, and man,
Ran tumbling to the road.

Still as he fled, 'twas Irving's cry,
And his example too,
"Run on, my merry men – For why?
The shot will not go through."

The British major even took a swipe at William Alexander, Lord Stirling who was not even involved in the operation. Alexander had made an unsuccessful attempt to claim a Scottish earldom between 1756 and 1762. His hard-drinking ways were well known to British officers.

Let none candidly infer,
That Stirling wanted spunk;
The self-made peer had sure been there,
But that the peer was drunk.

Alluding to his pre-war career as a tanner, André poked fun at Wayne in the first and last stanzas.

To drive the kine one summer's morn,
The tanner took his way;
The calf shall rue that is unborn,
The jumbling of that day.

And now I've clos'd my epic strain,
I tremble as I show it,
Lest this same warrior-drover, Wayne,
Should ever catch the poet.
