= Samuel Cook Silliman =

American politician

Member of the Connecticut House of Representatives from Norwalk

Personal details
- Born: November 12, 1742
- Died: February 14, 1795 (aged 53) New Canaan, Connecticut
- Resting place: Lakeview Cemetery, New Canaan, Connecticut
- Spouse: Elizabeth Stratton (m. Nov. 26, 1765) Dinah Comstock (m. June 28, 1792)

Military service
- Battles/wars: American Revolutionary War

Samuel Cook Silliman (also Samuel Cook Syllyman) (November 12, 1742 – February 14, 1795) was a member of the Connecticut House of Representatives from Norwalk. He served several non-consecutive terms starting in 1779 and ending in 1794.

He was a member of the Connecticut House of Representatives in all of the following sessions:

- May 1779
- May 1780, October 1780
- October 1781, May 1782
- May 1783, October 1783
- October 1784, May 1785, October 1785
- October 1786, May 1787, October 1787
- October 1788, May 1789, October 1789
- May 1791
- May 1792, October 1792
- May 1794, October 1794

== Constitutional delegate ==
On November 12, 1787, the inhabitants of the town of Norwalk had a town meeting with Colonel Thomas Fitch as moderator. Silliman and Hezekiah Rogers were chosen as delegates to meet in a convention at Hartford, following January to ratify the United States Constitution. Connecticut ratified the Constitution on January 8, 1788, making it the fifth state to do so.

Preceded by Thomas Belden; Samuel Comstock	Member of the Connecticut House of Representatives from Norwalk; 1794–1795; With: Taylor Sherman, Eliphalet Lockwood	Succeeded by Taylor Sherman; Eliphalet Lockwood
Preceded by ? ?	Member of the Connecticut House of Representatives from Norwalk; 1792–1793; With: Job Bartram, Samuel Comstock	Succeeded by Thomas Belden; Samuel Comstock
Preceded by Eliphalet Lockwood; Job Bartram	Member of the Connecticut House of Representatives from Norwalk; 1791; With: Eliphalet Lockwood	Succeeded by ? ?
Preceded by ? ?	Member of the Connecticut House of Representatives from Norwalk; 1788–1790; With: Thomas Belden, Thaddeus Betts	Succeeded by Eliphalet Lockwood; Job Bartram
Preceded by Thaddeus Betts; Hezekiah Rogers	Member of the Connecticut House of Representatives from Norwalk; 1786–1788; With: Eliphalet Lockwood, Thomas Belden, Hezekiah Rogers	Succeeded by ? ?
Preceded by Thaddeus Betts; Stephen St. John	Member of the Connecticut House of Representatives from Norwalk; 1784–1786; With: Stephen St. John, Thaddeus Betts	Succeeded by Thaddeus Betts; Hezekiah Rogers
Preceded by Stephen St. John; James Richards	Member of the Connecticut House of Representatives from Norwalk; 1783–1784; With: Stephen St. John, Clapp Raymond	Succeeded by Stephen St. John; Thaddeus Betts
Preceded by Stephen St. John; Matthew Mead	Member of the Connecticut House of Representatives from Norwalk; 1781–1782; With: Stephen St. John, Eliphalet Lockwood	Succeeded by Stephen St. John; James Richards
Preceded by Stephen St. John; Matthew Mead	Member of the Connecticut House of Representatives from Norwalk; 1780–1781; With: Stephen St. John	Succeeded by Stephen St. John; Matthew Mead
Preceded by Stephen St. John; Clapp Raymond	Member of the Connecticut House of Representatives from Norwalk; 1779; With: Matthew Mead	Succeeded by Clapp Raymond; James Richards
