= Job Bartram =

American politician

Member of the Connecticut House of Representatives from Norwalk
- In office May 1790 – May 1791 Serving with Eliphalet Lockwood
- Preceded by: Samuel Cook Silliman, Thomas Belden
- Succeeded by: Samuel Cook Silliman; Eliphalet Lockwood

Personal details
- Born: March 20, 1735 Fairfield, Connecticut Colony
- Died: October 28, 1817 (aged 82) Black Rock Harbor, Connecticut, US
- Spouse(s): Jerusha Thompson (m. November 18, 1762; d. November 23, 1773), Abigail Starr (m. November 7, 1774), Elizabeth Scudder (m. August 27, 1776)

Military service
- Branch/service: Connecticut Militia
- Rank: Captain
- Unit: Fifth Regiment
- Battles/wars: American Revolutionary War • Burning of Fairfield

Job Bartram (March 20, 1735 – October 28, 1817) was a member of the Connecticut House of Representatives from Norwalk in the sessions of May and October 1790. He served as a captain of the Connecticut Militia in the American Revolutionary War.

== Family and early life ==
Bartram was born in Fairfield, Connecticut Colony, on March 20, 1735. He married Jerusha Thompson on November 18, 1762. She died on November 23, 1773. Bartram next married Abigail Starr on November 7, 1774. They had one son Daniel Starr Bartram, born 1775. He next married Elizabeth Scudder on August 27, 1776.

== Revolutionary War service ==
Bartram was in command of a company in Connecticut's Fifth Regiment under Colonel Samuel Whiting in 1777. He was wounded in Fairfield, in 1779.

== Death ==
Job Bartram was drowned along with Stephen Morehouse off Black Rock Harbor, adjacent to Bridgeport.

Preceded by Samuel Cook Silliman; Thomas Belden	Member of the Connecticut House of Representatives from Norwalk; May 1790 – May 1791; With: Eliphalet Lockwood	Succeeded by Eliphalet Lockwood; Samuel Cook Silliman
