= James Richards (politician) =

American politician

Member of the Connecticut House of Representatives from Norwalk
- In office October 1779 – May 1780 Serving with Clapp Raymond
- Preceded by: Clapp Raymond, Stephen St. John
- Succeeded by: Stephen St. John, Samuel Cook Silliman
- In office October 1782 – May 1780 Serving with Stephen St. John
- Preceded by: Stephen St. John, Samuel Cook Silliman
- Succeeded by: Samuel Cook Silliman; Stephen St. John

Personal details
- Born: October 29, 1723 Norwalk, Connecticut
- Died: May 17, 1810 (aged 86) New Canaan, Connecticut, US
- Spouse(s): Hannah Warren, Ruth Hanford, Hannah Close
- Occupation: clerk

Military service
- Rank: Captain
- Unit: Connecticut Militia
- Battles/wars: American Revolutionary War • Battle of Norwalk • Invasion of Danbury

James Richards (October 29, 1723 – May 17, 1810) was a member of the Connecticut House of Representatives from Norwalk in the sessions of October 1779, and October 1782. He served as a captain in the Connecticut Militia during the American Revolutionary War.

He was the son of Samuel Richards and Elizabeth Latham.

He began life as a clerk, becoming afterward a soldier and sailor. He was present, in arms, at the Battle of Norwalk, and the Invasion of Danbury.

Richards' wife Ruth Hanford, was a daughter of Samuel Hanford, a granddaughter of Eleazer Hanford, and a great-granddaughter of Rev. Thomas Hanford, of Norwalk. Ruth Hanford's mother was a daughter of Moses Comstock.

Preceded by Clapp Raymond; Stephen St. John	Member of the Connecticut House of Representatives from Norwalk; October 1779 – May 1780; With: Clapp Raymond	Succeeded by Stephen St. John; Samuel Cook Silliman
Preceded by Stephen St. John; Samuel Cook Silliman	Member of the Connecticut House of Representatives from Norwalk; October 1782 – May 1783; With: Stephen St. John	Succeeded by Samuel Cook Silliman; Stephen St. John
