= Matthew Mead =

Matthew Mead may refer to:

- Matthew Mead (poet) (born 1924), English poet
- Matthew Mead (politician) (1736–1816), member of the Connecticut House of Representatives
- Matthew Mead (minister) (1630–1699), English Independent minister
- Matt Mead (born 1962), American politician
