= Daniel Sherman =

Daniel Sherman may refer to:

- Daniel Sherman (songwriter), British songwriter and producer
- Daniel Sherman (judge) (1721–1799), American state legislator and judge from Connecticut
- Daniel Sherman (actor) (born 1970), American actor, appeared in Wendigo
- Daniel Sherman (politician), stood for California's 36th congressional district in the United States House of Representatives elections, 2000
- Daniel Sherman (landowner), believed to own the first cottage on Murray Isle
- Dan Sherman (1890–1955), pitcher for the Chicago Federals baseball team in 1914
