= Taylor Sherman =

American politician

Member of the Connecticut House of Representatives from Norwalk
- In office May 1794 – October 1794 Serving with Samuel Cook Silliman
- Preceded by: Thomas Belden, Samuel Comstock
- Succeeded by: Eliphalet Lockwood, Samuel Cook Silliman
- In office May 1795 – October 1795 Serving with Eliphalet Lockwood
- Preceded by: Eliphalet Lockwood, Samuel Cook Silliman
- Succeeded by: Eliphalet Lockwood, Samuel Comstock
- In office May 1796 – October 1796 Serving with Eliphalet Lockwood
- Preceded by: Eliphalet Lockwood, Samuel Comstock
- Succeeded by: Eliphalet Lockwood, Matthew Marvin

Personal details
- Born: September 5, 1758 Woodbury, Connecticut, British America
- Died: May 14, 1815 (aged 56) Norwalk, Connecticut, U.S.
- Spouse(s): Elizabeth Stoddard (m. 1787)
- Children: Charles Robert Sherman, Daniel, Elizabeth
- Parent: Daniel Sherman (father) Mindwell Sherman (née Taylor) (mother)
- Occupation: lawyer, judge

Taylor Sherman (September 5, 1758 – May 14, 1815) was a member of the Connecticut House of Representatives from Norwalk in the sessions of May 1794, May 1795, and May 1796.

Sherman was born in Woodbury, Connecticut, on September 5, 1758. He was the son of Judge Daniel Sherman and Mindwell Taylor Sherman.

He married Elizabeth Stoddard of Woodbury in 1787. After he was admitted to the bar, he moved to Norwalk, where he practiced law.

He was a judge of Probate for the District of Norwalk from the creation of the district in 1802 until his death.

He was appointed collector of Internal Revenue for the Second District of Connecticut by James Madison.

He was appointed Agent to survey land in the Connecticut Western Reserve consisting of a half million acres which was granted to those who suffered losses from the Battle of Norwalk. He acquired a large tract of this land in Sherman Township in Huron County, Ohio, which bears his name.

He was the father of Charles Robert Sherman, justice of the Supreme Court of Ohio, and grandfather of General William Tecumseh Sherman.

The Taylor Sherman House was located at 89 Main Street in Norwalk, and the house's design was studied for the Historic American Buildings Survey by the Library of Congress.

Preceded by Thomas Belden; Samuel Comstock	Member of the Connecticut House of Representatives from Norwalk; May 1794 – October 1794; With: Samuel Cook Silliman	Succeeded by Eliphalet Lockwood; Samuel Cook Silliman
Preceded by Eliphalet Lockwood; Samuel Cook Silliman	Member of the Connecticut House of Representatives from Norwalk; May 1795 – October 1795; With: Eliphalet Lockwood	Succeeded by Eliphalet Lockwood; Samuel Comstock
Preceded by Eliphalet Lockwood; Samuel Comstock	Member of the Connecticut House of Representatives from Norwalk; May 1796 – October 1796; With: Eliphalet Lockwood	Succeeded by Eliphalet Lockwood; Matthew Marvin
