= Daniel Sherman (judge) =

American judge and politician

Daniel Sherman (October 14, 1721 in Connecticut – July 28, 1799) was an American state legislator and judge from Connecticut. He sat in the Connecticut General Assembly for 30 years.

== Personal life ==
Sherman married Mindwell Taylor on February 14, 1744, in Danbury, Fairfield County, Connecticut. Born on September 5, 1758, their son was the Judge Taylor Sherman, who was a lawyer and judge in Norwalk, Connecticut.

== Legacy ==
Sherman had many prominent descendants, including:

- his son, judge Taylor Sherman;
- Ohio Supreme Court judge Charles Robert Sherman, who was his grandson;
- United States Senator John Sherman, United States Civil War general William Tecumseh Sherman, Federal judge Charles Taylor Sherman, and businessman Hoyt Sherman, all of whom were his great-grandsons;
- Jesuit priest Thomas Ewing Sherman, a great-great-grandson.
