= Eliphalet Lockwood =

American politician

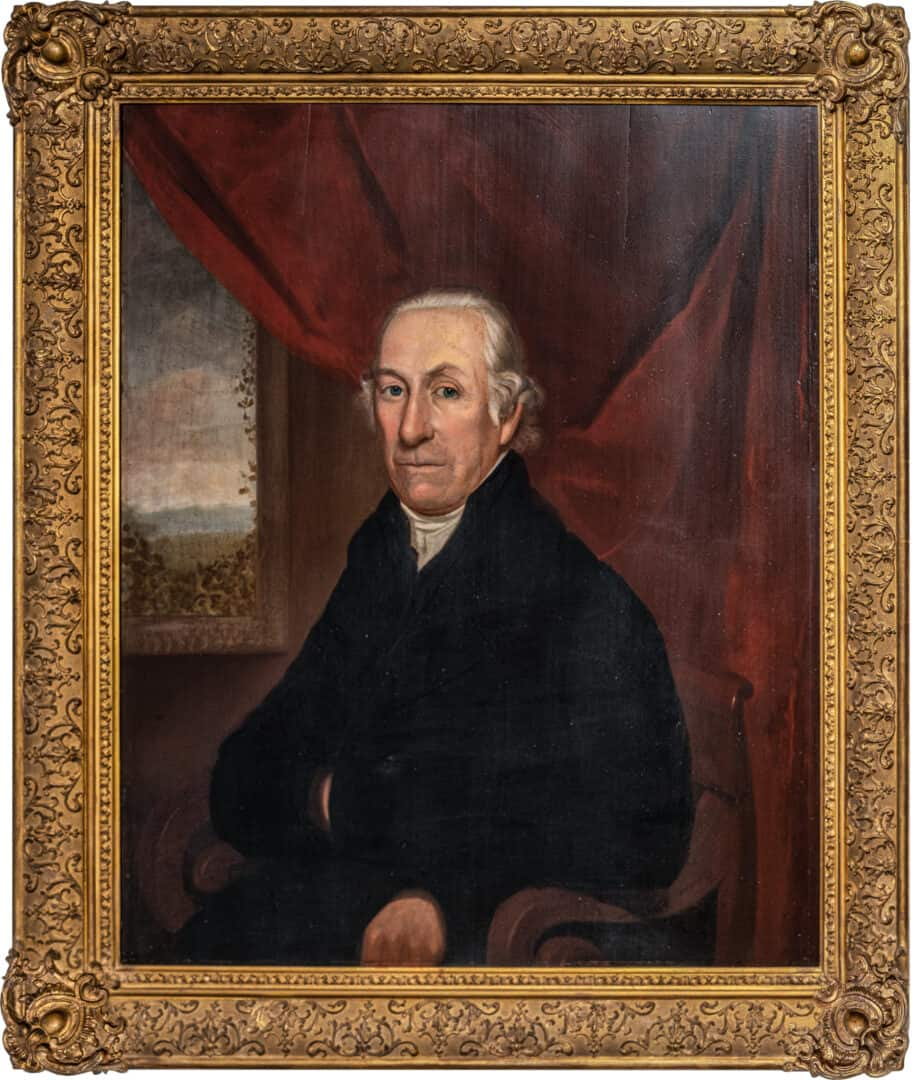
- portrait attributed to Ezra Bisbee, c. 1842

Member of the Connecticut House of Representatives from Norwalk
- In office May 1790 – May 1792 Serving with Job Bartram, Samuel Cook Silliman
- Preceded by: Samuel Cook Silliman, Thomas Belden
- Succeeded by: Samuel Cook Silliman
- In office October 1794 – May 1797 Serving with Taylor Sherman, Samuel Cook Silliman, Samuel Comstock, Matthew Marvin
- Preceded by: Thomas Belden, Samuel Comstock
- Succeeded by: Matthew Marvin; John Cannon

Personal details
- Born: 1741 Norwalk, Connecticut
- Died: 1814 (aged 72–73) Norwalk, Connecticut
- Spouse: Susannah St. John
- Children: Joseph

Military service
- Rank: Captain
- Unit: First Company of Connecticut's Seventh Regiment Commissary of Connecticut's Fifth Regiment Coast Guard
- Battles/wars: American Revolutionary War

Eliphalet Lockwood (October 17, 1741– March 19, 1814) was a nine-term member of the Connecticut House of Representatives from Norwalk in the sessions of May and October 1790, May and October 1791, October 1794, May and October 1795, May and October 1796. He served as a captain in the Connecticut Militia during the American Revolutionary War.

He was the son of Deacon Peter Lockwood and Mary Hawley.

At the beginning of the war, on July 12, 1775, Lockwood enlisted in the First Company of Colonel Charles Webb's Seventh Connecticut Regiment, and was discharged December 24, 1775.

In 1778, he was assistant commissary of issues of the Fifth Regiment.

On July 21, 1778, he gave his bond for $5000 as security to Henry Laurens, Esq., President of the Continental Congress or his successor in office, for faithfully executing the office and trust of an Assistant Commissary of Issues in the American Army.

Lockwood organized the first voluntary fire department in Norwalk. His home was one of those lost when the British burned Norwalk.

In 1780 captain of the coast guards.

| Preceded by Samuel Cook Silliman; Thomas Belden | Member of the Connecticut House of Representatives from Norwalk; May 1790 – May 1792; With: Job Bartram, Samuel Cook Silliman | Succeeded by Samuel Cook Silliman |
| Preceded by Thomas Belden; Samuel Comstock | Member of the Connecticut House of Representatives from Norwalk; October 1794 – May 1797; With: Taylor Sherman, Samuel Cook Silliman, Samuel Comstock, Matthew Marvin | Succeeded by Matthew Marvin; John Cannon |
