= Lieutenant-fireworker =

Lieutenant-fireworker was an officer rank in the British Royal Artillery, ranking below second lieutenant.

After the first lieutenant and second lieutenant, the junior lieutenants of a company of artillery were designated "lieutenants and fireworkers", the conjunction soon being dropped.

The rank was abolished in the Royal Artillery in 1771 and in the Royal Irish Artillery in 1774.
