= Stephen Moylan =

Irish-American leader during the American Revolutionary War

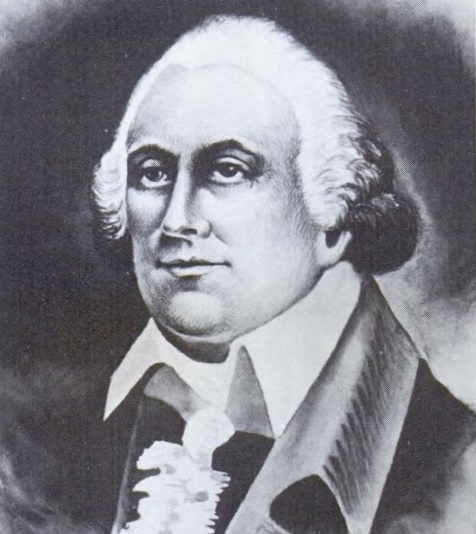
- From Volume 3 of 1962's Quartermaster Support of the Army: A History of the Corps, 1775-1939
- Born: 1737; Cork, Kingdom of Ireland
- Died: April 11, 1811 (aged 73–74) Philadelphia, Pennsylvania, U.S.
- Buried: St. Mary's Roman Catholic Church in Philadelphia
- Allegiance: United States
- Service: Continental Army
- Service years: 1775–1783
- Rank: Brigadier General (Brevet)
- Commands: Muster Master General of the Continental Army; 4th Continental Light Dragoons; Quartermaster General of the Continental Army; Continental Army Cavalry
- Known for: First known use of phrase "United States of America"
- Wars: American Revolutionary War
- Spouse: Mary Ricketts Van Horne

Stephen Moylan (1737 – April 11, 1811) was an Irish-American patriot leader during the American Revolutionary War. He had several positions in the Continental Army, including Muster-Master General, Secretary and Aide to General George Washington, 2nd Quartermaster General, Commander of the Fourth Continental Light Dragoons, and Commander of the Cavalry of the Continental Army.

In January 1776, he wrote a letter using the term "United States of America", the earliest known use of that phrase.

== Early life ==
Moylan was born to a Catholic family in Cork, Kingdom of Ireland in 1737. His father, John Moylan, a well-to-do merchant of Shandon. Stephen's older brother Francis became Bishop of Cork. His family sent him to be educated in Paris. Moylan then worked in Lisbon for three years in the family shipping firm. He settled in Philadelphia in 1768 to organize his own firm. He was one of the organizers of the Friendly Sons of St. Patrick, an Irish-American fraternal organization, and served as its first president.

== American Revolution ==
Moylan joined the American Continental Army in 1775 and upon the recommendation of John Dickinson, was appointed Muster-Master General on August 11, 1775. His brother John, acted during the war as United States Clothier General. Stephen Moylan's experience in the shipping industry afforded the United States a well qualified ship outfitter, who would help fit out the first ships of the Continental Navy. On March 5, 1776, he became secretary to General George Washington with the rank of lieutenant colonel. He was appointed Quartermaster General in the American Continental Army on June 5, 1776, succeeding Thomas Mifflin. He resigned from this office on September 28, 1776. However, he continued to serve as a volunteer in General Washington's staff through December 1776.

He then raised a troop of light dragoons, the 4th Continental Light Dragoons, also known as Moylan's Horse, on January 3, 1777, at Philadelphia. The regiment would be noted for taking the field in captured British uniforms. They engaged in military action at the Battle of Brandywine on September 11, 1777, and then at the Battle of Germantown on October 4, 1777. By the end of 1777, they were engaged in defending the cantonment at Valley Forge. Col. Moylan succeeded General Pulaski as Commander of the Cavalry in March 1778. Moylan's Horse would see action at the Battle of Monmouth on June 28, 1778.

In the campaign of 1779, Moylan and the 4th Dragoons were stationed at Pound Ridge, New York, and saw military action at the Battle of Norwalk on July 11, 1779. Col. Moylan and the 4th Dragoons took part in the Battle of Springfield in New Jersey, on June 23, 1780, and General Anthony Wayne's expedition at Bull's Ferry, New Jersey, on July 20, 1780. Col. Moylan commanded his Dragoons at the Siege of Yorktown in October 1781, after which he was to take the cavalry to the Southern Campaign. However, his failing health caused him to leave the field and return to Philadelphia, where he constantly appealed to the Continental Congress to man, equip and maintain the Continental Dragoon Regiments.

He was rewarded for his service by being breveted to brigadier general on November 3, 1783.

== Personal life ==
Moylan married Mary Ricketts Van Horne on September 12, 1778, and they had two daughters, Elizabeth Catherine and Maria. Their two sons died as children. Moylan died on April 11, 1811, in Philadelphia, and is buried there in St. Mary's Churchyard.

== See also ==
- Van Horne House, Moylan's father-in-law
