= Matthew Mead (politician) =

American politician

Member of the Connecticut House of Representatives from Norwalk
- In office May 1779 – October 1779 Serving with Samuel Cook Silliman
- Preceded by: Stephen St. John, Clapp Raymond
- Succeeded by: James Richards, Clapp Raymond
- In office May 1780 – May 1782 Serving with Stephen St. John
- Preceded by: James Richards, Clapp Raymond
- Succeeded by: Stephen St. John, Samuel Cook Silliman

Personal details
- Born: August 20, 1736 Norwalk, Connecticut
- Died: February 26, 1816 (aged 79) Wilton, Connecticut
- Spouse: Phebe Whelpey
- Children: Mary, Thaddeus, Joseph, Elizabeth, Lucy, David, Matthew, James, Aaron, Xenophon, Roswell, Sallie

Military service
- Branch/service: Connecticut Militia; Continental Army
- Rank: Lieutenant Colonel
- Unit: Ninth Regiment, Fourth Brigade, Connecticut Militia
- Commands: Eighth Regiment of Connecticut; Fifth Regiment of Connecticut
- Battles/wars: French and Indian War • Battle of Ticonderoga; American Revolutionary War • Battle of Germantown

Matthew Mead (August 20, 1736 – February 26, 1816) was a Lieutenant Colonel who served on George Washington's staff in the American Revolutionary War. He was a member of the Connecticut House of Representatives from Norwalk in the sessions of May 1779, May and October 1780, May and October 1781.

== Early life and family ==
He was born on August 20, 1736, in Norwalk. He was the son of Jeremiah Mead and Hannah St. John.

Mead enlisted in the army on September 8, 1755, as a private in Captain Samuel Hanford's Company, French and Indian War. In 1758 he was Quartermaster of the 4th Regiment in the expedition against Crown Point and Ticonderoga.

He married Phebe Whelpey on February 7, 1759, in Wilton.

In 1773 he was commissioned Captain of the Wilton company in the Norwalk, Connecticut Militia. At the outbreak of the Revolution he was commissioned Captain of the 5th Regiment of Connecticut, Continental Line. In 1777 he was made Lieutenant Colonel of the 5th Regiment. In that year he was in the Battle of Germantown, Philadelphia. He commanded the 8th Regiment of Connecticut, Continental Line, at Valley Forge. He resigned his commission on 25 May 1778 after the winter of 1777-78 at Valley Forge, where he was quartered with his Regiment and was on the staff of General Washington.

He served as a member of the Connecticut House of Representatives from Norwalk in the sessions of May 1779, May and October 1780, and May and October 1781.

Preceded by Stephen St. John; Clapp Raymond	Member of the Connecticut House of Representatives from Norwalk; May 1779 – October 1779; With: Samuel Cook Silliman	Succeeded by James Richards; Clapp Raymond
Preceded by James Richards; Clapp Raymond	Member of the Connecticut House of Representatives from Norwalk; May 1780 – May 1782; With: Stephen St. John	Succeeded by Stephen St. John; Samuel Cook Silliman
