= 4th Continental Light Dragoons =

4th Continental Light Dragoons 4th Legionary Corps
- Active: 5 January 1777-15 November 1783
- Allegiance: Continental Congress of the United States
- Type: Dragoon
- Size: regiment of six troops 116 men in 1781
- Part of: Continental Army
- Nickname: Moylan's Horse
- Colors: scarlet coats faced with blue (1777) green coats faced red (1778) blue coats faced red (1782)
- Engagements: Battle of Norwalk, Battle of Brandywine, Battle of Germantown, Battle of Guilford Court House, Siege of Yorktown.

The 4th Continental Light Dragoons, also known as Moylan's Horse, was raised on January 5, 1777, at Philadelphia, Pennsylvania, for service with the Continental Army under Colonel Stephen Moylan. The regiment was known for taking the field in captured British scarlet coats, as noted in a letter from George Washington to Colonel Moylan dated May 12, 1777, in which Moylan was directed to have his uniforms dyed to avoid confusion with British dragoons. The regiment changed to green coats faced in red during the summer of 1778, with Tarleton helmets (black leather helmets in the style associated with Banastre Tarleton).

The regiment saw action at the Battle of Brandywine and the Battle of Germantown in their scarlet uniforms, and at the Battle of Guilford Court House and the Siege of Yorktown in their more familiar green coats. The regiment was furloughed on June 11, 1783, at Philadelphia and disbanded on November 15, 1783.
