= Hiram V. Willson =

American judge

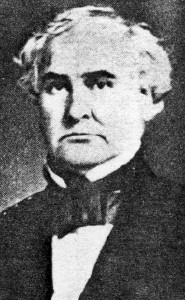

Judge of the United States District Court for the Northern District of Ohio
- In office February 20, 1855 – November 11, 1866
- Appointed by: Franklin Pierce
- Preceded by: Seat established by 10 Stat. 604
- Succeeded by: Charles Taylor Sherman

Personal details
- Born: Hiram V. Willson; April 1808 Madison County, New York, U.S.
- Died: November 11, 1866 (aged 58) Cleveland, Ohio, U.S.
- Party: Democratic
- Education: Hamilton College read law
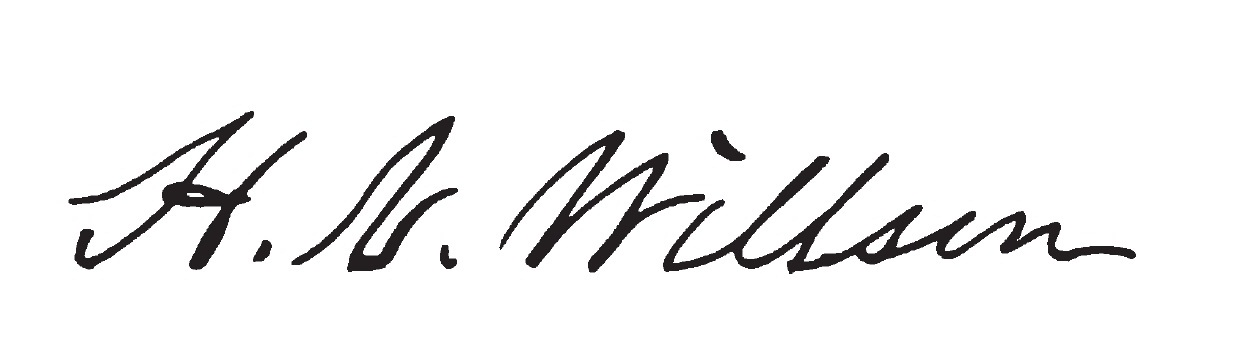
- Signature

Hiram V. Willson (April 1808 – November 11, 1866) was a United States district judge of the United States District Court for the Northern District of Ohio.

== Education and career ==
Born in April 1808, in Madison County, New York, Willson graduated from Hamilton College in 1832 and read law, first in the office of Jared Willson of Canandaigua, New York, then in the office of Francis Scott Key in Washington, D.C. After moving to Painesville, Ohio in 1833, he was admitted to the bar and entered private practice with Henry B. Payne in Cleveland, Ohio from 1834 to 1855. In 1852, Willson was nominated by the Democratic Party for United States House of Representatives, but lost to his law partner Edward Wade of the Free Soil Party. In 1854, the Cleveland Bar Association sent Willson to lobby Congress to divide the state of Ohio into two Federal Judicial Districts. The effort was successful.

== Federal judicial service ==
Willson was nominated by President Franklin Pierce on February 10, 1855, to the United States District Court for the Northern District of Ohio, to a new seat authorized by 10 Stat. 604. He was confirmed by the United States Senate on February 20, 1855, and received his commission the same day. His service terminated on November 11, 1866, due to his death of consumption (tuberculosis) in Cleveland. Some months before his death, he was received into the First Presbyterian Church.

=== Notable case ===
Willson's most notable case was the trial of the Oberlin–Wellington Rescue conspirators in 1858.

== Sources ==
Legal offices
Preceded by Seat established by 10 Stat. 604	Judge of the United States District Court for the Northern District of Ohio; 1855–1866	Succeeded by Charles Taylor Sherman
