= Stephen St. John =

American politician

Member of the Connecticut House of Representatives from Norwalk

Personal details
- Born: 1735
- Died: May 9, 1785 Norwalk, Connecticut
- Spouse(s): Ann Fitch (daughter of Samuel Fitch, m. December 9, 1757)
- Children: Stephen, Sarah, William, Susannah, Nancy

Military service
- Rank: Lieutenant Colonel
- Unit: Ninth Connecticut Regiment

Stephen St. John (1735 – May 9, 1785) was a member of the Connecticut House of Representatives from Norwalk in the sessions of May and October 1778, May and October 1780, May 1781, May and October 1782, May 1783, May and October 1784, and May 1785.

He was the son of Joseph St. John, and Susannah Selleck.

Preceded by Samuel Cook Silliman; Clapp Raymond	Member of the Connecticut House of Representatives from Norwalk; May 1784, October 1784, May 1785; With: Thaddeus Betts, Samuel Cook Silliman	Succeeded by Samuel Cook Silliman; Thaddeus Betts
Preceded by Samuel Cook Silliman; Eliphalet Lockwood	Member of the Connecticut House of Representatives from Norwalk; May 1782, October 1782, May 1783; With: Samuel Cook Silliman, James Richards	Succeeded by Samuel Cook Silliman; Clapp Raymond
Preceded by Clapp Raymond; James Richards	Member of the Connecticut House of Representatives from Norwalk; May 1780, October 1780, May 1781; With: Samuel Cook Silliman, Matthew Mead	Succeeded by Samuel Cook Silliman; Eliphalet Lockwood
Preceded by Samuel Cook Silliman	Member of the Connecticut House of Representatives from Norwalk; May 1778, October 1778; With: Clapp Raymond	Succeeded by Samuel Cook Silliman; Matthew Mead
