= Clapp Raymond =

American politician

Member of the Connecticut House of Representatives from Norwalk
- In office May 1778 – May 1779 Serving with Stephen St. John
- Preceded by: Samuel Cook Silliman
- Succeeded by: Matthew Mead; Samuel Cook Silliman
- In office October 1779 – May 1780 Serving with James Richards
- Preceded by: Samuel Cook Silliman; Matthew Mead
- Succeeded by: Stephen St. John; Matthew Mead
- In office October 1783 – May 1784
- Preceded by: Stephen St. John
- Succeeded by: Stephen St. John; Thaddeus Betts

Personal details
- Born: June 20, 1732 Norwalk, Connecticut
- Died: 1795 Balston Spa, New York
- Spouse: Rebecca Betts
- Children: Asahel, Hannah, Rebecca, Clapp

Military service
- Allegiance: United States
- Branch/service: Connecticut Militia of Wilton
- Rank: Captain
- Battles/wars: American Revolutionary War

Clapp Raymond (June 20, 1732 – 1795) was a member of the Connecticut House of Representatives from Norwalk in the sessions of May and October 1778, October 1779, and October 1783.

== Early life ==
He was born June 20, 1732.

In February 1775, he was appointed to a committee for the inspection of fire-arms. In 1780 was on a committee constituted by the Legislature to run a line for the boundary of a religious society.

== Family life ==
He married Rebecca Betts on August 4, 1757. He had four children: Rebecca, Hannah, Asahel, and Clapp.

== Death ==
Clapp Raymond died in 1795 in Ballston Spa, New York, and was buried in there.

== See also ==
- Sloan-Raymond-Fitch House

Preceded by Stephen St. John	Member of the Connecticut House of Representatives from Norwalk; October 1883	Succeeded by Stephen St. John; Thaddeus Betts
Preceded by Samuel Cook Silliman; Matthew Mead	Member of the Connecticut House of Representatives from Norwalk; October 1779; With: James Richards	Succeeded by Stephen St. John; Matthew Mead
Preceded by Samuel Cook Silliman	Member of the Connecticut House of Representatives from Norwalk; May and October 1778; With: Stephen St. John	Succeeded by Matthew Mead; Samuel Cook Silliman
