= Charles Sherman (artist) =

American artist (born 1947)

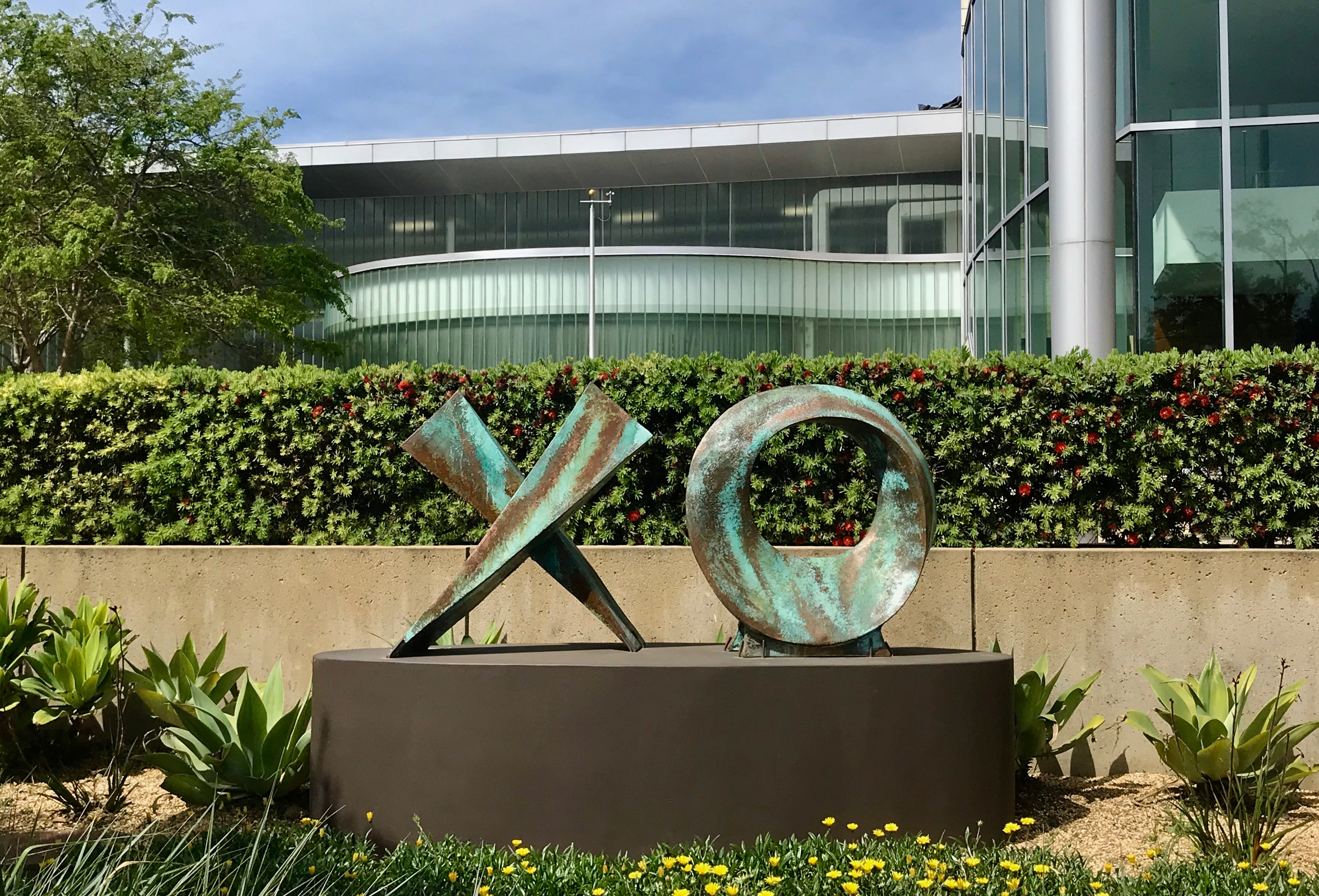
- Love Letters (2018) ceramic, copper and oxide patina, 40" x 80" x 12" City of Beverly Hills Department of Public Works, Beverly Hills, California
- Born: 1947 (age 78–79); Atlantic City, New Jersey
- Known for: Sculpture
- Website: www.charlesshermanart.com

Charles Sherman (born 1947) is an American artist best known for his continuum sculptures based on a three-dimensional form of the Möbius strip. Sherman’s work is included in museum and public collections, such as the San Diego Museum of Art, the Mobile Museum of Art, and the Golda Meir Center for Political Leadership at Metropolitan State University of Denver. His work has been shown in solo and group exhibitions in the United States and Asia. His sculpture and jewelry designs have appeared in contemporary design and architectural publications. Serenity (2006), part of his monumental ceramic Infinity Ring body of work, is installed lakeside at the Fountain Park Sculpture Garden in Fountain Hills, Arizona, and also in the front of the John Entenza House in Santa Monica, California, a precursor to the Case Study Houses.

== Early work: The Spiritual in Art and the Goddess ==
Sherman’s early-career paintings, drawings, and prints were of flowers. He closely observed and recorded their transformation from life to death. He characterized this exploration as a gateway to his Goddess Series.

In the 1980s, Sherman was a significant artistic interpreter of the Goddess movement that had begun worldwide in the 1970s. Sherman embraced the feminine energy of the goddess as a powerful force, and created a visual language that was inspired by the work of Los Angeles-based Lithuanian archaeologist Marija Gimbutas. Sherman's depictions of goddesses from the Neolithic period and the traditions of ancient Europe were described by Starr Goode as abstracted, fanciful images which sometimes verged on the grotesque. Her interview of Charles Sherman was one of 21 interviews of scholars and artists by Starr Goode for her cable series, The Goddess in Art (1986-1991). The videos are in the permanent collection of the Getty Research Institute in Los Angeles, California.

Sherman exhibited his predominantly black and white acrylic paintings in goddess-themed Los Angeles exhibitions, such as The Goddess in Contemporary Art exhibition of 1988, curated by Nancy Ann Jones at the Social and Public Art Resource Center in Venice, California. His paintings have been published in books about the goddess including The Once and Future Goddess by Elinor Gadon, and as cover art for several print editions of the poetry journal Sheela-Na-Gig (now online). Sherman also gave gallery talks, and in 1993, a painting workshop, "The Animal Goddesses of Old Europe", at the Craft and Folk Art Museum. Decades later, Jungian archetypes of the feminine are still present in Sherman's oeuvre, but in forms emphasizing beauty, reduced to the Minimalism art form of the Möbius.

== Art and activism ==
Sherman has also used performance art as a vehicle to express strongly held viewpoints and make political statements. During his 1989 tenure as president of the Los Angeles Artists' Equity Association, Sherman assisted artist Tom Van Sant with his Goddess of Democracy project in downtown Los Angeles. The 1000-pound statue was built by Van Sant and members of the Los Angeles Chapter of the Artists' Equity Association in support of the pro-democracy uprising by students in Beijing during the Tiananmen Square protests of 1989. Beijing artists had built a monumental Goddess of Democracy statue that had been destroyed by Chinese troops who stopped the rebellion with what became a bloody massacre. The Los Angeles Goddess of Democracy suffered a similar fate; vandals toppled the statue at its Chinatown location.

In 1990, Sherman collaborated with feminist artist Cheri Gaulke in front of the Los Angeles County Museum of Art for Who’s Burning America? As a criticism of the U.S. government subsidy of tobacco, Sherman designed a large-scale billboard showing the American flag with a cigarette burning a hole through it. He displayed the billboard on the side of a truck parked in front of the museum, while Gaulke, dressed as Senator Jesse Helms, a strong supporter of the tobacco industry, set an American flag on fire with a giant cigarette.

== The Bible Series ==
In the early 1990s, Sherman began work on a series of bronze sculptures, drawings and prints, to give visual interpretation to the “…complexity and deep humanity of biblical characters.” His study of the Old Testament Bible resulted in a personal, mystical visualization of a rich biblical past and our developing mythology. He expressed his interpretation of the Bible not only through art, but also by lectures at art galleries and Jewish temples. His Kabbalah Mandala motif first appeared in 1993 as an illustration in the book God, Sex and Kabbalah by Rabbi Allen S. Maller.

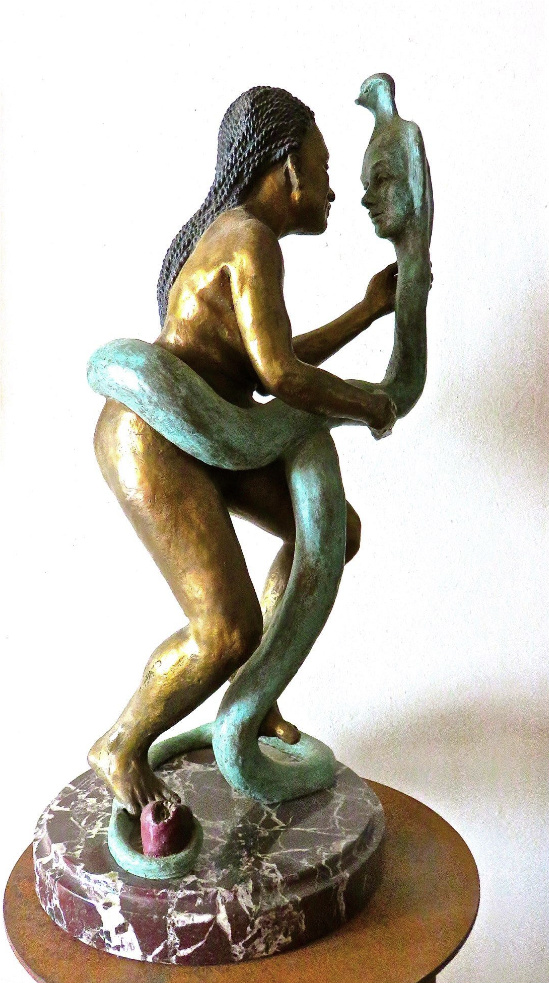
The Two Faces of Eve (1996), bronze, The Bible Series

In the introduction to his catalogue, “The Bible Series” (1998), Sherman wrote that he intended this body of work to deal with “…issues of gender, spirit, and the Divine.” His bronze sculpture The Two Faces of Eve (1996) depicts a nude Eve embraced by and gazing into the eyes of a female-faced serpent, a mirror image of herself. The subjects of his bronze sculptures from this period range from the depiction of traditional Bible stories, such as his wall sculpture Jacob and Esau Wrestling in the Womb (1996), to the contemporary subject of The Warrior (1994), an homage to Deena Metzger, writer, teacher, counselor, and breast cancer survivor. The end of the century would find Sherman creating Golda (1999), a monumental bronze portrait head of Israeli teacher and fourth Prime Minister of Israel, Golda Meir. The sculpture would be installed in the new millennium at the Golda Meir Center for Political Leadership at the Metropolitan State University of Denver. Sherman was invited to give a lecture at the center.

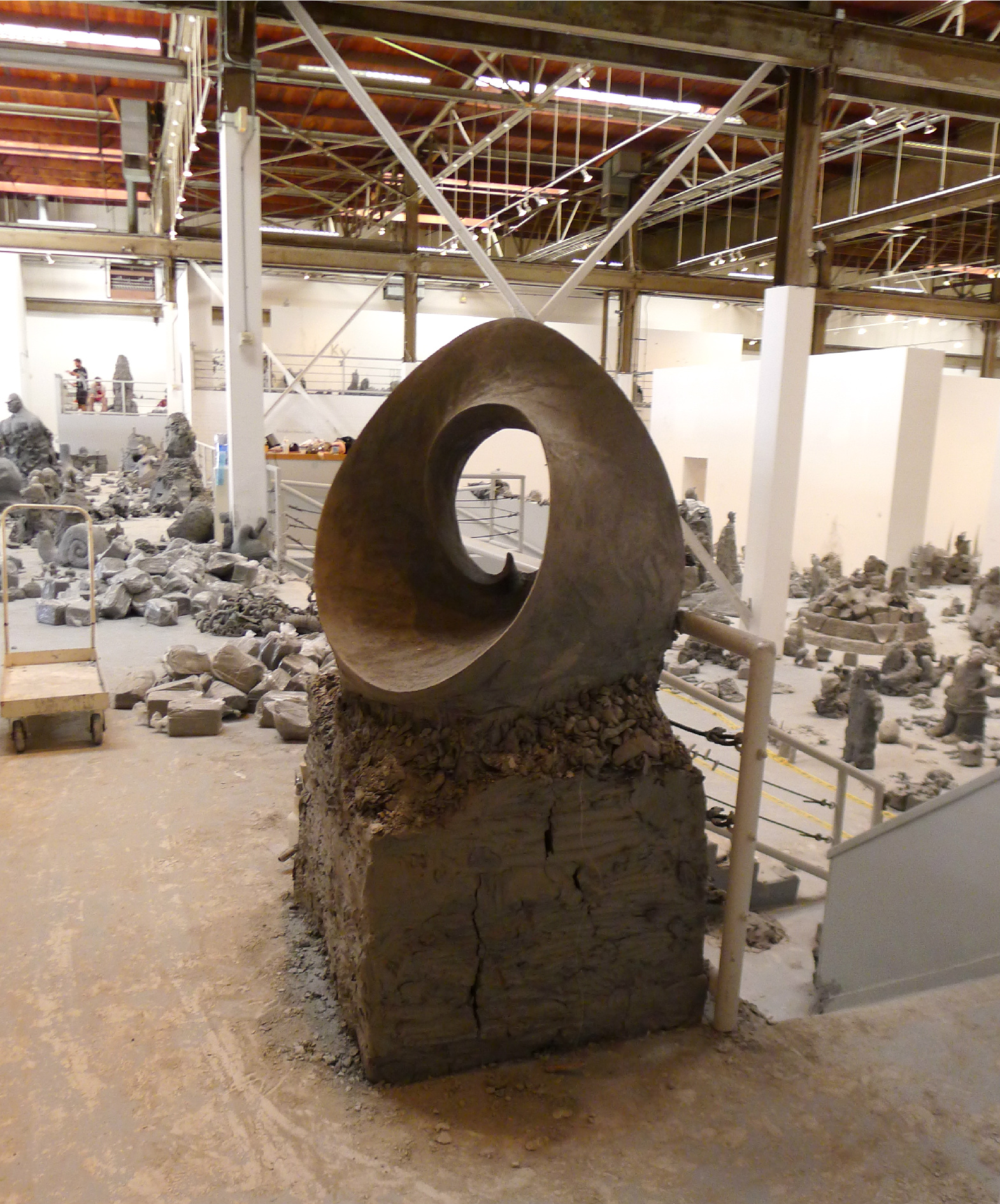
Continuum (2013) Greenware, Geffen Contemporary, Museum of Contemporary Art, Los Angeles, California

== The Infinity Ring: Sculpture and Jewelry Design ==
Along with his figurative work, Sherman had been concurrently creating abstract and organic sculpture, and in 2002 began investigating circular forms he called Infinity Rings, based on a three-dimensional form of the Möbius strip. This new body of work was a technical challenge; he first had to find a way to build monumental sculptures from clay that would withstand the tendency to collapse during high temperature kiln firing. He has continued to explore the infinity ring form in diverse materials, and also combined rings to create multiple ring sculptures.

Sherman began to incise words into his clay infinity ring sculptures, philosophical manifestos such as, God is a Verb, Art is a Verb, and Love is a Verb, or verse fragments from the Bible, such as “I am to my Beloved as my Beloved is Mine” in either English or Hebrew. Sherman’s ceramic infinity ring sculpture, God is a Verb was in the 2007 Dead Sea Scrolls exhibition at the San Diego Natural History Museum. Sherman has created infinity rings from various media, including bronze, stainless steel, Lucite, aluminum, and glass mosaic, but prefers the mobility of clay. "If I could make one statement about art, it’s that the essence of art is that it's a verb, not a noun. It´s a process, and when you fully understand that, you let the art take its own course. Even clay has a life of its own and knows where it wants to go and I try to facilitate that."

Sherman has written that it is his intention to express universal spiritual values with his sculpture. This emphasis on spirituality is especially a feature of Sherman’s later work in symbolic jewelry design. Sherman’s jewelry designs are sculptures in miniature of his larger works. He has said that these designs are based upon “sacred geometry.” Some are symbols from world religions, such as Christianity, Judaism, and Hinduism. Sherman has received numerous awards for his sculpture, including First Place at the 1989 Los Angeles All City Art Open, juried by Henry Hopkins and Merry Norris. He was awarded First Place in Inspirational Design in an international design competition, the 2012 JCK Jeweler’s Choice Awards for his Trinity Cross pendant, and in 2014, the Jewelers of America association selected Sherman as one of ten new jewelry designers to debut their collections at the professional organization’s JA New York Summer Show.
