= Thomas Belden =

American politician (1731–1806)

Member of the Connecticut House of Representatives from Norwalk
- In office October 1768 – May 1775 Serving with Thomas Fitch, V, Joseph Platt, Uriah Rogers, Thaddeus Betts
- Preceded by: Asa Spalding
- Succeeded by: Thomas Fitch, V, Thaddeus Betts
- In office May 1787 – October 1787 Serving with Samuel Cook Silliman
- Preceded by: Samuel Cook Silliman
- Succeeded by: Samuel Cook Silliman, Hezekiah Rogers
- In office May 1788 – May 1789 Serving with Samuel Cook Silliman
- Preceded by: Samuel Cook Silliman, Hezekiah Rogers
- Succeeded by: Samuel Cook Silliman
- In office May 1793 – May 1794 Serving with Samuel Comstock
- Preceded by: Samuel Comstock, Samuel Cook Silliman
- Succeeded by: Samuel Cook Silliman, Taylor Sherman

Personal details
- Born: March 25, 1731 Norwalk, Connecticut
- Died: 1806
- Education: Yale College (1751)

Thomas Belden (before 1793 Thomas Belding) (March 25, 1731 – 1806) was a member of the Connecticut House of Representatives from Norwalk for twelve years, including the sessions of October 1768, May and October 1769, May and October 1770, May and October 1771, May and October 1772, May and October 1773, May and October 1774, May 1775, May 1787, May and October 1778, October 1789, May and October 1793.

== Biography ==
Belden was born in Norwalk on March 25, 1731. He was the son of John Belden and Ruhamar Hill, the daughter of Captain John Hill, of Westerly, Rhode Island. He was the grandson of John Belding, early settler, and state representative of Norwalk.

Belden Hill near the Norwalk River in Wilton was named for Thomas Belden.

Preceded by Asa Spalding	Member of the Connecticut House of Representatives from Norwalk; October 1768 – May 1775; With: Thomas Fitch, V, Joseph Platt, Uriah Rogers, Thaddeus Betts	Succeeded by Thaddeus Betts; Thomas Fitch, V
Preceded by Samuel Cook Silliman	Member of the Connecticut House of Representatives from Norwalk; May 1787 – October 1787; With: Samuel Cook Silliman	Succeeded by Samuel Cook Silliman; Hezekiah Rogers
Preceded by Samuel Cook Silliman; Hezekiah Rogers	Member of the Connecticut House of Representatives from Norwalk; May 1788 – May 1789; With: Samuel Cook Silliman	Succeeded by Samuel Cook Silliman
Preceded by Samuel Comstock; Samuel Cook Silliman	Member of the Connecticut House of Representatives from Norwalk; May 1793 – May 1794; With: Samuel Comstock	Succeeded by Samuel Cook Silliman; Taylor Sherman
