= Charles Taylor Sherman =

American judge (1811–1879)

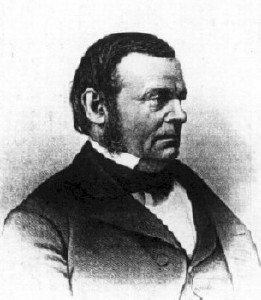

Judge of the United States District Court for the Northern District of Ohio
- In office March 2, 1867 – November 25, 1872
- Appointed by: Andrew Johnson
- Preceded by: Hiram V. Willson
- Succeeded by: Martin Welker

Personal details
- Born: Charles Taylor Sherman; February 3, 1811 Norwalk, Connecticut, U.S.
- Died: January 1, 1879 (aged 67) Cleveland, Ohio, U.S.
- Relations: Nelson A. Miles; Colgate Hoyt; James D. Cameron
- Parent: Charles Robert Sherman (father)
- Relatives: John Sherman; William Tecumseh Sherman
- Education: Ohio University read law

Charles Taylor Sherman (February 3, 1811 – January 1, 1879) was an American district judge of the United States District Court for the Northern District of Ohio.

== Education and career ==
Born on February 3, 1811, in Norwalk, Connecticut, Sherman graduated from Ohio University in 1830, with financial aid from one of his father's friends, after his father died in 1829. He read law in 1833, in the office of Henry Stoddard and under Judge Jacob Parker. He was admitted to the Ohio bar in 1833, and entered private practice in Mansfield, Ohio, from 1835 to 1867, later joined by his brother John. He was a city councilman for Mansfield in 1846. Active in public and business affairs, Sherman contributed money, labor and personal influence to the location and building of the Sandusky, Mansfield and Newark Railroad and the Pittsburgh, Fort Wayne and Chicago Railroad becoming a director of both organizations. When the American Civil War broke out he organized and was chairman of the military committee of his county, and was appointed as commandant of the military camp in Mansfield. Later he was appointed by President Abraham Lincoln as one of the commissioners to settle war claims in St. Louis, Missouri. In 1866, he was selected as one of the first government directors of the Union Pacific Railroad.

== Federal judicial service ==
Sherman was nominated by President Andrew Johnson on March 2, 1867, to a seat on the United States District Court for the Northern District of Ohio vacated by Judge Hiram V. Willson. He was confirmed by the United States Senate on March 2, 1867, and received his commission the same day. His service terminated on November 25, 1872, due to his resignation.

== Later activities ==
After Sherman retired from practicing law, he became interested in the organization of the agricultural society of Richland County, Ohio, and encouraged the "introduction of better modes for the larger production of better quality of fruits."

== Death ==
Sherman died on January 1, 1879, in Cleveland, Ohio.

== Family ==
Sherman was the eldest of thirteen children born to Charles Robert Sherman and his wife, Mary (Hoyt) Sherman. His family emigrated from England to Massachusetts in 1634. His great-grandfather and grandfather both served on the state courts of Connecticut. When Sherman was young, his family moved to Lancaster, Ohio, where his father established a prominent law practice and later became a member of the Ohio Supreme Court. His two younger brothers were John Sherman, United States Senator from Ohio, and William Tecumseh Sherman, Major General of the Union Army. Sherman married Eliza Williams of Dayton, Ohio, on February 2, 1841, and they became the parents of seven children: Mary Hoyt, who became the wife of General Nelson A. Miles, United States Army; Henry Stoddard, who became a Cleveland attorney; John J., who became a United States Marshal in New Mexico; Charles F. Cook who died in infancy; Anna Wallace, who died at the age of 20 in 1870; Eliza A. Williams, who married Colgate Hoyt of Cleveland; and Elizabeth Bancroft, who married James D. Cameron, a United States Senator from Pennsylvania.

== Sources ==
- "Sherman, Charles Taylor - Federal Judicial Center". www.fjc.gov.

Legal offices
Preceded by Hiram V. Willson	Judge of the United States District Court for the Northern District of Ohio; 1867–1872	Succeeded by Martin Welker
