= Charles Robert Sherman =

American judge (1788–1829)

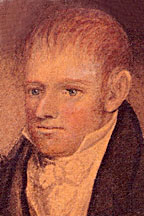

Ohio Supreme Court Judge
- In office January 1823 – June 24, 1829
- Preceded by: John McLean
- Succeeded by: Gustavus Swan

Personal details
- Born: September 26, 1788 Norwalk, Connecticut, U.S.
- Died: June 24, 1829 (aged 40) Lebanon, Ohio, U.S.
- Resting place: Elmwood Cemetery, Lancaster, Ohio
- Spouse: Mary Hoyt
- Children: Charles Taylor Sherman, William Tecumseh Sherman, John Sherman, Hoyt Sherman, seven others
- Parent: Taylor Sherman (father)

Charles Robert Sherman (c. September 26, 1788 – June 24, 1829) was an American lawyer and public servant. Of his 11 children, four became prominent public figures during and after the Civil War.

== Life and career ==
Sherman was born in Norwalk, Connecticut, the son of Taylor Sherman, a judge and state representative. He studied law in the office of a Mr. Chapman in Newtown and was admitted to the bar in 1809. He married Mary Hoyt in 1810 and then moved to Lancaster, Ohio, where he was successful as a lawyer in private practice. In the War of 1812, he served as a major of the Ohio Militia. In 1823 he became a judge in the Ohio Supreme Court, where he continued to serve until his sudden death in 1829. The Supreme Court rode a circuit in those days, and Sherman died while holding court in Lebanon, Ohio, where he was buried. He was later re-interred in Elmwood Cemetery, Lancaster, Ohio.

Judge Sherman left his widow with no means of support and eleven children, the oldest eighteen years of age, the youngest an infant. Among them were US Judge Charles Taylor Sherman and William Tecumseh Sherman, who was sent to live with Judge Sherman's friend Thomas Ewing and his wife Maria, and who would famously serve as a General in the U.S. Army during the American Civil War. Another son was John Sherman, who would become a successful Republican Party politician, U.S. Senator, and Cabinet Secretary. His youngest son, Hoyt Sherman, would also become notable as a military officer, politician, and businessman.

The Sherman family were members of the Presbyterian Church in Lancaster. He was a trustee of Ohio University.
