= Tryon's raid =

British raid in Connecticut during American Revolutionary War

Tryon's Raid occurred in July 1779, during the American Revolutionary War, in which 2700 men, led by British Major General William Tryon, raided the Connecticut ports of New Haven, Fairfield, and Norwalk. They destroyed military and public stores, supply houses, and ships as well as private homes, churches, and other public buildings. The raids were ineffectually resisted by militia forces.

The raid was part of a larger strategy designed by the British commander-in-chief, Lieutenant General Sir Henry Clinton, to draw Major General George Washington's Continental Army to terrain on which it might be more effectively engaged. The strategy failed, and both sides criticized General Tryon for the severity of his action. Although the raid had economic ramifications and affected military supplies, Clinton's efforts had no long-term strategic impact.

== Background ==
Following France's entry into the American Revolutionary War in 1778, British forces in New York City were primarily concerned with defending the city and its harbor. The military activity in the northern states was reduced significantly, and the armies of George Washington and Sir Henry Clinton watched each other warily in the New York area. Washington based his defense in New Jersey and at West Point, where he guarded critical communications and supply links. In 1779, Lieutenant General Clinton hatched a plan that he hoped would convince General Washington to move his army so that he might be engaged in a "general and decisive action". He first launched an expedition in late May that seized Stony Point, New York and Verplanck's Point, opposite sides of a key crossing point over the Hudson River. Although Washington did move additional troops into the New York highlands, Clinton felt the position too strong to attack. He decided to dispatch Major General William Tryon, who organized an expedition to raid the coastal communities of Connecticut. Simultaneously, Clinton staged a body of troops at Mamaroneck, New York, that would go after Washington when he moved troops to oppose the raids, and also attack Continental Army positions in New Jersey.

Tryon assembled a force of 2600 men, and embarked them on a fleet on Long Island Sound commanded by Sir George Collier. One division, led by Brigadier General George Garth, consisted of the 54th Regiment along with several companies of Royal Fusiliers, foot guards, and Hessian jägers. The second division, led by Tryon, consisted of the Hessian Landgrave Regiment, the Royal Welch Fusiliers, and the King's American Regiment, the latter being a provincial regiment of Loyalists raised by Yale College graduate Edmund Fanning.

== New Haven ==
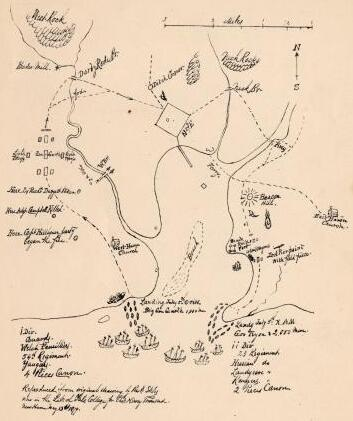
Hand-drawn map by Ezra Stiles showing the British movements at New Haven

The fleet sailed from New York on July 3, and reached New Haven (41°18′36″N 72°55′25″W) two days later. Immediately disembarking, Garth's division rapidly gained control of New Haven, and went to work. Although Tryon had given orders that included burning the town, Garth did not do this; he limited his activities to destroying public stores, and seizing or destroying the town's armaments and ships in the harbor. Tryon's division landed in East Haven, Connecticut, where it met spirited resistance from a band of local militia, but managed to take Black Rock Fort. In addition to destroying barns filled with grain, Tryon had local manor houses put to the torch. By the time the British withdrew, over 1,000 militia had mustered from the surrounding towns.

== Fairfield ==
The expedition reembarked on the fleet on the afternoon of July 6, after spending the night in armed camps. It sailed for Fairfield, Connecticut (41°10′33″N 73°16′19″W), arriving two days later. There the inhabitants fled upon the fleet's arrival. Tryon's force, facing little or no opposition, went on a destructive rampage. In addition to destroying 54 barns and 47 storehouses, they burned 83 homes, two churches, and municipal buildings including a schoolhouse, the courthouse, and the local jail. After another night ashore, the expedition sailed across Long Island Sound, where it spent two days resting and resupplying in Huntington, New York.

== Norwalk ==
The fleet arrived at Norwalk, Connecticut (41°05′38″N 73°25′11″W), late on July 11. The troops did not finish landing until 3:00 am on the 12th, so they rested until daybreak. The two divisions, which had landed on opposite sides of the harbor, were weakly opposed by about 50 local militia, who were easily dispersed. The British forces began their attack of the village, and ultimately destroyed most of its residences and commercial infrastructure. The fleet returned to Huntington, where Tryon received orders to return to New York on July 14.

== Aftermath ==
Tryon reported losses of 26 killed, 90 wounded, and 32 missing. Historian Charles Hervey Townshend compiled a list of 23 Americans killed, 15 wounded, and 12 captured in the New Haven raid; a contemporary news account reported 27 killed and 19 wounded.

General Clinton's plan was an utter failure. General Washington, on hearing of the invasion, immediately ordered the entire Connecticut division, stationed near West Point, to move with all possible speed to counter the invasion. But they arrived after Tryon had sailed, and missed the opportunity to defend their own state. Washington however, may have benefited from Clinton's weakening of the garrison at Stony Point in order to provide men for Tryon's expedition. On the night of July 15–16, a picked force under the command of General Anthony Wayne successfully captured the outpost. Although Clinton reoccupied Stony Point, the failure of the 1779 raids to accomplish anything of substance led him to abandon it later in the year.

Tryon was pilloried by both Patriots and Loyalists for the raid. Washington accused him of making war against women and children, and Silas Deane called the raids acts of "barbarity" and "almost beyond description". John Pownall, a colonial administrator in London, wondered "what could have induced our friend Tryon to countenance [...] the wanton severities". General Clinton insisted on a written report justifying the burnings, and complained of the raiding he had been reduced to ordering, "I have been a buccaneer already too long; I detest that sort of war."

The last raid by the British against the Connecticut coast was conducted by its native son, Benedict Arnold, in 1781, when he attacked the port of New London. A former officer in the Continental Army, he had fled to the British after his plot to turn over West Point to them in 1780 was discovered. He fought with them in the last year of the war, moving to London in 1782.

== See also ==
- American Revolutionary War § Stalemate in the North. Places Tryon's Raid in overall sequence and strategic context.
