= Thomas Fitch V =

American politician

Member of the Connecticut House of Representatives from Norwalk
- In office October 1761 – May 1762 Serving with Peter Lockwood
- Preceded by: Joseph Platt Jr., Samuel Fitch
- Succeeded by: Joseph Platt Jr.
- In office May 1763 – October 1767 Serving with Peter Lockwood, Joseph Platt Jr., Joseph Hall
- Preceded by: Peter Lockwood, Nathaniel Benedict
- Succeeded by: Joseph Platt Jr.
- In office October 1768 – May 1770 Serving with Thomas Belden
- Preceded by: Asa Spalding
- Succeeded by: Joseph Platt Jr., Thomas Belden
- In office October 1770 – May 1771 Serving with Thomas Belden
- Preceded by: Joseph Platt Jr., Thomas Belden
- Succeeded by: Thomas Belden
- In office October 1771 – May 1772 Serving with Thomas Belden
- Preceded by: Thomas Belden
- Succeeded by: Thomas Belden, Uriah Rogers
- In office October 1772 – May 1773 Serving with Thomas Belden
- Preceded by: Thomas Belden, Uriah Rogers
- Succeeded by: Thomas Belden
- In office October 1773 – May 1774 Serving with Thomas Belden
- Preceded by: Thomas Belden
- Succeeded by: Thomas Belden
- In office October 1775 – October 1776 Serving with Thaddeus Betts
- Preceded by: Thomas Belden
- Succeeded by: Thaddeus Betts

Personal details
- Born: 1725 Norwalk, Connecticut Colony
- Died: January 16, 1795 Norwalk, Connecticut
- Resting place: East Norwalk Historical Cemetery, Norwalk, Connecticut
- Spouse: Sarah
- Children: Sarah Fitch St. John (1766 – 1825), Thaddeus Hill Fitch (1775 – 1776)

Military service
- Allegiance: (Kingdom of Great Britain) Great Britain
- Rank: Senior Colonel
- Battles/wars: French and Indian War; Battle of Ticonderoga; American War of Independence; Capture of Fort Ticonderoga

Thomas Fitch V (1725 – January 16, 1795) was a member of the Connecticut House of Representatives from Norwalk in the sessions of October 1761, May and October 1763, May and October 1764, May and October 1765, May and October 1766, May 1767, October 1768, May and October 1769, October 1770, October 1771, October 1772, October 1773, October 1775, and May 1776.

He was the son of Governor Thomas Fitch, IV and Hannah Hall Fitch. He served as an officer in the French and Indian War, primarily in upstate New York, near Fort Crailo. Although he and his troops are widely believed to be the inspiration for the song Yankee Doodle, contemporary scholars now believe that its origins are at least twelve years earlier.

== Yankee Doodle Legend ==
There is a legend that during the French and Indian War, Fitch was the commander of four New England Regiments. Tradition states that Captain Fitch received the song in 1755 as a joke from British surgeon Dr. Richard Shuckburgh, making Fitch the original "Yankee Doodle".

Fitch's grave marker states that he is the inspiration for the song "Yankee Doodle." The marker claims that Captain Fitch had assembled his company of recruits at the Fitch homestead in Norwalk at the beginning of the French and Indian War. His sister Elizabeth was concerned about the recruits' appearance and lack of uniforms, so she presented each man with a chicken feather for their hats that would present the image of uniformity. Their appearance when entering West Albany, with feathers in their hats and unpolished clothing, caused British surgeon Dr. Shuckburgh to write verses mocking Fitch and his men as "Yankee Doodles and Macaronies". However, the sentiment changed to become more favorable after the successful campaigns at Ticonderoga and Crown Point in 1759.

Fitch had the rank of Senior Colonel and was in command of sixteen regiments by the time that he had left the service three years later.

== Life after military service ==
After that conflict, Thomas, V returned to Norwalk. He was a prominent resident during and after the American Revolution. He served as a town councilman. He was, along with Thaddeus Betts, in the first delegation from Norwalk to the Connecticut House of Representatives in 1776. He helped with the reconstruction efforts after the burning of Norwalk in 1779.

He died on January 16, 1795, and was buried in the East Norwalk Historical Cemetery.

== Historical dispute ==
Norwalk historian, Gloria Stewart claims that eighteenth century documents available from the Connecticut state archives dispute the Yankee Doodle identity. One document is a bill for work copying and sending letters for the Connecticut General Assembly. The other is a 1775 document written by Fitch stating that he resigned his commission because of rheumatism that he had for twenty years.

In addition, no Thomas Fitch from Norwalk appears as a colonel in the Rolls of Connecticut Men in the French and Indian War, 1755-1762. There were only two regiments in June 1755. Only Major General Phineas Lyman led more than a single regiment. Indeed, no Colonel appears to have been sent from Norwalk in the war. The original Yankee Doodle song did not mention a pony, a feather or "Marconi", items which first appear in 1841 in a children's nursery version of the song.

| Preceded by Joseph Platt Jr. Samuel Fitch | Member of the House of Representatives of the Connecticut Colony from Norwalk; October 1761 – May 1762; With: Peter Lockwood | Succeeded by Joseph Platt Jr. |
| Preceded by Peter Lockwood; Nathaniel Benedict | Member of the House of Representatives of the Connecticut Colony from Norwalk; May 1763 – October 1767; With: Peter Lockwood; Joseph Platt Jr. Joseph Hall | Succeeded by Joseph Platt Jr. |
| Preceded by Asa Spalding | Member of the House of Representatives of the Connecticut Colony from Norwalk; October 1768 – May 1770; With: Thomas Belden | Succeeded by Joseph Platt Jr. Thomas Belden |
| Preceded by Joseph Platt Jr. Thomas Belden | Member of the House of Representatives of the Connecticut Colony from Norwalk; October 1770 – May 1771; With: Thomas Belden | Succeeded by Thomas Belden |
| Preceded by Thomas Belden | Member of the House of Representatives of the Connecticut Colony from Norwalk; October 1771 – May 1772; With: Thomas Belden | Succeeded by Thomas Belden; Uriah Rogers |
| Preceded by Thomas Belden; Uriah Rogers | Member of the House of Representatives of the Connecticut Colony from Norwalk; October 1772 – May 1773; With: Thomas Belden | Succeeded by Thomas Belden |
| Preceded by Thomas Belden | Member of the House of Representatives of the Connecticut Colony from Norwalk; October 1773 – May 1774; With: Thomas Belden | Succeeded by Thomas Belden |
| Preceded by Thomas Belden | Member of the House of Representatives of the Connecticut from Norwalk; October 1775 – October 1776; With: Thaddeus Betts | Succeeded by Thaddeus Betts |
