= Battle of Norwalk =

1779 battle

- Part of the American Revolutionary War
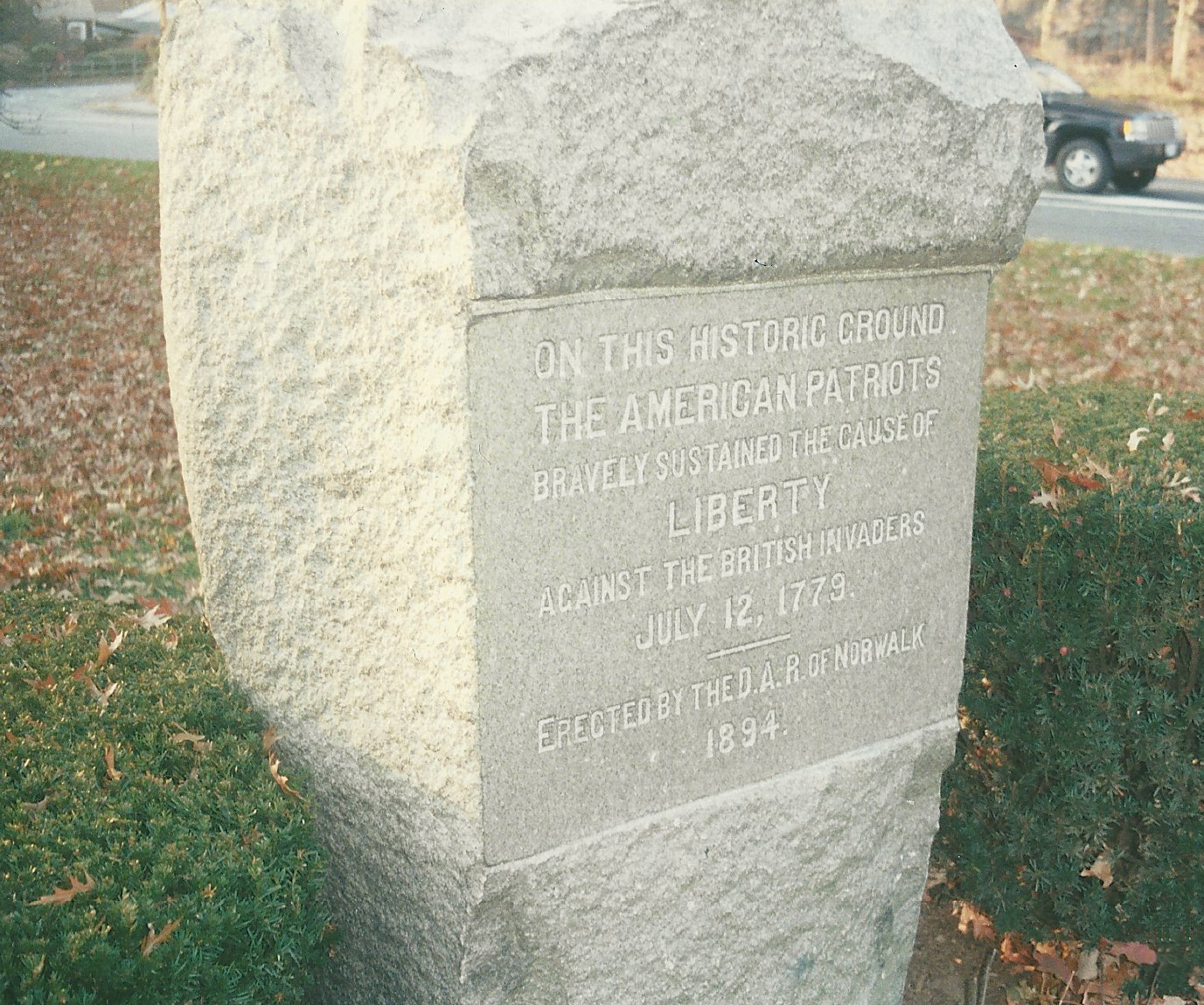
- Monument commemorating the Battle of West Rocks in Norwalk, Connecticut
Date	July 11, 1779
Location	Norwalk, Connecticut
Result	British victory

Belligerents
United States	Great Britain

Commanders and leaders
Brig. General Samuel Parsons, Colonel Samuel Whiting	William Tryon, Thomas Garth

Strength
800	2,500

Casualties and losses
Unknown	20 killed, 96 wounded, 23 missing

The Battle of Norwalk (also known as the Battle of West Rocks or Battle of the Rocks) was a series of skirmishes between the Thirteen Colonies and Great Britain during the American Revolutionary War. The attack was one part of a series of raids on coastal Connecticut towns collectively known as Tryon's raid. The battle was fought in Norwalk, Connecticut on July 11, 1779. 70th (Surrey) Regiment of Foot of Great Britain commanded by Major General William Tryon arrived on July 10, 1779. They marched in a two pronged attack on both sides of the Norwalk River. They followed a path along what is today East and West Avenues burning everything along the way. Only six houses within the business district at Head of River were spared.

On July 9, 1779 Brigadier General Samuel Holden Parsons, of the Continental Army, was in Redding, Connecticut where he had been sent by Commander-in Chief George Washington to assess the situation and take charge of the militia in case of further raids, as Washington and General Oliver Wolcott felt that Norwalk would be the next target of the British. Parsons also urgently appealed to Brigadier General John Glover of the Continental Army to bring his brigade to Norwalk from where he was camped in New London, Connecticut.

On July 10 at 2:00pm the British fleet, including the flagship HMS Camilla and HMS Hussar, left Huntington Bay, New York and crossed Long Island Sound to Norwalk. Around 5:00pm the fleet anchored outside the Norwalk Islands and troops began rowing ashore. At about the same time, Hussar entered the Norwalk River to cover the landing of troops and destroy whatever shipping was to be found.

"To follow the course of the enemy through the town on that day of terror one should start at Fitch's Point, where the troops landed on the evening before and en-camped for the night. The place has been marked with a metal tablet mounted on a wayside stone by the Norwalk Chapter D. A. R." These troops included the 54th Regiment of Foot along with the Landgraf Regiment and Jaegers, the latter two of whom were Hessian troops. The Loyalist King's American Regiment landed at 3:00am. The soldiers rested on their arms and just before dawn began their march to the center of town. They met virtually no resistance from the local militia in this area until they reached Grumman Hill, where fifty Continental troops and a few militiamen, all under the command of Captain Stephen Betts, attempted to halt Tryon's advance. After a brief skirmish the British took the hill and sent the colonists fleeing.

General Thomas Garth, who landed his troops, two flanks of Guards and two fusilier regiments, in Old Well around 7 AM, meantime began to march ashore to join with Tryon's forces. At Flax Hill they met with strong resistance from Nathaniel Raymond and fourteen other irregulars from the town of Old Well (South Norwalk). General Garth lost a light cannon to the "rebels" before marching along the river by West Avenue, being constantly harassed by Norwalk militia, irregulars, and citizens above them on the bluffs, The British crossed the Norwalk River at the location of today's Wall Street while the colonists crossed about a quarter mile upstream at Cross Street, making their way over Sticky Plain to "the Rocks" where the stronghold of the rest of the militia and Betts' Continentals was located.

The two British columns converged at the Mill Hill area by the town green (41.1174°N 73.4095°W) then proceeded north to the area then known as "the Rocks" where they met heavy resistance from the Norwalk militia and Continental troops.

General Tryon began burning houses (in East Norwalk) which local militia had used as cover to pick off his soldiers. General Garth also burned along West Avenue for the same reason. A total of eighty houses, two churches, eighty-seven barns, seventeen shops, and four mills were burned by the British. Losses were later estimated to amount to over 26 thousand British pounds.

General Tryon had commanded his raid on the Connecticut coast in the preceding days, attacking New Haven, Connecticut and Fairfield, Connecticut. Most of Fairfield and Norwalk were destroyed. Tryon's raid was intended to draw colonial forces away from the defense of the Hudson Valley. In spite of pressure from Governor Trumbull, George Washington did not move his troops.

Norwalk was heavily damaged. George Washington described it as having been “destroyed” in his report to the Continental Congress after the battle.
