= Thaddeus Betts (physician) =

Physician, Connecticut politician

Member of the Connecticut House of Representatives from Norwalk
- In office October 1774, October 1775, May and October 1776, May 1784, October 1785, and May 1786. –

Personal details
- Born: May 3, 1724 Norwalk, Connecticut, British America
- Died: March 22, 1807 (aged 82) Norwalk, Connecticut, US
- Spouse(s): Mary Gold (m. November 8, 1752, d. November 20, 1752), Elizabeth Maltby (m. May 15, 1754, d. February 8, 1789), Ellen or Eleanor Lyman (m. November 8, 1789)
- Children: William Maltby Betts
- Education: Yale University; Connecticut Medical Society (M.D. 1797)
- Occupation: physician

Thaddeus Betts (May 3, 1724 – March 22, 1807) was a physician and member of the Connecticut House of Representatives from Norwalk in the sessions of October 1774, October 1775, May and October 1776, May 1784, October 1785, and May 1786.

He was the son of John Betts, Jr. and Demaris Lockwood. He graduated from Yale University prior to 1752, and upon graduation, won a Berkeley Scholarship. As early as 1752, he settled in Ridgefield, but moved back to Norwalk soon afterwards. He married Mary Gold on November 8, 1752, but she died 12 days later. He married Elizabeth Maltby on May 15, 1754. They had one son, William Maltby Betts, who also served in the Connecticut General Assembly, was a judge, and father of Thaddeus Betts, lieutenant governor.

He served in the Connecticut General Assembly representing Norwalk in 1774, 1775, 1776.

An M.D. degree was conferred on him by the Connecticut Medical Society in 1797. His wife Elizabeth died on February 8, 1789. He married the widow of a former classmate, Daniel Lyman, on November 8, 1789.

He died in Norwalk on March 22, 1807.

Preceded by unknown	Member of the Connecticut House of Representatives from Norwalk; 1776–1777; With: Thomas Fitch, V	Succeeded by Daniel Betts, Jr. Moses Comstock
