= 1882 Connecticut lieutenant gubernatorial election =

- November 7, 1882

Nominee	George G. Sumner	John D. Candee
Party	Democratic	Republican
Popular vote	59,154	54,907
Percentage	51.10%	47.40%
Lieutenant Governor before election
William H. Bulkeley
Republican
Elected Lieutenant Governor
George G. Sumner
Democratic

The 1882 Connecticut lieutenant gubernatorial election was held on November 7, 1882, to elect the lieutenant governor of Connecticut. Democratic nominee and former Mayor of Hartford George G. Sumner won the election against Republican nominee John D. Candee, Prohibition nominee William S. Baker and Greenback nominee Herbert Baker.

== General election ==
On election day, November 7, 1882, Democratic nominee George G. Sumner won the election with 51.10% of the vote, thereby gaining Democratic control over the office of lieutenant governor. Sumner was sworn in as the 61st lieutenant governor of Connecticut on January 3, 1883.

=== Results ===
Connecticut lieutenant gubernatorial election, 1882
Party	Candidate	Votes	%
Democratic	George G. Sumner	59,154	51.10
Republican	John D. Candee	54,907	47.40
Prohibition	William S. Baker	1,026	0.90
Greenback	Herbert Baker	731	0.60
	Scattering	35	0.00
Total votes		115,853	100.00
Democratic gain from Republican			
