= Senator Bulkeley =

Senator Bulkeley may refer to:

- Eliphalet Adams Bulkeley (1804–1872), Connecticut State Senate
- Morgan Bulkeley (1837–1922), U.S. Senator from Connecticut from 1905 to 1911
- Robert J. Bulkley (1880–1965), U.S. Senator from Ohio from 1930 to 1939
