= Morgan B. Brainard =

Morgan Bulkeley Brainard (January 8, 1879 - August 28, 1957) was an American attorney, insurance executive, and book collector. He served as president of Aetna from 1922 to 1956, following his uncle Morgan Bulkeley. Brainard was a director of the New York, New Haven and Hartford Railroad until his resignation in 1955.

He and Eleanor Stuart Moffat married on 27 April 1905. He had five children.
