= Bulkeley Bridge =

Bridge in Connecticut, US

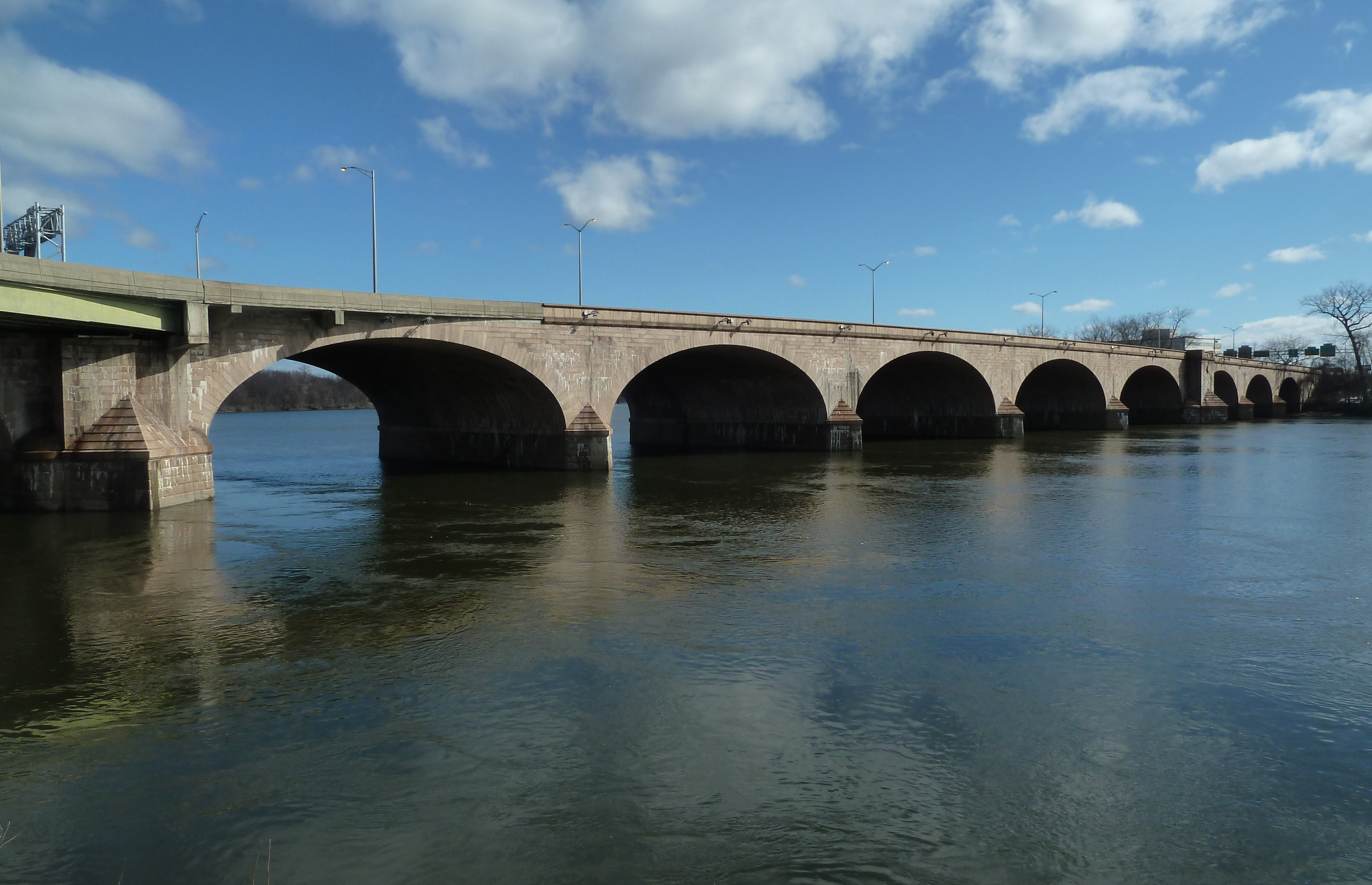
- Bulkeley Bridge in March 2013
- Coordinates: 41°46′08″N 72°39′54″W
- Carries: 8 lanes of I-84 / US 6 / US 44, bikes/pedestrians
- Crosses: Connecticut River
- Locale: Hartford, Connecticut and East Hartford, Connecticut
- Official name: Morgan G. Bulkeley Bridge
- Maintained by: ConnDOT

Characteristics
- Design: stone arch bridge
- Total length: 1,075 feet (328 m)
- Width: 110 feet (34 m)
- Longest span: 119 feet (36 m)
- Clearance below: 39 feet (12 m)

History
- Construction start: 1903
- Construction end: 1908
- Opened: 1908

Statistics
- Toll
- Morgan G. Bulkeley Bridge
- U.S. National Register of Historic Places
- Location: I-84 / US 6 / US 44, Hartford and East Hartford
- Coordinates: 41°46′10″N 72°39′55″W
- Built: 1908
- Architect: Graves, Edwin D., Wheelwright, Edmund M.
- Architectural style: Classical Revival
- NRHP reference No.: 93001347
- Added to NRHP: December 10, 1993

Location
- Interactive map of Bulkeley Bridge

The Bulkeley Bridge (also known as Hartford Bridge, Bridge No. 980A) is the oldest of three highway bridges over the Connecticut River between Hartford, Connecticut and East Hartford, Connecticut. A stone arch bridge composed of nine spans, the bridge carries Interstate 84, U.S. Route 6, and U.S. Route 44 across the river. As of 2005, the bridge carried an average daily traffic of 142,500 cars. The arches are mounted on stone piers, and vary in length from 68 feet (21 m) to 119 feet (36 m); the total length of the bridge is 1,192 feet (363 m).

Completed in 1908, the Bulkeley Bridge is the oldest bridge in the Hartford area and one of the oldest bridges still in use in the Interstate Highway System. It is also the largest and one of the last major stone arch bridges to be built in New England.

Because of its historical, architectural and engineering significance, the Bulkeley Bridge was added to the National Register of Historic Places in 1993.

== History ==
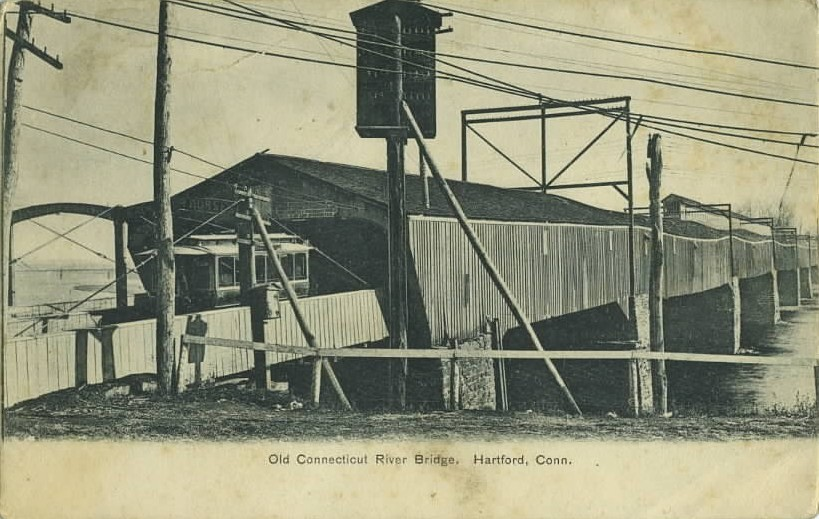
Postcard view of the 1818–1895 covered bridge

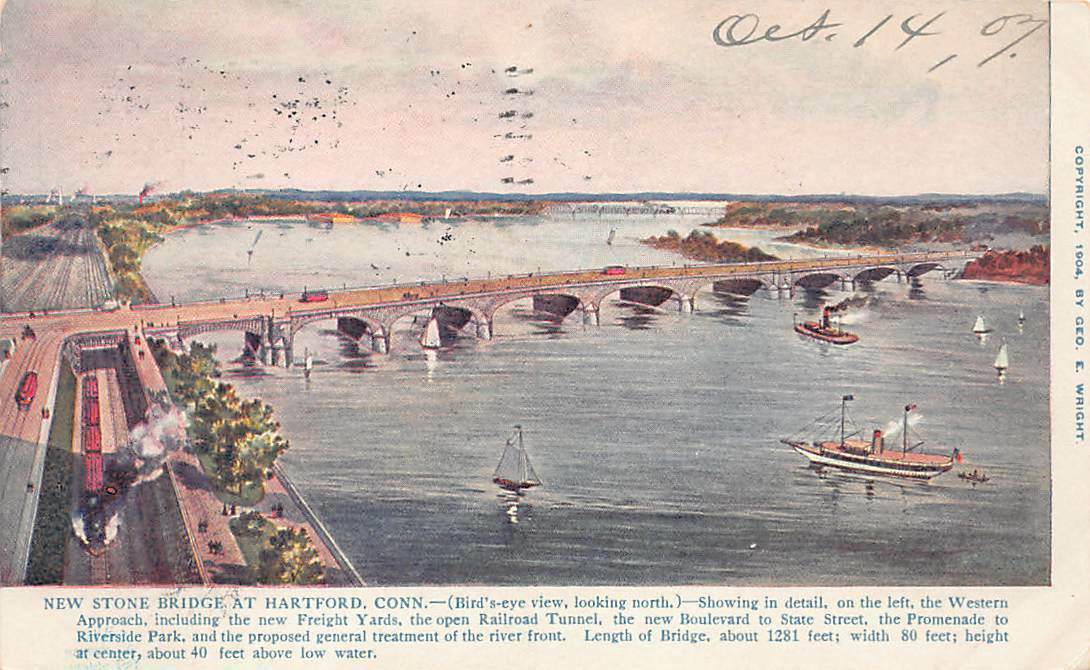
Postcard illustration of "the new bridge", 1904.

The first substantial bridge across the Connecticut River at Hartford was the Hartford Toll Bridge, a two-lane covered bridge that opened in 1818. The 974 feet (297 m) span carried horse traffic, and in 1890 trolley lines were added, connecting Hartford to East Hartford and Glastonbury. On May 17, 1895, the bridge was destroyed in a fire. The flames started near the East Hartford end of the bridge, and within ten minutes had swept the entire tinder-dry structure. There had been much agitation for a new bridge, and the Hartford Courant reported a crowd of 20,000 spectators lined the banks of both sides of the river to watch the bridge burn.

Backed by civic groups who saw an opportunity to create a monumental structure, construction on a permanent "Hartford Bridge" began in 1903. Hartford's civic and business leaders were determined that the new bridge would be "an ornament to the city which should endure forever." Designed by Edward Dwight Graves, the neo-classical stone arch bridge design that was selected in 1903 stood in contrast to the various truss bridges and suspension bridges in vogue at the time.

To create a proper setting, the bridge commission tore down rows of tenements and constructed wide, landscaped approach boulevards on both sides of the river. The bridge opened on Oct. 6, 1908. At a total price tag of $3 million it was the most expensive bridge in the state, costing half-million dollars more than the Connecticut State Capitol building itself. Constructed from over 100,000 cubic yards (76,000 m^{3}) of grey and pink granite, each ten-ton block was cut to remarkable tolerances of within a 3/8ths of an inch. When completed, the bridge connected two city streets: Morgan Street in Hartford and Hartford Avenue (now Connecticut Boulevard) in East Hartford.

After his death in 1922, the span was renamed for Senator Morgan Bulkeley. The former four-term mayor of Hartford had been instrumental in the bridge's planning process. Bulkeley also served as Governor of Connecticut and United States Senator and was serving as the third president of Hartford-based Aetna Life Insurance Company. He was also elected to National Baseball Hall of Fame as the first president of the National League.

As horse and buggy gave way to the automobile, the Bulkeley Bridge became the most important vehicular span in the state. Until 1942, the Bulkeley was the only motor vehicle bridge across the Connecticut River between Warehouse Point in East Windsor and Middletown. It handled a lot of cross-state traffic: US 5, US 6, and US 44, as well as earlier iterations of Route 17 and Route 101. Following a pair of horrific floods in 1936 and 1938 a series of levees were constructed along the banks of the Connecticut River, beginning Hartford's retreat from the waterfront and partially obscuring views of the bridge.

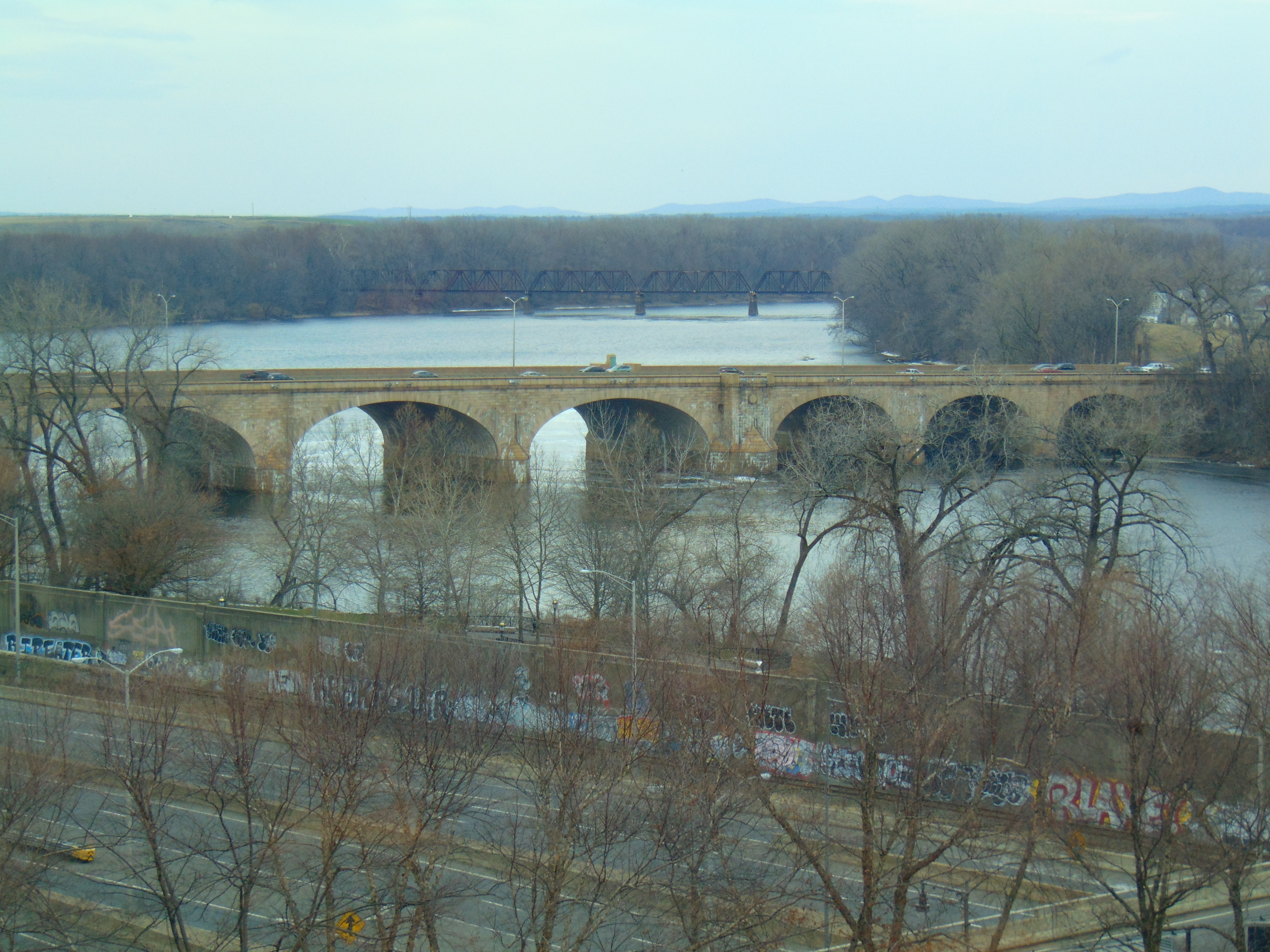
I-91 and the Bulkeley Bridge in 2017

Congestion on city streets and the Bulkeley Bridge led the state to build an expressway bypass route and a new crossing just to the south, the Charter Oak Bridge, which opened in 1942. Founders Bridge, third Connecticut River crossing within the City of Hartford was inaugurated in 1958.

The traffic relief on the Bulkeley was short-lived, however, for much more significant changes were in the wings. By the late 1950s work had already begun on what is now I-84, Connecticut's main east-west corridor. Morgan Street and the carefully laid out approaches to the bridge were moved or covered first by the new interstate and later by its intersection with Interstate 91. According to urban legend, Beatrice Fox Auerbach single-handedly decided that the two Interstates would meet at the western side of the Bulkeley Bridge without a direct connection. This would force traffic to use local streets and conveniently have pass by the G. Fox & Co. department store (which was owned by Auerbach) in Downtown Hartford. I-84 would use the bridge to cross into East Hartford.

In 1964, the bridge was widened to eight lanes. However, two lanes in each direction are auxiliary, serving exits and entrances, leaving only two lanes in each direction for through traffic on I-84.

Until Riverfront Recapture efforts of the 1980s and 1990s, the bridge remained largely hidden from view behind the flood control dikes and highways.

== See also ==
- List of crossings of the Connecticut River
- National Register of Historic Places listings in Hartford, Connecticut
- National Register of Historic Places listings in Hartford County, Connecticut
- List of bridges on the National Register of Historic Places in Connecticut
