= William H. Bulkeley =

American politician

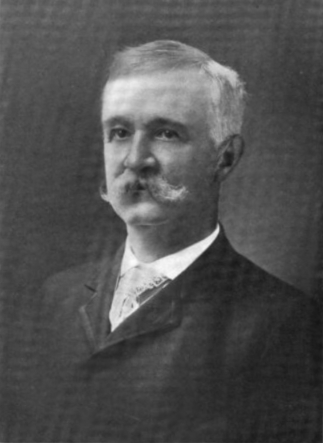

Lieutenant Governor of Connecticut
- In office January 5, 1881 – January 3, 1883
- Governor: Hobart B. Bigelow

Personal details
- Born: William Henry Bulkeley; March 2, 1840; East Haddam, Connecticut, U.S.
- Died: November 7, 1902 (aged 62); Hartford, Connecticut, U.S.
- Political party: Republican
- Occupation: Businessman, politician

William Henry Bulkeley (March 2, 1840 – November 7, 1902) was an American politician who was the 60th Lieutenant Governor of Connecticut from 1881 to 1883.

== Early life ==
William H. Bulkeley was born in East Haddam, Connecticut, March 2, 1840. He was the son of Eliphalet Adams Bulkeley and Lydia S. Bulkeley and the brother of Morgan Bulkeley. His father was Member of Connecticut State Senate for the 19th District, 1838, 1840 and Speaker of the Connecticut House of Representatives. His brother was Governor of Connecticut from 1889 to 1893 and a United States senator.

In 1847, the family moved to Hartford, Connecticut. He left high school before graduation, despite admirable records, and entered an old, leading dry-goods establishment as a clerk. In March 1857, he moved to Brooklyn, New York City, and engaged in the same business with H.P. Morgan & Co, before starting in the trade himself. He served in the Union Army during the Civil War. In 1868, he returned to Hartford, where he organized the Kellog & Bulkeley Company, lithographers, of which he was president for many years. He was also vice-president of the Aetna Life Insurance Company for many years.

== Political career ==
Bulkeley was a Republican. He was in the common council board of Hardford for five years, serving one year as vice-president, on year as president. He was then appointed a member of the board of street commissioners. He was elected Lieutenant Governor of Connecticut in November 1880 and served for one two-year term from January 5, 1881 to January 3, 1883, alongside governor Hobart B. Bigelow.

He was a brigadier general in Connecticut National Guard.

In 1895 he became, along with his brother Morgan, a member of the Military Order of Foreign Wars (MOFW) by right of their descent from Captain Eliphalet Bulkeley who was an office in the Connecticut Militia during the American Revolution. In 1896 he was a founding member of the Connecticut Commandery of the MOFW.

He died at his home in Hartford on November 7, 1902.

Political offices
Preceded by David Gallup	Lieutenant Governor of Connecticut; 1881-1883	Succeeded by George G. Sumner
