= Morgan Bulkeley =

American politician and businessman (1837–1922)

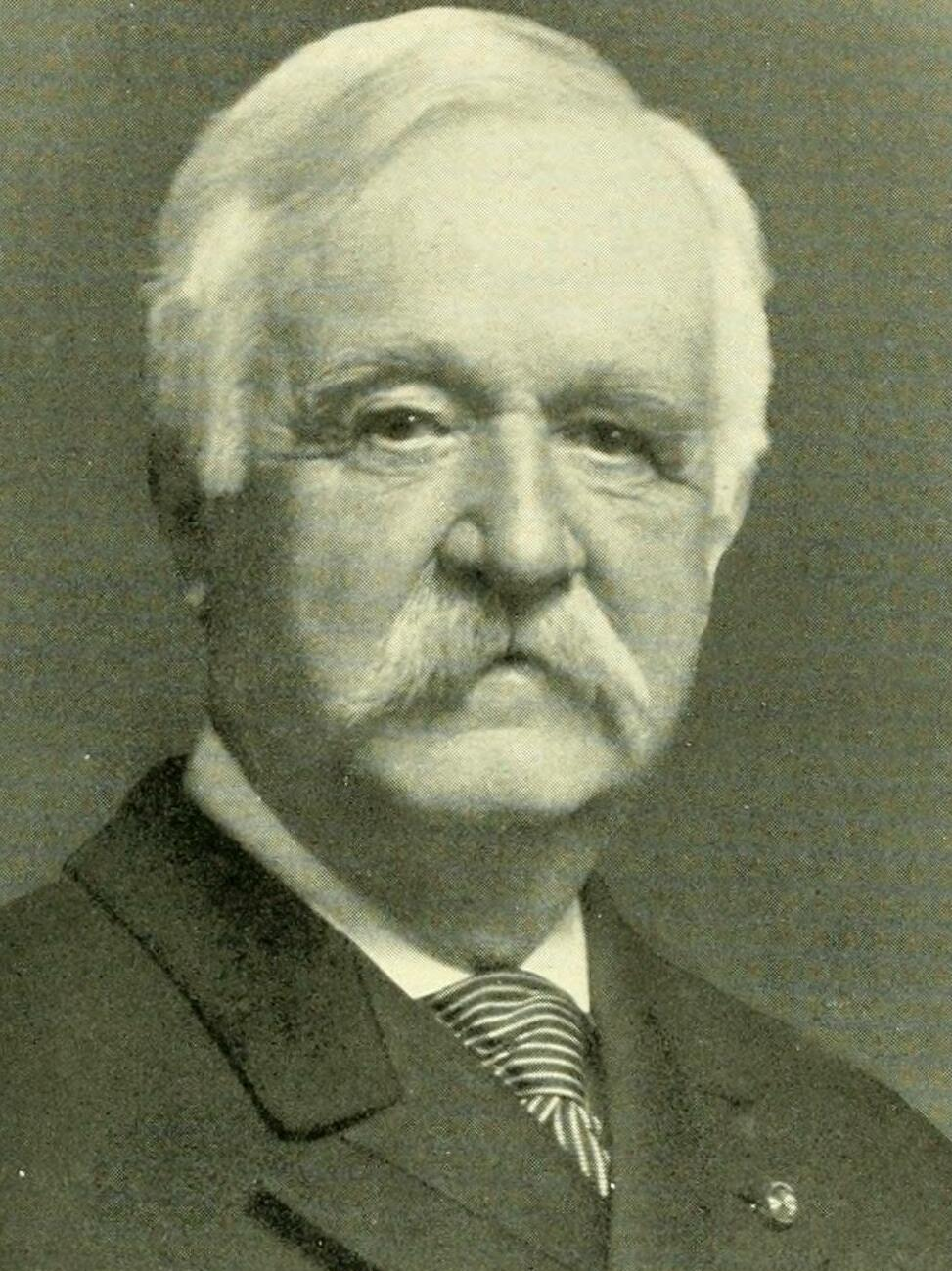

United States Senator from Connecticut
- In office March 4, 1905 – March 3, 1911
- Preceded by: Joseph R. Hawley
- Succeeded by: George P. McLean

54th Governor of Connecticut
- In office January 10, 1889 – January 4, 1893
- Lieutenant: Samuel E. Merwin
- Preceded by: Phineas C. Lounsbury
- Succeeded by: Luzon B. Morris

25th Mayor of Hartford, Connecticut
- In office April 5, 1880 – April 2, 1888
- Preceded by: George G. Sumner
- Succeeded by: John G. Root

1st President of the National League of Professional Baseball Clubs
- In office February 2, 1876 – December 7, 1876
- Preceded by: Position established
- Succeeded by: William Hulbert

Personal details
- Born: Morgan Gardner Bulkeley; December 26, 1837 East Haddam, Connecticut, U.S.
- Died: November 6, 1922 (aged 84) Hartford, Connecticut, U.S.
- Resting place: Cedar Hill Cemetery; Hartford, Connecticut, U.S.
- Party: Republican
- Spouse: Fannie Briggs Houghton Bulkeley (1885–1922, his death)
- Children: 3
- Relatives: Peter Bulkley (ancestor); Eliphalet Adams Bulkeley (father); William H. Bulkeley (brother); Morgan B. Brainard (nephew)
- Nickname: "The Crowbar Governor"

Military service
- Allegiance: United States
- Branch/service: U.S. Army (Union Army)
- Years of service: 1862
- Rank: Private
- Unit: 13th New York State Militia
- Battles/wars: American Civil War
Morgan Bulkeley
Member of the National
Baseball Hall of Fame
- Induction: 1937
- Election method: Centennial Commission

Morgan Gardner Bulkeley (December 26, 1837 – November 6, 1922) was an American politician of the Republican Party, businessman, and insurance executive. In 1876, he served as the first president of baseball's National League and, because of that, was inducted into the National Baseball Hall of Fame in 1937, a choice that remains controversial, since his time as a baseball executive was short.

Bulkeley was born in East Haddam, Connecticut. His father was Judge Eliphalet Adams Bulkeley, a prominent local lawyer and businessman, who became the first president of the Aetna Life Insurance Company. The family moved to Hartford, where Morgan Bulkeley was educated, before he took a job in the city of Brooklyn, New York. He served briefly in the American Civil War, where he saw no combat. When his father died in 1872, he moved back to Hartford and became a bank president and a board member of Aetna, becoming its president in 1879, a post he held the rest of his life.

When the Hartford Dark Blues baseball team was asked to join the new National League in 1876, Bulkeley, the team president, was asked to become league president, despite having minimal baseball experience. He served one season, while most of the work was done by Chicago White Stockings owner William Hulbert. Bulkeley also served on the Hartford Common Council and in 1880 was elected to the first of four two-year terms as mayor of Hartford.

Bulkeley was elected Governor of Connecticut, taking office in 1889. He was not renominated by the Republicans, but served a second two-year term because the houses of the state legislature could not agree on the outcome of the 1890 election. Holding over in office after the end of his elected term, he found the entry to the executive offices at the State House was locked against him; he had it opened with a crowbar, thus earning him the nickname "the Crowbar Governor". He left office in 1893, and served one term as U.S. senator from Connecticut from 1905 to 1911. In his final years he remained involved with civic and philanthropic activities. After his death in 1922, several structures in Hartford, including a bridge and a high school, were named for him.

== Early life and career ==
Morgan Gardner Bulkeley was born on December 26, 1837, in East Haddam, Connecticut, to an old local family; both his parents descended from passengers of the Mayflower more than 200 years prior. One prominent ancestor of the Bulkeleys was Peter Bulkley, founder of Concord, Massachusetts. Morgan was the third of six children and the second son (an older sister and a younger brother died young). Morgan's father, Eliphalet Adams Bulkeley, commonly called "Judge Bulkeley" for his service early in his career on East Haddam's probate court, was a lawyer, businessman, public official and a founder both of the Aetna Life Insurance Company and of the Republican Party in Connecticut. His mother, born Lydia Smith Morgan, was distantly related to J. P. Morgan.

The Bulkeley family initially lived in East Haddam, but the judge saw greater opportunities in Hartford, and the family moved there in 1847. Unlike his older brother Charles, who attended three private schools before securing a degree from Yale College in 1856, Morgan was not a gifted student, attending Centre School in Hartford (later known as the Brown School), and Bacon Academy but apparently did not graduate from Bacon. He took a job with Lydia Bulkeley's brother, Henry Morgan, leaving Hartford to work for his uncle's company, H. P. Morgan & Company, in Brooklyn, New York. There, he began by learning the dry goods trade and remained almost twenty years, eventually becoming a partner. While in Brooklyn, he served as a member of the Kings County Republican Committee.

During the Civil War, Bulkeley served as a private with the 13th Regiment of the New York Militia. His younger brother, William Bulkeley, who had also come to Brooklyn to work at the Morgan store, went on ninety days' active service in 1861, while Morgan Bulkeley joined the home guard. This arrangement was presumably so that Henry Morgan would not be deprived of the assistance of both of them. William saw no combat; then, in May 1862, Morgan Bulkeley joined for a ninety-day term. The regiment was sent to Suffolk, Virginia, and saw no action, losing one man to friendly fire and one to heart disease. The 13th returned to the city of Brooklyn in September 1862 and Morgan Bulkeley returned to his employment, where he remained another ten years. His older brother Charles rose to the rank of captain of the 1st Connecticut Heavy Artillery Regiment, but died of disease in camp in February 1864, making Morgan the judge's oldest surviving son, and slated to eventually assume his responsibilities. Despite minimal service in the Civil War, the conflict had a considerable effect on Morgan Bulkeley's life, both because of the change of position in the family, and because after the war, he became deeply involved in such veterans' groups as the Grand Army of the Republic (GAR). When Judge Bulkeley died in 1872, Morgan returned to Hartford to look after his father's estate and was made a board member of Aetna.

In Hartford, Bulkeley helped form the United States Bank of Hartford, becoming its president. Through the bank, he became involved in a number of charitable and civic activities, and was elected to the Hartford Common Council in 1874.

== Baseball ==
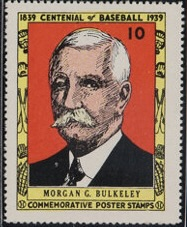
Commemorative "stamp" depicting Bulkeley issued by the Baseball Hall of Fame in 1939

The first professional baseball league, the National Association of Professional Base Ball Players (National Association or NA), began play in 1871. In 1874, Hartford entered a team; Bulkeley was a shareholder in and president of the team, the Hartford Dark Blues. Hartford finished in seventh place out of eight, and sought to sign star players. In 1875, led by Candy Cummings and player-manager Bob "Death to Flying Things" Ferguson, Hartford finished third.

Chicago White Stockings owner William Hulbert devised a plan to form a new league with the strongest NA teams. At a meeting in New York on February 2, 1876, four team presidents from the East, including Bulkeley, and four from further west, including Hulbert, agreed to form the National League. Bulkeley was one of five directors, selected by lot.

Like all that happened during this historic [February 2, 1876] meeting, several versions exist regarding the nomination and election of Morgan Bulkeley as the National League's first president. The stately Bulkeley, 39-year-old president of the Hartford Dark Blues, the portrait of quiet elegance, was an obvious choice. Always dressed immaculately, Bulkeley cut a figure of conservative calm. His sweeping, steer-horn mustache, erect soldier-straight posture and serious, stoic countenance made him, on appearance alone, the ideal candidate for almost any presidency.

— Neil W. Macdonald, The League That Lasted: 1876 and the Founding of the National League of Professional Base Ball Clubs, p. 56

Bulkeley was named as president. Albert Spalding later remembered that Bulkeley was reluctant, but was persuaded by Hulbert, who said it was a tribute to the East, where baseball had its origin and early development. Bulkeley stated he would only serve for one year, and, in practice, Hulbert did most of the work while Bulkeley was president.

The reasons for the appointment of Bulkeley, who had no deep connection to baseball, are unclear. According to Irv Goldfarb in his article on Bulkeley for the Society for American Baseball Research, "the highly provincial world of early professional ball dictated that naming an Easterner to the post would be the most propitious political move". According to David Krell in his journal article on Bulkeley's role in the founding of the National League, "Bulkeley contributed his good name to the National League launch by agreeing to serve as its first president, lending a measure of credibility to the nascent league". David L. Fleitz, in his book on little-known Baseball Hall of Fame figures, stated, "Hulbert needed Eastern support for the National League to succeed, and Bulkeley's assumption of the presidency was an important element of Hulbert's overall plan." According to his Hall of Fame biography, Hulbert and Spalding "saw in him the integrity and character needed to drive the league's acceptance".

As head of the Hartford franchise, Bulkeley refused to allow his team's scores to be transmitted from the ballpark to where fans not attending the game gathered, something the Chicago Tribune deemed a stupid idea. As president, Bulkeley targeted illegal gambling, drinking and fan rowdiness. However, he had little insight into baseball, being mainly an investor with little passion for the sport, and his businesses and other interests, such as harness racing, took up much of his time. After the 1876 season, he stepped down and Hulbert was elected National League president. The Hartford franchise played only two seasons in the National League; Bulkeley, unable to boost attendance, sold his interest in the team before the 1877 season.

Bulkeley was one of the seven members of the 1905 Mills Commission formed by Spalding, the group that gave credence to the story that Abner Doubleday invented baseball. Goldfarb described the Mills Commission as a "panel whose questionable findings about the origins of baseball are still being debated today".

== Businessman and politician ==
=== Hartford municipal official ===
Bulkeley's short career as a baseball executive coincided with the beginning of his political career. From 1875 to 1876, he served on the Hartford Common Council, and in 1876 was elected as an alderman, serving two years in that position. When Thomas O. Enders resigned as president of Aetna due to ill health in 1879, Bulkeley became the company's third president. He would serve in that capacity for forty-three years and as a director for almost half a century. Under Bulkeley, the firm's assets rose from $25 million in 1880 to more than $200 million by the time of his death in 1922, with the amount of insurance in force increasing eighteenfold. The techniques it used under Bulkeley to reach the minimum required return on investment of 4 percent included loaning to farmers on the developing frontier, and, as they repaid and the areas they were in became more stable, investing in the municipal bonds of Western towns. Among the new lines of insurance Aetna developed under Bulkeley were accident, liability, health and automobile insurance.

In 1878, Bulkeley ran as a Republican for mayor of Hartford. He was defeated by George G. Sumner. He worked to increase his popularity, supplying the illuminations for the opening of the Connecticut State Capitol in 1879. When he ran again in 1880, he secured many votes of Irish immigrants in the city wards alongside the Connecticut River, which had given him his margin of defeat in 1878, by buying them. Bulkeley most likely conspired with former alderman Gideon Winslow to purchase votes in exchange for five dollars' worth of provisions at Winslow's grocery store. This was a sum equal to several days' work for a laborer. According to Bulkeley's biographer, Kevin Murphy, "Without chicanery, how could Bulkeley have done so well there [in the river wards] in 1880, 1882, 1884, and 1886? The answer is, of course, he could not have." This corruption, which won him all eight of the wards in 1880, lost him the support of even some Republicans, which he won back by buying fewer votes in his three successful re-election bids. Having won the heavily-Democratic fifth and sixth wards in 1880, he lost both twice and split them once in his re-election bids, but on average won 45 percent of the vote.

During his mayoralty, Bulkeley took over the annual excursion the city ran for poor children, which was having trouble getting contributions, and financed it from his own pocket, hiring a train for several hundred children to go to the summer resort of Fenwick. This was cited as a reason that the poorer wards gave him votes. The excursion did not occur in 1884 as Bulkeley was in Europe, and lapsed after that.

Charles W. Burpee, in his history of Hartford County, deemed Bulkeley's mayoralty "most businesslike and efficient ... instituting and promoting many important municipal projects, while he disbursed more than his salary in providing pleasure or comfort for the city's poor."

=== Governor of Connecticut ===
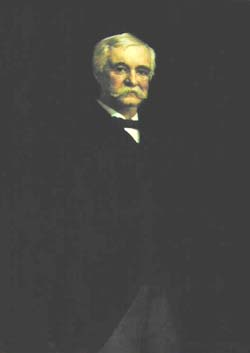
Official portrait of Bulkeley as governor, by Charles N. Flagg

In 1886, Bulkeley sought the Republican nomination for a two-year term as governor of Connecticut, but was defeated at the state convention by Phineas Lounsbury. Republicans were impressed that Bulkeley gave a reception for Lounsbury both after the convention, and after Lounsbury was inaugurated in January. The party custom of rotation in office meant that Governor Lounsbury would not seek a second term, and in 1888, Bulkeley was nominated by the Republicans, with Democrats choosing Luzon Morris as their nominee. In the election, Morris outpolled Bulkeley by about 1,400 votes but failed to get an absolute majority. Under the law at the time, the Connecticut General Assembly decided elections for state office when no candidate received a majority of the vote, and the Republican-dominated legislature selected Bulkeley.

Bulkeley devoted much of his day as governor to his duties as president of Aetna, and found time to benefit the corporation during his official duties, getting the legislature to pass an act raising taxes on insurance companies from outside Connecticut. He also performed ceremonial duties outside the state, attending the inauguration of Republican President Benjamin Harrison (who, like Bulkeley, had lost the popular vote) and riding in the parade in New York to mark the centennial of the inauguration of George Washington as president. In June 1889, the legislature passed his proposal to remove the toll on the bridge across the Connecticut River between Hartford and East Hartford.

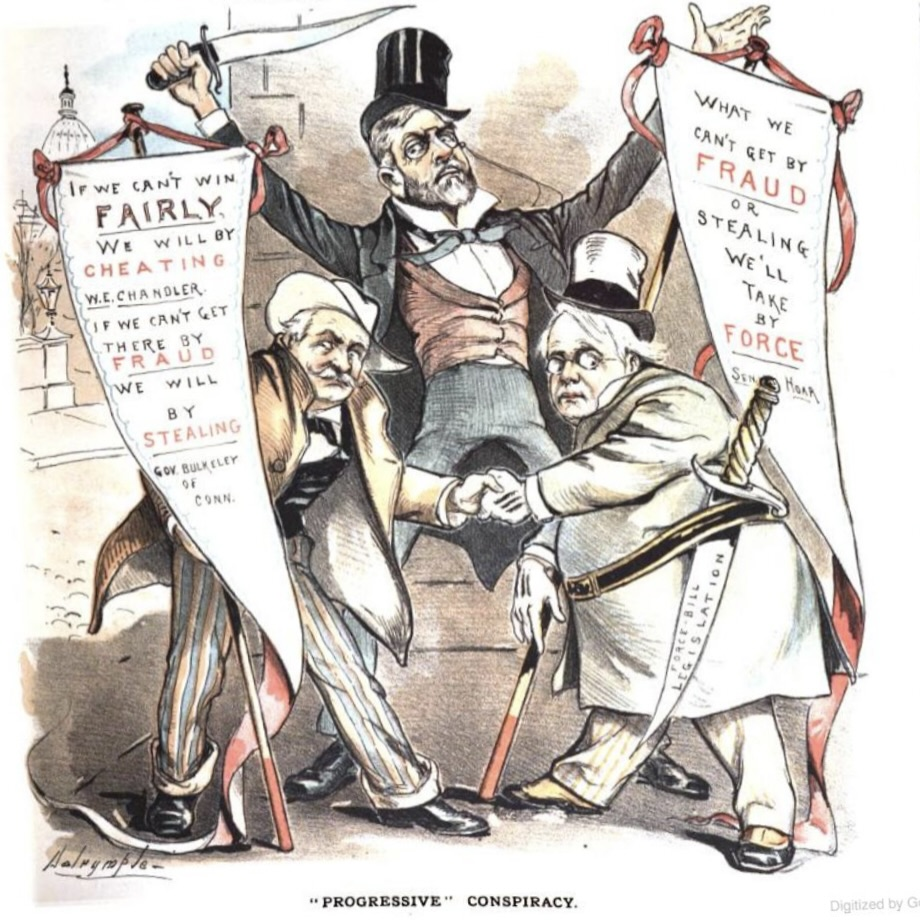
Puck magazine accuses Bulkeley (lower left) and two other Republicans of stealing elections

Despite the tradition of rotation in office, Bulkeley sought renomination in 1890, but was defeated at the state convention, which chose Samuel E. Merwin, whose Democratic opponent was Morris. Morris won the popular vote in the election, and the newly-Democratic state Senate held that he and the other Democratic candidates for state office had gotten a majority, while the Republican House of Representatives deemed they had not, and called on the Senate to meet with them to elect the state officers. As the Republican majority in the House was larger than the Democratic majority in the Senate, the Republicans would have enough legislators to elect. The Senate refused, and declared the Democrats the winners, an action the House refused to recognize.

The stalemate meant that the Republican incumbents, including Bulkeley, continued in office. The House conceded the election of the Democratic candidate for comptroller, Nicholas Staub, and he was sworn in. Staub had a padlock put on the door to the executive offices at the state capitol. On March 21, 1891, Bulkeley found the door locked against him, and he had it opened with a crowbar, thus gaining the nickname "the Crowbar Governor".

Bulkeley and the other Republican holdovers remained in office until their successors were elected in November 1892. The Senate refused to pass appropriation bills; Bulkeley financed the government with loans from Aetna. Governor David B. Hill of New York, a Democrat, refused to honor extradition requests signed by Bulkeley as governor. However, after the Supreme Court of Connecticut in January 1892 ruled that Bulkeley was legally governor, Staub agreed to pay some of the state's bills. In November of that year, Morris was elected with a clear majority and Bulkeley left office in January 1893. The General Assembly reimbursed Aetna in full. In 1901, Connecticut amended its constitution to provide that a candidate for state office could be elected with only a plurality, rather than an absolute majority, of the vote.

=== Seeking a Senate seat ===
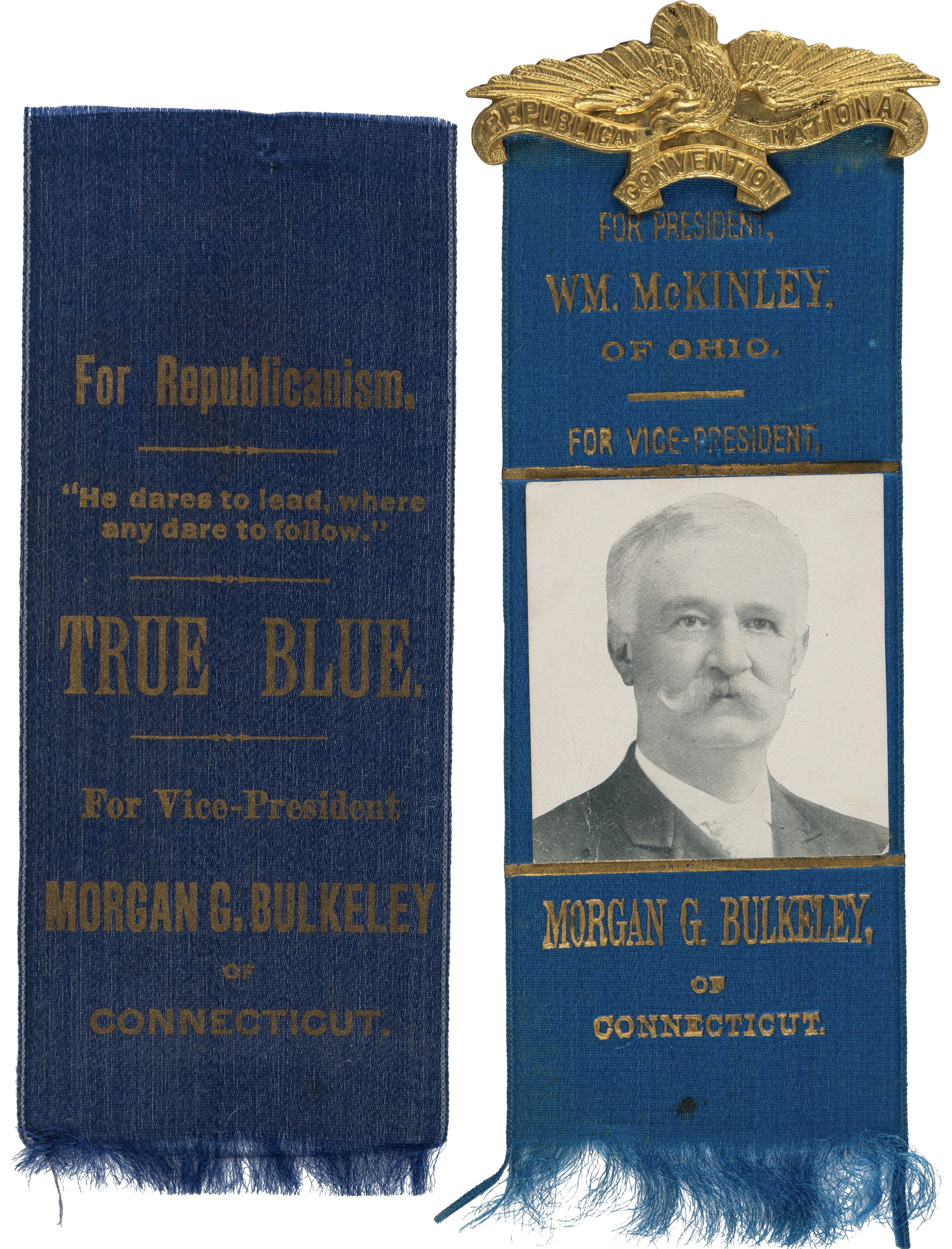
Ribbon boosting Bulkeley's candidacy for the Republican nomination for vice president, 1896

After he left office in January 1893, Bulkeley thought a U.S. Senate seat the logical next step in his political career. Connecticut's two Senate seats were held by Republicans Orville Platt and Joseph Hawley, both popular politicians who were repeatedly re-elected by the General Assembly (senators were elected by the state legislatures, not the people, until 1913). In 1893 and 1899, Bulkeley attempted to deny Hawley renomination by the Republican legislative caucus and get the seat for himself, but both times threw his support to Hawley out of fear that a younger political rival, Samuel Fessenden, would take the seat. At the 1896 Republican National Convention, Bulkeley was Connecticut's favorite son candidate for vice president, and finished third in the balloting to become former Ohio governor William McKinley's running mate, losing to Garret Hobart of New Jersey.

In 1895, the bridge over the Connecticut River between Hartford and East Hartford burned down. The legislature established a commission, with Bulkeley as chair, to oversee the building of a replacement. The bridge, initially dubbed the Hartford Bridge, but named the Bulkeley Bridge after his death in 1922, opened in 1908.

By 1904, there was little opposition to a Bulkeley run for Senate. Hawley had fallen seriously ill (he would die only two weeks after his term in the Senate expired, in March 1905), and Fessenden had blundered politically by charging an excessive legal fee on money gained from the federal government that Connecticut had been owed since the Civil War. When Republican legislators caucused in November 1904, Bulkeley got 248 votes to Fessenden's 42. In January 1905, the General Assembly overwhelmingly voted for Bulkeley for the Senate seat over the Democrat, A. Heaton Robertson.

=== Senator (1905–1911) ===
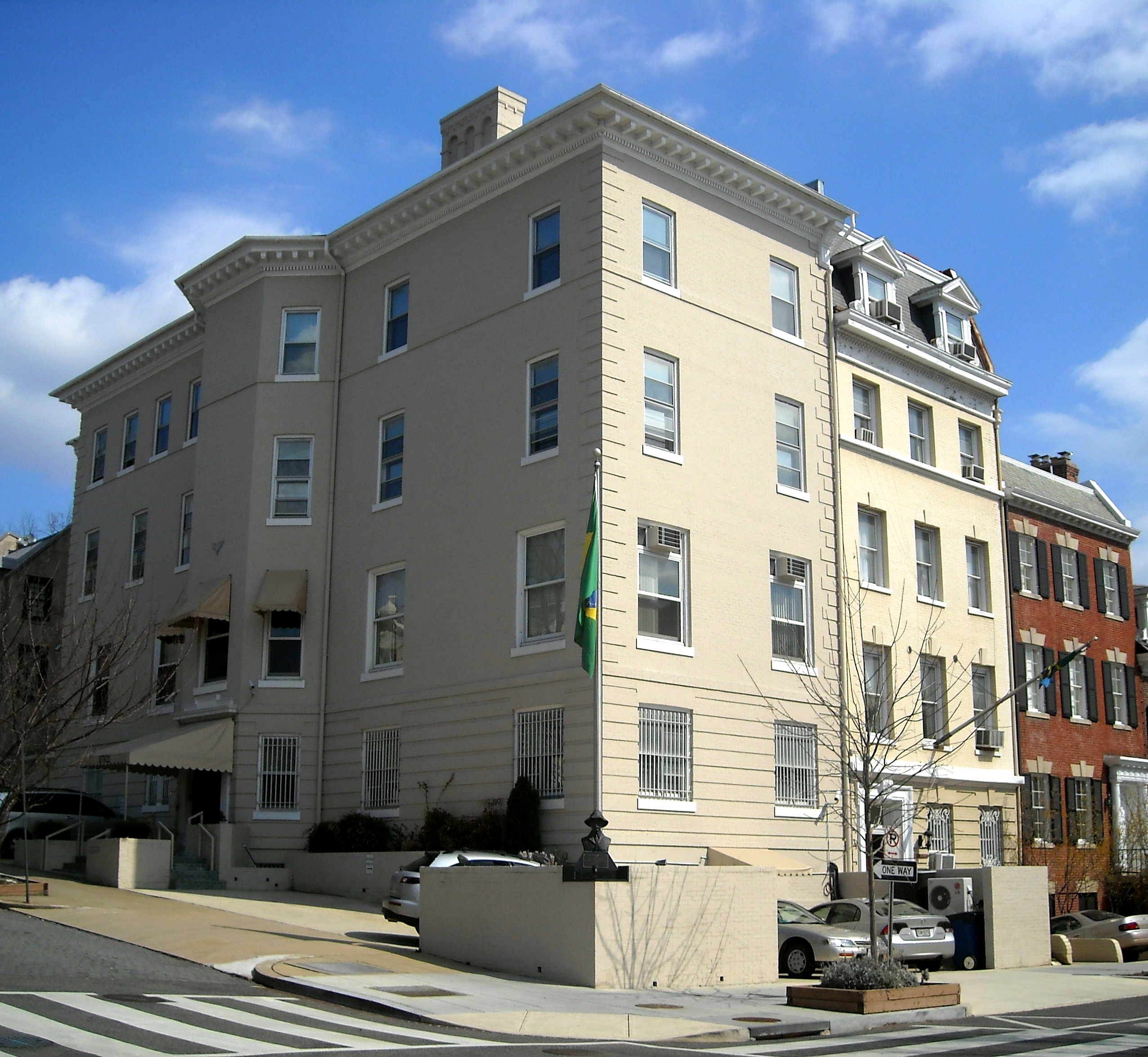
Bulkeley's residence in Washington, D.C.

Bulkeley was sworn in as a senator on March 4, 1905, at the special session of the Senate called by President Theodore Roosevelt. One of his early duties was attending the funeral of his predecessor, former senator Hawley. Senator Platt spoke in Hartford at the memorial for the man with whom he had served almost a quarter-century in the Senate, then returned to Washington. By some accounts, he caught a chill at the funeral; he fell ill and died on April 21, making Bulkeley the senior senator from Connecticut after seven weeks of service, a distinction Hawley had never attained in his four six-year terms. Platt was replaced by Fessenden's protege, Congressman Frank Brandegee.

Bulkeley had joined what became known as the "Millionaire's Senate", for the Senate of that time was filled with wealthy and powerful men, such as Henry A. du Pont of Delaware, Chauncey Depew of New York, and the father-in-law of John D. Rockefeller Jr., Nelson Aldrich of Rhode Island. Bulkeley was as wealthy as many of them, and when in 1906, Cosmopolitan listed fifty senators who were part of "the interests", it included Bulkeley.

A conservative, Bulkeley tended to oppose Roosevelt, of the progressive wing of the Republican Party. Roosevelt sought federal government spending for such programs as national parks and a Panama Canal; Bulkeley was less inclined to spend. He criticized Roosevelt's expansion of the federal government's powers, successfully opposing the president's attempts to regulate the insurance industry at the federal level. According to H. Roger Grant, who wrote Bulkeley's American National Biography article, Bulkeley feared the large New York insurance companies would dominate the federal regulatory structure. He also opposed administration efforts to lower tariffs on products from the U.S.-administered Philippine Islands, feeling importation of cheap tobacco from there would harm Connecticut's tobacco growers.

Bulkeley also opposed Roosevelt over the Brownsville affair, when a battalion of African-American U.S. soldiers were accused of shooting up the town of Brownsville, Texas, and none of them would say if any of the others were guilty. The entire battalion was discharged without honor by Roosevelt, outraging many in the African-American community, who normally supported Roosevelt. Senator Joseph B. Foraker of Ohio insisted on a Senate investigation. Although the official Senate committee report backed Roosevelt, and even the minority report found the evidence inconclusive, Foraker and Bulkeley signed a separate report stating that "the weight of the testimony shows that none of the soldiers of the Twenty-fifth U.S. Infantry participated in the shooting affray". Foraker paid for his unsuccessful battle against Roosevelt with his Senate seat; Bulkeley sat with Foraker after he left office at a meeting where the Ohioan was honored by Washington's African-American community. Bulkeley always felt that Roosevelt and the Secretary of War at the time, William Howard Taft, had treated the soldiers badly, and asked for a year's back pay for each, but this was never done, and Taft's election as president in 1908 ensured little was done at the time. In 1972, the Nixon administration reversed Roosevelt's actions and changed the discharges to honorable, in most cases posthumously (two soldiers were still living).

Bulkeley wanted to be re-elected in 1911, but his age (73 at the end of his term), a number of blunders he made (for example, insulting Idaho's Weldon B. Heyburn on the floor of the Senate), and the desire of rising state Republican political boss J. Henry Roraback to have the seat for former governor George P. McLean all worked against Bulkeley. Votes in local caucuses in 1910 favored McLean over Bulkeley, and by the time of the general election in November, he knew his Senate career would be over, but allowed his name to be put forward in the Republican legislative caucus in January 1911. On January 10, McLean defeated Bulkeley 113 votes to 64 in the caucus, and the endorsement was made unanimous. Bulkeley gave a statement saying that he would have won had there been a primary election, and that he intended to return to Hartford after his term expired on March 3 and devote himself to business.

== Later years, death and funeral ==
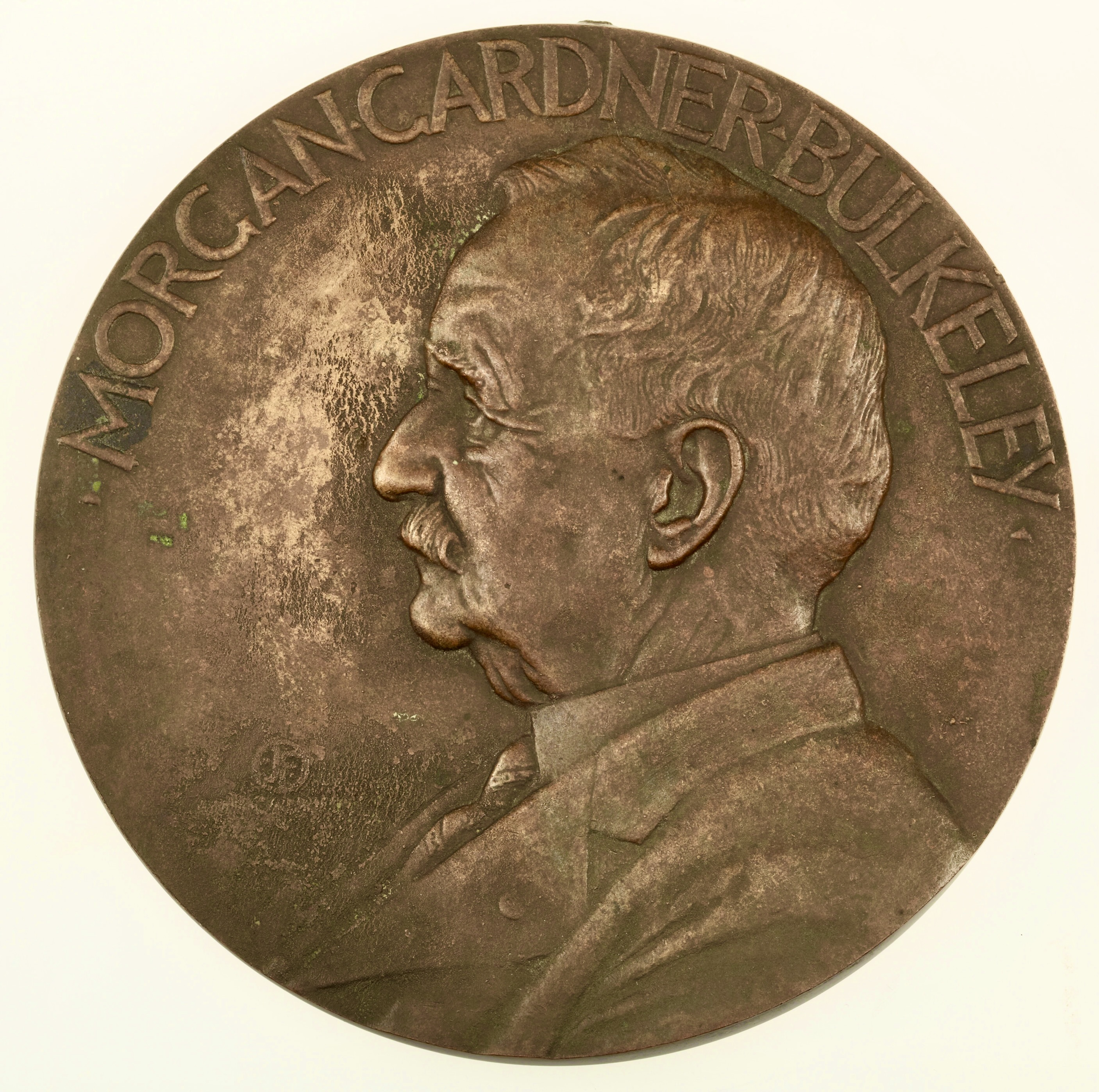
1896 medal honoring Bulkeley, by John Flanagan

Out of office, Bulkeley continued his presidency of Aetna. In September 1911, he was among the dignitaries invited to dine with Taft when the president visited Hartford. When the Hartford YMCA needed a new building, Bulkeley helped finance it by giving his employees raises and getting them to donate the money to the building fund. Bulkeley devoted much of his time in his final years to other philanthropic causes, taking the lead in raising money to save Hartford's Old State House. In 1916, Bulkeley was a guest of honor at a banquet celebrating the National League's 40th anniversary, with former president Taft the featured speaker. In 1919, he chaired a committee seeking a new site for Hartford's main post office.

Both of Bulkeley's sons and three of his nephews served in France during World War I, and Aetna employees bought almost $24 million in Liberty Loan bonds, purchases urged by the company president, "Get what is left in your vest pockets and turn them inside out; search your trousers' pockets and take what's left; even go into your stockings and give of your saving. Contribute liberally in this campaign that we are about to enter."

Bulkeley enjoyed general good health in his final years, suffering from occasional illness. In October 1922, he fell ill, and his doctor put him to bed on November 2. Four days later, he took a turn for the worse and his family was summoned to his bedside. He died in the evening of November 6, 1922, aged 84. The funeral was at the Bulkeley home in Hartford, with the honorary pallbearers including Senator Brandegee and Governor Everett J. Lake. Among those in attendance was John Heydler, president of the National League, which also sent a large floral piece. Interment was at Cedar Hill Cemetery in Hartford. The offices of Aetna were closed the day after the funeral, and for fifteen minutes at 2:30 that afternoon, all business ceased in the city of Hartford.

== Family, interests and sites ==
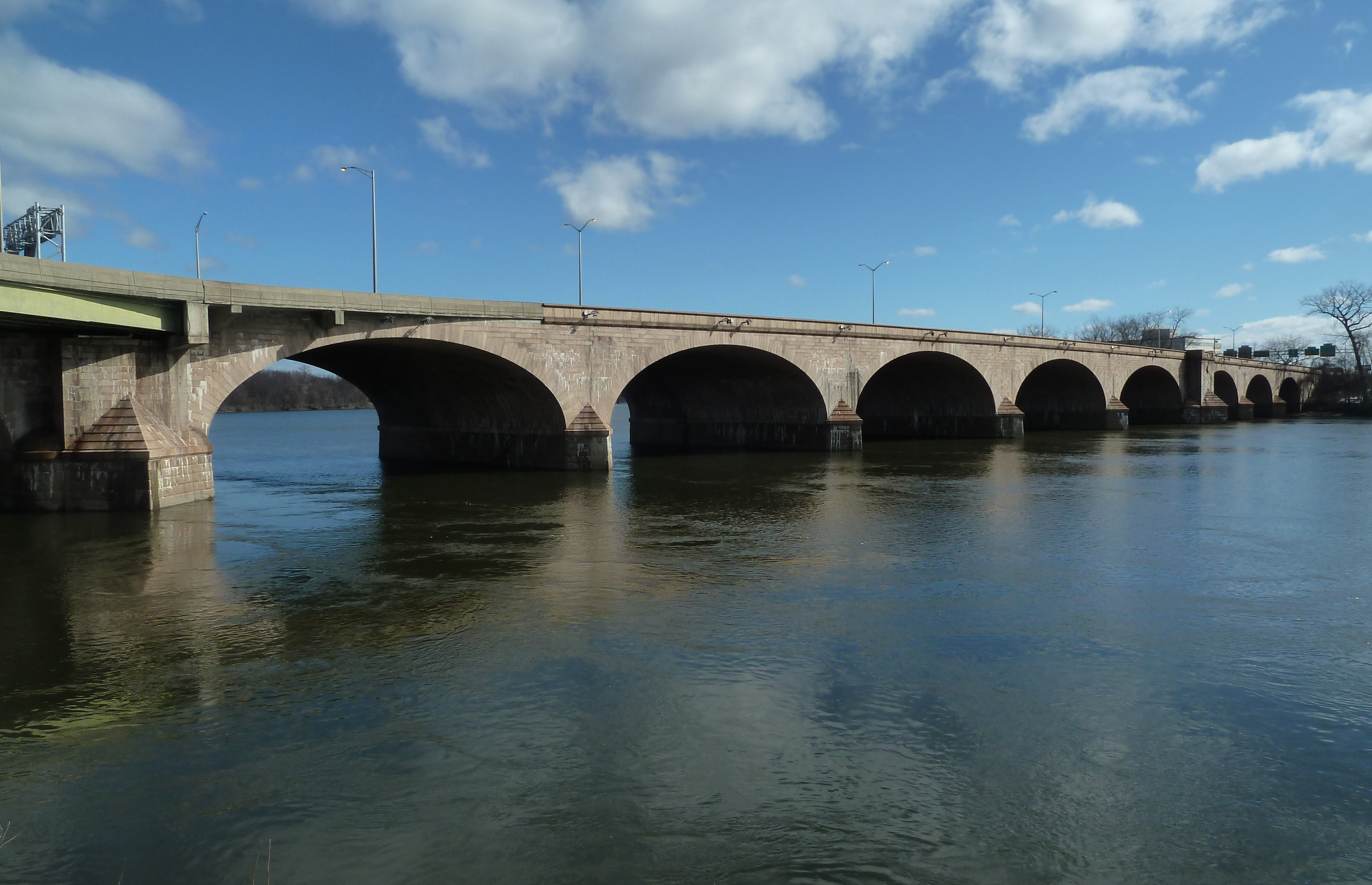
The Bulkeley Bridge, seen in 2013

In 1885, Bulkeley wed Fannie Briggs Houghton, they had three children. The elder son, Morgan Bulkeley Jr., was gassed in World War I and never regained his full health, dying at age 40 in 1926, leaving three children. The middle child, Elinor Bulkeley Ingersoll, died in 1964 at age 71, leaving four children. The younger son, Houghton, died in 1966 at age 69, leaving three children. Bulkeley's nephew via his younger sister Mary, Morgan B. Brainard, became president of Aetna after him, and served thirty-five years, meaning Aetna was led by a family member for all but seven years of its first century.

The Hartford Bridge over the Connecticut River was renamed the Bulkeley Bridge in his honor in 1922, after his death. The bridge carries Interstate 84 over the Connecticut River. Morgan G. Bulkeley High School, in Hartford, is also named for him. In 1928, Clarkin Field in Hartford was renamed Morgan G. Bulkeley Stadium in his honor; it was demolished in 1960. There is a Bulkeley Avenue in the city's west end. There was a small Bulkeley Park near the bridge; its former site is near the bridge's western approach.

In addition to his brief stint as National League president, Bulkeley was involved in sports as president of the harness racing association, the United States Trotting Association, for more than thirty years. Although he never owned horses which were raced, he was a regular attendee at the track and was a director of Charter Oak Park for many years, serving as president of the owners of Charter Oak Park, the Connecticut Stock Breeders' Association.

He was elected as commander of the Connecticut Department of the Grand Army of the Republic in 1903. He was for 20 years president of Connecticut's chapter of the Sons of the Revolution (SR).

== Assessment and historical view ==
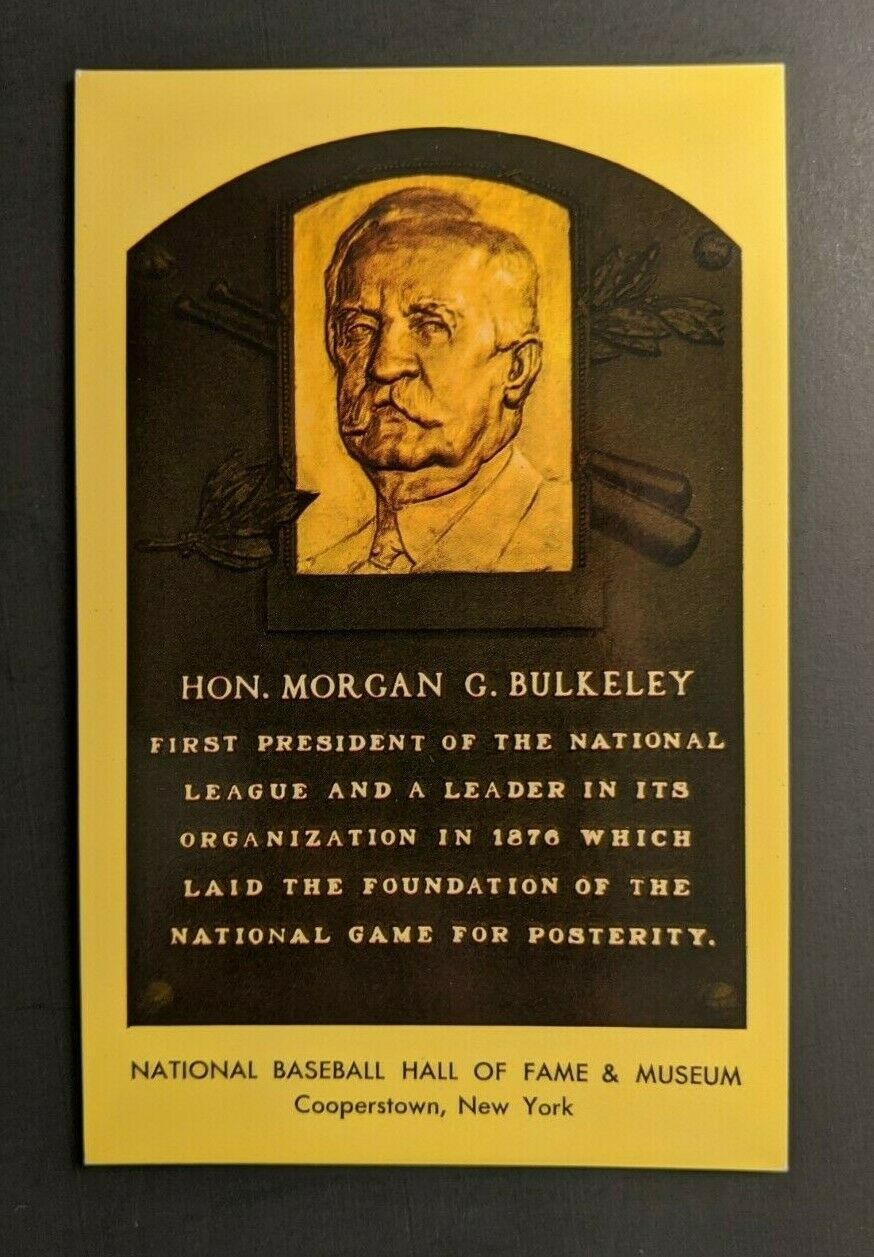
Post card depicting Bulkeley's Hall of Fame plaque

Bulkeley's biographer, Murphy, described his subject's life, "Beyond the dreams of most men—and for the greater part of his long life—he completely controlled his world. With courage and political savvy, Morgan Bulkeley hopscotched from great success in business and laudable accomplishments in community affairs to the realization of some rather robust political dreams." He deemed Bulkeley "one of the most powerful politicians Connecticut ever produced". During Bulkeley's presidency, Aetna became the largest life insurance company in the nation.

Bulkeley's election to the Baseball Hall of Fame in 1937, 15 years after his death, is controversial due to the brevity of his involvement in the game. The first president of the American League, Ban Johnson, a major figure in baseball for over twenty years, was inducted into the Hall of Fame at the same time by the Centennial Commission (appointed by Baseball Commissioner Kenesaw Mountain Landis), and the choices may be connected. The Centennial Commission selectees were chosen not only for their playing ability, but for their "pioneer inspiration". Some have suggested that Bulkeley is the least-deserving Hall of Fame inductee—Krell stated that Bulkeley's induction was "largely to the consternation of 19th century baseball enthusiasts". Goldfarb wrote, "it was more of a 'political' decision than a baseball one: as American League founder and president Ban Johnson had been chosen for induction at that time, it was felt that the National League also needed to be represented". Krell noted that Bulkeley was elected league president to give credibility to the new league and suggested, "Those who disagree with his Hall of Fame credentials must first consider whether the National League would have been successful without him."

According to Jeff Jacobs of the Hartford Courant in his 2014 article on Bulkeley, "The Crowbar Governor—how great is that nickname?—stands out as the premier sportsman of the first half of [the Courant's] existence [1764–1889]." A 1939 article in the Courant deemed Bulkeley "one of the most illustrious men ever to be born in Connecticut ... His philanthropies were legend."

Murphy stated of Bulkeley,

He was shrewd, pragmatic, sometimes wildly vindictive—but he was also courteous, loyal, and even kind. He wasn't a "man for all seasons," but he accomplished an enormous amount without receiving even a high school diploma. In the pantheon of Connecticut politics, he has his own special place. Love him or hate him, he remains one of the most interesting and complex politicians Connecticut has ever produced.

== Sources ==
- Argersinger, Peter H. (June 1989). "The Value of the Vote: Political Representation in the Gilded Age". The Journal of American History. 76 (1): 59–90. doi:10.2307/1908344. JSTOR 1908344. S2CID 155824257.
- Burpee, Charles W. (1928). History of Hartford County, Connecticut, 1633–1928. S.J. Clarke Publishing Co. OCLC 49335309.
- Fleitz, David L. (2015). Ghosts in the Gallery at Cooperstown: Sixteen Little-Known Members of the Hall of Fame. McFarland & Co. ISBN 978-0-7864-8061-6.
- Hooker, Richard (1956). Ætna Life Insurance Company: Its First Hundred Years, a History. Ætna Life Insurance Company. OCLC 1240246222.
- Krell, David (2015). "Morgan Bulkeley: Founding father or figurehead?". Base Ball. 9: 45–52.
- Lembeck, Harry (2015). Taking on Theodore Roosevelt: How One Senator Defied the President on Brownsville and Shook American Politics. Prometheus Books. ISBN 978-1-61614-955-0.
- Macdonald, Neil W. (2004). The League That Lasted: 1876 and the Founding of the National League of Professional Base Ball Clubs. McFarland & Co. ISBN 978-0-7864-1755-1.
- Murphy, Kevin (2011). Crowbar Governor: The Life and Times of Morgan Gardner Bulkeley. Wesleyan University Press. ISBN 978-0-8195-7075-8.
- Osborn, Norris G., ed. (1906). Men of Mark in Connecticut (PDF). William R. Goodspeed. OCLC 9411911.
- Ryczek, William J. (2016) [1992]. Blackguards and Red Stockings: A History of Baseball's National Association, 1871–1875 (revised ebook ed.). McFarland. ISBN 978-1-4766-2552-2.
- Thorn, John (March 15, 2011). Baseball in the Garden of Eden: the Secret History of the Early Game (ebook ed.). Simon & Schuster. ISBN 978-1-4391-7021-2.
- Weaver, John D. (1997). The Senator and the Sharecropper's Son: Exoneration of the Brownsville Soldiers. Texas A&M University Press. ISBN 978-0-89096-748-5.

Party political offices
Preceded by Phineas C. Lounsbury	Republican nominee for Governor of Connecticut; 1888	Succeeded by Samuel E. Merwin
Political offices
Preceded by Phineas C. Lounsbury	Governor of Connecticut; 1889–1893	Succeeded by Luzon B. Morris
U.S. Senate
Preceded by Joseph R. Hawley	U.S. senator (Class 1) from Connecticut; 1905–1911; Served alongside: Orville H. Platt, Frank B. Brandegee	Succeeded by George P. McLean
