= Bacon Academy =

Location
- 611 Norwich Avenue; Colchester, Connecticut 06415; United States; 41°34′28″N 72°18′10″W

Information
- Established: 1803 (223 years ago)
- CEEB code: 070110
- Principal: Amy Begué
- Grades: 9-12
- Enrollment: 759 (2018–19)
- Athletics conference: Eastern Connecticut Conference
- Mascot: Bobcats
- Website: ba.colchesterct.org

Bacon Academy is a public high school in Colchester, Connecticut, in the United States.

In 1800 a prominent Colchester farmer, Pierpont Bacon, died and left an endowment of thirty-five thousand dollars (with buying power equivalent to that of about two million dollars in 2009). The endowment was to the

inhabitants of the First Society of Colchester for the purpose of supporting and maintaining a school…for the instruction of Youth in Reading and writing English, in Arithmetic, Mathimaticks, and the Languages, or such other branches of Learning.

This established the academy that bears his name. Bacon Academy's doors opened to the children of Colchester on the first of November 1803 and from that point forward, prepared many young men and women for the life that lay ahead.

== History ==
In its early days, Bacon Academy had a reputation of preparing its students for accomplishment at universities and colleges around the country. Local children attended the school without charge for tuition. The status of the Academy was high in the minds of many prominent fathers of the nineteenth century.

The trustees established an academic year of three terms: the first term started in September and ended in December, the second ran from January to April, and the third, from May to August. Early class rolls show that the number of local students would fall in planting and harvesting seasons, many students skipping semesters or returning either late in the first term or leaving early in the second and not attending the Academy at all during the third.

Early Bacon students were neither given a diploma nor graduated after four years, as they generally are today. Instead, the school had a system divided into three branches. In the first branch, a young student learned such subjects as languages, English grammar, and mathematics. In the second branch, he or she would be taught writing, geometry, and rhetoric. The last branch was similar to the common or grammar school. Age never factored into a student's placement or progress; some students would leave Bacon at fifteen or sixteen if they had completed all three branches. In 1886, the branch structure was abandoned for the current four-year system; and by 1890, the first modern commencement was held, with each graduated student receiving a diploma.

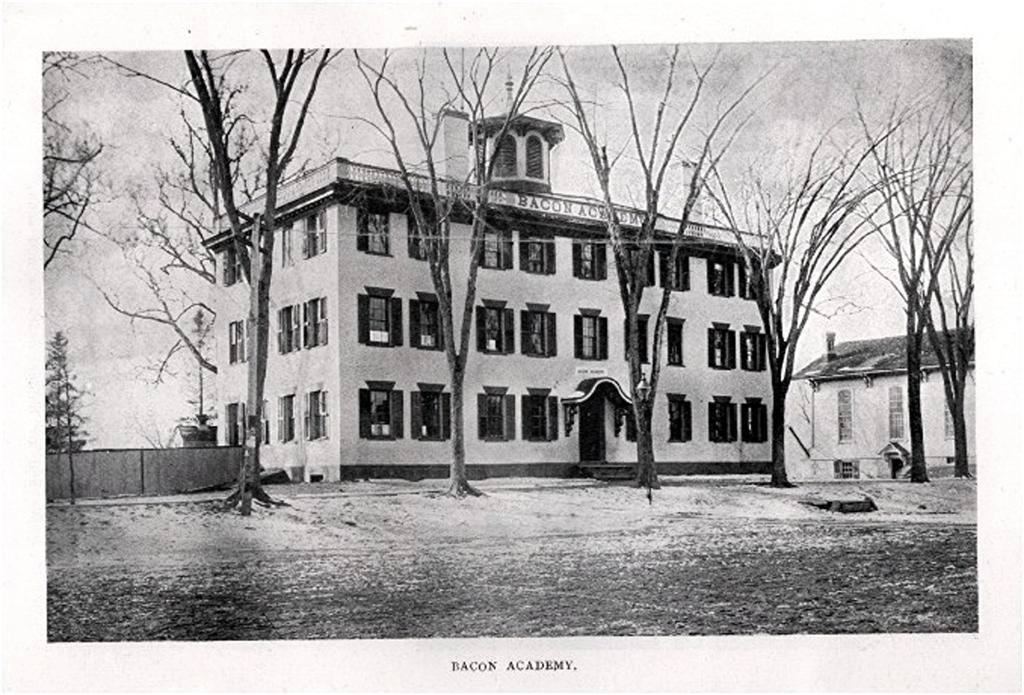
The school building in 1896 ...

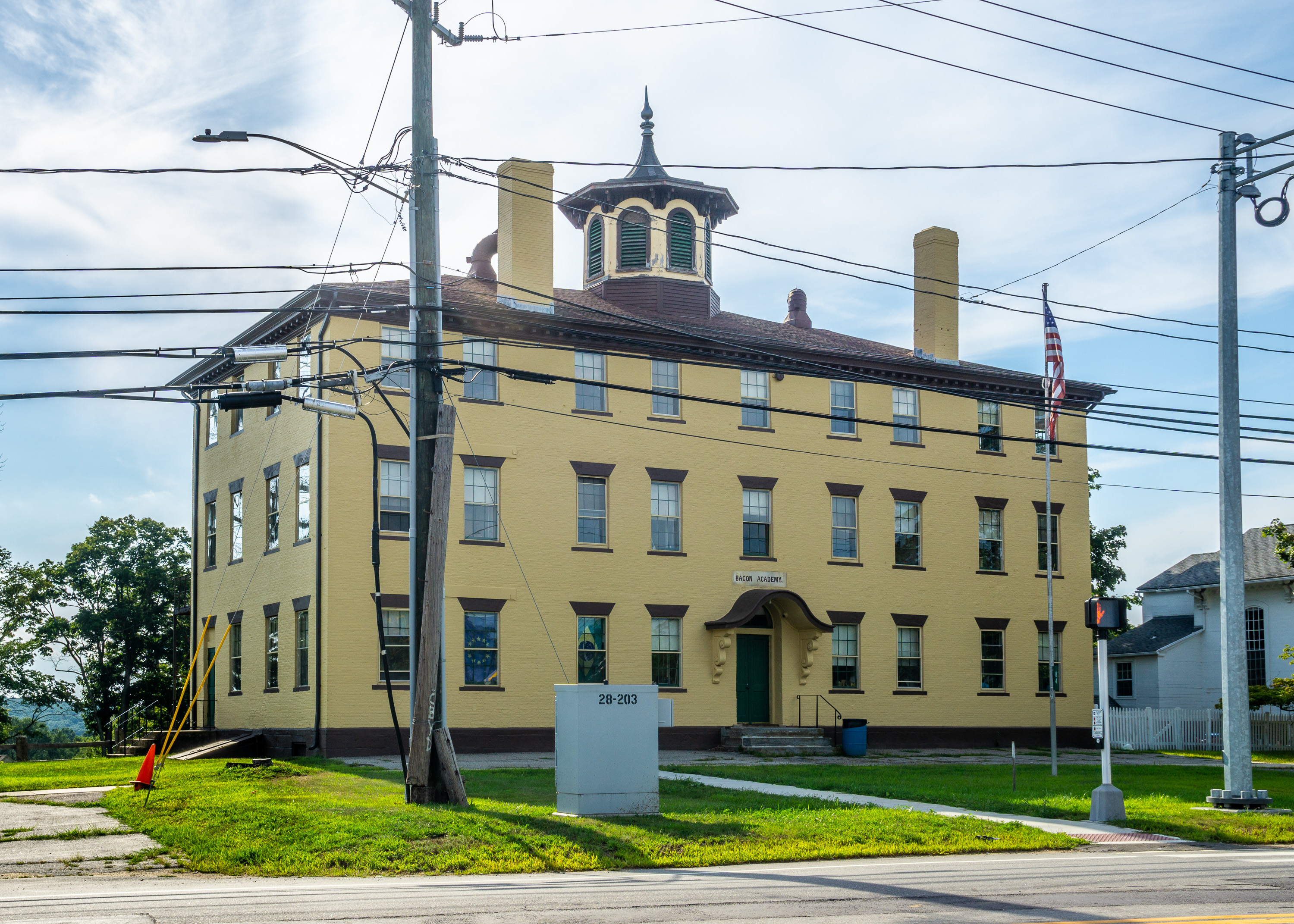
... and in 2020

The school bell would toll at five-thirty in the morning during the first and third term and at seven in the winter. Students were chosen each day to practice public speaking in front of instructors and others. Following the speeches came Morning Prayer. Afterward, the preceptor (the principal of the Academy) would give an exhortation. This routine was eliminated after 1846.

Life as a Bacon student was strict. In or out of classes, each was to behave properly and dress neatly—or risk punishment by means of "reproof, correction, admonition, or expulsion." At home, students usually studied when not working on their fathers’ farms or doing chores for their boarding masters.

After the centennial celebration, the national reputation of the school declined and the Academy drew its students chiefly from Colchester and surrounding towns. In time, Bacon became simply the public high school for the Town of Colchester. By 1962, the students had become too numerous for the then 160-year-old building on Main Street, and they were moved to a new schoolhouse adjacent to the grammar school. A major building spurt in the 1980s again impelled construction of a new high school, less than a mile east; the doors opened at the present site in 1993.

Bacon Academy celebrated its bicentennary in 2003, commencing the celebration with a special concert by the Bacon Academy Bands led by director Thomas Kessler. Other events included an all-class reunion, a golf tournament, and an open house at each of the buildings that ever had housed the Academy.

== Sports ==
The Bacon Academy sports teams are members of the Eastern Connecticut Conference (ECC).

The Bobcats have a rivalry with RHAM High School (Hebron, Connecticut) in football. The 2 schools play an annual football game on Thanksgiving Day that cumulates with the handing out of “The Rail”. “The Rail” is a piece of railroad track that symbolizes the Airline Rail that used to run between the towns of Colchester and Hebron.

On March 17, 2012, the varsity girls basketball team won the Class L State Championship with a 38-34 victory over top-seeded E.O. Smith at Mohegan Sun Arena. Head coach Dave Shea, a 1952 Bacon Academy graduate, won his 660th career game (331 with the girls) at Bacon Academy. Also, the girls basketball team finished third in Connecticut in the final 2012 New Haven Register State Poll.

== Notable alumni ==
- Stephen F. Austin — The "father of Texas"
- William Alfred Buckingham — Governor and Republican Senator for Connecticut
- Eliphalet Adams Bulkeley — First president of Aetna Insurance Company
- Morgan Bulkeley — Mayor of Hartford, Governor of Connecticut, Republican Senator for Connecticut from 1905–1911, and a member of the Baseball Hall of Fame
- J. Cleaveland Cady — architect
- Jonathan Coulton — singer-songwriter
- William J. Johnston — recipient of the Medal of Honor
- Edwin D. Morgan — Governor of New York, U.S. Senator
- Lewis E. Stanton — United States Attorney for the District of Connecticut
- Lyman Trumbull — U.S. Senator of Illinois and co-author of the Thirteenth Amendment to the United States Constitution.
- Morrison Remick Waite — Supreme Court Justice
- Ron Wotus — Major League Baseball player
- Arthur Williams Wright — received first PhD in science granted outside Europe
