= Coventry Health Care =

Health insurer in the United States

- Type: Defunct
- Industry: Health insurance
- Founded: 1986; 40 years ago
- Defunct: May 7, 2013
- Fate: Acquired by Aetna
- Headquarters: North Bethesda, Maryland (Bethesda mailing address)
- Key people: Allen Wise (CEO)
- Revenue: ▲US$ 14.113 billion (2012)
- Operating income: ▼US$ 759.69 million (2012)
- Net income: ▼US$ 487.06 million (2012)
- Total assets: ▼US$ 8.750 billion (2012)
- Total equity: ▲US$ 4.722 billion (2012)
- Number of employees: 14,400 (January 2013)

Coventry Health Care, Inc. was a health insurer in the United States. It had 3.7 million medical members, 1.5 million Medicare Part D members, and 900,000 Medicaid members. In May 2013, the company was acquired by Aetna for $5.7 billion.

== History ==
The company was founded in 1986 in Nashville by Phil Bredesen.

In August 1998, the company merged with Principal Health Care and moved its headquarters to Bethesda, Maryland.

In October 2000, the company acquired WellPath, the managed care subsidiary of Duke University Health System, for $20.7 million.

In October 2010, the company acquired MHP (Mercy Health Plans), an insurer with approximately 180,000 members in Missouri and northwest Arkansas.

In January 2012, the company acquired Children's Mercy's Family Health Partners.

In May 2013, the company was acquired by Aetna for $5.7 billion, who then outsourced all IT work and laid off thousands of key personnel.
