= Charles W. Burpee =

American newspaper editor (1859–1945)

Charles Winslow Burpee (13 November 1859, Rockville, Connecticut – 13 May 1945) was an American newspaper editor.

== Early life ==
Burpee attended Rockville (Connecticut) High School, and graduated from Yale in 1883. Like his brother Lucius Francis Burpee, he was a member of Skull and Bones. He was also chairman of the editorial board of the Yale Daily News during his senior year.

== Career ==
He was city editor of the Waterbury American, from 1883 to 1891, and then removed to Bridgeport, where he became a part owner of the Bridgeport Standard. He left the Standard in 1895 to become state editor of the Hartford Courant, of which he was managing editor from 1900 to 1904. He left newspapers in 1904, to become head of the educational and editorial departments of the Phoenix Mutual Life Insurance Company of Hartford. He remained at this company until 1935. In 1930 he became editor of The Hartford Times, a position he held for five years.

Burpee also was active in the military. In 1892, he was appointed adjutant of the 4th Regiment, in Bridgeport. In the same year, he was made captain of Company K of the 4th Regiment. He was also inspector of small arms practice on the staff of the 1st Regiment in Hartford. He retired in 1897, with the rank of captain.

He served as a volunteer aide on the staff of the 1st Regiment of the Connecticut Volunteer Infantry, in the early part of the Spanish war. He enlisted in the 1st Regiment of the Connecticut National Guard during the Spanish–American War, and became a 2nd lieutenant in Company A, 2nd Regiment.

He was historian of the First Regiment, and author of Military History of Waterbury (1891); History of Hartford County (1928); A Century in Hartford (1931); Connecticut in Colonial Wars (1933) and Story of Connecticut, (1939).

Burpee was member of the Sons of the American Revolution and the Twilight Club of Hartford.

== Personal life ==
Burpee's parents were Thomas F. Burpee and Adeline M. Harwood.

He married Bertha Stiles, said to be a descendant of Yale President Ezra Stiles, on November 5, 1885, and they had one son, Stiles Burpee.
