= George G. Sumner =

American politician (1841–1906)

61st Lieutenant Governor of Connecticut
- In office January 3, 1883 – January 8, 1885
- Governor: Thomas M. Waller
- Preceded by: William H. Bulkeley
- Succeeded by: Lorrin A. Cooke

Personal details
- Born: January 14, 1841
- Died: September 20, 1906 (aged 65)
- Party: Democratic Party
- Spouse: Julia Ella Gallup Sumner
- Children: William Gallup Sumner; Julia Ella Sumner

George G. Sumner (January 14, 1841 – September 20, 1906) was an American politician who was the 61st Lieutenant Governor of Connecticut from 1883 to 1885.

== Early and personal life ==
Sumner was born in Hebron, Connecticut, on January 14, 1841. A native of Bolton, Connecticut, he moved to Hartford as a young man, was admitted to the bar in 1864 and began to practice law. He married Julia Ella Gallup and they had two children, William Gallup Sumner and Julia Ella Sumner.

== Career ==
Elected to the Connecticut House of Representatives as a Democrat in 1867, Sumner served as representative for Bolton. He was elected mayor of Hartford in 1878 in a race against Morgan Bulkeley, who would succeed Sumner as mayor and later become governor of Connecticut. He was mayor from 1878 until 1880.

In 1882, he was nominated for Lieutenant Governor of Connecticut on the ticket with Thomas M. Waller and was elected by a large majority. It was the personal popularity of Sumner who carried the ticket through. Waller and Sumner served for one period, from January 3, 1883, to January 8, 1885.

Sumner was a member of the Connecticut State Senate for the 1st District from 1887 to 1888.

== Death ==
Sumner died in a hospital at Hartford, Hartford County, Connecticut, on September 20, 1906 (age 65 years, 249 days). He is interred at Cedar Hill Cemetery, Hartford, Connecticut.

Political offices
Preceded by William H. Bulkeley	Lieutenant Governor of Connecticut; 1883-1885	Succeeded by Lorrin A. Cooke
