= Eliphalet Adams Bulkeley =

American politician and business executive (1802–1873)

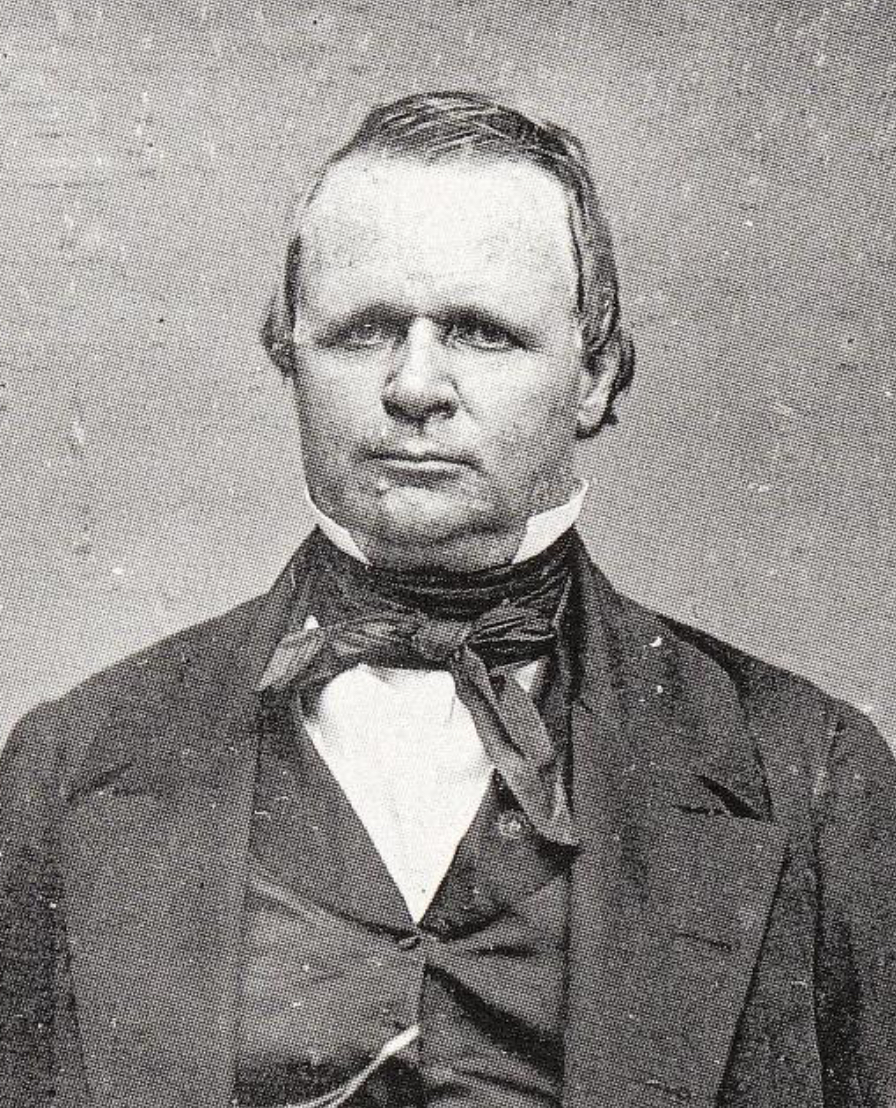
- 1850s daguerreotype of Bulkeley by Augustus Washington

Speaker of the Connecticut House of Representatives
- In office 1857
- Preceded by: Green Kendrick
- Succeeded by: Alfred A. Burnham

Member of the Connecticut House of Representatives from Hartford
- In office 1857

Member of the Connecticut Senate from the 19th District
- In office 1838–1840

Member of the Connecticut House of Representatives from East Haddam
- In office 1834–1838

Personal details
- Born: June 20, 1803 Colchester, Connecticut, U.S.
- Died: February 13, 1872 (age 68) Hartford, Connecticut, U.S.
- Children: At least 5
- Education: Yale University (BA, LLB)

Eliphalet Adams Bulkeley (June 20, 1803 – February 13, 1872) was an American business executive, politician, and first president of the Aetna Insurance Company. He was a member of both chambers of the Connecticut General Assembly and was the speaker of the Connecticut House of Representatives in 1857.

== Life and career ==
Bulkeley was born June 20, 1803, in Colchester, Connecticut, the son of Sarah (Taintor) and John Charles Bulkeley. He attended Bacon Academy. Bulkeley earned his Bachelor's and law degree from Yale University and practiced law in Lebanon, Connecticut and Selma, Alabama. Bulkeley later moved to East Haddam, Connecticut, where he worked as a banker, town representative, member and Speaker of the Connecticut House of Representatives, state's attorney, and judge.

Bulkeley became the president of the Connecticut Mutual Life Insurance Company, founded in 1846, the first life insurance company in Connecticut. In 1847, Bulkeley became director and general counsel of the Aetna Insurance Company. In 1850, when a subsidiary, Annuity Fund, was formed to sell life insurance, Bulkeley was named its administrative head.

When Annuity Fund was reorganized in 1853 as the Aetna Life Insurance Company, Bulkeley became its first president. When the Panic of 1857 caused many Aetna stockholders to talk of dissolving the company, Bulkeley refused.

Bulkeley was elected speaker of the Connecticut House of Representatives in 1857.

In 1861, the insurance industry again suffered a downturn; rather than pull back, however, Bulkeley embarked on a more aggressive marketing campaign which proved prescient when interest in life insurance soared during the war, and Aetna became one of America's leading life insurance companies. Bulkeley had at least five children, not including two who died in childbirth, including Mary Morgan (1831-1835, who died at the age of four), Charles (1835-1864, who died in the Civil War) and Morgan Bulkeley (1837-1922, who served as Mayor of Hartford, Governor of Connecticut, and U.S. Senator from Connecticut).

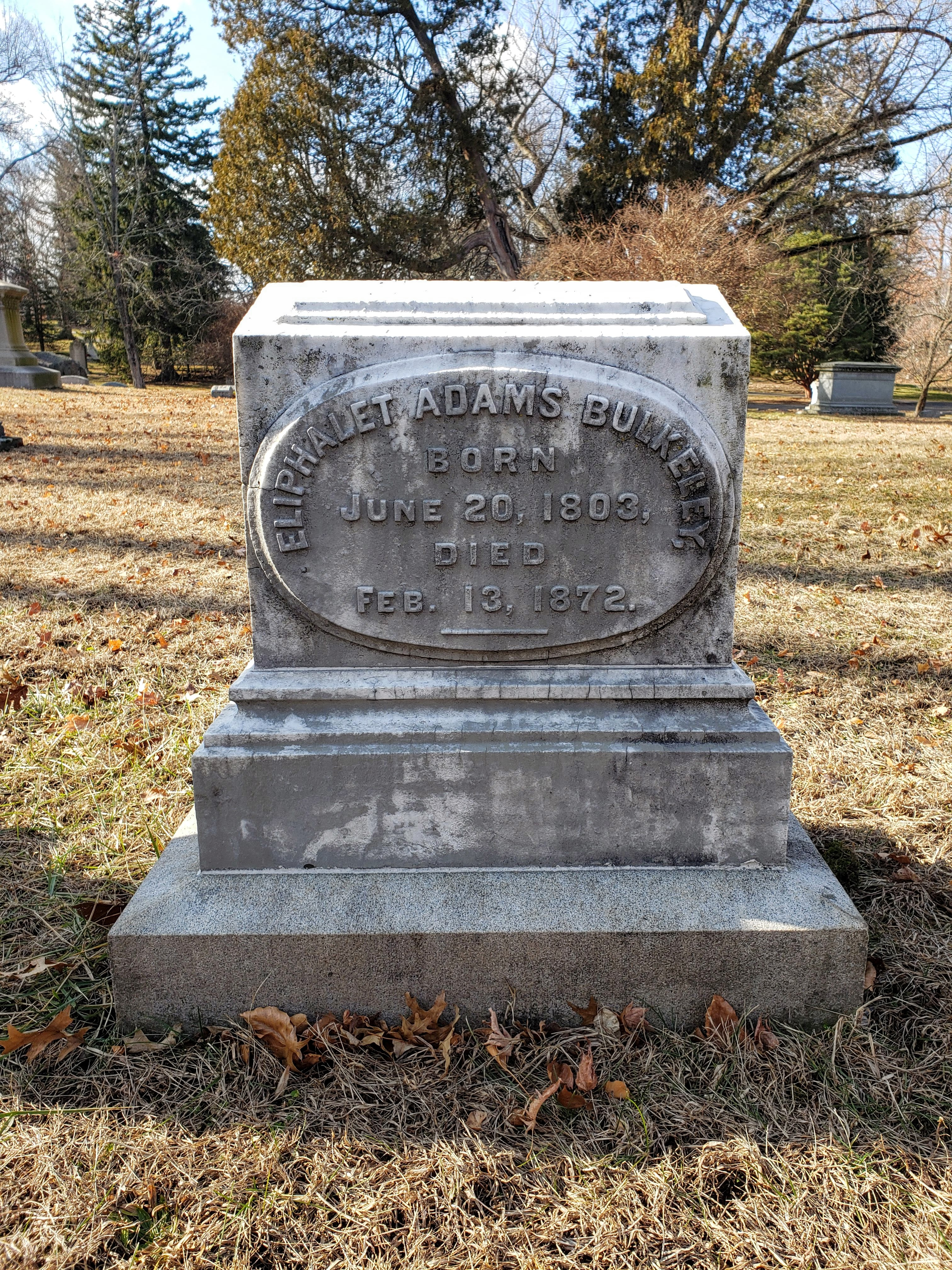
Eliphalet Adams Bulkeley gravestone in Cedar Hill Cemetery

Bulkeley died on February 13, 1872, in Hartford, Connecticut, aged 68.
