= Aetna =

American insurance company

Aetna Inc.

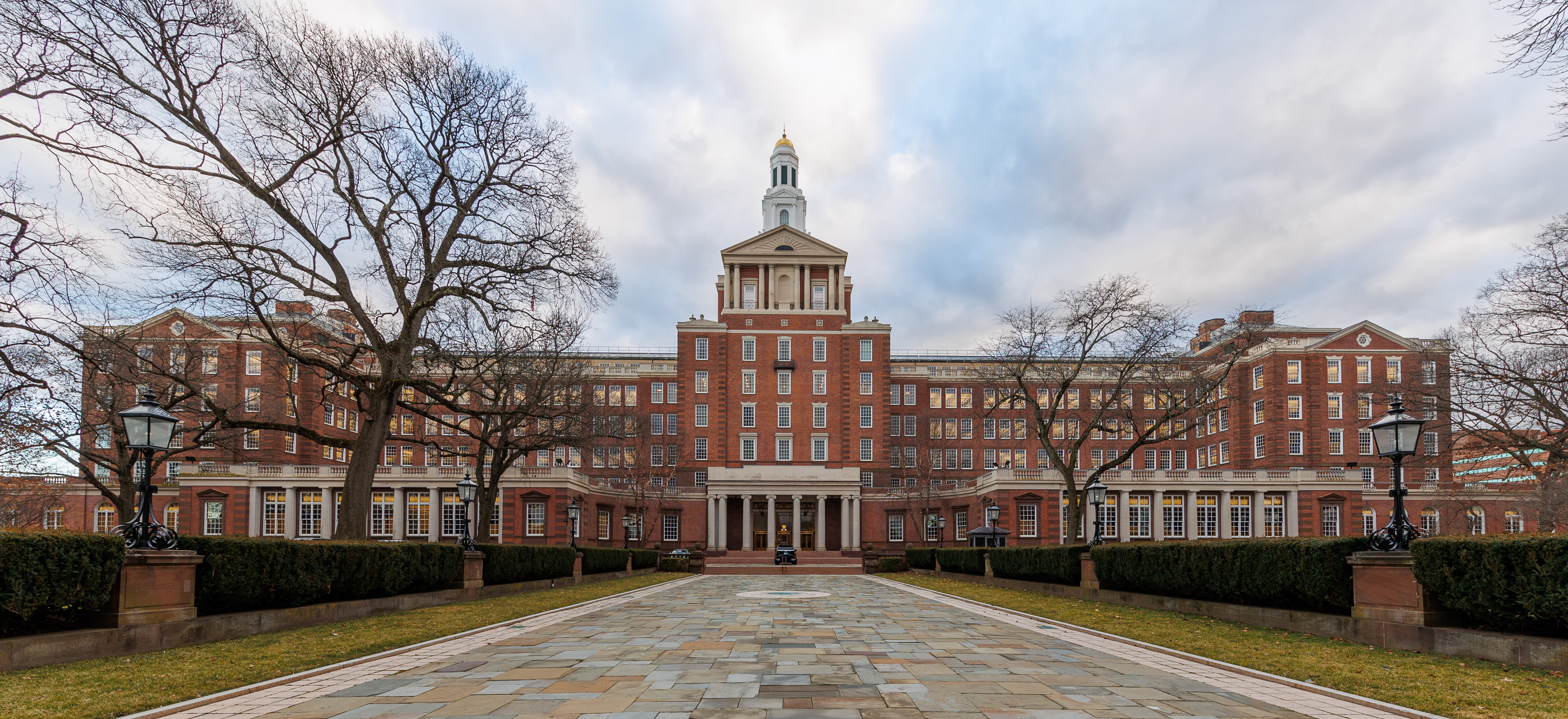
- Aetna headquarters in Hartford, Connecticut.
- Trade name: Aetna
- Type: Subsidiary
- Traded as: NYSE: AET (until 2018)
- Industry: Managed health care
- Founded: May 28, 1853; 173 years ago (as Aetna Life Insurance Company)
- Founder: Eliphalet Adams Bulkeley
- Headquarters: 151 Farmington Avenue; Hartford, Connecticut; 06156
- Area served: United States and expatriates
- Key people: David Joyner (CEO, CVS Health); Steve Nelson (President of Aetna)
- Products: Health insurance
- Revenue: $60.6 billion (2018)
- Number of employees: 47,950 (2018)
- Parent: CVS Health (2018–present)
- Subsidiaries: Aetna Better Health; Active Health Management; Aetna International; First Health PPO Network; Meritain Health
- Website: www.aetna.com

Aetna Inc. (/ˈɛtnə/ ET-nə) is an American managed health care company that sells traditional and consumer-directed health care insurance and related services, such as medical, pharmaceutical, dental, behavioral health, long-term care, and disability plans, primarily through employer-paid (fully or partly) insurance and benefit programs, and through Medicare. Since November 28, 2018, the company has been a subsidiary of CVS Health.

The company's network includes 22.1 million medical members, 12.7 million dental members, 13.1 million pharmacy benefit management services members, 1.2 million health-care professionals, over 690,000 primary care doctors and specialists, and over 5,700 hospitals.

Aetna is descended from Aetna (Fire) Insurance Company of Hartford, Connecticut. The name of the company is based on Mount Etna (originally spelled in Latin as Aetna), at the time the most active volcano in Europe. In 2026, the company received $117 million judgement against it for medical fraud.

== Timeline ==
=== 1800s ===
- 1819: Thomas Kimberly Brace became the principal founder and developer of the Aetna (Fire) Insurance Company, established in Hartford. One of his co-founders was Joseph Morgan, father of Junius Spencer Morgan and grandfather of J. P. Morgan. Brace served as the company's first President (and would remain on the Board of Directors until his death in 1860). Henry Leavitt Ellsworth, Yale graduate and attorney, became the second president of Aetna (Fire) Insurance Company, succeeding Thomas Kimberly Brace. Ellsworth, who later became the first U.S. Patent Commissioner, served as Aetna's president until 1821, when he resigned. He continued as a director at the company for another 16 years. Ellsworth's brother, William Wolcott Ellsworth, also served as a director, as well as the company's first general counsel.
- 1820: Brace authored the rewriting of the company Charter allowing Aetna to underwrite life insurance and annuities, earning Brace the title of "father" of American life insurance.
- On May 28, 1853, the Annuity department separated from Aetna Insurance to be incorporated as the Aetna Life Insurance Company, with Eliphalet Bulkeley as president. The fire insurance company went on to become part of Connecticut General, which merged into Cigna.
- On November 29, 1853, J. B. Bennett was appointed general agent of the company.
- 1854: Aetna hired its first full-time employee, Thomas O. Enders, who later became president of the company.
- 1857: Aetna moved to new offices on Hungerford and Cone Streets in Hartford. The Panic of 1857 caused the closing of many businesses. Eliphalet Bulkeley blocked a move to liquidate the company during the economic downturn.
- During the 1850s, The Aetna Insurance Company issued life insurance policies on an undetermined number of African-American slaves, naming their owners as beneficiaries.

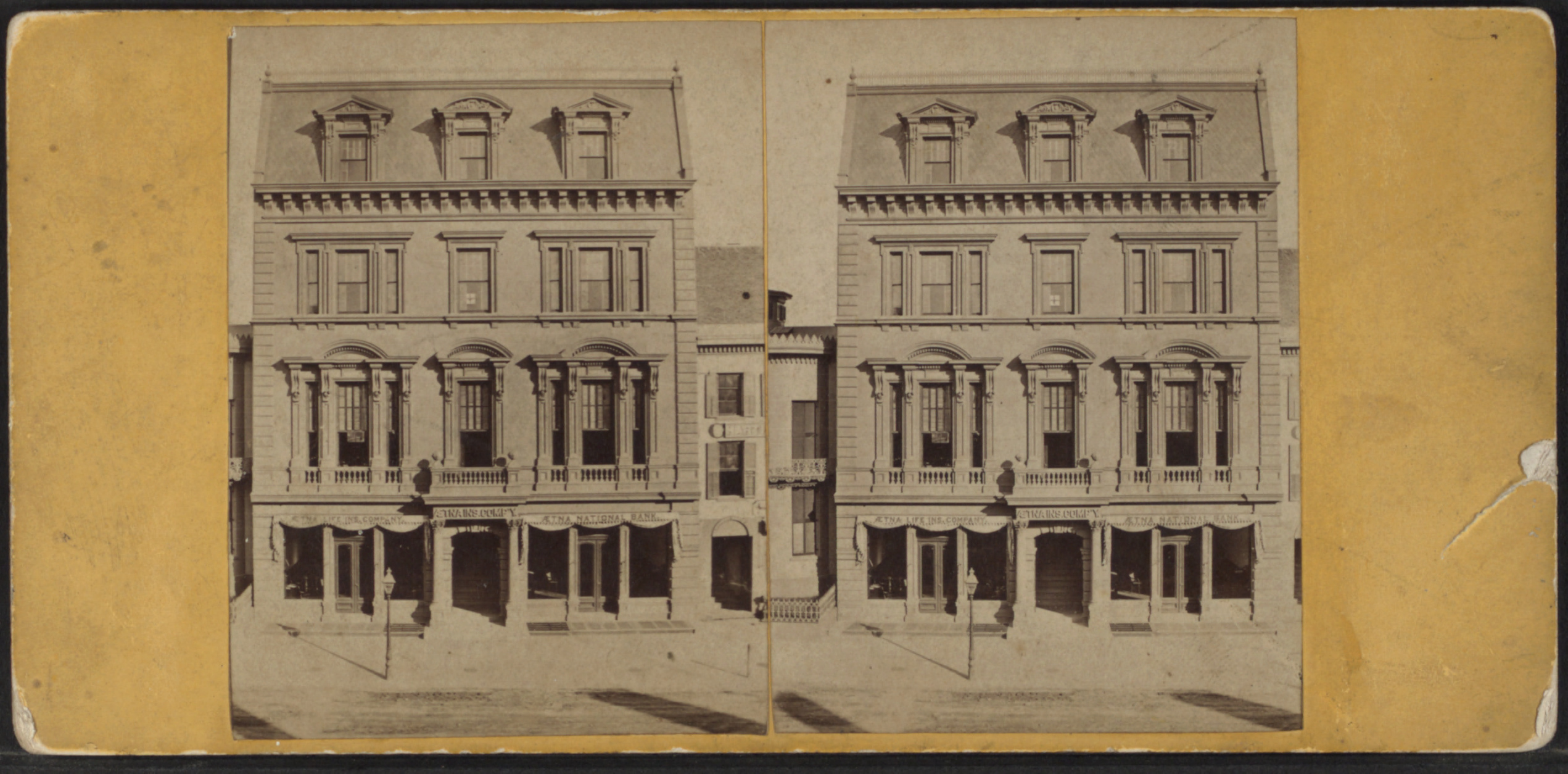
Aetna Insurance Company and Aetna National Bank, Hartford, Conn, stereoscopic view, c. 1860

- 1861: Aetna began offering life insurance policies which paid dividends to policyholders just as the mutual life insurance policies did. Aetna introduced its new service with higher commissions for its agents. Life insurance policy sales grew during the American Civil War.
- 1864: By 1864, Aetna had increased its volume of business by 600% over 1861 and its annual premium income exceeded one million dollars.
- 1865: Due to the increased financial resources, by 1865 Aetna met the stringent regulatory requirements placed on life insurance companies in Massachusetts and New York and was authorized to begin soliciting business in these states.
- 1867: Company income rose from $78,000 in 1861 to $5.129 million by 1867. Aetna moved to its third home office at 670 Main Street, Hartford.
- 1868: Aetna altered its business practices, hiring its first actuary and abandoning the half-note premium system in favor of an all-cash premium plan.
- 1872: Eliphalet A. Bulkeley died and Thomas O. Enders became president.
- 1878: Aetna increased its capitalization from $150,000 to $750,000.
- 1879: Enders resigned as president and Eliphalet Bulkeley's son Morgan G. Bulkeley replaced him.
- 1888: Aetna purchased its fourth home office at 650 Main Street. It was the first building Aetna actually owned, and Aetna's home office for the next 42 years.
- 1891: Aetna issued its first accident policy to Morgan Bulkeley.
- 1892: Aetna held its first general agents conference in Chicago.
- 1899: Aetna began offering health insurance policies.

=== 1900s ===
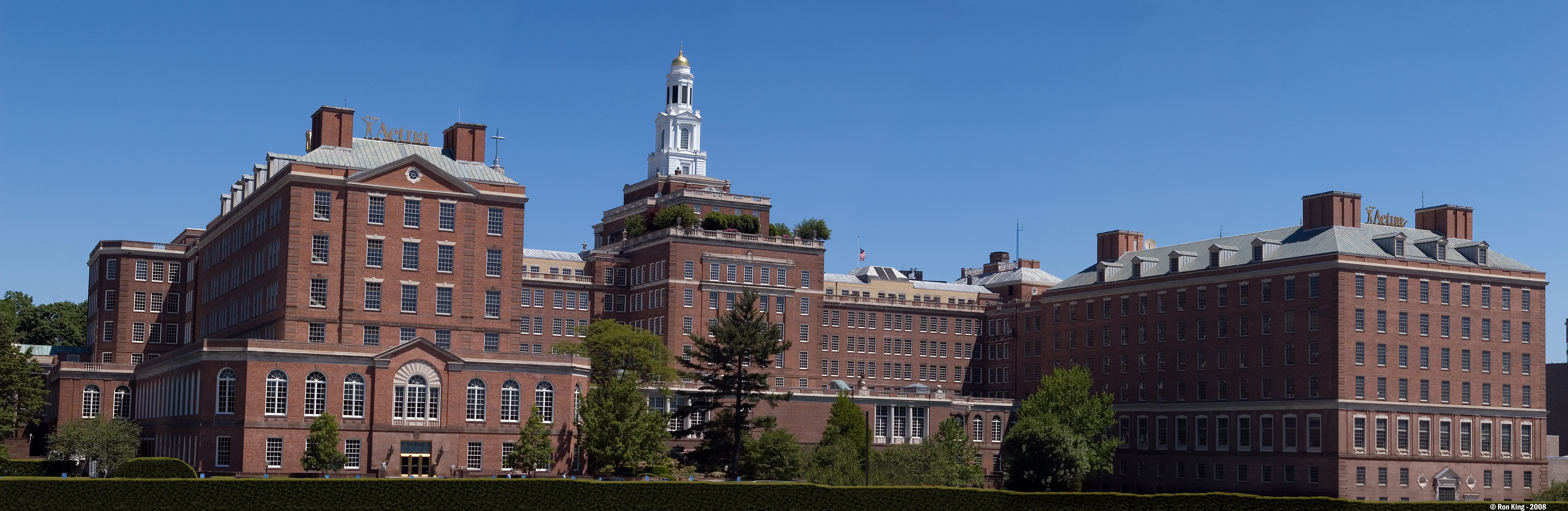
The Aetna headquarters building in Hartford was designed by James Gamble Rogers in 1931, and is the largest Colonial Revival building in the world. The bank vault was designed by Frederick S. Holmes.

- 1902: Aetna created an Accident and Liability department to offer employers' liability and workmen's collective insurance, alongside the growing strength of the Progressive social reform movement. This would become the cornerstone of the Aetna Accident and Liability Company.
- 1903: An Engineering and Inspection Division was created to improve workplace safety.
- 1904: Aetna introduced its first corporate seal. The logo portrayed the company's home office bursting out from within a globe, with large block typeface spelling out Aetna's ranking.
- 1907: Aetna began offering automobile insurance. This business developed into the Aetna Casualty and Surety Company.
- 1908: Aetna hired its first home office female employee, Julia Kinghorn, a telephone switchboard operator.
- 1910: Under the management of E. E. Cammack, Aetna began using Hollerith punched cards machines for tabulating and hired 35 women to input mortality statistics on keypunch machines, the company's first female home office clerks.
- 1911: Aetna began its first national advertising campaign. The same year, Aetna formed a bond department to market fidelity and surety coverages.
- 1912: Aetna introduced the first combination automobile policy, with several separate types of coverage combined into one contract. Several Aetna insureds were killed on the RMS Titanic.
- 1913: Aetna formed its second affiliate, the Automobile Insurance Company, to write fire insurance on cars. This soon expanded to include windstorm, tornado, leasehold, and ocean and inland marine insurance. Aetna formed a Group department to sell group life insurance.
- 1917: Aetna's name changes to Aetna Casualty and Surety Co.

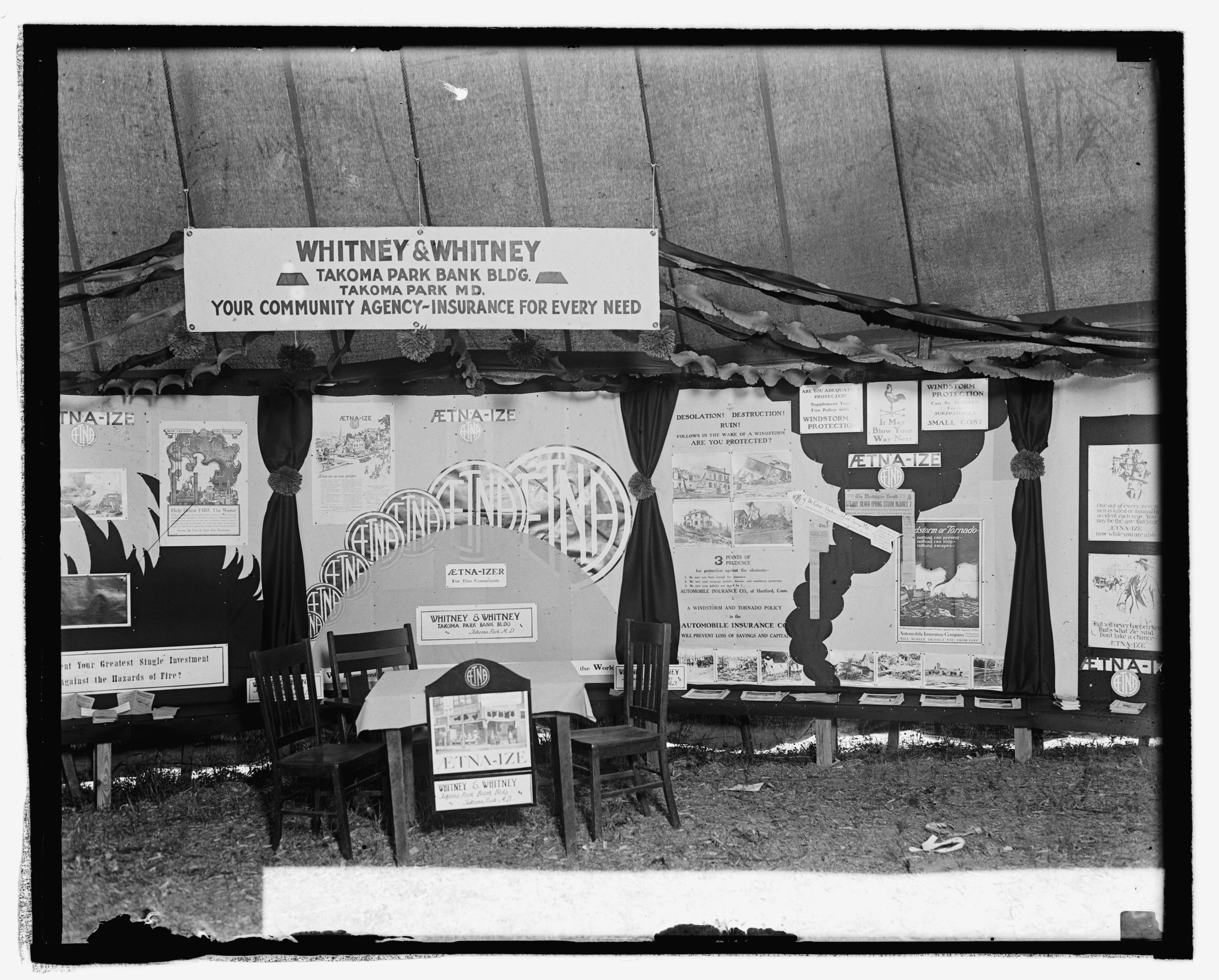
Aetna insurance was sold in Maryland in 1924.

- 1924: By 1924, Aetna had $94 million, 43% of its assets, invested in farm mortgages. That year, Aetna acquired The Standard Fire Insurance Co.
- 1960: Aetna expanded outside the U.S., buying a Canadian company, Excelsior Life Insurance Company.
- 1968: In 1968, Aetna bought a majority interest in Producer's and Citizen's Cooperative Assurance Company of Sydney, Australia. Also in 1968, Aetna's stock debuted on the NYSE.
- 1970: Aetna's Pension, Casualty and Life Division under the direction of B.E. Burton, President and Lead Actuary, saw billion-dollar growth in the post-ERISA pension administration segment.
- 1981: In 1981, Aetna bought a 40% interest in two Chilean companies, and soon thereafter invested in ventures in England, Spain, Hong Kong, Taiwan, Indonesia and Korea.
- 1996: Aetna sold its property and casualty subsidiary to The Travelers Companies. Also in 1996, Aetna acquired U.S. Healthcare, founded by Leonard Abramson. The company's name changed to Aetna Inc.
- 1998: In 1998, Aetna bought NYLCare Health Plans from the New York Life Insurance Company for $1.05 billion, adding 2.2 million members.
- 1999: Aetna bought Prudential HealthCare for $1 billion, making it the largest provider of health benefits in the U.S., with more than 21 million members.

=== 2000s ===
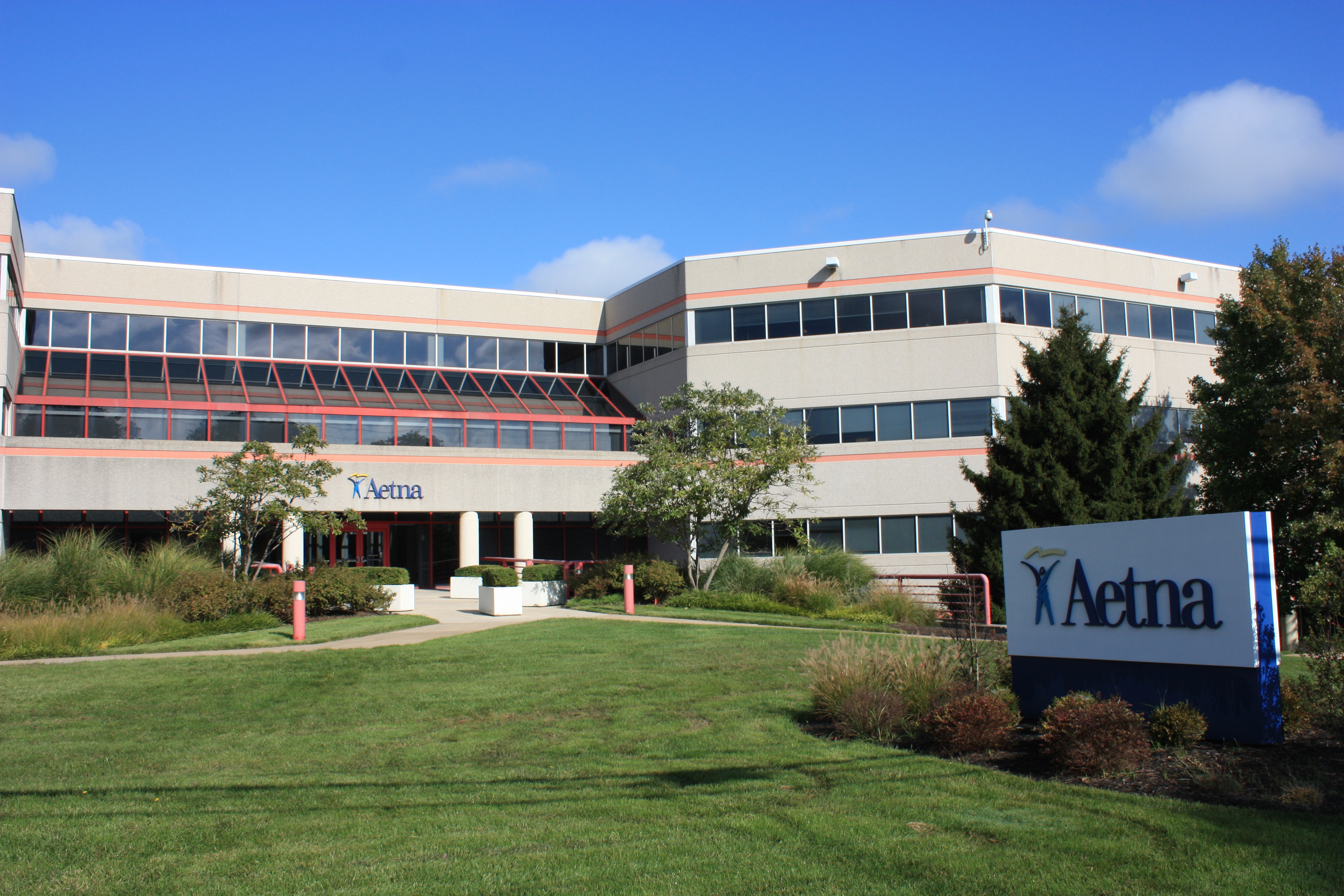
Aetna office in Whitpain Township in Pennsylvania (2012)

- 2000: Aetna hired John Rowe as CEO and president. Rowe cut over 10,000 jobs and raised insurance premiums between 11 and 13 percent per year. Under Rowe, the company spent more than $20 million to revamp its computer systems, enabling the company to identify and discontinue unprofitable accounts. Within a few years, Aetna shed 8 million covered lives due to premiums that customers could no longer afford. Also in 2000, Aetna sold its financial services and international businesses to ING Group for $7.7 billion, spun off its health business to its shareholders, thus focusing its business as an independent health and group benefits company. Aetna publicly apologizes for issuing coverage for the lives of slaves during the 1850s.
- 2001: Aetna recruited global public relations and marketing executive Roy Clason Jr. to lead the company's reputation management strategies during Aetna's multi-year corporate turnaround campaign.
- 2002: In 2002, Rowe shrunk Aetna's customer base from 19 million members to 13 million by abandoning unprofitable markets, including almost half of the counties nationwide in which it offered Medicare products.
- 2006: John Rowe stepped down as CEO and executive chairman of Aetna.
- 2007: Aetna acquired plan operator Schaller Anderson in July, signaling a push into the growing business of running plans for Medicaid and the State Children's Health Insurance Program.
- 2008: Aetna CEO Ron Williams received $38.12 million in executive compensation. Also in 2008, Aetna began offering pet health insurance through Pets Best Insurance Services.
- 2009: On September 22, more than 200 people gathered in front of Aetna's Hartford headquarters to call for a public health insurance option they said is essential to true national health care reform. On October 2, Connecticut Attorney General Richard Blumenthal and Healthcare Advocate Kevin P. Lembo asked Aetna and four other insurance companies for information the companies may have sent policyholders regarding the impact of proposed legislation on Medicare Advantage and prescription drug programs. According to Blumenthal, some insurance companies exaggerated or stretched the impact of health care reform. On November 3, US Senator Tom Harkin, chairman of the Committee on Health, Education, Labor and Pensions, launched an investigation into health insurance pricing, asking Aetna and three other major insurers to justify their pricing practices. Also in November, Aetna announced the layoff of 3.5% of its work force, 625 employees. On November 30, Aetna CEO Ron Williams told analysts that Aetna would increase prices in 2010 and force 600,000 to 650,000 Aetna customers to drop their coverage. Aetna filed a $4.9 billion correction to its 2008 health insurance regulatory filings on December 7, 2009. The new filings showed that Aetna spent less on small business health care than previously reported.

=== 2010s ===
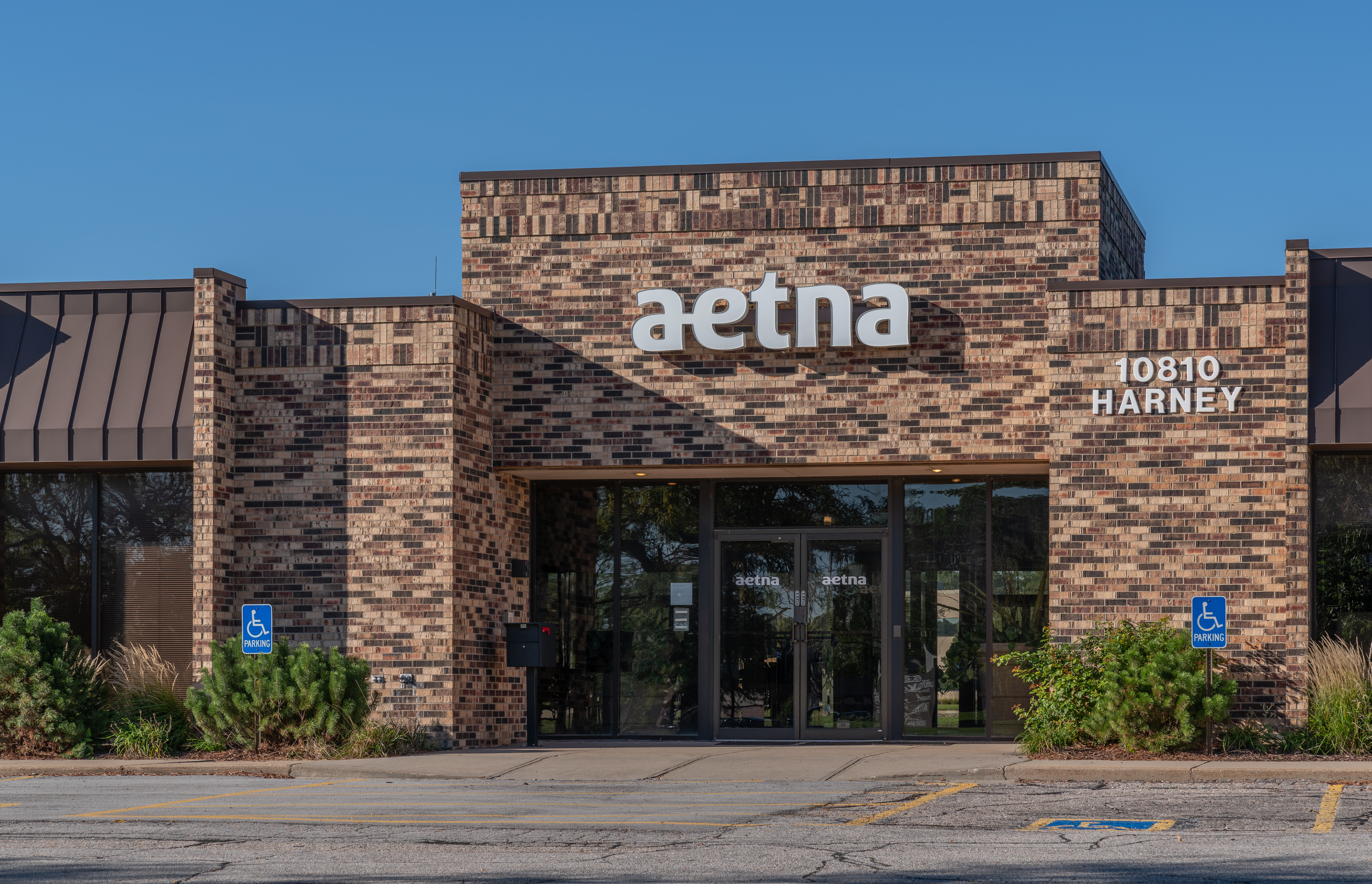
Aetna office building in Omaha, Nebraska

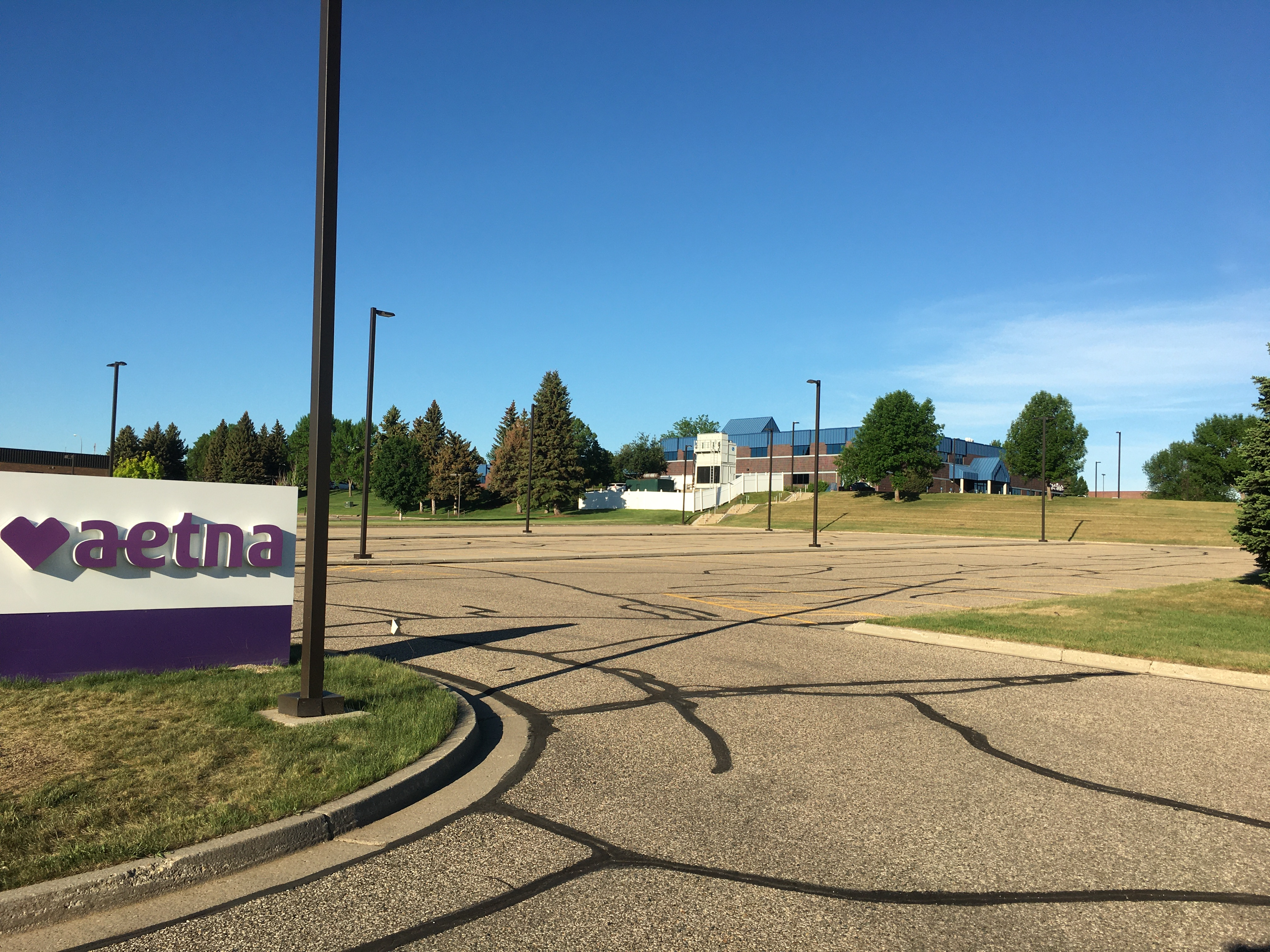
Aetna building and grounds in Bismarck, North Dakota

- 2010: Aetna and Continuum Health Partners had a contract dispute affecting coverage at various New York hospitals, and the contract lapsed. In July, a new contract was signed and coverage applied retroactively to the contract lapse.
- 2011: Aetna acquired Prodigy Health Group, parent of third-party administrator Meritain Health.
- 2012: Aetna introduced a new company logo, designed by New York-based Siegel+Gale.
- 2012: In June 2012, Aetna and Inova Health System announced a joint venture creating a new health insurance company, Innovation Health.
- 2013: Coventry Health Care was acquired by Aetna for $5.7 billion.
- 2015: On July 3, 2015, Aetna announced that it planned to acquire Humana for US$37 billion in cash and stock.
- 2014-2017: Aetna rebranded its Medicaid providers as Aetna Better Health.
- 2017: On January 23, 2017, John D. Bates, United States District Judge for the District of Columbia, blocked Aetna's merger with Humana, saying it would leave senior citizens with fewer options for Medicare coverage. On February 14, 2017, Aetna and Humana officially ended the $34 billion merger agreement, after judges ruled against the merger a second time.
- 2017: Aetna and Banner Health announced a joint venture creating a new health insurance company, Banner|Aetna.
- 2017: In June 2017, the company announced plans to move its headquarters to New York City in late 2018. After CVS announced the acquisition of Aetna in December 2017, CVS announced that the company's headquarters would remain in Hartford, scrapping plans to move to New York City.
- 2017: On December 3, 2017, CVS Health announced the acquisition of Aetna for $69 billion. Larry Merlo became chief executive of the two brands. Aetna CEO Mark Bertolini resigned and Aetna President Karen S. Lynch took over Aetna operations.
- 2018: On November 28, 2018, CVS Health completed the acquisition of Aetna. The company's ticker AET is delisted from the NYSE.

=== 2020s ===
- 2020: In November, Karen Lynch was named CEO of CVS.
- 2021: In February, Lynch announced that Aetna would begin offering individual plans through ACA exchanges in 2022.

== Lawsuits and regulatory action ==
=== 1999 ===
- A jury in California awarded $116 million in punitive damages for "malice, oppression and fraud" to a patient's widow who contended he died after a subsidiary of Aetna delayed approving treatment for stomach cancer that its own doctors had recommended. Lawyers on both sides called it the largest such verdict against a health maintenance organization. In 2001 a settlement was reached.

=== 2000 ===
- The U.S. Court of Appeals affirmed a $1.855 million federal jury award for Brokerage Concepts Inc. (BCI) against Aetna U. S. Healthcare (formerly U. S. Healthcare), its Pennsylvania subsidiary, and one of its former senior executives, Richard Wolfson. In its suit, BCI accused Aetna U. S. Healthcare of tortious interference with contractual relations. BCI alleged the managed-care company used its economic power in the business of prescription drug sales to coerce one of BCI's clients, the "I Got It at Gary's" pharmacy chain, into using another Aetna U. S. Healthcare subsidiary, Corporate Health Administrators, as its health benefits management firm. According to the suit, Aetna U. S. Healthcare threatened to drop "I Got it at Gary's" from its pharmacy network if the company didn't switch to Corporate Health Administrators.

=== 2001 ===
- The Maryland Insurance Commissioner ordered five Maryland health plans to pay a total of $1.4 million in penalties for failing to comply with the state's claims payment practices; Aetna was cited twice and ordered to pay the largest fine of $850,000.
- The State of Texas fined Aetna $1.15 million for failing to promptly pay doctors and hospitals for services. Texas Insurance Commissioner Jose Montemayor also ordered Aetna to pay restitution to physicians and health care providers who did not receive timely payment for claims.

=== 2002 ===
- The New York Department of Insurance fined Aetna US Healthcare and UnitedHealthcare a total of $2.5 million, citing mishandled claims, improper treatment denials, unlicensed health insurance agents, and poorly performing claims processors using out-of-date software.

=== 2003 ===
- To settle a class-action lawsuit between Aetna and 700,000 physicians and medical societies, Aetna agreed to streamline communications, reduce administrative complexity, and improve the quality of the health care system. The lawsuit was settled for $470 million and charged Aetna with systematically reducing payments to physicians and overriding their treatment decisions.
- Aetna and the American Dental Association (ADA) announced a class-action settlement by dentists who accused Aetna of interfering with dental procedures to cut costs and required dentists to comply with excessive paperwork. The settlement called for Aetna to pay $4 million to 40,000 to 50,000 dentists and $1 million to the ADA Foundation, a charitable group.
- Georgia Insurance Commissioner John W. Oxendine fined Aetna's Prudential Health Plan $100,000 for violating Georgia's prompt pay law by delaying claims payments. Aetna companies had been fined four previous times by Oxendine's office, in 2000 and again in 2002, for a total of $411,200.

=== 2007 ===
- The New Jersey Department of Banking and Insurance filed an administrative order levying a $9.5 million fine against Aetna for refusing to cover certain services provided by out-of-network providers—including emergency treatment—in violation of New Jersey rules and regulations.

=== 2009 ===
- Former Aetna employee Cornelius Allison of Darby, Pennsylvania, sued Aetna in U. S. District Court in Pennsylvania after hackers gained access to a company website holding personal data for 450,000 current and former employees, and job applicants. The suit charged Aetna with negligence, breach of contract, negligent misrepresentation and invasion of privacy.
- The Arizona Department of Insurance fined Aetna Life Insurance Company and Aetna Health, Inc. after examination of their practices exposed multiple violations of Arizona insurance laws. The department found that Aetna violated state laws governing areas of health insurance operations, including Aetna's: failure to provide policyholders with information about their rights on appeals of medical claims or services denials; failure to acknowledge receipt of policyholder appeals; failure to notify policyholders about appeal decisions/outcomes; and, in some appeals involving the denial of services for potentially life-threatening conditions, failure to inform policyholders of their decision within the required, expedited time frames.

=== 2010 ===
- Aetna paid a $750,000 fine as part of a settlement with the New York Insurance Department related to the company administering an affordable healthcare plan for the state. Aetna's violations included: failing to provide a required 30-day notice of rate increases to about 946 members in 2007, failing to provide notice to 1,406 terminated workers of their rights to convert to another policy, failing to report enrollment data from May 2007 through August 2008, and failing to respond to Insurance Department requests for data in March 2008.

=== 2018 ===
- On February 11, 2018, CNN reported that the California Department of Insurance launched an investigation into Aetna following sworn testimony from Dr. Jay Ken Iinuma, a former medical director for the insurer, in a lawsuit against the insurer in which he revealed he never reviewed any patients' medical records when deciding whether to approve or deny claims for coverage. The California Insurance Commissioner, Dave Jones, issued a statement confirming the investigation the following day. On February 27, 2018, the ranking members of the Senate Committee on Finance and Committee on Health, Education, Labor, and Pensions, Senators Ron Wyden and Patty Murray, issued a letter to Aetna demanding further information regarding Dr. Iinuma's testimony and the insurer's medical claims determination and patient appeal processes. In 2019, Aetna settled the lawsuit, but the California investigation continued.
- In 2018, a state jury in Oklahoma ruled against Aetna for $26.5 million in Ron Cunningham v. Aetna, with much of the damages arising from insurance bad faith.

=== 2021 ===
- On September 11, 2021, attorney Brian Adesman filed suit against Aetna in a federal class action lawsuit, alleging that "in administering the Aetna Plans, Aetna treats mental health as less important than physical health". Regarding the lawsuit, attorney Brian Adesman was reported in the media saying, "Insurance companies are not above the law and profits can't come before people."

== Life insurance policies on slaves ==
In 2000, Deadria Farmer-Paellmann, head of the nonprofit Restitution Study Group of Hoboken, New Jersey, disclosed that, from approximately 1853 to 1860, Aetna had issued life insurance policies to slaveowners covering the lives of their slaves.

The same year, Aetna acknowledged that concrete evidence exists for Aetna issuing coverage for the lives of slaves and released a public apology.

In 2002, Farmer-Paellmann brought suit against Aetna and two other companies in federal court asking for reparations for the descendants of slaves. The lawsuit said Aetna, CSX and Fleet were "unjustly enriched" by "a system that enslaved, tortured, starved and exploited human beings". It argued that African-Americans are still suffering the effects of two and a half centuries of enslavement followed by more than a century of institutionalized racism. The complaint blamed slavery for present-day disparities between blacks and whites in income, education, literacy, health, life expectancy and crime.

This suit was dismissed, and the dismissal largely upheld on appeal.

In 2006, Farmer-Paellmann announced a nationwide boycott of Aetna over the issue of reparations for its policies covering slaves. Aetna stated that its commitment to diversity in the workplace and its investment of over $36 million in such areas as education, health, economic development, community partnerships, and minority-owned business initiatives in the African-American community are more effective at aiding descendants of slaves and African-Americans in general than making restitutions for Aetna's life insurance policies on slaves.

== Lobbying and campaign contributions ==
Aetna spent more than $2.0 million in 2009 on lobbying. The company spent $809,793 between January 2009 and the end of March 2009—up 41 percent from the same period in 2008. Aetna's campaign contributions include more than $110,000 (~$160,206 in 2025) to US Senator Joe Lieberman (I-CT) in 2009, which has been cited by some as the reason for his opposition to the inclusion of a public health insurance option in the Affordable Care Act that would, hypothetically, force private insurers to reduce costs due to competition. From 2005 through 2009, Aetna contributed $56,250 to Senator Max Baucus (D-MT), chairman of the Senate Finance Committee, making Aetna the senator's seventh highest contributor over that time period.

== See also ==
- Eight Forty One (formerly Aetna Building)
- List of United States insurance companies

Related topics

- Drivotrainer
- Healthcare reform in the United States
- Healthcare reform debate in the United States
- Health insurance
- Life insurance
- Managed care
- Medicare Advantage
- Pet insurance
- Public health insurance option
