= African Americans in South Carolina =

Largest racial and ethnic minority in South Carolina, United States

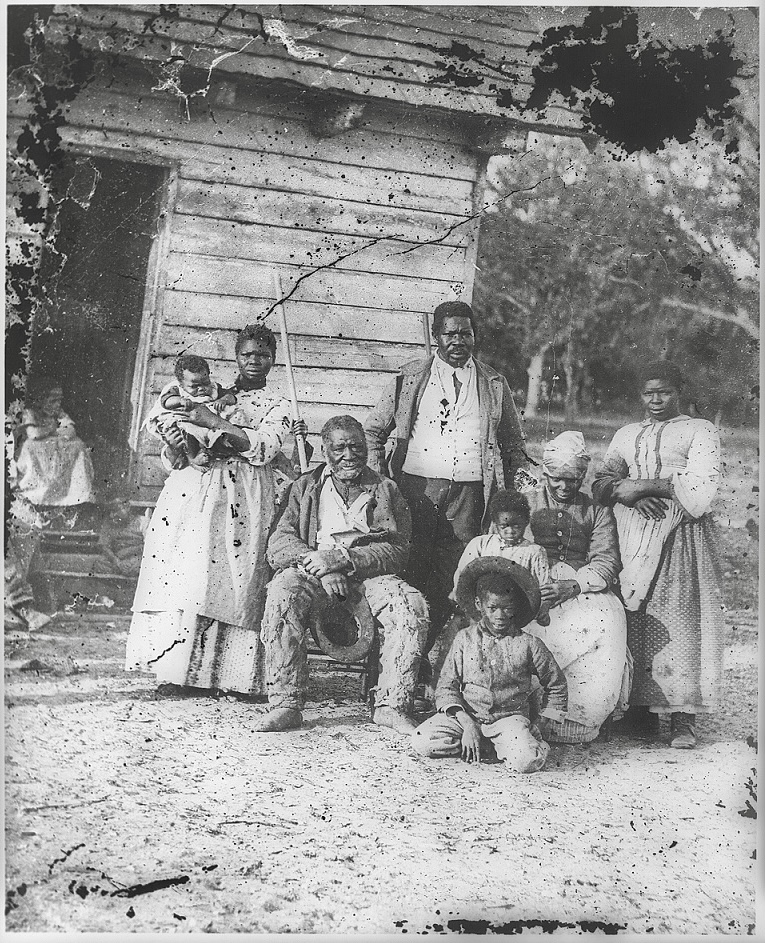
- Emancipated African Americans in South Carolina, photographed at the Port Royal Experiment by Timothy H. O'Sullivan, 1862

Total population
- 1,428,796 (2017)

Regions with significant populations
- Columbia, North Charleston and Charleston

Languages
- Southern American English, African-American Vernacular English, Gullah, African languages

Religion
- Black Protestant, Hoodoo, African traditional religions

Related ethnic groups
- Gullah

Black South Carolinians are residents of the state of South Carolina who are of African American ancestry. This article examines South Carolina's history with an emphasis on the lives, status, and contributions of African Americans. Enslaved Africans first arrived in the region in 1526, and the institution of slavery remained until the end of the Civil War in 1865. Until slavery's abolition, the free black population of South Carolina never exceeded 2%. Beginning during the Reconstruction Era, African Americans were elected to political offices in large numbers, leading to South Carolina's first majority-black government. Toward the end of the 1870s however, the Democratic Party regained power and passed laws aimed at disenfranchising African Americans, including the denial of the right to vote. Between the 1870s and 1960s, African Americans and whites lived segregated lives; people of color and whites were not allowed to attend the same schools or share public facilities. African Americans were treated as second-class citizens leading to the civil rights movement in the 1960s. In modern America, African Americans constitute 22% of the state's legislature, and in 2014, the state's first African American U.S. Senator since Reconstruction, Tim Scott, was elected. In 2015, the Confederate flag was removed from the South Carolina Statehouse after the Charleston church shooting.

== Colonial South Carolina ==
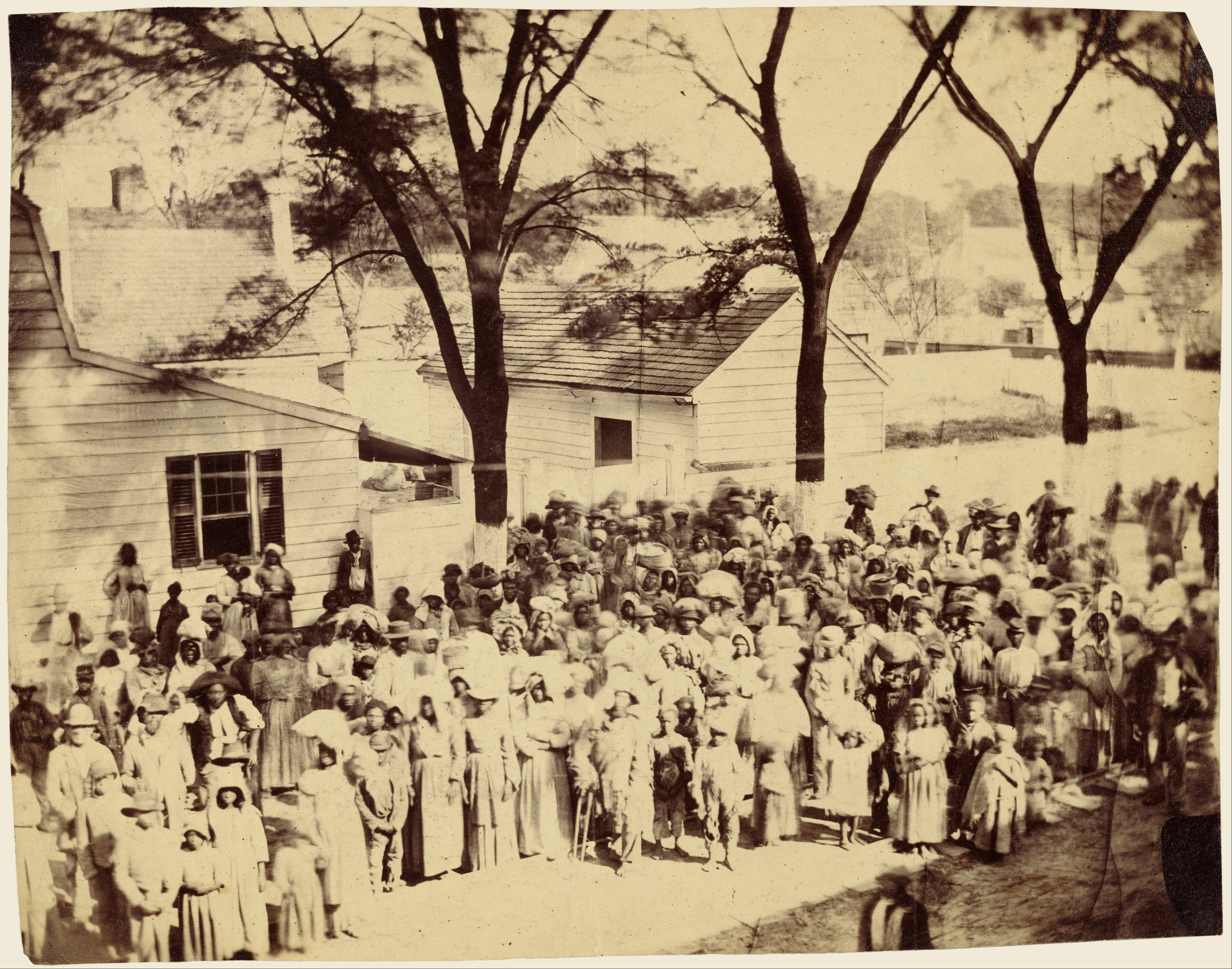
Enslaved blacks in South Carolina

When Spanish and French explorers reached the region in the 16th century, they encountered numerous tribes of Native Americans, with the Cherokees and the Catawba people being the most prominent prior to the arrival of African American slaves in South Carolina. The initial European efforts to establish settlements were unsuccessful; however, in 1670, a lasting English settlement was founded along the coast close Charleston. The English then began dependent on African American slavery.

Enslaved Africans first arrived in the area that would become South Carolina in 1526 as part of a Spanish expedition from the Caribbean. In 1670 when the British Empire colonized the region, the Lords Proprietor established the Province of Carolina and created a plantation-style economy that increasingly relied on enslaved labor. By 1708, the enslaved African population in South Carolina exceeded the number of free whites. This black majority existed in the state until the Great Migration in the early twentieth century, with some temporary fluctuations.

Black people were present at the founding of the English colony in South Carolina. Europeans brought black slaves to the state after the genocide of Native Americans.

=== Slave Trade ===
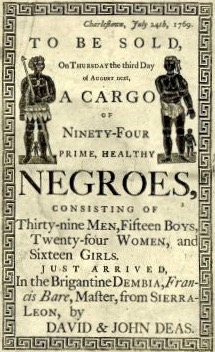
Enslaved people auction advertisement in Charles Town, South Carolina, 1769

Unlike her more northern colonies, South Carolina's introduction to slavery was based largely on a preexisting enslavement system from the Caribbean in the late seventeenth century. Many of the colony's first white settlers immigrated from Barbados. By 1700, South Carolina's system of slavery resulted in the development of the rice and indigo cash crop industry. Contrary to popular understanding, cotton was not a big factor until the early 1800s. By the eighteenth century, most of the slave trade in South Carolina was under the control of the Royal African Company, established by the British monarchy to facilitate trading in west Africa. Slave traders typically offered products such as iron and copper bars, brass pans and kettles, cowry shells, old guns, gunpowder, cloth, and alcohol in return for African slaves; ships typically loaded between 200 and over 600 slaves.

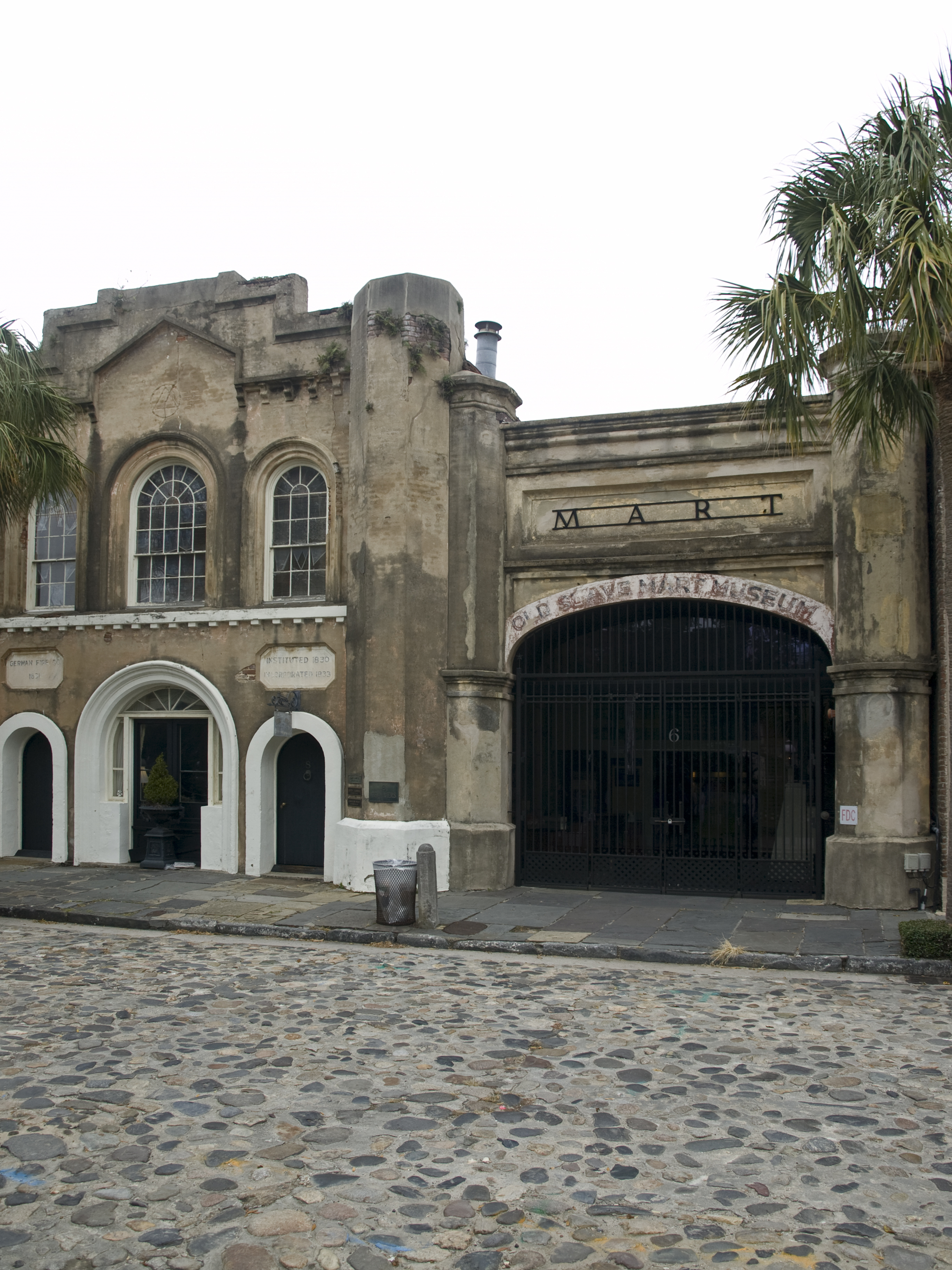
The Old Slave Mart in Charleston, SC, one of many locations where slaves were purchased and sold.

Charleston, South Carolina, named Charles Town in colonial times, was a major global port for trading goods and slaves. More than half of the slaves that came to British North America passed through Charles Town. By 1770, more than 3,000 African slaves were imported to the city annually. The International African American Museum, opening in 2022, is being built in Charleston, South Carolina, on the site where Gadsden's Wharf, the disembarkation point of up to 40% of all American slaves, once stood.

When slaves arrived in the city, they were often inspected and auctioned at the local market. Potential buyers inspected male slaves for characteristics of strength. If a male slave appeared weak, old, or frail, he sold for a lower price than a young, brawny male. Slaves with bruising and scaring from whippings were auctioned more cheaply because buyers were uneasy about purchasing a slave they believed to be rebellious. Women were inspected for characteristics of beauty and child reproduction. Both male and female slaves were inspected for diseases, typically being stripped of their clothing. Some potential buyers even forced open the mouths of slaves to view their teeth, another method of inspecting for disease. Slaves that were not purchased in Charles Town were forced to travel to other slave auction houses, such as in Georgetown or in other colonies.

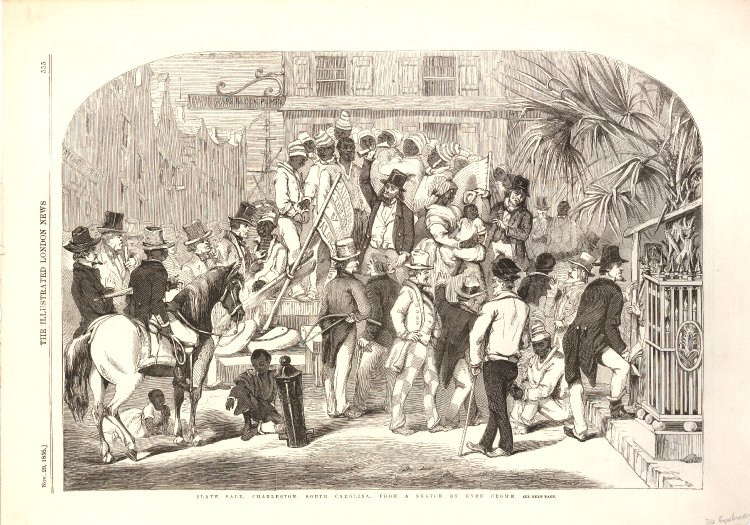
Depiction of a slave sale Charleston South Carolina

Slave auctions also served as a form of entertainment for many white residents in Charles Town. Even people that had no intentions of bidding on a slave watched as African men and women were sold by the auctioneer. In some instances, auctioneers provided wine, drink and other forms of refreshments for slave buyers. As the slave practice grew, the prices of slaves rose. By the 1770s, slaves sold as high as $1,500, or about the price of a new car in modern times, and families were often separated through the auction.

Most of South Carolina's slaves were imported from the Angola-Congo region, Senegambia and Sierra Leone.

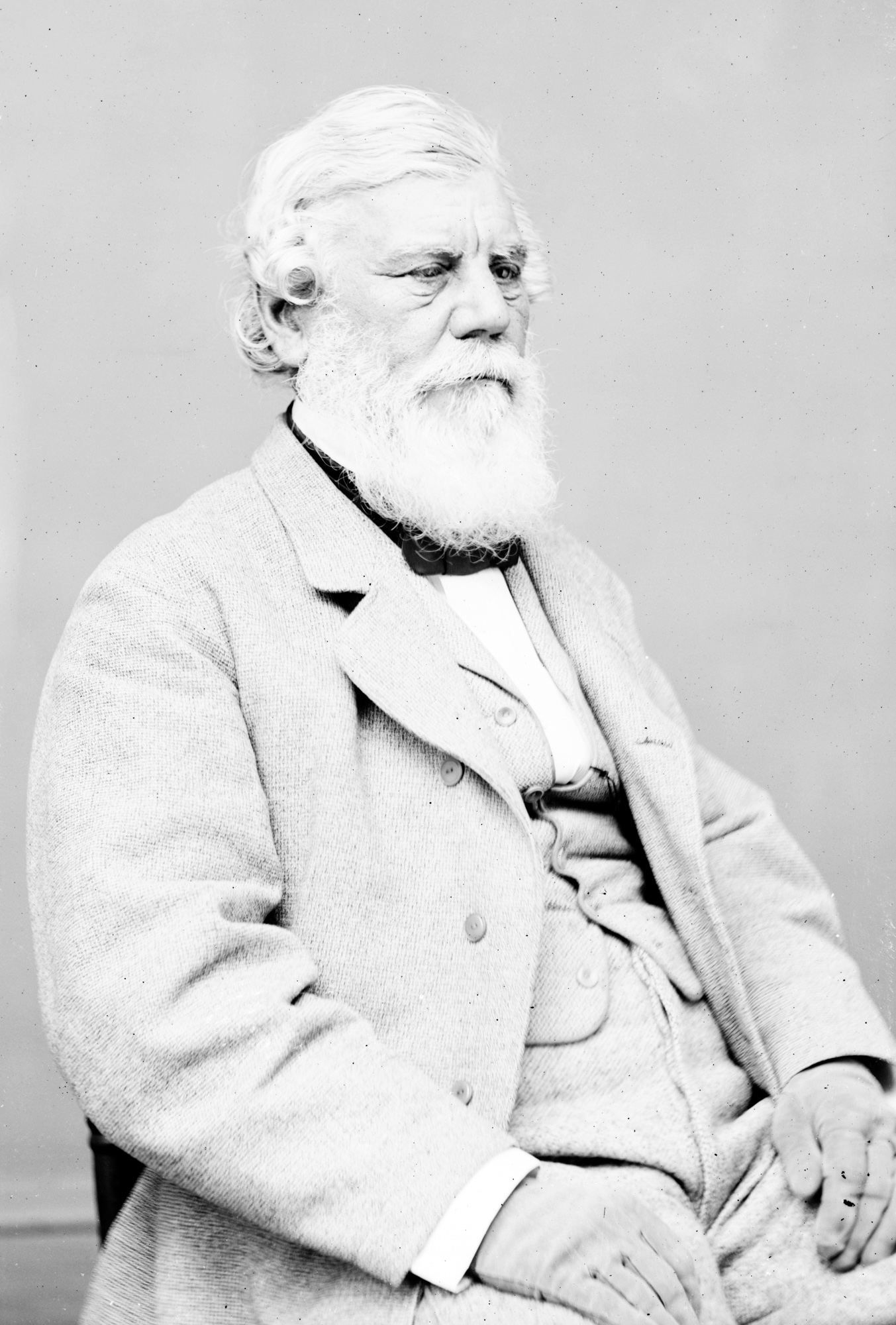
William Aiken Jr. was one of the largest slave owners in South Carolina.

=== Stono Rebellion ===
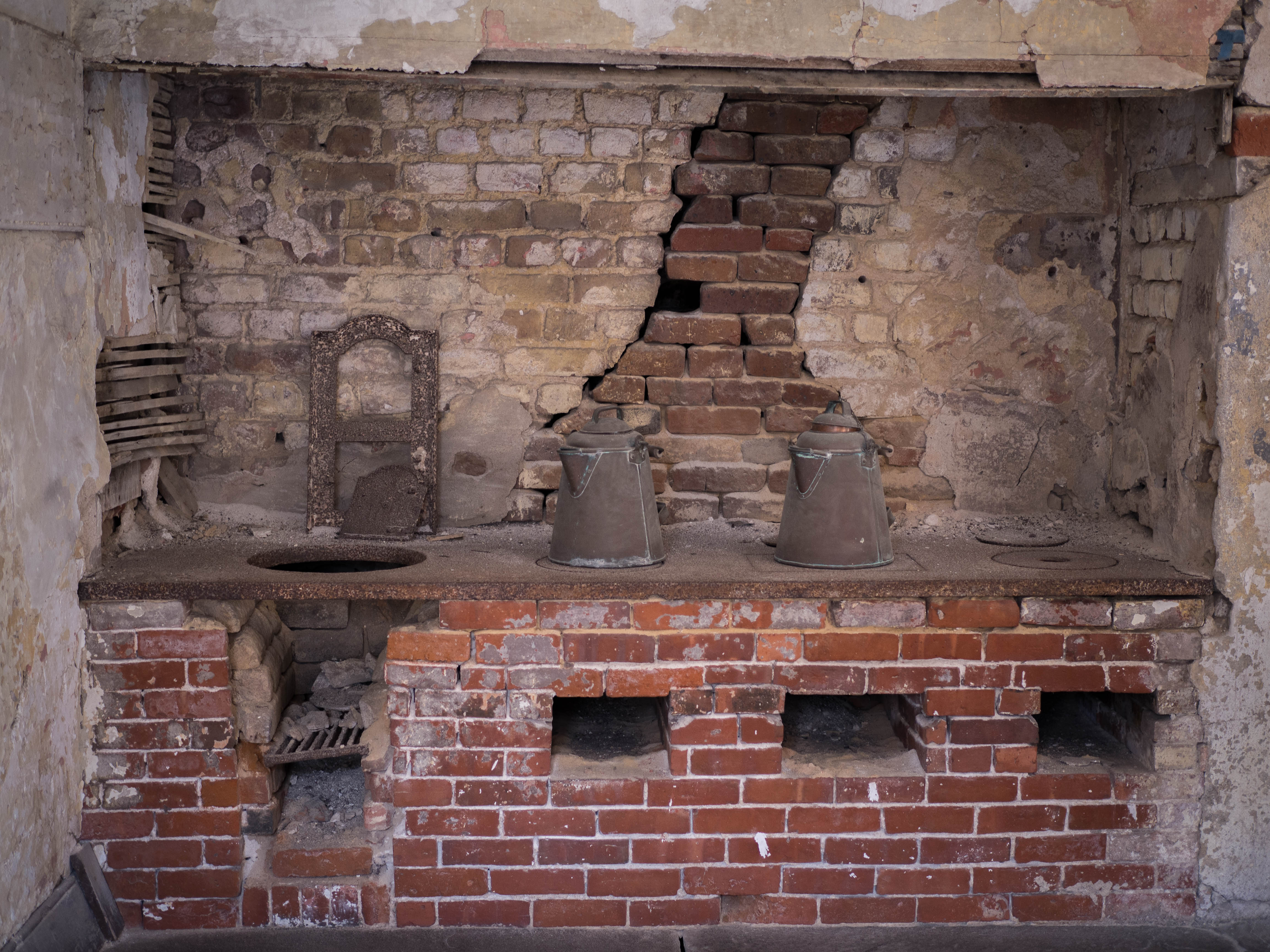
Aiken-Rhett House in Charleston, SC (urban slave quarters).

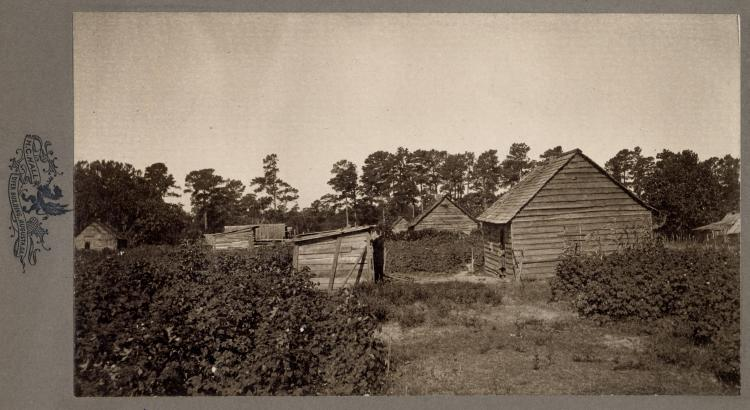
Plantation slave houses South Carolina Low Country

The Stono Rebellion was the largest slave uprising in the British mainland colonies, resulting in the deaths of 40-50 Africans and 23 colonists. (Note: Sources vary with respect to the number dead. Some sources say 21 white men, while others say 25. Some sources say 44 Negros and others say 48) The revolt was led by a slave named Jemmy in 1739, who gathered 22 slaves near the Stono River in Charleston. They marched chanting "Liberty," and recruited more slaves along the way. The group killed two storekeepers to gather weapons and ammunition. The slaves' goal was to march to Spanish Florida, a well-known refuge for escapees. Lieutenant Governor William Bull warned slave owners that a rebellion was forming; the slave owners gathered militia to suppress the uprising. The following day, the slaves and militia met, and after the confrontation, 23 whites and 47 slaves were killed. (Note: Sources vary with respect to the number dead. Some sources say 21 white men, while others say 25. Some sources say 44 Negros and others say 48) While the slave rebellion was defeated, it encouraged many governments in British America to pass laws further restricting the freedoms of slaves and of free blacks.

In response to the Stono Rebellion, the South Carolina legislature passed more laws limiting the rights of African Americans and more-strictly regulating the institution of slavery. One such law was the Negro Act of 1740, which restricted slave assembly, education, and movement in addition to requiring legislative approval for each act of manumission. The act established penalties for slave owners who were too lenient in punishing their slaves. The act required slaves to travel with a pass and gave any white male the ability to scrutinize, question, and detain blacks they believed to be escaped slaves.

== The Revolutionary War ==
Politicians were divided on how African Americans who fought for the American cause should be rewarded. Two delegates to the Continental Congress, Edward Rutledge and Thomas Lynch, sought to bar free African Americans from enlisting in the militia, while other statesmen, such as Henry Laurens, favored exchanging military service for freedom. Under Lauren's proposal, the Continental Congress would provide slave owners $1,000 for each able-bodied slave under 35 years-old provided for military service, though this proposal was rejected. Another proposal from Thomas Sumter stated that any man who joined the militia for ten months would be gifted one free slave, though this proposal was also rejected. Ultimately, slaves who served as Patriots were returned into slavery following the war's conclusion. African Americans who served in the Continental Army were mostly laborers or cooks, and very few fought in combat situations. Slaves did not typically serve non-voluntarily; most were commanded by their slave owners to serve in their stead, and any slave who refused to serve after being instructed, risked a penalty of death. If the slave was paid the typical daily wage of seven pence, by law, that money belonged to the slave owner.

Some South Carolina African Americans fought for the British as Loyalists. Dunmore's Proclamation declared that any slave who ran away from his master and joined the royal forces would be granted his freedom. This promise was never carried out since the British lost the war. As many as 25,000 slaves, along with other British Loyalists, escaped South Carolina following the conclusion of the war. One band of three hundred Georgia and South Carolina slaves, who called themselves King of England's Soldiers, fled to the Savannah River swamps and survived until May 1786 when they were burned out by militia.

== Early and Antebellum America ==
The Act Prohibiting Importation of Slaves was signed by President Thomas Jefferson in 1807. Anticipating the enforcement of this law, Charleston traders acquired approximately 70,000 Africans between 1804 and 1807. For most of the nineteenth century, slaves in South Carolina were born into slavery, not carried from Africa. By 1860, the slave population of South Carolina was just over 402,000, and the free black population was just over 10,000. At the same time, there were approximately 291,000 whites in the state, accounting for about 30% of the population. Compared to other states, South Carolina had a very large population of slaves, which had nearly quadrupled in the 70 years between 1790 and 1860. Much of this growth can be attributed to the rise of the cotton industry. Prior to the 1800s, South Carolina's slave-based economy dealt mostly in the harvesting of tobacco, rice, and indigo. In 1800, the Santee Canal connected the Santee and Cooper rivers, making it possible to transport goods directly from Columbia, South Carolina to Charleston by water. The creation of the Santee Canal, coupled with the invention of the cotton gin, transformed the cotton-production business into part of the global economy. The upcountry of South Carolina had fertile land that supported the growing of short-staple cotton, and many planters ruined the fertility of the land, often unknowingly, by planting season after season of cotton. But the slave-driven cotton industry catapulted South Carolina as one of the wealthiest locations on Earth by the mid-nineteenth century. Slavery soon spread throughout all of South Carolina instead of having a concentration along the coast as it had since the 1600s. The expansion of slavery throughout the state led to the full maturity of the slave society in South Carolina, and by 1860, 45.8 percent of white families in the state owned slaves, giving the state one of the highest percentages of slaveholders in the country.

=== Denmark Vesey ===
Denmark Vesey was born into slavery in St. Thomas, a colony of Denmark. Vesey's owner settled in Charleston after the Revolutionary War. Vesey won $1,500 prize in a city lottery; he used $600 to purchase his freedom. After gaining his freedom, Vesey socialized with many slaves and became increasingly set on helping them escape slavery. In 1821, Vesey and a few slaves began to conspire to plan a revolt. In order for the revolt to be successful, Vesey had to recruit others and strengthen his army, which was not complicated because he was a lay preacher. Vesey inspired slaves by connecting their potential freedom to the biblical story of the Exodus. He planned the insurrection to take place on Bastille Day, July 14, 1822. Vesey held numerous secret meetings and eventually gained the support of both slaves and free blacks throughout the city and countryside who were willing to fight for their freedom. Vesey planned to make a coordinated attack on the Charleston arsenal. After seizing weapons, Vesey intended to commandeer ships from the harbor and sail to Haiti, which had recently led a successful slave revolution. Vesey and his followers also planned to kill white slaveholders throughout the city, as had been done in Haiti, and liberate more slaves.

Two slaves loyal to their masters, George Wilson and Joe LaRoche, opposed Vesey's planned revolution; they reported the scheme to officials. Wilson and LaRoche's testimonies confirmed an earlier report from another slave named Peter Prioleau. Based on the slaves' warning, the city launched a search for conspirators. The Mayor James Hamilton organized a citizens' militia, putting the city on alert. White militias and groups of armed men patrolled the streets daily for several weeks until many slaves were arrested, including Vesey. Over the course of five weeks, the city court ordered the arrest of 131 black men, charging them with conspiracy. In total, the courts convicted 67 men of conspiracy and hanged 35, including Vesey, in July 1822. A total of 31 men were deported, 27 reviewed and acquitted, and 38 questioned and released. While a failed revolution, Vesey's conspiracy resulted in stricter slave laws and regulations against blacks to be enacted throughout the country. Policing and control of the freedmen and slave populations was stepped up even further in the aftermath of the Charleston Workhouse Slave Rebellion of 1849.

=== Life as a slave ===
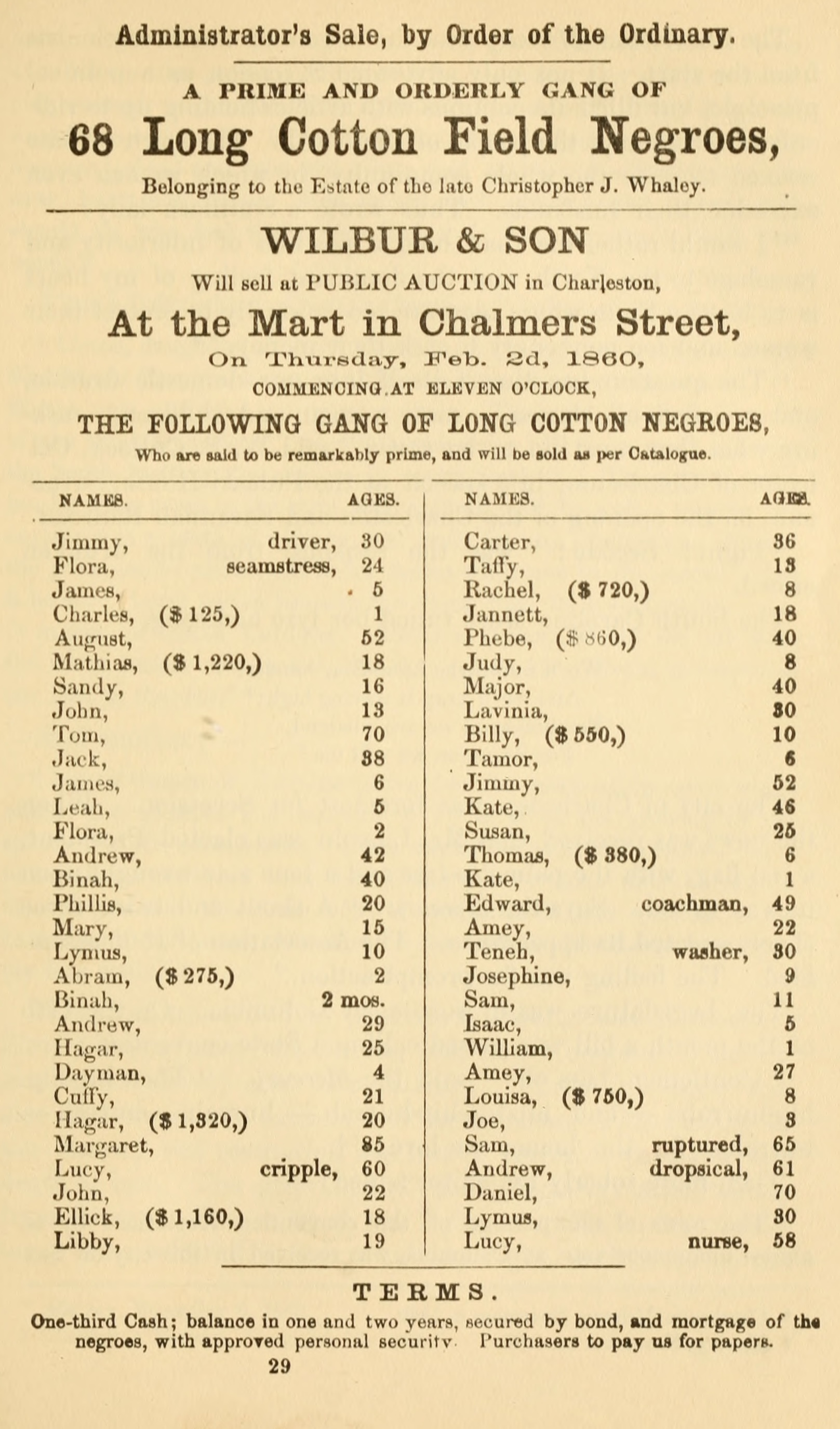
Advertising handbill for an 1860 slave auction at what is now the Old Slave Mart Museum in Charleston; taken by Charles Carleton Coffin from the mart in 1865

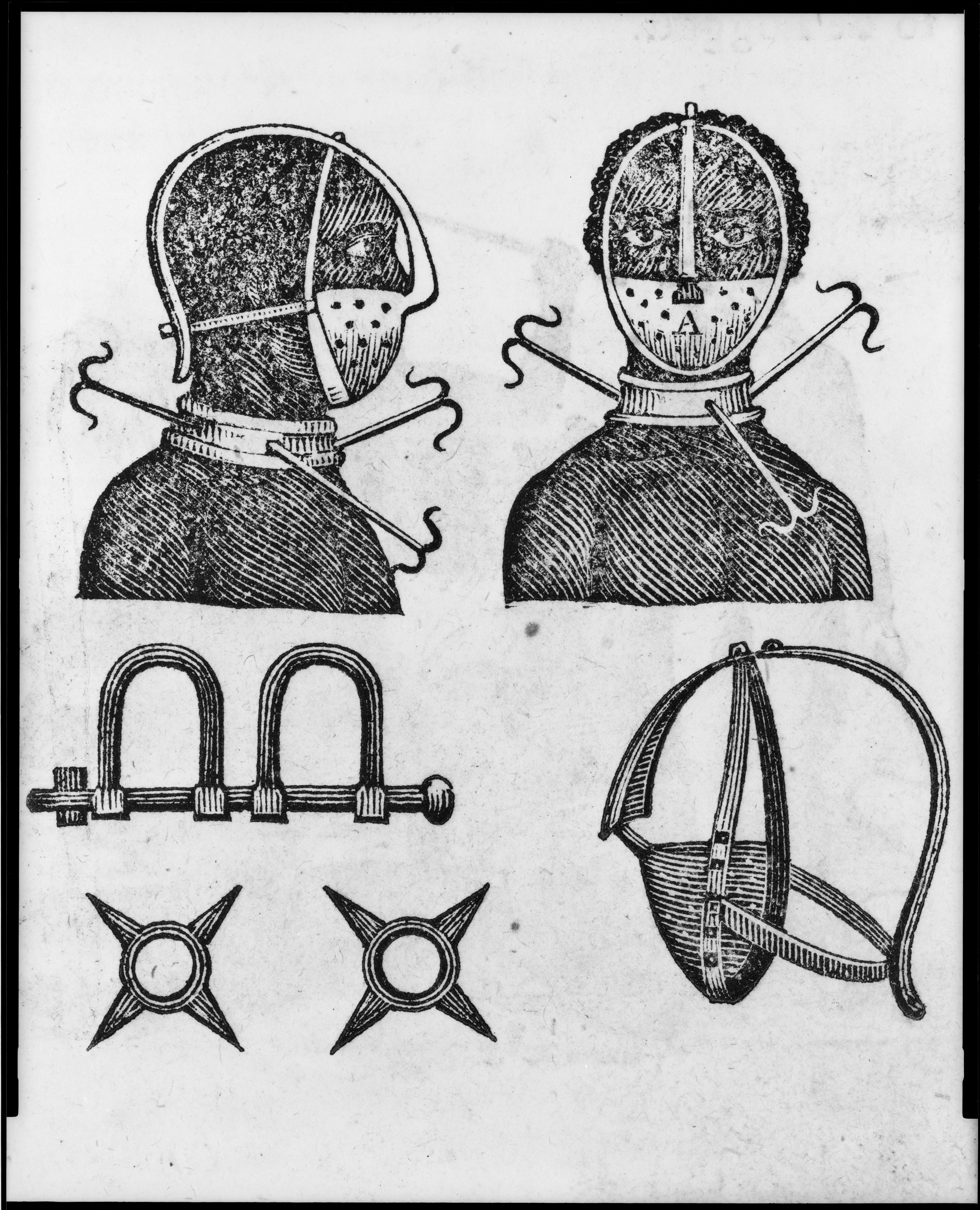
Iron mask, collar, leg shackles and spurs used to restrict slaves, especially as a punishment.

In Antebellum South Carolina, slave-owning society was divided into three tiers: the Yeomen class, which on average owned 1-5 slaves; the Middling class, which on average owned 5-20 slaves; and the Planter class, which on average owned over 20 slaves. While some slaves worked on huge planter-class plantations, some slaves worked on small farms. The planter class only accounted for 12% of slave owners.

Life as a slave varied drastically from owner to owner. Typically, there were three types of slave labor structures in South Carolina: (1) the gang system, which was the most common and required slaves to work from sun up to sundown. This system was most commonly used on cotton plantations and was the most brutal; (2) the task system, which required slaves to complete a certain task by the end of the workday. This system, while less common, provided slaves time to exercise their culture if their tasks were completed early; (3) household slaves, who were typically females that worked inside the slaveowner's home chiefly to nursery children, prepare food and cook.

==== Slave Codes, restrictions, and punishment ====
Slaves were often prohibited from gathering, practicing religion, learning to read or write, and owning weapons, though much of these restrictions were decided by the slave owner. Some examples of slave codes are listed below:

1712 South Carolina slave code, with amendments in 1739, enforced until the Civil War

- "Slaves were forbidden to leave the owner's property unless they were accompanied by a white person or had permission. If a slave leaves the owner's property without permission, 'every white person' is required to chastise such slaves."
- "Slave homes are to be searched every two weeks for weapons or stolen goods. Punishment for violations escalates to include loss of ear, branding, and nose-slitting, and, for the fourth offense, death."
- "No slave is allowed to work for pay; plant corn, peas or rice; keep hogs, cattle, or horses; own or operate a boat; buy or sell; or to wear clothes finer than 'Negro cloth.'"
- "A fine of $100 and six months in prison are imposed for teaching a slave to read and write, and death is the penalty for circulating incendiary literature."

==== Abuse and punishment ====
Whites that hit, harmed, or otherwise punished slaves were generally protected in South Carolina. Rules and regulations passed under the Negro Act of 1740 carried both into South Carolina law and custom. For example, if a white man were to kill a slave, he would be subject to a misdemeanor and fined. In reverse, if a black man were to kill a white man, he would be executed. Slaves that attempted to run away from their masters were subject to various types of punishments ranging from whipping, the most common, to death. Some slaves were branded with a hot iron or had part of their bodies marked. Some slave owners took a knife to a slave's ear or nose and disfigured it in a way that distinguished the slaves as runaways. Some slaves were tortured by having salt, vinegar, or pepper seeds fleshed into their wounds. Some rebellious slaves were sold away from their families. Female slaves, especially aged 14–25, were exposed to the risk of being raped by a white man. Owners of female slaves could freely and legally use them as sexual objects. Furthermore, females of breeding age were often kept pregnant, as slavery status was inherited through the mother and following the bans on importing new slaves from Africa, it was the most abundant source of new slaves. Any black man found having sexual relations with a white woman would have been put to death.

=== Slave Culture ===
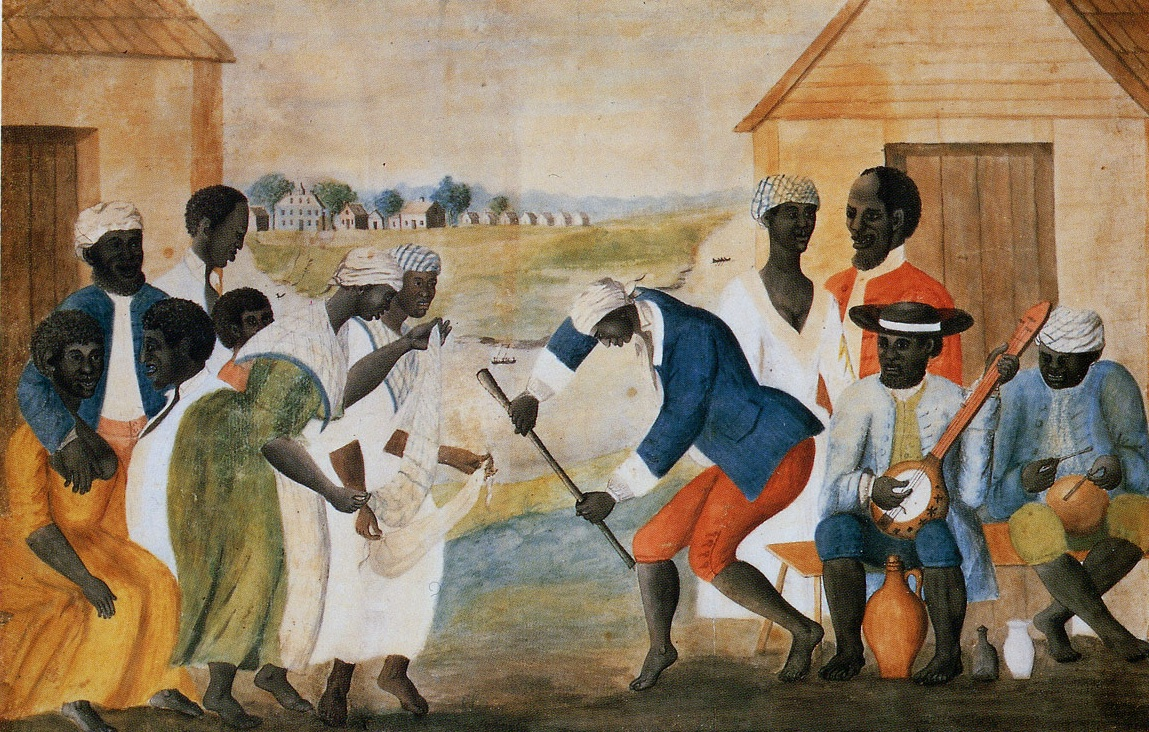
Slave Dance and Music

Slaves in South Carolina exercised culture through cuisine, music, dance, hair, language, and religion. Many slaves sang songs about escaping, such as Follow the Drinking Gourde and Wade in the Water.

==== Gullah ====
African Americans in the coastal regions of South Carolina, commonly referred to as the "Gullah," are known for preserving more of their African heritage than any other community in the United States. They speak an English-based creole language containing many African loanwords and significant influences from African languages in grammar and sentence structure; Gullah storytelling, cuisine, music, folk beliefs, crafts, farming and fishing traditions, all exhibit strong influences from West and Central African cultures. http://www.beaufortsc.org/guides/gullah-history/

==== David Drake ====
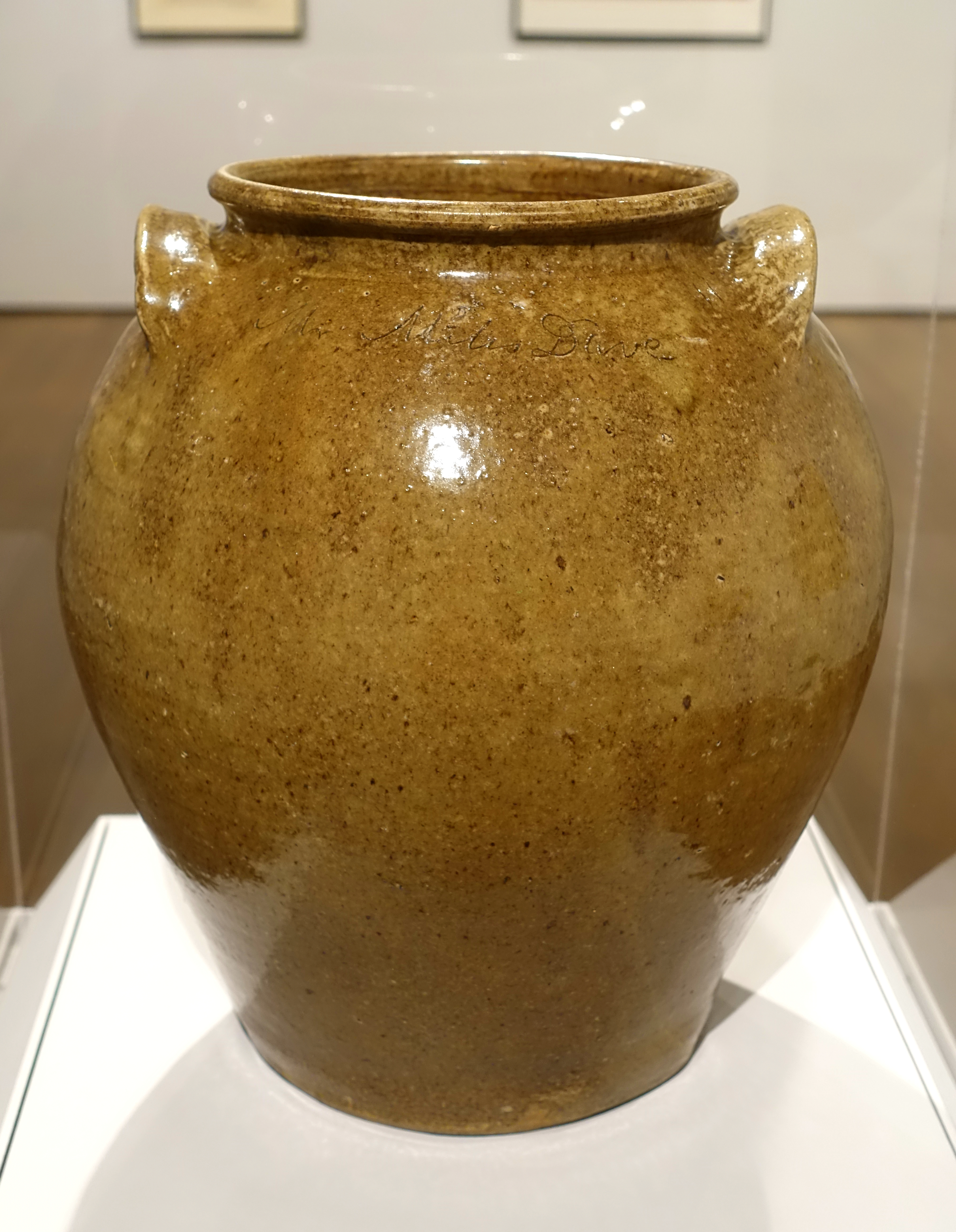
A storage jar by David Drake, 1840, at the Fogg Museum at Harvard University.

David Drake, an enslaved man from Edgefield, South Carolina, became famous for his pottery creations. Historians estimate that Drake produced over 40,000 pieces throughout his lifetime. While Drake was living, his pottery was worth about fifty cents apiece, though some pieces in the twenty-first century have sold for as high as $50,000. Drake often inscribed poetry or messages onto his pottery. Many of these inscriptions verged on sedition and rebellion since it was generally prohibited for slaves to read or write. In one inscription, Drake wrote "I wonder where is all my relations / Friendship to all—and every nation." Drake was likely attempting to subtly criticize the institution of slavery. For a seventeen-year period, Drake did not sign any pots, likely because his owner prohibited it.

=== Free persons of color ===
The free black population of South Carolina never exceeded 2% of the overall population. The developing economies of Northern and upper-South states facilitated abolition while the heavy investment in King Cotton in South Carolina only strengthened the institution of slavery. By 1860, the free black population of South Carolina remained at 2% while Maryland's was nearly 49%. It was uncommon for slaves to be freed in the state since manumission was generally illegal. In 1850, for instance, only two slaves gained their freedom. Of the small percentage of free blacks in South Carolina, 79% of those were mulattos or people of mixed race. Some slaveowners had children by their slaves, and such offspring were more likely to be manumitted, or freed, than those fully of African descent.

Most free blacks lived in the countryside as small farmers, but a small percentage worked as artisans, tenant farmers, or acquired their own land. Other free blacks held slaves for their labor. Daria Thomas, a planter in Union District in the 1860s, used many of his 21 slaves on his cotton farm. Likewise, William Ellison used 63 slaves on his plantation and in his cotton gin manufacturing business in Sumter. Most freed blacks, however, struggled because of legal disabilities. Since 98% of the state's population was enslaved, free blacks consistently had to prove that they were free. In the early 1800s, freed blacks were still tried in slave courts, and often faced an all-white jury. Free blacks could not testify in court against whites, and they were often prohibited from entering many businesses or establishments. Free blacks over the age of fifteen were required to be escorted by a white guardian. These restriction laws became stronger as slave rebellions across the nation drove fearful whites to attempt to stop further insurrection movements.

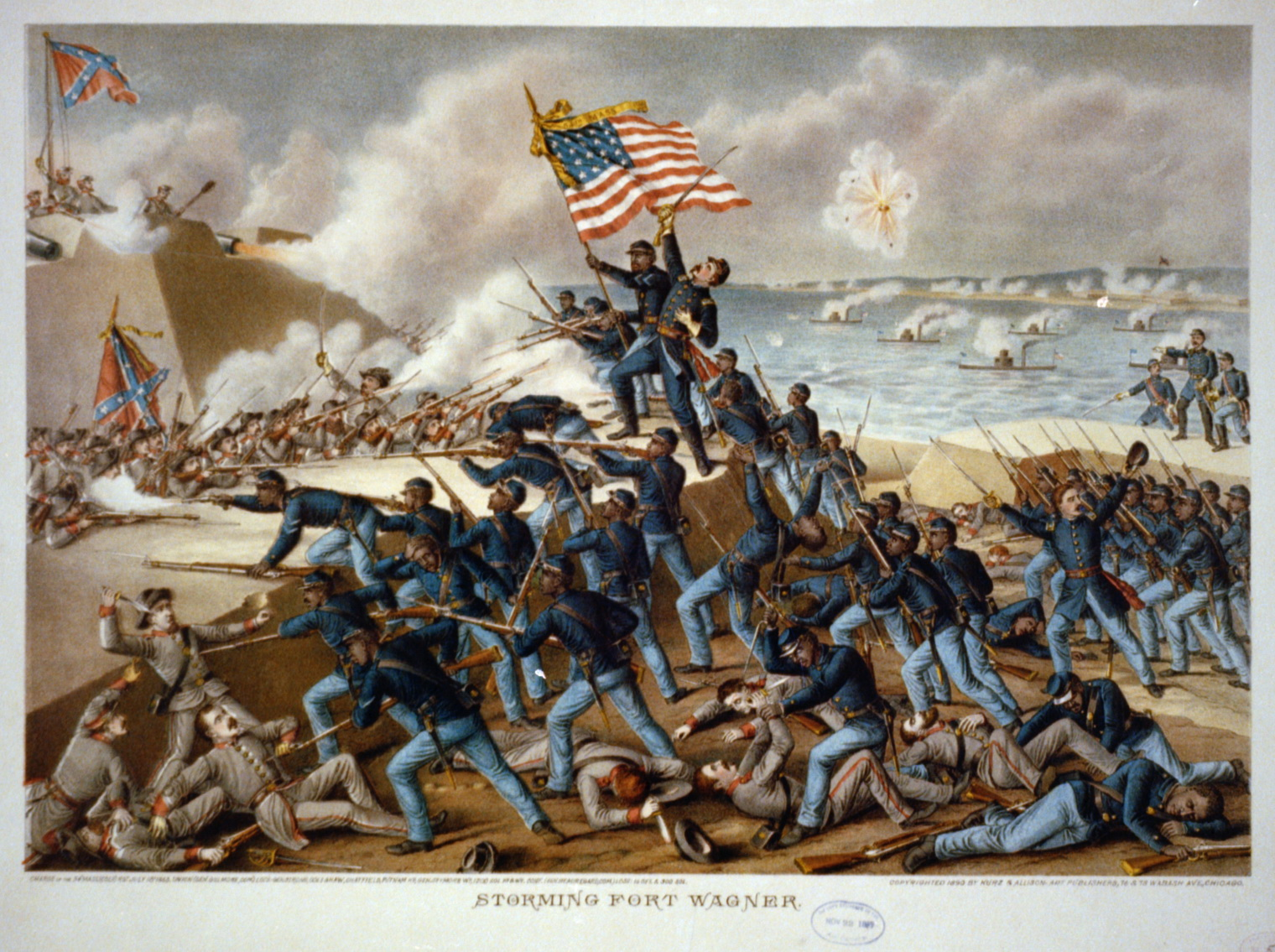
Print depicting the storming of Fort Wagner

== The Civil War ==
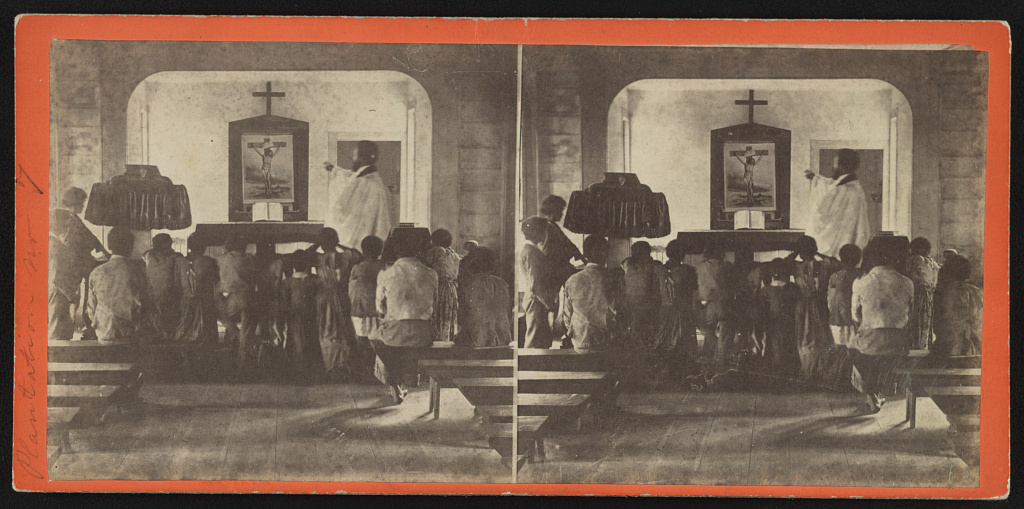
"Rockville Plantation Negro Church, Charleston, S.C." photographed in 1860 just before the beginning of the Civil War

According to Walter Edgar, a South Carolina historian, no evidence suggests that African Americans fought for the South during the Civil War. Confederates often feared arming blacks. Some slaves assisted with the Confederate army, but black men were not legally allowed to serve as combat soldiers in the Confederate Army—they were cooks, teamsters, and manual laborers. Also, they were usually compelled by force to serve. Many slaves across the South took advantage of the war to escape to freedom. These escapees were sometimes referred to by the Union as "contrabands" as in confiscated enemy property.

=== Second Battle of Fort Wagner ===
Composed of free African Americans from New England, some of whom were former slaves and fugitive slaves, the 54th Massachusetts Infantry Regiment fought at the Second Battle of Fort Wagner in Charleston, South Carolina. Fort Wagner was among the most heavily fortified Confederate forts, and on July 18, 1863, the 54th Massachusetts charged the fort. The battle lasted nearly three hours, and over 1,500 Union soldiers were captured, killed, or wounded. Although a tactical defeat, the publicity of the battle of Fort Wagner led to further action for black U.S. troops in the Civil War, and it spurred additional recruitment that gave the Union Army a further numerical advantage in troops over the South.

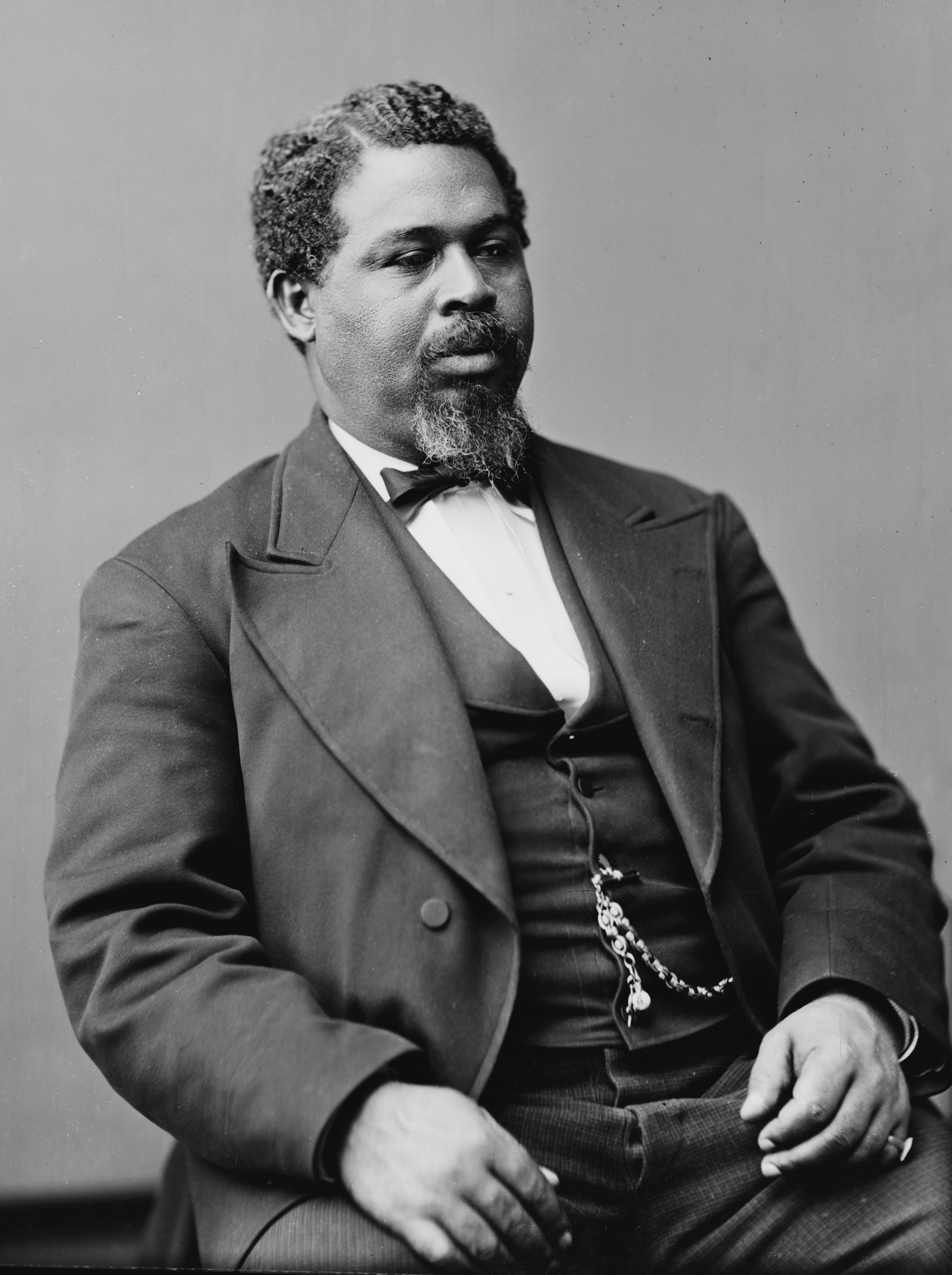
Robert Smalls as U.S. Congressman

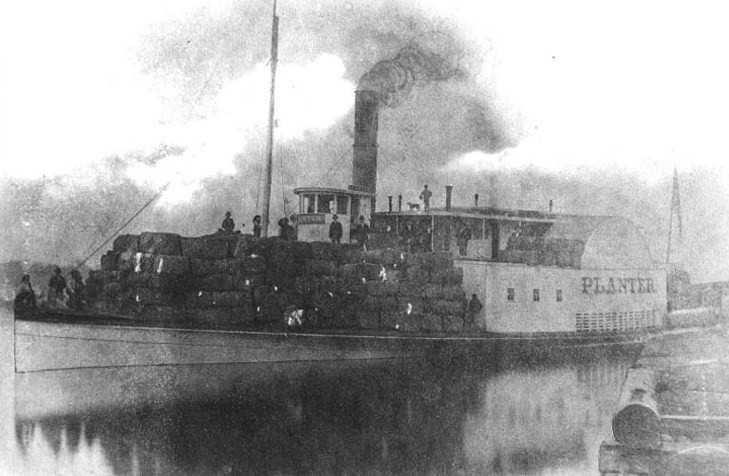
The Planter, commandeered by Robert Smalls.

=== Robert Smalls ===
Robert Smalls was born into slavery in 1839 in Beaufort County. When he was 12, Smalls' master sent him to Charleston to hire out as a laborer for a $1 weekly wage, with the rest of the wage being paid to his master. Smalls worked first at a hotel, then as a lamplighter; he later worked at the docks where he became a longshoreman, a rigger, a sailmaker, and eventually a wheelman. As a result, he was very knowledgeable about Charleston harbor.

In the fall of 1861, Smalls was assigned to steer the CSS Planter, a lightly armed Confederate military transport. The Planter's duties were to deliver dispatches, troops and supplies, to survey waterways, and to lay mines. On the evening of May 12, the Planter was docked as usual at the wharf below General Ripley's headquarters. Its three white officers disembarked to spend the night ashore, leaving Smalls and the crew on board, "as was their custom." (Afterward, the three Confederate officers were court-martialed and two convicted, but the verdicts were later overturned.) At about 3 a.m. May 13, Smalls and seven of the eight slave crewmen made their previously planned escape to the Union blockade ships. Smalls put on the captain's uniform and wore a straw hat similar to the captain's. He sailed the Planter past what was then called Southern Wharf and stopped at another wharf to pick up his wife and children and the families of other crewmen. Smalls guided the ship past the five Confederate harbor forts without incident, as he gave the correct signals at checkpoints. The Planter had been commanded by a Captain Charles C. J. Relyea and Smalls copied Relyea's manners and straw hat on deck to fool Confederate onlookers from shore and the forts. The Planter sailed past Fort Sumter at about 4:30 a.m. The alarm was only raised after the ship was beyond gun range. Smalls headed straight for the Union Navy fleet, replacing the rebel flags with a white bed sheet which was brought by his wife. The Planter had been seen by the USS Onward, which was about to fire until a crewman spotted the white flag.

Smalls, having just turned 23, quickly became known in the North as a hero for his daring exploit. Newspapers and magazines reported his actions. The U.S. Congress passed a bill awarding Smalls and his crewmen the prize money for the Planter (valuable not only for its guns but low draft in Charleston bay); Southern newspapers demanded harsh discipline for the Confederate officers whose joint shore leave had allowed the slaves to steal the boat. Smalls's share of the prize money came to US$1,500 (equivalent to $48,375 in 2025). Smalls was made pilot of the Crusader under Captain Alexander Rhind. In June of that year, Smalls was piloting the Crusader on Edisto in Wadmalaw Sound when the Planter returned to service, and an infantry regiment engaged in the Battle of Simmon's Bluff at the head of the Edisto River. He continued to pilot the Crusader and the Planter. As a slave, he had assisted in laying mines (then called "torpedoes") along the coast and river. Now, as a pilot, he helped find and remove them and serviced the blockade between Charleston and Beaufort.

After the Civil War, Smalls became the founder of the Republican Party of South Carolina. As a Republican, he was elected as a U.S. Representative to Congress five times, and he served in the South Carolina Senate.

== Reconstruction era ==
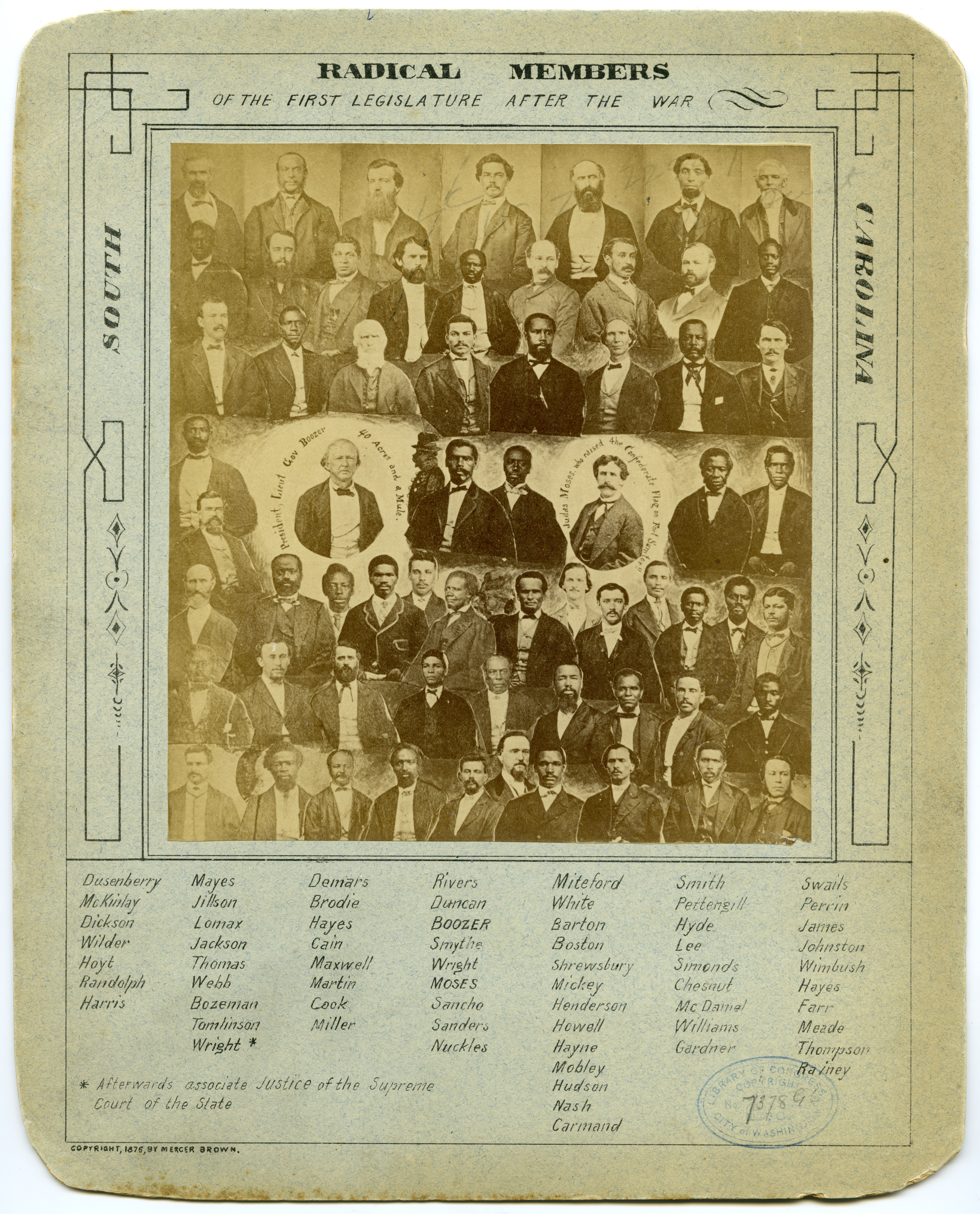
South Carolina's majority-black legislature during Reconstruction, often referred to as "Radical Republicans."

=== Emergence of an African American majority government ===
Laws passed during the Reconstruction era, including the Thirteenth, Fourteenth, and Fifteenth amendments to the United States Constitution greatly expanded the rights of African Americans in South Carolina. In 1867, U.S. troops registered voters in South Carolina, including for the first time, African Americans. Many former Confederates and Southern Democrats boycotted the voting process, leading to a high Republican turnout in the election the following year. Consequentially, in the 1868 election the following year, Republicans won elections in a landslide. The newly elected legislative branch of South Carolina, the General Assembly, was majority African American. As instructed by President Andrew Johnson, the new legislature began creating a new constitution that was not going to resurrect the old South. The new constitution provided representation according to population, rather than by population and wealth, as the formula in place previously had done. It eliminated property qualifications for voting and guaranteed universal male suffrage. The Constitution of 1868 was the first South Carolina constitution that required a "uniform system of free public schools throughout the State". It legalized interracial marriages and barred the public accommodation of public facilities; any person violating anti-segregation laws was required to forfeit his business license and pay a $1,000 fine, and be imprisoned for up to five years at hard labor. Additionally, African Americans were elected to other higher offices, including federal offices, as indicated below:

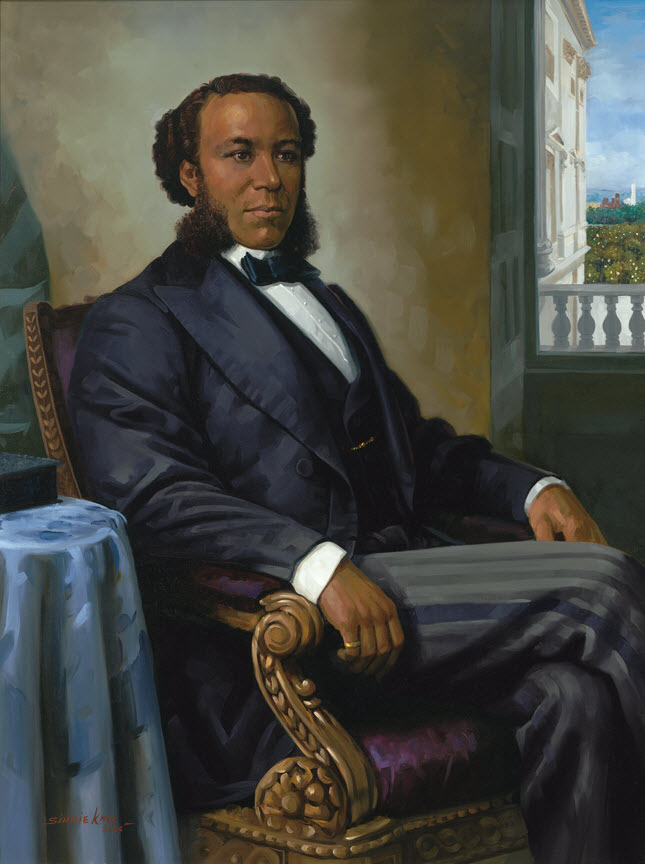
Joseph Rainey, the first African American to serve in the U.S. House of Representatives. He served 1870-1879 from SC's 1st District.

- U.S. House of Representatives
  - Joseph Rainey
  - Robert Smalls (1875–1879; 1882–1883; 1884–1887)
  - Alonzo J. Ransier (1873–1875)
  - Richard H. Cain (1873–1875; 1877–1879)
  - Robert B. Elliott (1871–1874)
  - George W. Murray
  - Robert C. De Large
  - Thomas E. Miller
- Lieutenant Governor
  - Alonzo J. Ransier (1870–1872)
  - Richard Howell Gleaves (1872–1876)
- Other offices
  - Robert B. Elliott, Attorney General (1876–1877)
  - Francis Lewis Cardozo, Secretary of State, (1868–1872)
  - Richard Theodore Greener, Superintendent of Education
  - Jonathan Jasper Wright, Supreme Court (1870–1877)
  - Stephen Atkins Swails, mayor of Kingstree

See more: African American officeholders during Reconstruction

== Post-Reconstruction ==
=== Black Codes ===
Black codes in South Carolina were a series of laws meant to prevent African Americans of civil liberties. Black codes applied only to "persons of color," defined as including anyone with more than one eighth, or 12.5% "Negro blood." Below are some examples of Black codes passed by the South Carolina General Assembly.

XXXV. All persons of color who make contracts for service or labor, shall be known as servants, and those with whom they contract, shall be known as masters.

X. A person of color who is in the employment of a master engaged in husbandry shall not have the right to sell any corn, rice, peas, wheat, or other grain, any flour, cotton, fodder, hay, bacon, fresh meat of any kind, poultry of any kind, animal of any kind, or any other product of a farm, without having written evidence from such master that he has the right to sell such product.

XIV. It shall not be lawful for a person of color to be owner, in whole or in part, of any distiller where spirituous liquors, or in retailing the same, in a shop or elsewhere

LXXII. No person of color shall pursue or practice the art, trade or business of an artisan, mechanic or shop-keeper, or any other trade, employment or...on his own account and for his own benefit, or in partnership with a white person, or as agent or servant of any persons, until he shall have obtained a license therefore from the Judge of the District Court; which license shall be good for one year only.

— Acts of the General Assembly of the State of South Carolina: Passed at the Sessions of 1864-65

The enforcement of black codes was an effort by the Democrats and white supremacists to maintain a system of racial inequality and hierarchy that existed before the Civil War. Black codes, in addition to poll taxes, literacy tests, and intimidation meant that the Democratic party in South Carolina was virtually unopposed until the Civil Rights Movement in the 1950s.

=== Voter Suppression ===
Between the mid-1870s and the early 1970s, African Americans were largely unable to vote in South Carolina. Though the Fifteenth amendment protected black men's right to vote, poll taxes, literacy tests, and intimidation from groups like the Ku Klux Klan meant that African American turnouts for elections were extremely low. By 1940, African American voters accounted for only 0.8 percent of those of voting age in the state.

==== Literacy Tests and Poll Taxes ====
South Carolina required voters to complete a voter application in order to vote. One of the stipulations of the application was that voters must be able to "(a) both read and write a section of the Constitution of South Carolina; or (b)...have paid all taxes due last year on property in this State assessed at $300.00 or more." Many former slaves could not read or afford the $300 property tax requirement and were consequentially denied their vote. The test was highly arbitrary; the examiner, almost always a white male, could deny anyone the ability to vote based on his judgment alone. For example, if a man read the entire South Carolina constitution, but mispronounced one word, the examiner could still refuse the voter access to the polling facility. The state of South Carolina asserted that poll taxes were not voting qualifications but instead a method of funding public schools, though historians and scholars today dispute this claim. In 1923, South Carolina's poll tax was $1.00, or approximately $15 in 2020 dollars. After the Civil War, many African Americans worked farming jobs as sharecroppers. In the 1920s, the average weekly wage of a sharecropper was between $5 and $6. The $1.00 poll tax would have accounted for approximately one day's wage, or 20% of one week's wage.

==== Intimidation ====
Toward the end of Reconstruction, African Americans were discouraged from voting through intimidation and violence. The Ku Klux Klan, or KKK, was one of the most prominent terrorist groups in the state that emerged in the 1870s. In 1871, evidence emerged that African Americans were being murdered or terrorized by the Klan; in York County alone, eleven African Americans were murdered and 600 were whipped. Governor Robert Scott refused to declare martial law or combat the violence of the Klan. Later that year, President Ulysses S. Grant signed the Ku Klux Klan Act, which made it a federal crime to prevent any American citizens from exercising their rights. In nine South Carolina counties, Grant declared martial law and arrested approximately 600 Klansmen; 53 pleaded guilty and five were convicted at trial. Temporarily, the number of incidents of lynching and terrorism significantly reduced but increased again after the Compromise of 1877 in which President Hayes removed federal troops from the South.

Klan activity in South Carolina was much more predominant in the upstate where the African American population was not as heavy. Between 1882 and 1968, there were 4,743 reported lynching in South Carolina. Many historians, however, reject the validity of this number, asserting that as many as 60% of lynchings were unreported or undocumented. The majority of victims killed or abused by the Klan were Republican African Americans, though some Republican whites suffered the same fate in smaller numbers.

A group with similar motives to the Ku Klux Klan was the Red Shirts. The 1876 South Carolina Red Shirts Battle Plan stated: "Every Democrat must feel honor bound to control the vote of at least one Negro, by intimidation...In speeches to Negroes you must remember that they can only be influenced by their fears, superstitions and cupidity. Treat them so as to show them you are the superior race and that their natural position is that of subordination to the white man." The Red Shirts were less secretive than the KKK, working more openly, but both organizations had the same goal: return Democrats to power.

== Jim Crow Era and early 20th century ==
=== Legal Limitations ===
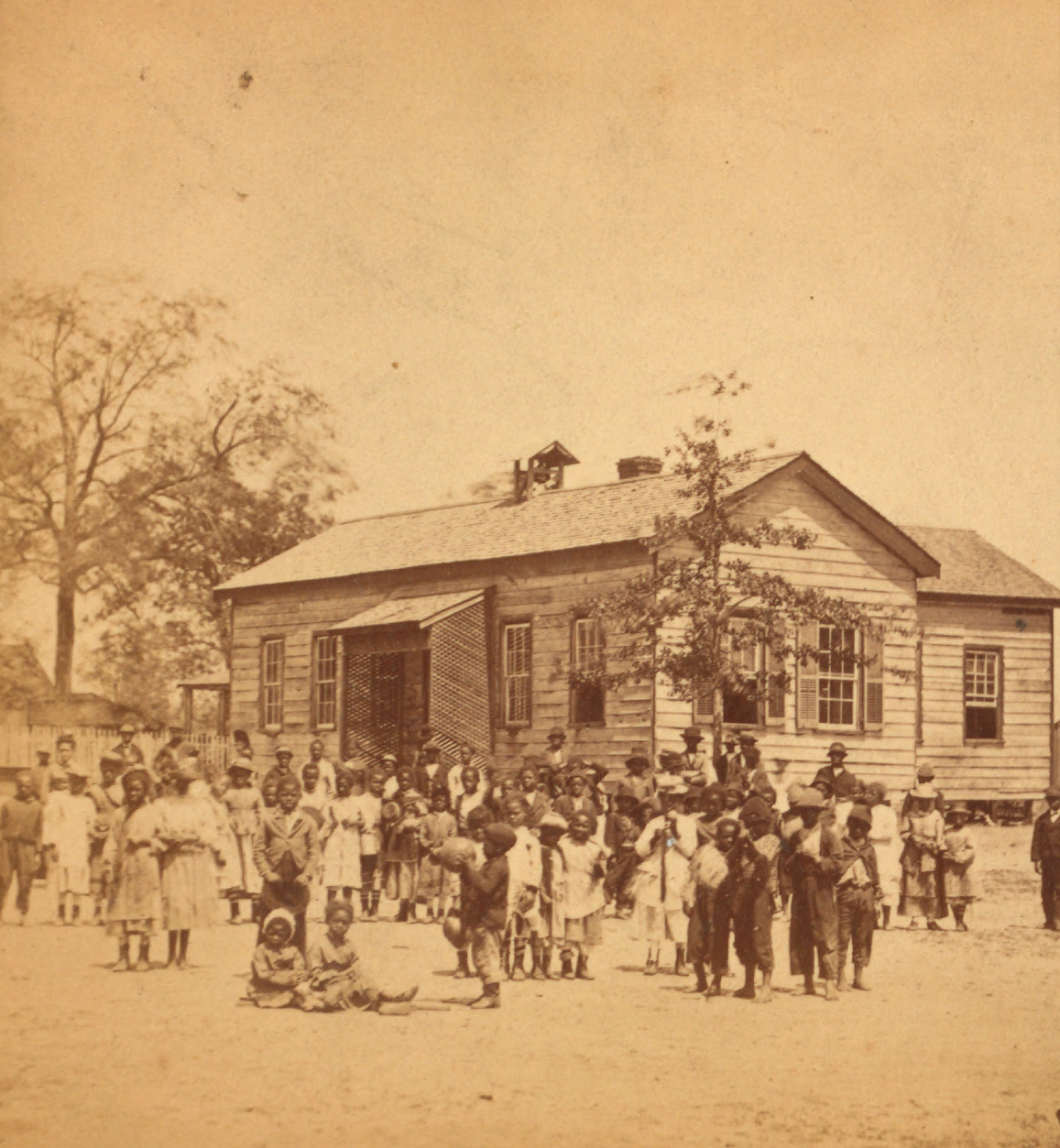
Colored school in Aiken, SC c. 1870s or '80s.

After the Plessy v. Ferguson (1896) decision, race-based segregation was legal across the United States, though such separation had already rooted itself in South Carolina's culture and custom. In a 1900 speech on the floor of the United States Senate, one of South Carolina U.S. Senators, Benjamin Tillman said: "We of the South have never recognized the right of the negro to govern the white man, and we never will. We have never believed him to be equal to the white man, and we will not submit to his gratifying his lust on our wives and daughters without lynching him. I would to God the last one of them was in Africa and that none of them had ever been brought to our shores."

Beginning in the late 1870s, Democrats repealed most of the laws passed by Republicans during the Reconstruction era, thus revoking civil liberties and rights from South Carolina African Americans. For instance, an 1879 miscegenation statute prohibited interracial marriages, stating "Marriage between a white person and an Indian, Negro, mulatto, mestizo, or half-breed shall be null and void." This law was not overturned until the Loving v. Virginia (1967) Supreme Court case. In 1895, the General Assembly created a new constitution, which required "No children of either race "shall ever be permitted to attend a school provided for children of the other race." An 1898 statue required that railroad companies provide separate cars for white and colored passengers. A similar statue in 1905 required the segregation of streetcars. State and municipal codes prohibited whites and blacks from eating in the same portion of a restaurant, using the same public facilities (such as drinking fountains or bathrooms), and required segregated seating. A 1952 state code compelled cotton textile manufacturers to prohibit different races from working together in the same room or from using the same exits or bathrooms. Another 1952 statue made it a crime for any colored person to adopt or take custody of a white child.

Likewise, African Americans struggled to enter the workforce in skilled positions. Many African Americans worked as sharecropped, in which they made little money. Factories and business owners often favored white employees over black employees, and if black employees were hired, they were typically paid less than whites. In 1896, Lucy Hughes Brown became the first female African American physician in the state. She co-founded the Hospital and Training School for Nurses in 1897 with Alonzo Clifton McClennan, an African American doctor.

Cultural rules in Jim Crow South Carolina also kept African Americans in a position of inferiority. For example, a South Carolina customed required African Americans to address whites in certain ways: "If you are white, never say 'Mr.', 'Mrs.', 'sir', or 'ma'am' to nonwhites and always call them by their first names. If you are nonwhite, always say 'Mr.', 'Mrs.', 'sir', or "ma'am" to whites and never call them by their first name." These unwritten rules prohibited whites and blacks from shaking hands and required blacks to remove hats when speaking to whites. Failure to abide by these rules could lead to blacks being arrested, whipped, or lynched. Federal reforms meant to help African Americans were mostly lost. The Freedmen's Bureau was largely ineffective, and the 13th, 14th, and 15th amendments to the U.S. Constitution were denied to African Americans.

=== Charleston Race Riots of 1919 ===
In Charleston, after five white men at the Charleston Naval Shipyard felt that they had been cheated by a black man, they searched for him. Unable to find him, they attacked African Americans at random. One of the men they attacked, Issac Doctor, fired in self-defense. Word quickly spread about the shooting and, within an hour, over 1,000 white sailors and a few white citizens gathered in the city street. The white sailors raided shooting galleries and stole firearms. The mob marched around the city attacking African Americans and their businesses and homes. Some businesses and stores were looted. The riot was controlled by police by 2:30 a.m., three and one-half hours after its start. Consequentially, 6 African Americans died, 17 suffered serious injuries, and 35 were admitted to hospitals. Seven white sailors and one police officer were seriously injured, and eight sailors were admitted to hospitals. Lacking evidence, police arrested 49 men accused of inciting a riot, but the charges were dropped. 8 received $50 fines for unlawful weapon possession.

=== The Great Migration ===
The Great Migration was the movement of 6 million African Americans out of the rural Southern United States to the urban Northeast, Midwest, and West that occurred between 1916 and 1970. In 1900, South Carolina's African American population was approximately 58%, a majority. By 1970, the population decreased to 30%. African Americans emigrated from the state to escape Jim Crow laws, racial violence, and to find higher-paying jobs.

== World War II ==
Throughout the 1930s and 1940s, African Americans in South Carolina continued to live in segregated neighborhoods, attend segregated schools, and utilize segregated public facilities. Many young African American men, either voluntarily or by the draft, went to Europe and the South Pacific after the Bombing of Pearl Harbor to fight the Axis. The military remained segregated until President Harry Truman signed an executive order after World War II to integrate the armed forces. While all servicemen faced difficulties and tribulations during their time in the military, African Americans faced greater challenges. Bura Walker was a black enlisted soldier who was promoted to the rank warrant officer at Fort Jackson, a rank which very few African Americans achieved. Because of the state's segregation laws, Walker could not move into the officer quarters because his fellow officers were all white. Many black veterans recalled that they were treated more poorly by officers than white soldiers and were not respected by their fellow enlistees.

African Americans who remained in South Carolina still struggled to participate in the political process and were often denied the ability to work skilled jobs. The Charleston Naval Yard, which employed mostly white men before the war, saw a large increase in the number of female and African American workers during World War II. More than 6,000 blacks were hired by the Naval Yard, though when the war was over, white veterans were usually favored over black employees. In summer of 1942, many rumors spread that black citizens were stockpiling war materials in Charleston, convincing the mayor to cancel the annual black Labor Day parade. Another Charleston resident remembers seeing two African Americans attempt to sit at the front of a city bus, something strictly prohibited by the Jim Crow laws of the time. When the bus driver told them to move back they seemed to hesitate. At that, the driver pulled out a pistol and ordered the two African Americans to the rear, and they quickly complied and no further incident occurred.

== Civil Rights Movement ==
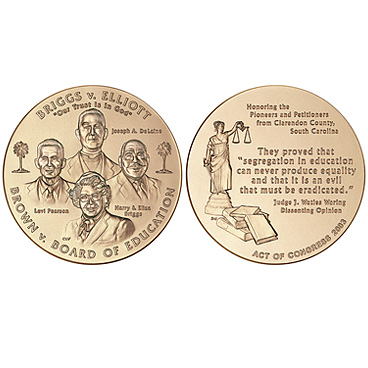
2003 Brown et al. v. the Board of Education of Topeka et al. Congressional Gold Medal

Like much of the nation during the 1950s and 1960s, African Americans in South Carolina led peaceful and nonviolent protests against unfair segregation laws. However, much of the national spotlight during the civil rights movement focused on Alabama and Mississippi. Much of the civil rights movement in South Carolina happened without many riots or violence, except in a few cases.

In Greenville, the Greenville Eight consisted of African American college students sitting protesting the segregated library system by entering the white-only branch. In Columbia, black students at Allen University and Benedict College led protests throughout the city. In Orangeburg, South Carolina, students at South Carolina State University and Claflin University led protests and marches to challenge desegregation.

Throughout the 1950s and 1960s, many businesses, institutions, and governments resisted integration. In 1956, U.S. Senator Strom Thurmond of South Carolina authored the Southern Manifesto, which denounced the 1954 Brown v. Board decision as "unwarranted" and referred to anti-segregationists as "agitators and troublemakers invading our States." Many school districts ignored the Brown v. Board of Education decision in 1954; some districts were still segregated into the 1970s.

In 1972, Governor John Carl West signed the Human Affairs Law, creating the South Carolina Human Affairs Commission. The Commission is tasked with investigation, mediating, and litigating claims of racial and other forms of discrimination in employment, housing, and public services.

== Modern South Carolina ==
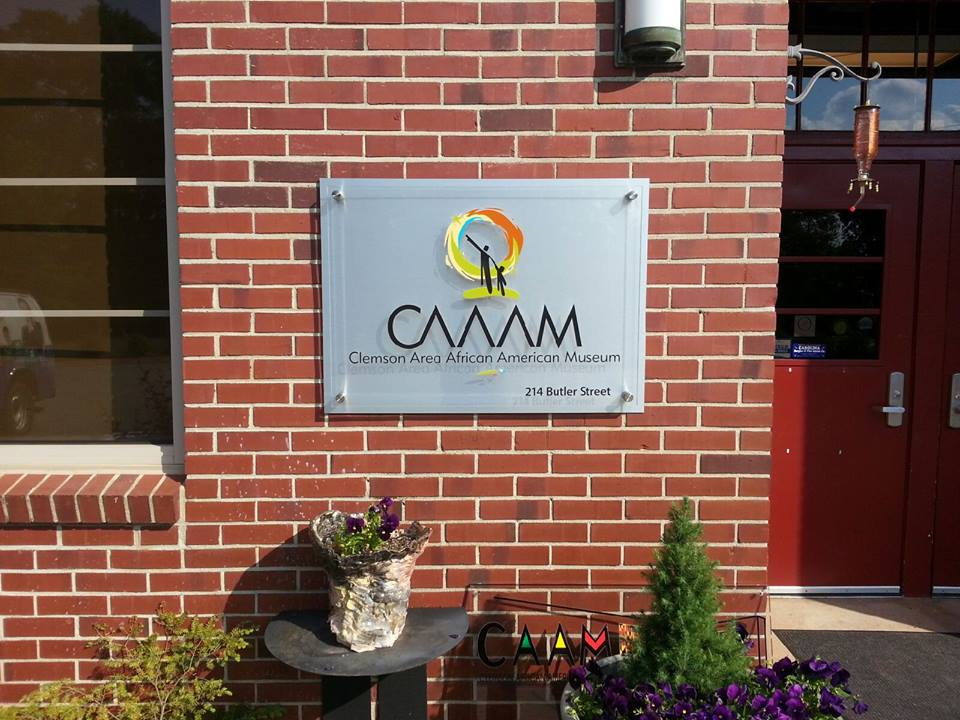
Clemson Area African American Museum in Clemson, South Carolina

=== Politics ===
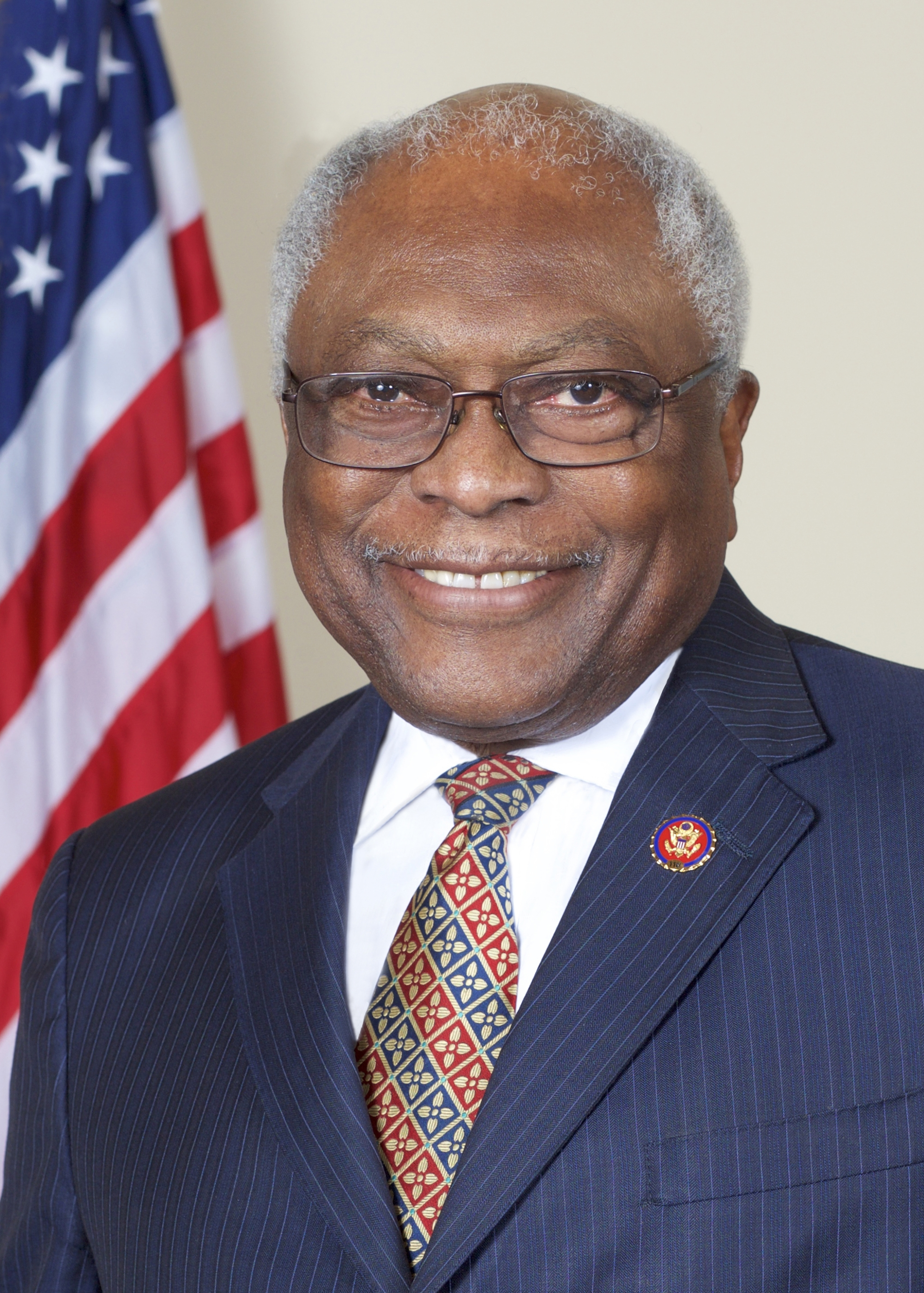
Jim Clyburn (D)

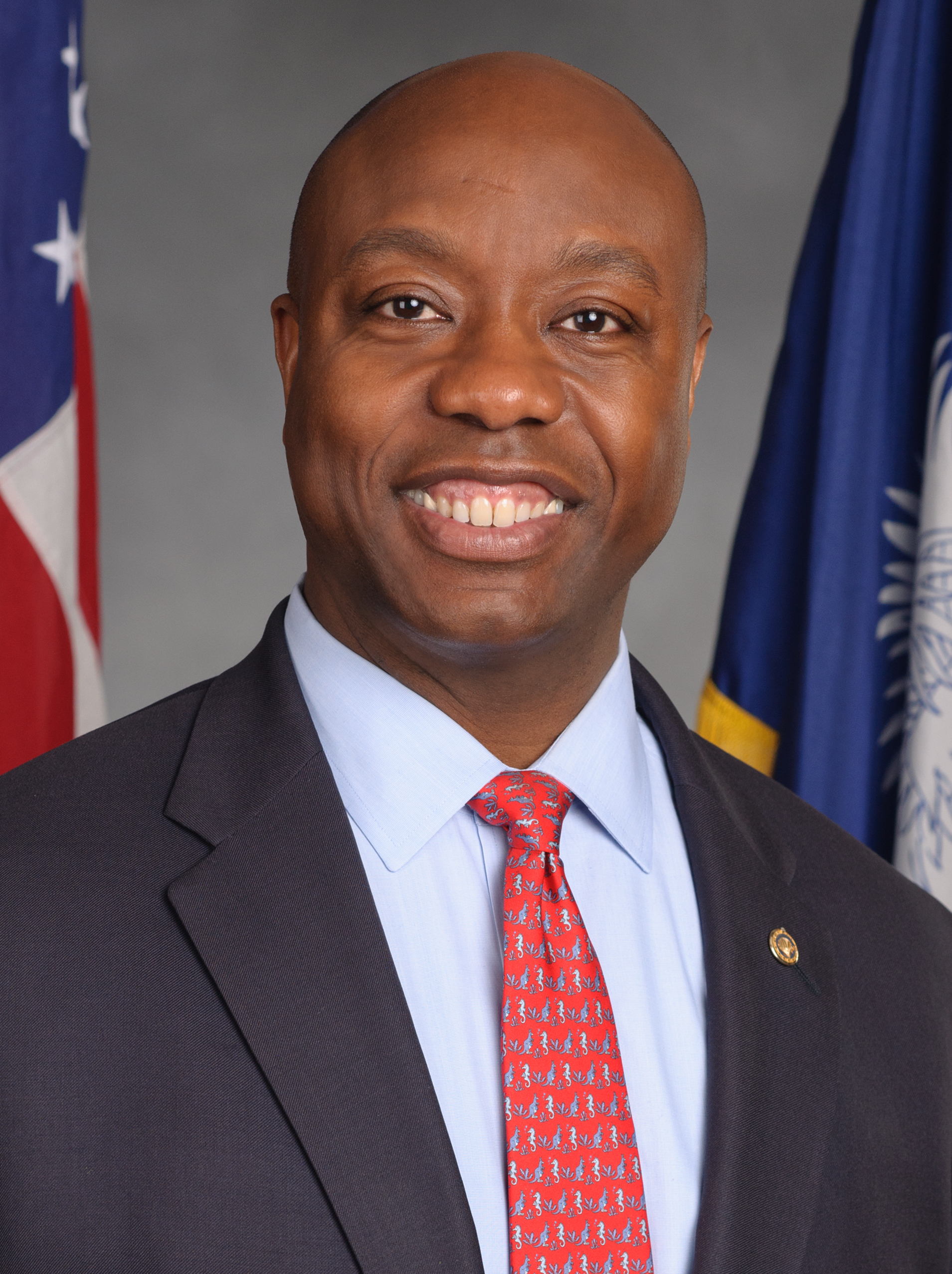
Tim Scott (R)
U.S. Senator

In 1993, Jim Clyburn was elected to the U.S. House of Representatives from South Carolina's 6th congressional district. Clyburn served as the House Majority Whip from 2007 to 2011, and from 2019 to 2023. In 2012, Governor Nikki Haley appointed U.S. Representative Tim Scott to fill the vacancy created by Jim DeMint's resignation. Scott became the first African American man to serve on the U.S. Senate from South Carolina. Scott won the 2014 special election, and won reelection in 2016. In July 2010, Stephen K. Benjamin became the first African American mayor of Columbia. In 2006, Terence Roberts became the first African American mayor of Anderson. In 2015, Barbara Blain-Bellamy became the first African American female mayor in the state in Conway. In December 2019, Barry Walker became the first African American mayor of Irmo. In 2024, Reggie L. Burgess became the first African American mayor of North Charleston.

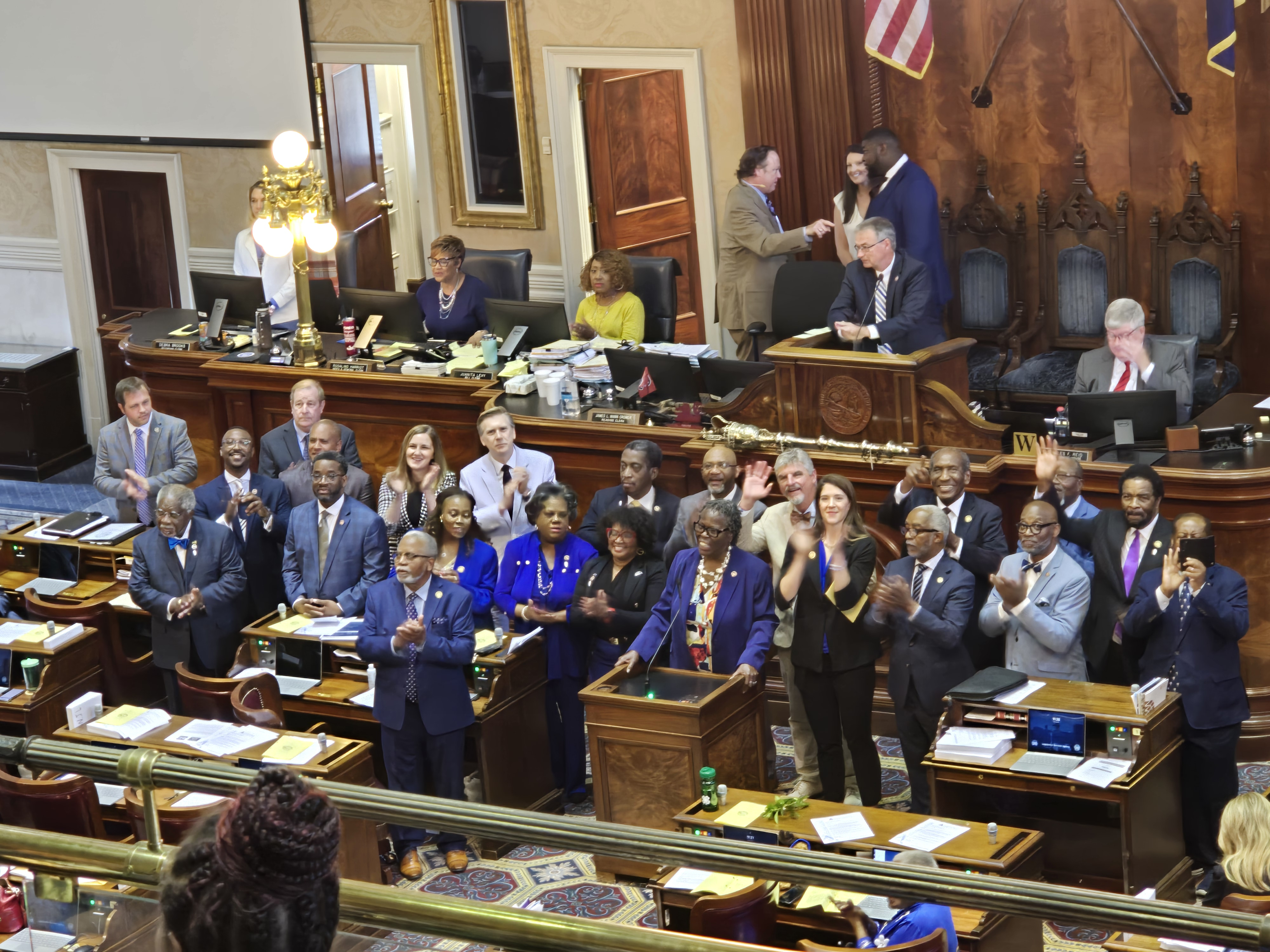
Members of the South Carolina House of Representatives, 2025.

As of 2020, 44 of 172 members of the South Carolina General Assembly were African American, accounting for about 26%.

In the 2016 Presidential Election African Americans in South Carolina chiefly voted for the Democratic Party. According to a CNN exit poll, 94% of voting African Americans voted for Hillary Clinton, while 4% voted for Donald Trump, who carried the state's nine electoral votes.

=== Demographics ===
According to 2017 census estimates, African Americans account for 27.3% of South Carolina's population, a number which has been steadily declining since the beginning of the twentieth century.

Many blacks leaving South Carolina are now recently moving to other Southern cities with more job opportunities including Atlanta, Charlotte, Dallas, Houston, Raleigh and San Antonio.

According to the 2010 census, of the 46 counties in South Carolina, there are 12 that have a majority-black population. The counties with black populations above 55% are listed below:

- Allendale, 73.6%
- Williamsburg County, 65.8%
- Bamberg County, 65.5%
- Lee County, 63.3%
- Orangeburg County, 62.2%
- Fairfield County, 59.1%
- Marion, 55.9%

Legend
Color	Group
	African American
	White American
	Other

Historical South Carolina Racial Breakdown of Population

=== Events ===
==== Charleston church shooting ====
President Obama delivers eulogy address for SC Senator Clementa Pinckney who was assassinated by Dylann Roof.

Governor Nikki Haley Discusses the Confederate Flag on Statehouse Grounds

On June 17, 2015, Dylann Roof, a 21-year-old white supremacist, entered Emanuel African Methodist Episcopal Church and attended Bible study with 12 others. Near the end of the lesson, Roof said pointed a gun at one of the church members and said, "I have to do it. You rape our women and you're taking over our country. And you have to go." Roof fired, killing nine and wounding three. Among those dead was South Carolina Senator Clementa C. Pinckney. Roof reportedly shouted racial slurs as he carried out the shooting. Roof attempted to commit suicide but ran out of ammunition. He was arrested the following day in Shelby, North Carolina. Roof later admitted that he was led by racist motives to kill Pinckney and others at the church, and he chose the Emanuel church in particular because it is one of the oldest in South Carolina, founded in 1817. In December 2016, a jury convicted Roof of 33 counts of hate crime and murder charges. In 2017, he was sentenced to death for these charges.

Dylann Roof had posted many images of himself on social media boasting a Confederate Flag, the same flag that flew on the South Carolina Statehouse grounds. After the shooting, calls to remove the Confederate flag from the Statehouse grounds intensified, including from influential figures such as President Barack Obama, Mitt Romney, and Jeb Bush. On June 20, three days after the shooting, several thousand people gathered at the Statehouse to protest the flag's display. Bree Newsome, an African American civil rights activist, was arrested for scaling the flag pole and removing the flag, though it was replaced within the hour. Counter-protesters at the Statehouse, though fewer in number, advocated keeping the flag on the grounds. The flag had been added to the Statehouse dome during the Civil Rights Movement in the early 1960s. In 1996, Republican Governor David Beasley advocated to remove the flag, a stance that contributed to his failure to win reelection against Democrat Jim Hodges. In 2000, the flag was removed from the Statehouse dome to a location on the grounds where it stood until 2015.

Republican Governor Nikki Haley called for the flag's removal, stating, "We are not going to allow this symbol to divide us any longer." Other national figures endorsed Haley's decision, including Senate Majority Leader Mitch McConnell and Texas Governor Rick Perry. On June 26, the state senate voted 103–10 to remove the flag, and by the House, 94–20. Haley signed the bill, and the flag was removed on July 10 and added to the South Carolina Confederate Relic Room & Military Museum.

==== Walter Scott Shooting ====
On April 4, 2015, Walter Scott was shot in the back by a police officer in North Charleston. The officer, Michael Slager, stopped Scott because of a non-functioning third brake light. The video from Slager's dashcam shows him approaching Scott's car, speaking to Scott, and then returning to his patrol car. Scott exited his car and fled with Slager giving chase on foot. Slager fired his taser, hitting Scott. Scott fled and Slager fired eight rounds; Scott was struck from the rear five times. A nearby citizen filmed the incident.

The mayor of North Charleston ordered that every police officer in the city would be required to wear a body camera, and the South Carolina Senate allocated $3.4 million to be used for body cams within the state. National leaders, such as the Reverend Al Sharpton, encouraged charges to be brought up against the police officer. The Black Lives Matter movement protested Scott's death. Slager said that he "felt threatened" by Scott, but ultimately, Slager was charged with murder and was subsequently sentenced to 20 years in prison.

==== George Floyd protests ====
After the murder of George Floyd in Minneapolis, Minnesota on May 25, 2020, protests erupted across the United States. In South Carolina, protests were mostly peaceful. Many of the largest cities imposed curfews following a day of violence throughout the state. Several businesses and restaurants in downtown Columbia were vandalized. Protesters torched three police cruisers and unsuccessfully attempted to burn down several buildings. In Charleston, protesters stopped traffic on Interstate-26.

==== Million Man March (2020) ====
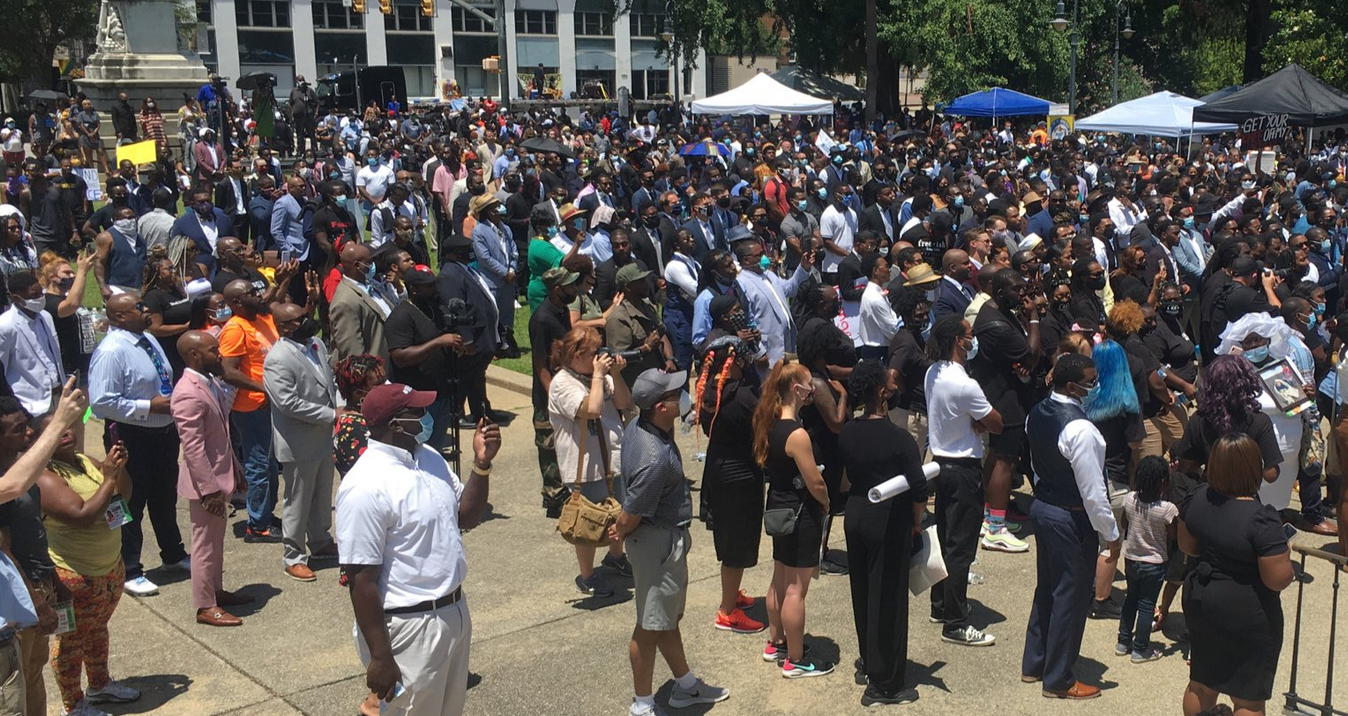
Million Man March in Columbia, SC -- June 14, 2020

On June 14, 2020, thousands marched from Martin Luther King Park in Five Points to the Statehouse in Columbia. The march was a tribute to the Million Man March led by in Washington, D.C. in 1995. According to Leo Jones, the event's organizer, the goal of the march was to protest racial injustice and was an extension of the George Floyd protests that had occurred in the prior weeks. Marchers were encouraged to wear their "Sunday best" and to register to vote after the march if unregistered. Tents were set up on the Statehouse grounds that allowed people to register to vote. Columbia Mayor Stephen K. Benjamin, Richland County Sheriff Leon Lott, and Columbia Police Chief Skip Holbrook participated in the march. Additionally, groups that supported the march were 100 Black Men, and the NAACP.

== Culture ==
Charleston red rice and boiled peanuts, also known as goobers, are notable foods from South Carolina that have African roots. The culinary traditions of South Carolina were significantly shaped by African slaves. Various vegetables, including yams, okra, peas, and beans, were brought to the United States from Africa and subsequently cultivated by enslaved individuals. South Carolina boasts a vibrant musical heritage deeply embedded in African American traditions, featuring Gullah spirituals, Piedmont blues, early jazz, and Carolina beach music.

== Scholars of African American History in South Carolina ==
- Septima Poinsette Clark - educator and civil rights activist
- Esau Jenkins - Human Rights leader, businessman, local preacher, and community organizer
- Valinda W. Littlefield, Ph.D. - USC Professor specializing in African American History, and community leader
- Walter Edgar - American historian and author specializing in Southern history and culture

== Notable people ==
Experts have compiled longer lists.

=== Science ===
- Charles Bolden
- Ernest Everett Just
- Ronald McNair

=== Politics ===
- Steve Benjamin - First African-American Mayor of Columbia, Advisor to President Joe Biden
- Charlotta Bass - newspaper publisher, Civil Rights leader, first African-American woman to run for national office – Vice President of the United States
- Harvey B. Gantt
- Jesse Jackson

=== Healthcare ===
- Anna DeCosta Banks - nursing pioneer
- Lucy Hughes Brown
- Matilda Evans
- Alonzo Clifton McClennan

=== Education ===
- Augusta Baker - University of South Carolina's Storyteller-in-Residence.
- Mary McLeod Bethune - founder of Bethune-Cookman University, Special Advisor on Minority Affairs to Roosevelt, founded the National Council for Negro Women
- Septima Poinsette Clark
- Mary Gordon Ellis
- Ruby Middleton Forsythe
- Lucille Simmons Whipper

=== Law ===
- Matthew J. Perry

=== Military ===
- Webster Anderson - Congressional Medal of Honor for service in Vietnam War

=== Entertainment and Art ===
- Charlamagne Tha God - Radio personality, actor
- Kimberly Clarice Aiken - Miss America 1994
- Clayton "Peg Leg" Bates - tap dancer
- Paul Benjamin - actor
- Kitty Black Perkins - principal designer for Mattel's Barbie fashions
- Chadwick Boseman
- James Brown
- Chubby Checker
- Viola Davis
- Althea Gibson
- Dizzy Gillespie
- Mary Jackson (artist)
- Eartha Kitt
- Darius Rucker
- Cecil J. Williams

== See also ==
- History of slavery in South Carolina
- Black Southerners
- History of South Carolina
- Antebellum South Carolina
- Demographics of South Carolina
- List of African-American historic places in South Carolina
- List of African-American newspapers in South Carolina
