= James H. Conyers =

US Navy sailor and USNA mid-shipman (1855–1935)

James Henry Conyers (October 24, 1855, in South Carolina – November 29, 1935) was the first African-American person admitted to the United States Naval Academy.

== Early life ==
James H. Conyers was born in Charleston, South Carolina. He was a son of John Peter Conyers, of Edisto Island, South Carolina and the former Catherine Caulder of Charleston. It is not clear if the Conyers family had been slaves; but at the end of the Civil War his father worked as a laborer in Charleston, and may have worked for Francis L. Cardozo, a leading African-American Reconstruction politician. James Conyers received his early education at the Avery Normal Institute in Charleston and at that time worked as a messenger in the office of the South Carolina Secretary of State.

== Admission to U.S. Naval Academy ==
In 1872, the 16 year old James Conyers was nominated as a candidate for appointment to the Naval Academy by South Carolina congressman Robert B. Elliott. After successfully completing "competitive district examinations after [his nomination as a midshipman] and passing the final test examinations at Annapolis", Conyers received his appointment as a "cadet-midshipman" and was sworn in on September 24, 1872. Contemporary newspapers noted favorably on Conyers, describing him as having a "complexion of about brown coffee color, with the usual curly hair of his race, and stands five feet three inches tall."

== Life at the Academy ==
From the beginning, Conyers met with difficulty, being subjected to all manner of hazing by his fellow midshipmen. He was cursed at, spat upon and physically manhandled. Some of his classmates even attempted to drown him. In the fall of 1872, Conyers was marching in formation when he was kicked and punched by several other midshipmen, among them the Academy's boxing champion George Goodfellow. News of the incident and the constant hazing experienced by Conyers leaked to the newspapers, and a three-man board was convened to investigate the attacks. Goodfellow denied any wrongdoing and Conyers claimed he could not identify any of his attackers. The board nonetheless concluded that: "His persecutors are left then without any excuse or palliation except the inadmissible one of prejudice." To give Conyers a fair chance at succeeding on his own merits, they believed strong measures should be taken. In the end Goodfellow and two others were dismissed from the Academy.

The abuse continued in more subtle forms, however, and Conyers' grades suffered. After surviving another hazing incident where nine midshipmen (including Andrew Summers Rowan) were subsequently dismissed from the Naval Academy due to their involvement, Conyers finally resigned in October 1873.

== Later life ==
James Conyers fell into obscurity. Where fellow black midshipmen Alonzo Clifton McClennan, who became a prosperous Charleston doctor, and Henry Edwin Baker, who graduated from Howard University Law School, worked as a patent examiner in the United States Patent Office, and authored a number of books and articles, became well-known after they left Annapolis, Conyers almost completely dropped out of sight.

He returned to Charleston and got a job working in the shipyards as a ship's caulker, a profession he followed for the rest of his life. On August 28, 1881, Conyers married eighteen year old Fannie Elizabeth Steele in Charleston; they would have nine children, of whom seven would live to maturity.

James H. Conyers died at his home at 29 Doughty Street (now part of the campus of the Medical University of South Carolina) in the city of Charleston on November 29, 1935 and was buried the following December 1 at the Humane and Friendly Society Cemetery in Charleston.

In 2013, a copy of Stephen B. Luce's textbook SEAMANSHIP with the signature of "Cadet Midshipman J. Henry Conyers" on the flyleaf with the inscription "Cadet Midn. J Henry Conyers/ U S Naval Academy/ Annapolis Md./ June 13, 1873… Written on board US Ship Santee/ Don’t give up the ship’/ Lawrence," (referring to U.S. Navy Captain James Lawrence's last words after being mortally wounded during the War of 1812) was presented for sale by Quinn's and Waverly Auctions of Falls Church, Virginia with a starting bid of $1,500 USD.

== See also ==
- List of African-American firsts
- List of African-American pioneers in desegregation of higher education
- James Webster Smith, first African American admitted to the U.S. Military Academy
