= James Webster Smith =

American professor and a cadet at the United States Military Academy (1850–1876)

- Born: June 1850; Columbia, South Carolina, U.S.
- Died: November 30, 1876 (aged 26); Columbia, South Carolina, U.S.
- Military career
- Allegiance: United States
- Branch: United States Army
- Service years: 1870—1874
- Rank: Second lieutenant (posthumous)
- Other work: University professor

James Webster Smith (June 1850 – November 30, 1876) was an American professor and a cadet at the United States Military Academy. A former slave, Smith became a scholar and is recognized as the first black person appointed to a cadetship at West Point. His tenure at the academy, from 1870 to 1874, was fraught with racial prejudice and ended with Smith's formal dismissal a year before completing his studies. Embittered by his experience, Smith nonetheless found success as a professor at South Carolina Agricultural and Mechanical Institute. He died of tuberculosis in 1876.

Although Smith's military career was curtailed by racism, he later served as the Commander of Cadets at South Carolina Agricultural and Mechanical Institute.

In 1996, at the request of South Carolina Congressman John Spratt, President Bill Clinton approved the posthumous commission of James Webster Smith, to the rank of 2nd lieutenant of the U.S. Army. At the ceremony, Spratt stated: “It's an atonement, long overdue, for what James Webster Smith had to suffer at West Point.”

Often overlooked in black history, Smith's tenure at West Point is obscured by the accomplishments of Henry Ossian Flipper, the first black cadet to graduate from West Point.

== Biography ==
James Webster Smith was born in 1850 in Columbia, South Carolina. His parents Israel and Catherine Smith were slaves. After the abolishment of slavery, Israel, a mulatto man, worked as a carpenter before becoming one of Columbia's aldermen. When the Civil War ended, Smith attended school through the Freedmen's Bureau, one function of which was to provide an educational system for the newly freedmen during the Reconstruction Era. David Clark, a benefactor from Connecticut, was so impressed by the progress shown by Smith that he arranged for him to accompany Clark to Hartford to advance his education in the city's school system; the pair arrived in April 1867.

At Hartford, Smith continued to excel and later attended Hartford High School where he graduated with honors on April 22, 1870. On May 1, 1870, with the backing of Clark and Oliver Otis Howard, he enrolled at Howard University, a prestigious institute founded by Howard. Smith, however, only attended Howard University briefly before representative Solomon L. Hoge of South Carolina recommended him for entry into the United States Military Academy—better known as West Point. Reluctantly, Clark agreed to send Smith to West Point for his preliminary exams, knowing he would most likely have to endure racial bigotry if he was accepted.

Smith reported to West Point on May 31, 1870, in preparation for his exams; when rumors to this effect quickly swept the academy, he immediately faced opposition from cadets: "[I] had not been there an hour before I had been reminded by several thoughtful cadets that I was 'nothing but a damned nigger'", he recollected. Oftentimes, Smith and his roommate, another black nominee named Michael Howard, were the subjects of hazing and physical abuse by the cadets. Smith passed his preliminary exams but Howard was rejected and sent home, leaving Smith as the first and only black cadet of West Point; he was officially admitted into the academy on July 9, 1870.

Resented by his classmates, Smith lived an isolated lifestyle at West Point, enduring harassment and vandalism. His squadmates only drilled with Smith under threats of demotion or court-martial. On August 13, 1870, Smith was confronted by his classmate J.W. Wilson as he went to fill his water pail and return to his post; an altercation ensued and both cadets were arrested. The incident was the subject of the first of three courts-martial issued against Smith. A military tribunal concluded that his original three-week arrest was a sufficient punishment. But a few months later, in January 1871, his third court-martial, charging him with conduct unbecoming of a cadet and gentleman, resulted in a one-year suspension from West Point.

Smith's enrollment at West Point came to a sudden conclusion in June 1874 when he was deemed deficient in his philosophical studies by his professor and recommended for a formal discharge. Desperate for recourse, Smith met with Secretary of War William W. Belknap to request a re-examination but was refused. Henry Ossian Flipper's graduation from West Point three years later—the first African American to accomplish such a feat—incidentally overshadowed Smith's accomplishments. Embittered by the turn of events, he published a series of his memoirs detailing his experiences at the academy in the New National Era and Citizen, a black newspaper. In 1875, Smith arrived in Orangeburg, South Carolina to accept a teaching position at State Agricultural College & Mechanics Institute, instructing courses on mathematics and military tactics.

Smith taught at the university until he succumbed to tuberculosis on November 30, 1876. He was buried in an unmarked grave in Columbia. At the request of South Carolina Congressmen John Spratt and Jim Clyburn, and Senator Strom Thurmond, Smith was posthumously commissioned as a second lieutenant on September 22, 1997.

== See also ==
- Johnson Chesnut Whittaker – early African American cadet at West Point
- James H. Conyers – first African American admitted to the U.S. Naval Academy
- List of African-American pioneers in desegregation of higher education
