= Wallingford Academy =

School in South Carolina, United States

Location
- 342 Meeting Street; Charleston, South Carolina; United States
- Coordinates: 32.788906°N 79.933637°W

Information
- Type: School
- Religious affiliation: Protestant
- Denomination: Presbyterian
- Established: 1865
- Founder: Jonathan C. Gibbs

Wallingford Academy was a school for "Colored" children in Charleston, South Carolina. It was organized by Jonathan C. Gibbs a minister with the Zion Presbyterian Church and opened in 1865. David Brown, a clergyman and teacher moved to Charleston with his wife Hughes Brown to serve as principal.

The school was founded at Zion Presbyterian Church in 1865 before moving to Nassau Street in 1868. The school and Wallingford Church were incorporated by a joint resolution of the state legislature in 1872.

In 1896, nurse training sessions led by Dr. Lucy Hughes Brown included theoretical lectures held in the auditorium of Wallingford Academy. Attempts to hold practical training of African American nurses at the City Hospital and Old Folks Home were rebuffed. In 1897 the Hospital and Training School for Nurses, co-founded by Alonzo Clifton McClennan, was chartered by the South Carolina legislature.
