= Lucy Hughes Brown =

African-American physician

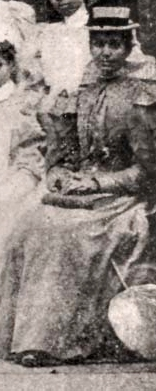
Lucy Hughes Brown, sometime after 1897

Lucy Hughes Brown (April 12, 1863 – June 26, 1911) was the first African-American woman physician licensed to practice in both North Carolina and South Carolina and the cofounder of a nursing school and hospital. Hughes Brown was also an activist and poet.

== Early life and education ==
Lucy Hughes Brown was born an orphan in Mebane, North Carolina, on April 12, 1863 . She attended Scotia Seminary in Concord, graduating in 1885. At Scotia Seminary, she met Sarah Dudley Pettey who introduced her to activism. She went on to study at the Woman’s Medical College of Pennsylvania, graduating with her medical degree in 1894. She was one of fifty-two women in her class. She was also a delegate of the National Federation of Afro-American Women and attended their conference in Washington DC in 1896.

== Poetry ==
After graduating from Scotia Seminary, Hughes began writing poetry. Her two most notable poems are called "Thoughts on Retiring" and "A Retrospective".

== Career ==
Lucy Hughes Brown was granted her license to practice in North Carolina in May 1894, and was one of three women who were licensed that year. Hughes Brown was the first African American woman licensed to practice medicine in North Carolina. Brown practiced medicine in Wilmington, North Carolina for two years, and then in 1896 she and her husband moved to Charleston, SC. She was also South Carolina's first African American woman physician.

By 1900, Hughes Brown resided in Charleston at 11 Nassau street, Dr. Brown was listed as a physician in the city directory, and advertised her services in the paper.

She joined with other black professionals—including Dr. Alonzo Clifton McClennan—to cofound the Canon Hospital and Training School for Nurses in 1897. At the Canon Hospital and Training school, she taught Obstetrical Nursing and Care of Infants. She was head of the school's department of nursing and its associated training program, which graduated its first class in 1898. Brown also was associate editor of the state's first black medical periodical, the Hospital Herald, which was founded in 1898. In 1902, the British Journal of Nursing recognized her as a leader in her profession in South Carolina.

Brown died in Charlotte on June 26, 1911.

== Family Life ==
In 1889 she married David Brown, a clergyman and teacher. Hughes Brown moved to South Carolina because of her husband’s work; Reverend Brown was the principal of Wallingford Academy, a school for African Americans that was set up in 1865, and was organized by a minister with the Zion Presbyterian Church. At the time of Hughes Brown's death, the family had moved to Charlotte, North Carolina, where the Reverend David Brown taught at Biddle University, a “Presbyterian school for males”
