= Ruby Middleton Forsythe =

- 1987 portrait by Brian Lanker
- Born: June 27, 1905; Charleston, South Carolina
- Died: May 29, 1992 (aged 86); Mount Pleasant, South Carolina
- Education: Avery Institute; South Carolina State College
- Occupation: Educator
- Spouse: William Essex Forsythe

Ruby Middleton Forsythe (1905–1992) was an elementary school teacher in South Carolina. She was known for providing education to the African-American community during the "Jim Crow" era. She was the recipient of four honorary doctorates, with a career that spanned more than six decades.

== Biography ==
Forsythe née Middleton was born in Charleston, South Carolina on June 27, 1905. In 1921 she earned her education certificate from the Avery Institute. She went on to earn a BS degree from South Carolina State College.

While she was starting her teaching career in Mount Pleasant, South Carolina, she married the Reverend William Essex Forsythe, who ran the Holy Cross-Faith Memorial Church and School on Pawleys Island, South Carolina. She continued to teach in Mount Pleasant and care for her parents, visiting Reverend Forsythe when she could. In 1938, she joined her husband on Pawley's Island, and taught in a one-room school—the only local educational facility open to African-American children at that time.

Affectionately known as "Miss Ruby", Forsythe taught for more than six decades, even though she and her students were harassed by the Ku Klux Klan. She received four honorary doctorates, and was one of the subjects of the book I Dream A World: Portraits of Black Women Who Changed America, a collection of interviews and photographs by Brian Lanker.

Forsythe died in Mount Pleasant, South Carolina on May 29, 1992.
