= Alonzo Clifton McClennan =

American physician

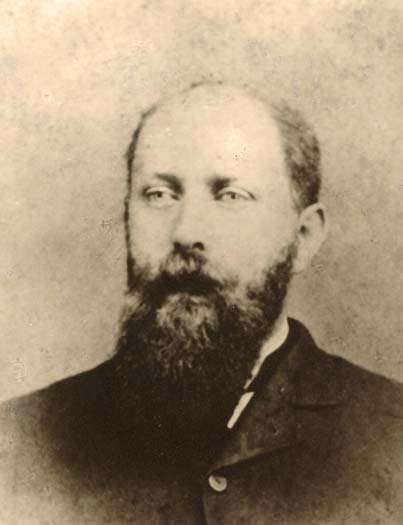
- Born: May 1, 1855; Columbia, South Carolina, US
- Died: April 12, 1912 (aged 56); Charleston, South Carolina, US
- Occupation: Physician
- Known for: Co-founder of the Charleston Hospital and Training School for Nurses

Alonzo Clifton McClennan (May 1, 1855 – April 14, 1912) was an African-American medical doctor who was the co-founder of the Charleston Hospital and Training School for Nurses in Charleston, South Carolina, established to provide for the education of black nurses, care of black patients, and hospital privileges for black doctors. It opened in 1897. McClennan had gone to medical school after being the second African American appointed as a midshipman to United States Naval Academy. He resigned in order to go directly into medicine. Graduating with medical and pharmacy degrees, he married and settled in Charleston, South Carolina, where he set up his medical practice.

== Early life and education ==
McClennan was born in Columbia, South Carolina on 1 May 1855. Orphaned when young by his mother's death, he was raised after the Civil War by his uncle, Edward B. Thompson, a free black barber. He began his higher education at the Benedict Institute in Columbia. He was later appointed as a legislative page in the South Carolina state legislature with the help of another uncle, Samuel B. Thompson, a Republican representative.

McClennan was appointed to the United States Naval Academy in 1873, but resigned four months later. He studied at the Wesleyan Academy in Massachusetts and the University of South Carolina before graduation. He moved to Washington, DC to attend the Howard University College of Medicine, a historically black college. He graduated in 1880 with honors, and degrees in medicine and pharmacy. He returned to the South and initially established a practice in Augusta, Georgia. In 1884 McClennan moved to Charleston, South Carolina.

== Naval Academy and early African-American midshipmen ==
McClennan had met Richard H. Cain when Cain was a South Carolina State Senator and they became friends. After Cain was elected as United States Representative for South Carolina's at-large district, he resolved to make appointments to the service academies. His office conducted a competitive examination in the summer of 1873. While McClennan had long hoped to become a physician, his family's inability to afford college made an appointment to military college a promising stepping-stone. After intense preparation, McClennan placed second in the examination and accepted an appointment to the United States Naval Academy.

McClennan was aware that the first black midshipman, James H. Conyers, had complained of suffering racism at the academy. He did not encounter any racism during the academy entrance examination. But McClennan was of mixed race, with a predominately European appearance: he had blond hair, blue eyes and "was to all appearances a white man". Because of this, he was not visibly classified as black and did not encounter as much racism as did some African Americans.

The year after McClennan's resignation, Henry E. Baker was appointed to the academy and also faced hazing. Baker was dismissed from the academy in Fall 1875 for using "opprobrious language" during a mess hall fight. He was reinstated by Secretary of the Navy George M. Robeson, but racial harassment continued. Baker resigned permanently. After southern states disenfranchised most blacks at the turn of the century, closing out most blacks from federal, state and local elective offices, no other blacks were appointed to the Naval Academy for the following six decades.

== Medical career ==
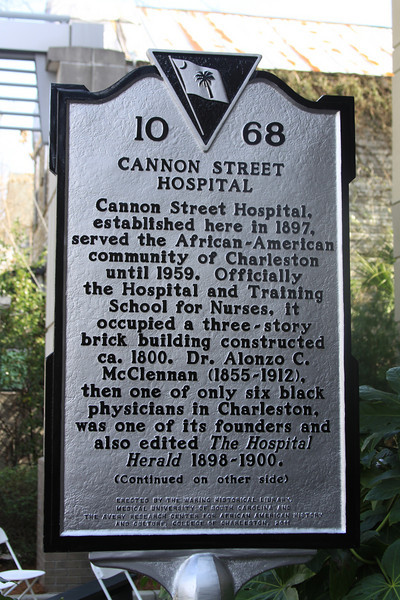
South Carolina Historical Marker commemorating the Cannon Street Hospital. The hospital was founded by Dr. Alonzo C. McClennan and others to serve the black population of Charleston, S.C., and opened in 1897. Dedicated on 28 February 2011.

Four years after graduation from medical school, McClennan moved to Charleston, South Carolina, where he established his practice and gained an "excellent reputation as a physician". In 1892 he opened Charleston's first black drug store, the People's Pharmacy, which became a success. In 1896 McClennan and all but one of Charleston's black physicians lobbied for a hospital to serve Charleston's black population and provide the doctors with otherwise unobtainable hospital privileges. Led by Dr. Lucy Hughes Brown, the training of black nurses began that year with theoretical lectures held in the auditorium of Wallingford Academy; attempts to hold practical training at the City Hospital and Old Folks Home were rebuffed.

The Hospital and Training School for Nurses was chartered by the South Carolina legislature in July 1897, and opened with 24 beds in a three-story building purchased for $4,500 (equivalent to $174,150 in present-day terms). Funds for the purchase of the building and necessary equipment were secured almost entirely by local charity, including support from the Duke Endowment. A historical marker commemorating McClennan and the hospital was erected in 2010 near 135 Cannon Street in Charleston.

== Personal life ==
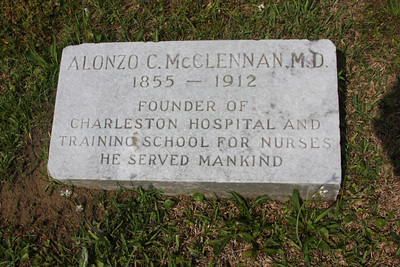
Grave marker of Dr. Alonzo McClennan in the Humane & Friendly Society Cemetery, Charleston, South Carolina, USA.

McClennan married Ida Veronica Ridley, a schoolteacher from a prominent African-American family in Augusta, Georgia. Their home in Charleston became a locus of social life for black elites in the city, and they frequently hosted recitals, literary gatherings, and other social functions. The couple had three children: Maude (1885‒1976), Harriet (b. 1890), and Ridley Ulysses (1887–1921).

Dr. McClennan died in Charleston on 14 April 1912. He is buried in the Humane and Friendly Society Cemetery in Charleston.
