= List of elections in 1896 =

The following elections occurred in 1896:

== North America ==
=== Canada ===
- 1896 Canadian federal election
- December 1896 Edmonton municipal election
- January 1896 Edmonton municipal election
- 1896 Manitoba general election

=== United States ===
- 1896 United States elections

==== United States lieutenant gubernatorial ====
- 1896 Connecticut lieutenant gubernatorial election
- 1896 Illinois lieutenant gubernatorial election
- 1896 Minnesota lieutenant gubernatorial election
- 1896 Missouri lieutenant gubernatorial election
- 1896 Nebraska lieutenant gubernatorial election
- 1896 Texas lieutenant gubernatorial election
- 1896 Wisconsin lieutenant gubernatorial election

==== United States gubernatorial ====
- 1896 Alabama gubernatorial election
- 1896 Arkansas gubernatorial election
- 1896 Colorado gubernatorial election
- 1896 Connecticut gubernatorial election
- 1896 Delaware gubernatorial election
- 1896 Florida gubernatorial election
- 1896 Georgia gubernatorial election
- 1896 Idaho gubernatorial election
- 1896 Illinois gubernatorial election
- 1896 Indiana gubernatorial election
- 1896 Louisiana gubernatorial election
- 1896 Maine gubernatorial election
- 1896 Massachusetts gubernatorial election
- 1896 Michigan gubernatorial election
- 1896 Minnesota gubernatorial election
- 1896 Missouri gubernatorial election
- 1896 Montana gubernatorial election
- 1896 Nebraska gubernatorial election
- 1896 New Hampshire gubernatorial election
- 1896 New York gubernatorial election
- 1896 North Carolina gubernatorial election
- 1896 North Dakota gubernatorial election
- 1896 Rhode Island gubernatorial election
- 1896 South Carolina gubernatorial election
- 1896 South Dakota gubernatorial election
- 1896 Tennessee gubernatorial election
- 1896 Texas gubernatorial election
- 1896 United States gubernatorial elections
- 1896 Vermont gubernatorial election
- 1896 Washington gubernatorial election
- 1896 West Virginia gubernatorial election
- 1896 Wisconsin gubernatorial election

==== United States House of Representatives ====
- 1896 United States House of Representatives elections
- 1896 United States House of Representatives election in California
- 1896 United States House of Representatives election in South Carolina

==== United States mayoral elections ====
- 1896 Los Angeles mayoral election
- 1896 Manchester, New Hampshire, mayoral election
- 1896 Milwaukee mayoral election
- 1896 San Francisco mayoral election

==== United States Senate ====
- 1896 United States Senate elections
- United States Senate election in South Carolina, 1896

==== Other ====
- 1896 New York state election
- 1896 United States presidential election
- Bourbon Democrat

== Australia ==
- 1896 South Australian colonial election

== New Zealand ==
- 1896 New Zealand general election
- 1896 City of Christchurch by-election

== Chile ==
- 1896 Chilean presidential election

== See also ==
- Category:1896 elections
