= 1898 Connecticut lieutenant gubernatorial election =

- November 8, 1898
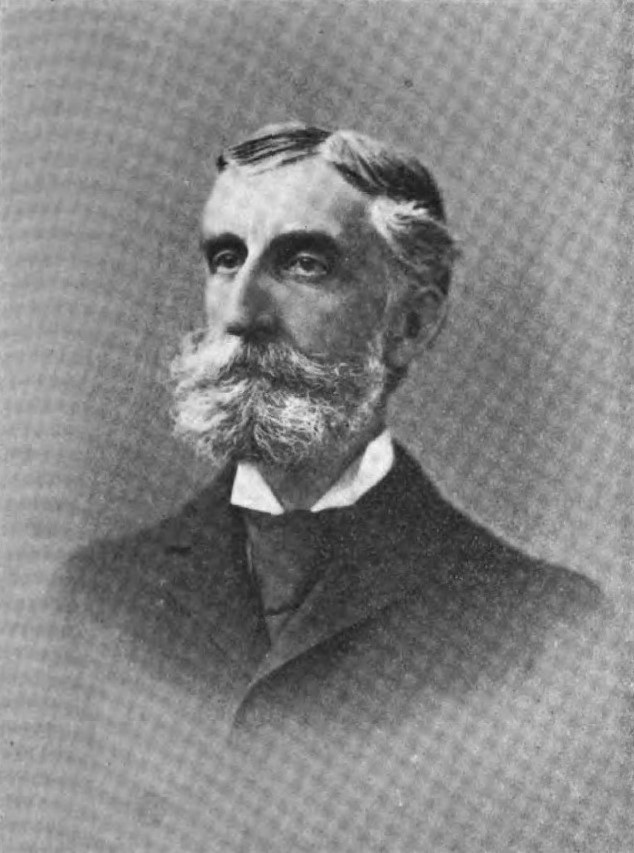

Nominee	Lyman A. Mills	Samuel Bassett
Party	Republican	Democratic
Popular vote	81,254	64,082
Percentage	55.90%	44.10%
Lieutenant Governor before election
James D. Dewell
Republican
Elected Lieutenant Governor
Lyman A. Mills
Republican

The 1898 Connecticut lieutenant gubernatorial election was held on November 8, 1898, to elect the lieutenant governor of Connecticut. Republican nominee and former member of the Connecticut House of Representatives Lyman A. Mills won the election against Democratic nominee Samuel Bassett.

== General election ==
On election day, November 8, 1898, Republican nominee Lyman A. Mills won the election with 55.90% of the vote, thereby retaining Republican control over the office of lieutenant governor. Mills was sworn in as the 68th lieutenant governor of Connecticut on January 4, 1899.

=== Results ===
Connecticut lieutenant gubernatorial election, 1898
Party	Candidate	Votes	%
Republican	Lyman A. Mills	81,254	55.90
Democratic	Samuel Bassett	64,082	44.10
Total votes		145,327	100.00
Republican hold			
