= 1894 Connecticut gubernatorial election =

- November 6, 1894
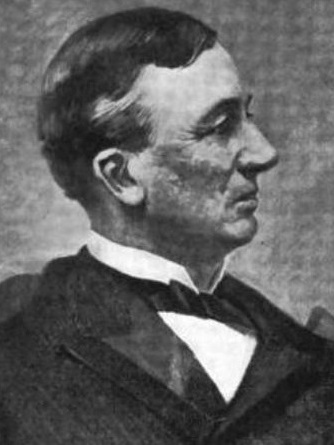

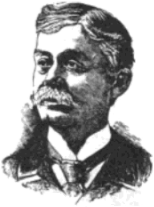
Nominee	Owen Vincent Coffin	Ernest Cady
Party	Republican	Democratic
Popular vote	83,975	66,287
Percentage	54.18%	42.77%
- Coffin: 40–50% 50–60% 60–70% 70–80% 80–90% Cady: 40–50% 50–60% 60–70% 70–80%
Governor before election
Luzon B. Morris
Democratic
Elected Governor
Owen Vincent Coffin
Republican

The 1894 Connecticut gubernatorial election was held on November 6, 1894. Republican nominee Owen Vincent Coffin defeated Democratic nominee Ernest Cady with 54.18% of the vote. Coffin defeated Samuel E. Merwin in the Republican primary.

== General election ==
=== Candidates ===
Major party candidates

- Owen Vincent Coffin, Republican
- Ernest Cady, Democratic

Other candidates

- DeWitt C. Pond, Prohibition
- Edwin C. Bingham, People's
- James F. Tuckey, Socialist Labor

=== Results ===
1894 Connecticut gubernatorial election
Party	Candidate	Votes	%	±%
Republican	Owen Vincent Coffin	83,975	54.18%	
Democratic	Ernest Cady	66,287	42.77%	
Prohibition	DeWitt C. Pond	2,310	1.49%	
Populist	Edwin C. Bingham	1,546	1.00%	
Socialist Labor	James F. Tuckey	849	0.55%	
Majority		17,688		
Turnout				
Republican hold		Swing		
