= 1888 Connecticut lieutenant gubernatorial election =

- November 6, 1888

| Nominee | Samuel E. Merwin | John S. Kirkham |
| Party | Republican | Democratic |
| Popular vote | 75,165 | 74,146 |
| Percentage | 50.30% | 49.70% |
Lieutenant Governor before election
James L. Howard
Republican
Elected Lieutenant Governor
Samuel E. Merwin
Republican

The 1888 Connecticut lieutenant gubernatorial election was held on November 6, 1888, to elect the lieutenant governor of Connecticut. Republican nominee and former Connecticut Adjutant General Samuel E. Merwin won the election against Democratic nominee and incumbent member of the Connecticut Senate John S. Kirkham.

== General election ==
On election day, November 6, 1888, Republican nominee Samuel E. Merwin won the election with 50.30% of the vote, thereby retaining Republican control over the office of lieutenant governor. Merwin was sworn in as the 64th lieutenant governor of Connecticut on January 10, 1889.

=== Results ===
Connecticut lieutenant gubernatorial election, 1888
| Party | Candidate | Votes | % |
|---|---|---|---|
| Republican | Samuel E. Merwin | 75,165 | 50.30 |
| Democratic | John S. Kirkham | 74,146 | 49.70 |
| Total votes | | 149,311 | 100.00 |
| Republican hold | | | |
