= 1896 United States House of Representatives elections in South Carolina =

The 1896 United States House of Representatives elections in South Carolina were held on November 3, 1896, to select seven Representatives for two-year terms from the state of South Carolina. Five Democratic incumbents were re-elected, one Republican incumbent was defeated, and the open seat was retained by the Democrats. The composition of the state delegation after the election was solely Democratic.

== 1st congressional district ==
Incumbent Republican Congressman George W. Murray of the 1st congressional district, in office since 1896, was defeated by Democratic challenger William Elliott.

=== General election results ===
South Carolina's 1st congressional district election results, 1896
Party	Candidate	Votes	%	±%
Democratic	William Elliott	4,652	63.7	+4.6
Reorganized Republican	George W. Murray (incumbent)	2,478	33.9	N/A
Republican	W. Cecil Cohen	173	2.4	N/A
No party	Write-Ins	2	0.0	0.0
Majority		2,174	29.8	+11.6
Turnout		7,305		
Democratic gain from Republican				

== 2nd congressional district ==
Incumbent Democratic Congressman W. Jasper Talbert of the 2nd congressional district, in office since 1893, defeated Republican challenger B.P. Chatfield.

=== General election results ===
South Carolina's 2nd congressional district election results, 1896
Party	Candidate	Votes	%	±%
Democratic	W. Jasper Talbert (incumbent)	7,999	92.4	−7.1
Republican	B.P. Chatfield	635	7.3	+7.3
No party	Write-Ins	21	0.3	−0.2
Majority		7,364	85.1	−13.9
Turnout		8,655		
Democratic hold				

== 3rd congressional district ==
Incumbent Democratic Congressman Asbury Latimer of the 3rd congressional district, in office since 1893, won the Democratic primary and defeated two Republican candidates in the general election.

=== Democratic primary ===
Democratic primary
Candidate	Votes	%
Asbury Latimer	9,136	67.7
William T. Wideman	1,955	14.5
Joseph L. Keitt	1,255	9.3
J.W. Bowden	1,152	8.5

=== General election results ===
South Carolina's 3rd congressional district election results, 1896
Party	Candidate	Votes	%	±%
Democratic	Asbury Latimer (incumbent)	9,746	92.0	+10.7
Republican	A.C. Merreck	659	6.2	N/A
Reorganized Republican	Clarence Gray	192	1.8	N/A
Majority		9,087	85.8	+18.4
Turnout		10,597		
Democratic hold				

== 4th congressional district ==
Incumbent Democratic Congressman Stanyarne Wilson of the 4th congressional district, in office since 1895, won the Democratic primary and defeated two Republican candidates in the general election.

=== Democratic primary ===
Democratic primary
Candidate	Votes	%
Stanyarne Wilson	9,500	62.3
Joseph T. Johnson	5,694	37.3
Hugh L. Farley	63	0.4

=== General election results ===
South Carolina's 4th congressional district election results, 1896
Party	Candidate	Votes	%	±%
Democratic	Stanyarne Wilson (incumbent)	11,230	92.2	+17.1
Republican	P.S. Suber	507	4.2	N/A
Reorganized Republican	D.T. Bounds	443	3.6	N/A
No party	Write-Ins	1	0.0	−0.2
Majority		10,723	88.0	+37.6
Turnout		12,181		
Democratic hold				

== 5th congressional district ==
Incumbent Democratic Congressman Thomas J. Strait of the 5th congressional district, in office since 1893, won the Democratic primary and defeated Republican John F. Jones in the general election.

=== Democratic primary ===
Democratic primary
Candidate	Votes	%
Thomas J. Strait	5,362	46.7
David E. Finley	3,585	31.3
W.D. Trantham	2,520	22.0

Democratic primary runoff
Candidate	Votes	%	±%
Thomas J. Strait	6,291	57.3	+10.6
David E. Finley	4,691	42.7	+11.4

=== General election results ===
South Carolina's 5th congressional district election results, 1896
Party	Candidate	Votes	%	±%
Democratic	Thomas J. Strait (incumbent)	8,511	91.0	+23.4
Republican	John F. Jones	838	9.0	−8.0
Majority		7,673	82.0	+31.4
Turnout		9,349		
Democratic hold				

== 6th congressional district ==
Incumbent Democratic Congressman John L. McLaurin of the 6th congressional district, in office since 1893, defeated two Republican candidates in the general election.

=== General election results ===
South Carolina's 6th congressional district election results, 1896
Party	Candidate	Votes	%	±%
Democratic	John L. McLaurin (incumbent)	9,725	87.7	+10.8
Republican	J.E. Wilson	878	7.9	N/A
Reorganized Republican	George Henry McKie	482	4.3	N/A
No party	Write-Ins	9	0.1	+0.1
Majority		8,847	79.8	+26.0
Turnout		11,094		
Democratic hold				

== 7th congressional district special election ==
The seat for the 7th congressional district was declared vacant by the Republican controlled Congress in 1896. A special election was called to be held simultaneously with the regular election and J. William Stokes defeated two Republican candidates in the election.

=== General election results ===
South Carolina's 7th congressional district special election results, 1896
Party	Candidate	Votes	%	±%
Democratic	J. William Stokes	8,223	88.2	+15.2
Republican	T.B. Johnson	1,068	11.5	N/A
Independent Republican	D.A. Perrin	26	0.3	N/A
No party	Write-Ins	1	0.0	−0.7
Majority		7,155	76.7	+30.0
Turnout		9,318		
Democratic hold				

== 7th congressional district ==
J. William Stokes, the winner of the previous election for the 7th congressional district, defeated Altamount Moses in the Democratic primary and two Republican candidates in the general election.

=== Democratic primary ===
Democratic primary
Candidate	Votes	%
J. William Stokes	3,302	53.6
Altamount Moses	2,855	46.4

=== General election results ===
South Carolina's 7th congressional district election results, 1896
Party	Candidate	Votes	%	±%
Democratic	J. William Stokes	8,065	85.6	−2.6
Republican	T.B. Johnson	1,342	14.2	+2.7
Independent Republican	D.A. Perrin	22	0.2	-0.1
Majority		6,723	71.4	−5.3
Turnout		9,429		
Democratic hold				

== See also ==
- United States House of Representatives elections, 1896
- South Carolina gubernatorial election, 1896
- South Carolina's congressional districts
