= 1892 Connecticut lieutenant gubernatorial election =

- November 8, 1892
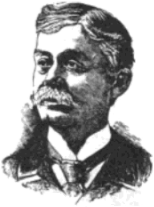

Nominee	Ernest Cady	Frank W. Cheney
Party	Democratic	Republican
Popular vote	82,738	76,637
Percentage	51.90%	48.10%
Lieutenant Governor before election
Samuel E. Merwin
Republican
Elected Lieutenant Governor
Ernest Cady
Democratic

The 1892 Connecticut lieutenant gubernatorial election was held on November 8, 1892, to elect the lieutenant governor of Connecticut. Democratic nominee Ernest Cady won the election against Republican nominee Frank W. Cheney.

== General election ==
On election day, November 8, 1892, Democratic nominee Ernest Cady won the election with 51.90% of the vote, thereby gaining Democratic control over the office of lieutenant governor. Cady was sworn in as the 65th lieutenant governor of Connecticut on January 4, 1893.

=== Results ===
Connecticut lieutenant gubernatorial election, 1892
Party	Candidate	Votes	%
Democratic	Ernest Cady	82,738	51.90
Republican	Frank W. Cheney	76,637	48.10
Total votes		159,375	100.00
Democratic gain from Republican			
