= 1886 Connecticut lieutenant gubernatorial election =

- November 2, 1886

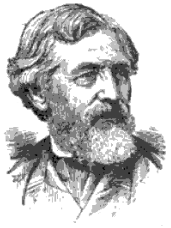
| Nominee | Levi B. Bradley | James L. Howard |
| Party | Democratic | Republican |
| Popular vote | 58,799 | 57,101 |
| Percentage | < 50% | < 50% |
Lieutenant Governor before election
Lorrin A. Cooke
Republican
Elected Lieutenant Governor
James L. Howard
Republican

The 1886 Connecticut lieutenant gubernatorial election was held on November 2, 1886, to elect the lieutenant governor of Connecticut. Democratic nominee Levi B. Bradley received a plurality of the votes against Republican nominee James L. Howard, an unnamed Prohibition and an unnamed Labor nominee. However, since no candidate received a majority in the popular vote, James L. Howard was elected by the Connecticut General Assembly per the Connecticut Charter of 1662.

== General election ==
On election day, November 2, 1886, Democratic nominee Levi B. Bradley won a plurality of the vote by a margin of 1,698 votes against his foremost opponent Republican nominee James L. Howard. However, as no candidate received a majority of the vote, the election was forwarded to the Connecticut General Assembly, who elected James L. Howard, thereby retaining Republican control over the office of lieutenant governor. Howard was sworn in as the 63rd lieutenant governor of Connecticut on January 7, 1887.

=== Results ===
Connecticut lieutenant gubernatorial election, 1886
| Party | Candidate | Votes | % |
|---|---|---|---|
| Republican | James L. Howard | 57,101 | < 50.00 |
| Democratic | Levi B. Bradley | 58,799 | < 50.00 |
| Prohibition | | | |
| Labor | | | |
| Total votes | | | 100.00 |
| Republican hold | | | |
