= Ernest Cady =

65th Lieutenant Governor of Connecticut

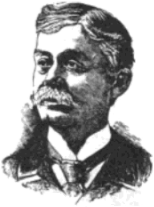

65th Lieutenant Governor of Connecticut
- In office 1893–1895
- Governor: Luzon B. Morris
- Preceded by: Samuel E. Merwin
- Succeeded by: Lorrin A. Cooke

Personal details
- Born: September 6, 1842 Stafford, Connecticut, U.S.
- Died: February 16, 1908 (aged 65) Hartford, Connecticut, U.S.
- Party: Democratic
- Spouse: Ellen Hyde

Military service
- Allegiance: United States
- Branch/service: United States Navy
- Battles/wars: Civil War: • Battle of Mobile Bay

Ernest Cady (September 6, 1842 – February 16, 1908) was an American businessman and politician who served as the 65th lieutenant governor of Connecticut from 1893 to 1895.

== Early life ==
Cady was born on September 6, 1842, in Stafford, Connecticut. He was the second oldest of six children born to Garner Cady, Jr. (1805–1852), who was "killed in his prime by a runaway horse", and Emily (née Greene) Cady (1813–1894).

His maternal grandparents were John Taylor Greene and Eleanor (née Edson) Greene and he was descended from Nicholas Cady, the namesake of Cady Pond, who lived in Watertown, Massachusetts, in 1645.

== Career ==
During the U.S. Civil War, he enlisted in the U.S. Navy and fought in the Battle of Mobile Bay. Following the end of the War, he returned to Connecticut, first Stafford then Hartford, and became a prominent manufacturer and capitalist, as the president of Pratt & Cady Company.

In 1892, he was nominated as the Democratic Lieutenant Governor of Connecticut, winning election in November 1892. Succeeding Republican James L. Howard, Cady served as the 65th Lieutenant Governor of Connecticut under Governor Luzon B. Morris from 1893 to 1895, during which time he presided in the State Senate during the session of 1893 "with dignity and success, winning the admiration and esteem of both parties in the General Assembly." While in office, he was also one of the Water Commissioners in Hartford and was a "controlling spirit" in the Hartford Board of Trade.

In 1894, at the end of his term as Lt. Governor, Cady was nominated as the Democratic nominee for governor of Connecticut to succeed Morris, who would become the only member of the Democratic Party to hold the governorship of Connecticut between 1885 and 1911. He lost the election to the Republican Owen Vincent Coffin and was succeeded as Lt. Governor by Lorrin A. Cooke, who later became Governor after Coffin.

He later served as a Trustee of the Society for Savings, a Director of the National Machine Company, and was on the advisory board of the Board of Education of the Blind. Cady was also a prominent Freemason and a member of the Hartford Club.

== Personal life ==
On January 16, 1871, Cady was married to Ellen E. Hyde (1843–1906). Ellen was the daughter of Hannah Converse (née Young) Hyde and Ephraim H. Hyde, who served as President Pro Tempore of the Connecticut Senate as well as the Lieutenant Governor of Connecticut from 1867 to 1869. Together, they were the parents of two sons:

- Ernest Hyde Cady (1873–1965), a Yale graduate and champion runner who went to London to represent the university and later worked for the Travelers Insurance Company.
- Charles Washburn Cady (1877–1900), who died during his junior year at Yale (class of 1901).

Cady died of heart disease on February 16, 1908, and was found in the bathtub in his home in Hartford, Connecticut. He was buried at Cedar Hill Cemetery in Hartford.

Party political offices
Preceded by Luzon B. Morris	Democratic nominee for Governor of Connecticut; 1894	Succeeded by Joseph B. Sargent
Political offices
Preceded by Samuel E. Merwin	Lieutenant Governor of Connecticut; 1893–1895	Succeeded by Lorrin A. Cooke
