= Lynching of Frazier B. Baker and Julia Baker =

African American man and his infant were lynched in the U.S.

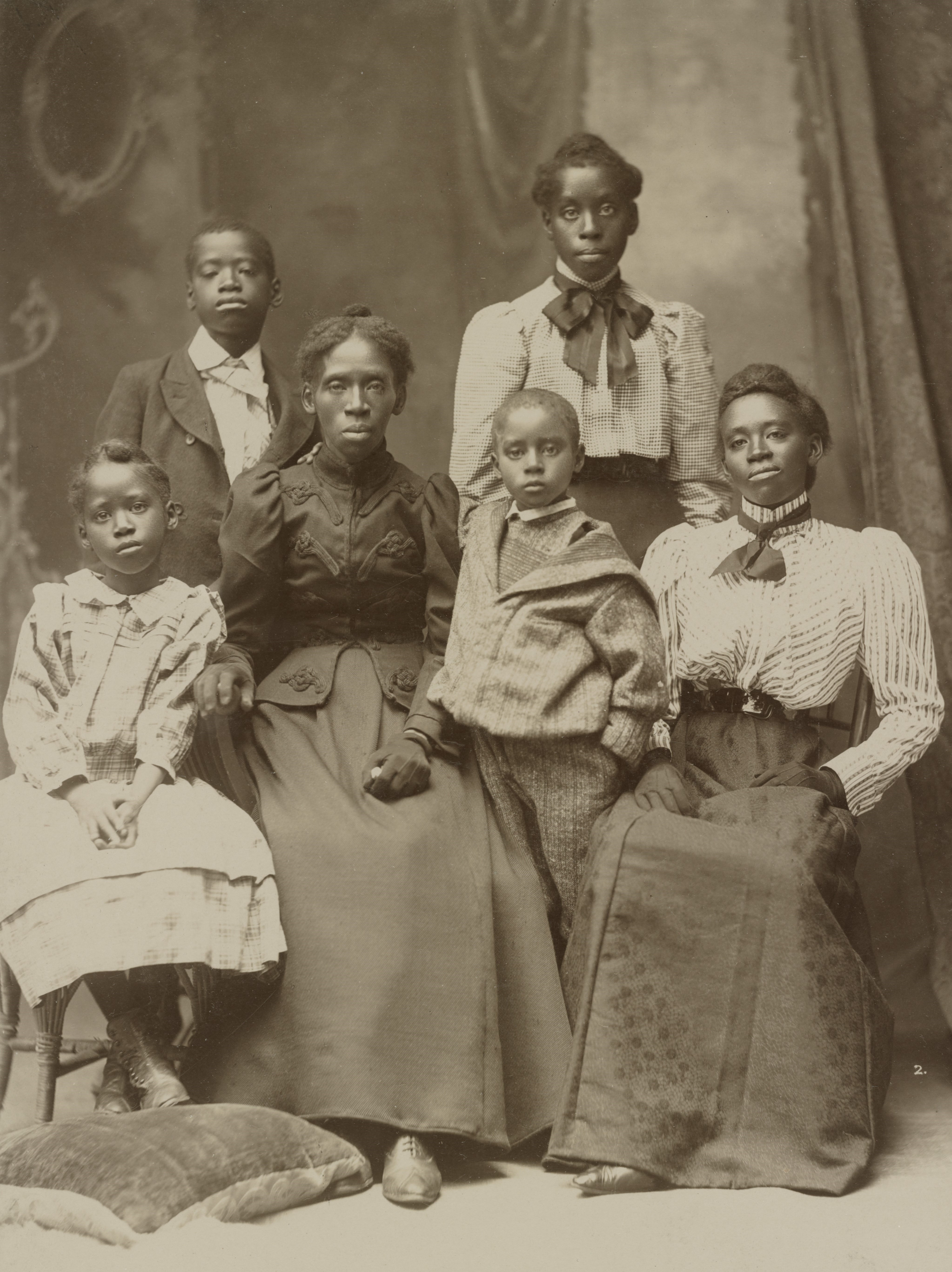
Lavinia Baker and her five surviving children. A mob of whites had set fire to their house at night, and fatally shot and killed her husband Frazier Baker and baby girl Julia on February 22, 1898. Left to right: Sarah; Lincoln, Lavinia; Wille; Cora, Rosa

Frazier B. Baker was an African-American teacher who was appointed as postmaster of Lake City, South Carolina, in 1897 under the William McKinley administration. He and his infant daughter Julia Baker died at his house after being fatally shot during a white mob attack on February 22, 1898. The mob set the house on fire to force the family out. His wife and two of his other five children were wounded, but escaped the burning house and mob, and survived.

Frazier Baker had been appointed postmaster of Lake City in 1897, but local whites objected and had undertaken a campaign to force his removal. When these efforts failed to dislodge Baker, a mob attacked him and his family at night at their house, which also served as the post office.

A grand jury was convened in Williamsburg County but failed to return any indictments. The McKinley administration conducted a robust investigation of the murder, initially offering a $1,500 ($58,050 today) reward for the arrest and conviction of members of the mob. Despite resistance by witnesses to testifying, on 1 July 1898 prosecutors indicted seven men on the charge of murdering Baker. Ultimately, thirteen men were indicted in U.S. Circuit Court on charges of murder, conspiracy to commit murder, assault, and destruction of mail on 7 April 1899, after two men, Joseph P. Newham and Early P. Lee, turned state's evidence in exchange for their charges being dropped. The all-white jury was composed of businessmen from across the state. Newham, the prosecution's star witness, admitted to starting the fire and identified eight of the defendants as having participated in the murders. He expressed no remorse for the death of Baker and his daughter. Another witness, M. B. Springs, identified Henry Stokes as the ringleader; Springs was ostracized in Lake City and was ultimately placed under police protection. Henderson Williams, an African-American witness, testified that he had seen armed white men at the post office on the night of the lynching. He was threatened and fled to Florence after a white business partner threatened to "do [him] like they did Baker." The jury deliberated for around 24 hours before declaring a mistrial; the jury was deadlocked in reaching a verdict, five to five. The case was never retried.

== Background ==
After the 1896 presidential election, the Republican William McKinley administration appointed hundreds of Black people to postmasterships across the Southern United States during his remaining tenure as part of patronage jobs to build local networks. These recess appointments were resisted by local whites, who resented any Black Republican officeholders, and especially appointments made by an outgoing administration. They claimed to fear that the increased political power of Black postmasters would embolden them to proposition white women.

Frazier B. Baker, a married 40-year-old schoolteacher and the father of six children, was appointed postmaster of Lake City, South Carolina, in 1897. He immediately encountered fierce opposition from local white conservative Democrats. While the surrounding Willamsburg County was 63% Black, Lake City was overwhelmingly white, with fewer than a dozen black residents,. Whites initiated a boycott of the Lake City post office and circulated petitions calling for Baker's dismissal.

One complaint was that Baker, a member of the Colored Farmers Alliance, had cut mail delivery from three times a day to one after threats against his life were made. A postal inspector arrived to investigate the complaints and recommended that the post office be closed; in response, a white mob burned it down with the expectation that no one would rent space for use as a post office while Baker remained postmaster. The government obtained space on the outskirts of town, however, a lessening of racial tension led Baker to send for his family in February 1898.

Threats against Baker's life were made as whites remained hostile to his presence. Baker communicated these threats to his superiors in Washington.

== Lynching ==
Victims
Name	Age	Sex	Injuries
Frazier Baker	42	M	Killed by gunfire
Lavinia Baker	37	F	Gunshot to arm
Rosa Baker	18	F	Arm broken by gunshot
Cora Baker	14	F	Shot in right hand
Lincoln Baker	11	M	Shot in abdomen/Broken arm
Sarah Baker	7	F	Unharmed
Millie Baker	5	F	Unharmed
Julia Baker	2	F	Killed by gunfire

At 1:00 am on February 21, 1898, the Baker family awoke to find their house (which also served as the post office) on fire. Frazier Baker attempted to put out the fire without success and sent his son, Lincoln, to find help. As soon as Lincoln opened the door, he was met with gunfire, and Baker pulled him back into the house. Baker cursed the mob and began to pray. As the fire grew, the heat intensified, and Baker turned to his wife, Lavinia, saying that they "might as well die running as standing still," and started for the door. Before he could open the door, a bullet struck and killed his two-year-old daughter, Julia, who Lavinia held. Realizing that his youngest daughter had been killed, Baker threw open the door and was cut down in a hail of gunfire.

Wounded by the same bullet that had killed her daughter, Lavinia rallied her family to escape the burning house, and they ran across the road to hide under shrubbery in an adjacent field. After waiting for the flames and gunfire to subside, Lavinia made her way to a neighbor's home, where she found one daughter waiting. They were later joined by the oldest, Rosa. Rosa had been shot through the right arm and fled the house as an unidentified armed white male pursued her. Only Sarah (age 7) and Millie (age 5) escaped unscathed. The survivors remained in Lake City for three days but received no medical treatment.

== Aftermath ==
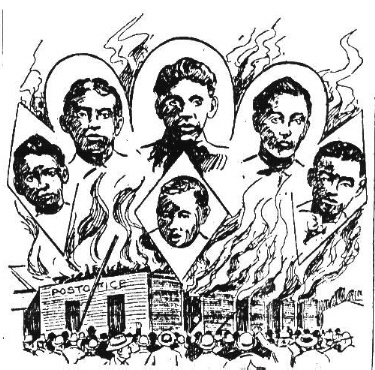
"The Mob at the Lake City Post Office--An Artist's Portrayal," reproduced from the Boston Post, 10 August 1899.

=== Reactions ===
The lynching was met with widespread condemnation, including across the South. The lynching was defended by those who agreed with South Carolina senator Benjamin Tillman, who said the "proud people" of Lake City refused to receive "their mail from a nigger."

Journalist Ida B. Wells-Barnett denounced the lynching and noted that the lynchers had not even pretended that Baker had committed a crime, as mobs often did. At a mass protest in Chicago, she mocked the lynchers as southerners "whose proud boast is their chivalry toward womanhood." To present the resolutions passed at that meeting, she met with President McKinley, arguing that Baker's murder "was a federal matter, pure and simple. He died at his post of duty in defense of his country's honor, as truly as did ever a soldier on the field of battle." McKinley assured her that an investigation was underway. While in Washington, Wells-Barnett also urged Congress to provide support to the survivors. Legislators could not overcome the opposition of the Democrats and nearly Solid South block to authorize such support.

While the lynching of the Bakers had to compete with the sinking of the USS Maine and the escalating tensions between the United States and Spain for the attention of the press, coverage of it was widespread. In South Carolina, white newspapers condemned the murder as "dastardly" and "revolting." The Williamsburg County Record called the lynching "the darkest blot upon South Carolina's history." It said the McKinley administration was also to blame for "thrusting venal negro henchmen into Southern offices of trust."

=== Investigation and trial ===
Lavinia Baker's testimony at trial

I was in the building, with the baby in my arms. [Frazier] saw that I could not move, and he grabbed me, saying, "Come on, we might as well die running as standing." At the door, the baby was shot: the baby was shot out of my arms. I said, "See, the baby's dead." Baker stepped back and saw his dead child; he opened the door and was shot. I followed. Baker fell over and died, leaning against my lap.

— Lavinia Baker, quoted in Fordham 2008

A grand jury was convened in Williamsburg County but failed to return any indictments. The McKinley administration conducted a robust investigation of the murder, initially offering a $1,500 ($58,050 today) reward for the arrest and conviction of members of the mob. Despite resistance by witnesses to testifying, on 1 July 1898 prosecutors indicted seven men on the charge of murdering Baker. Ultimately, thirteen men were indicted in U.S. Circuit Court on charges of murder, conspiracy to commit murder, assault, and destruction of mail on 7 April 1899, after two men, Joseph P. Newham and Early P. Lee, turned state's evidence in exchange for their charges being dropped.

The trial was held in federal court from 10 to 22 April 1899, and the list of defendants was as follows:

- Alonza Rogers
- Charles D. Joyner
- Edwin Rogers
- Ezra McKnight
- Henry Godwin
- Henry Stokes
- Marion Clark
- Martin Ward
- Moultrie Epps
- Oscar Kelly
- W. A. Webster

The all-white jury was composed of businessmen from across the state. Newham, the prosecution's star witness, admitted to starting the fire and identified eight of the defendants as having participated in the murders. He expressed no remorse for the death of Baker and his daughter. Another witness, M. B. Springs, identified Henry Stokes as the ringleader; Springs was ostracized in Lake City and was ultimately placed under police protection. Henderson Williams, an African-American witness, testified that he had seen armed white men at the post office on the night of the lynching. He was threatened and fled to Florence after a white business partner threatened to "do [him] like they did Baker."

The jury deliberated for around 24 hours before declaring a mistrial; the jury was deadlocked in reaching a verdict, five to five. The case was never retried.

Following the mistrial, Lake City whites asked that the post office be reopened and mail service restored. Many African Americans derided this as hypocritical.

=== Baker family ===
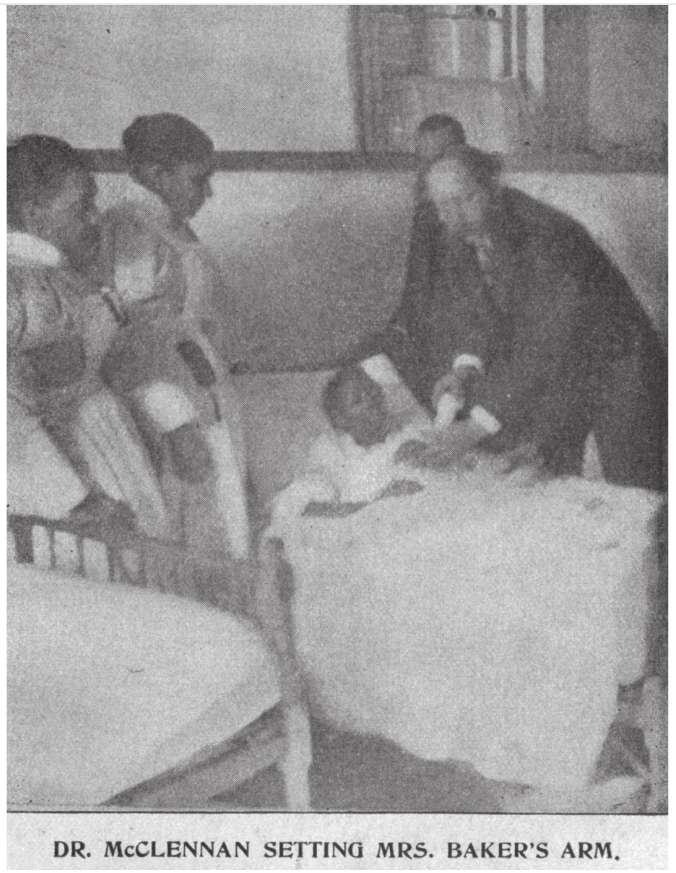
Lavinia Baker is treated by Dr. Alonzo McClennan at the Charleston Colored Hospital.

On 2 May 1898, a mass meeting was held at the Emmanuel AME Church in Charleston, South Carolina, which passed a resolution condemning the attack. The congregation collected $16 ($460.61 today using the same multiplier as above) for the Baker family.

Lavinia Baker and her five surviving children remained in Charleston for several months after the verdict. Lillian Clayton Jewett met with Dr. Alonzo C. McClennan, the Charleston physician chairing a committee charged with the Bakers' welfare, and arranged a meeting with Lavinia. Lavinia agreed to accompany Jewett back to Boston, and she and her children were accompanied there by Jewett and Dr. Lucy Hughes Brown, a colleague of Dr. McClennan. Baker and Jewett had a falling out after several public appearances, as William Lloyd Garrison Jr. led fund-raising efforts to buy a home for the Baker family near Boston.

The Bakers remained in Boston but out of public life. The surviving Baker children fell victim to a tuberculosis epidemic, with four children {William; Sarah; Lincoln, Cora} dying from the disease 1908–1920. Lavinia's last surviving child, Rosa Baker, died in 1942. Having lost all her children, Lavinia Baker returned to Florence County, where she lived until her death in Cartersville, South Carolina, in 1947.

=== Lake City ===
In 1918, the St. James AME Church was constructed on the site of Baker's burned post office and house. On October 5, 1955, the church was burned down. Locals suspected arson by white supremacists angry at the activism of minister Joseph DeLaine during the civil rights movement on behalf of the NAACP. Racists had warned DeLaine that he lived "where the black postmaster was shot to death many years ago."

In 2003, the state General Assembly passed a resolution in favor of installing a South Carolina historical marker about the lynching and house fire. That marker was unveiled in October 2013 on South Church Street, the previous location of the post office and Baker's home.

== See also ==
- Kingstree jail fire
- Minnie M. Cox
- List of unsolved murders before 1900
