= 1896 Connecticut lieutenant gubernatorial election =

- November 3, 1896
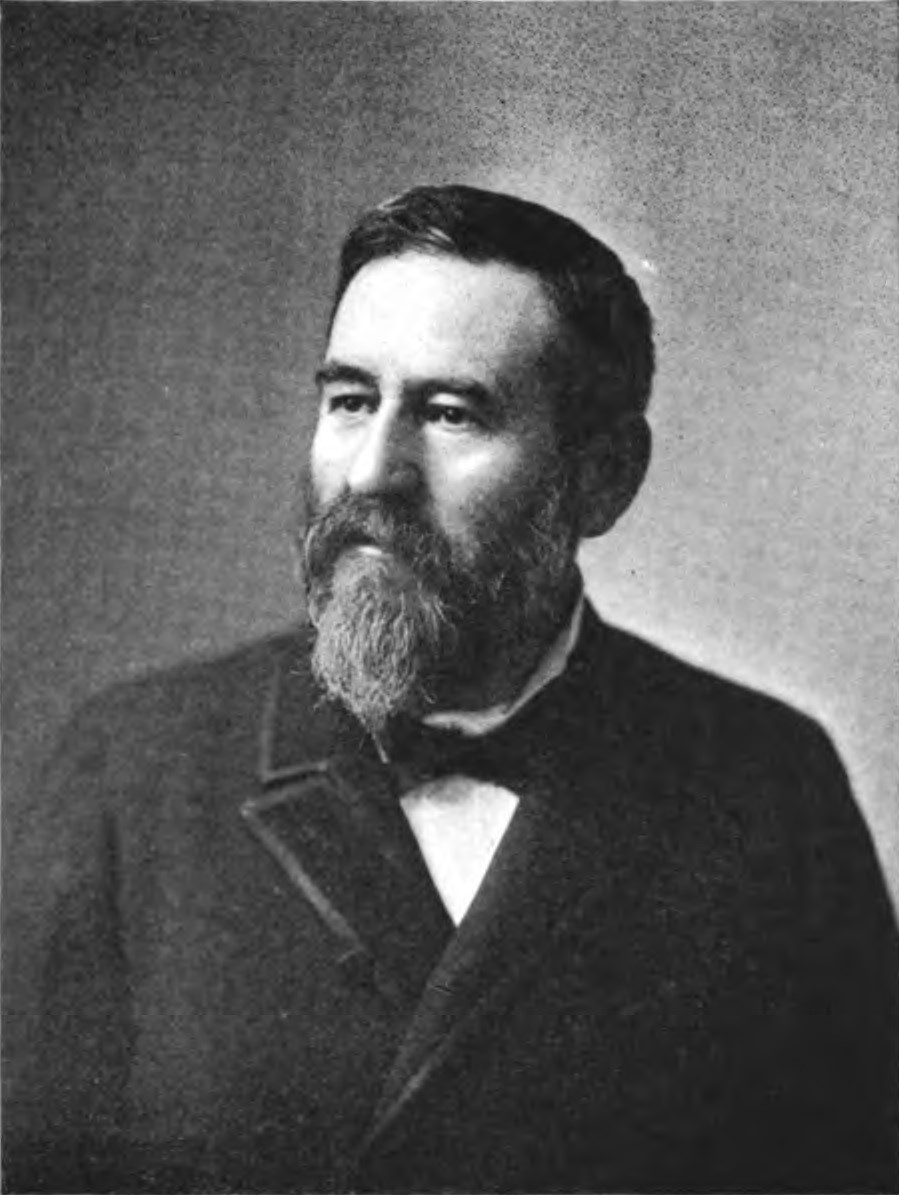

Nominee	James D. Dewell	S. Ashbel Crandall
Party	Republican	Democratic
Popular vote	108,895	56,957
Percentage	65.70%	34.30%
Lieutenant Governor before election
Lorrin A. Cooke
Republican
Elected Lieutenant Governor
James D. Dewell
Republican

The 1896 Connecticut lieutenant gubernatorial election was held on November 3, 1896, to elect the lieutenant governor of Connecticut. Republican nominee James D. Dewell won the election against Democratic nominee and former member of the Connecticut Senate S. Ashbel Crandall.

== General election ==
On election day, November 3, 1896, Republican nominee James D. Dewell won the election with 65.70% of the vote, thereby retaining Republican control over the office of lieutenant governor. Dewell was sworn in as the 67th lieutenant governor of Connecticut on January 6, 1897.

=== Results ===
Connecticut lieutenant gubernatorial election, 1896
Party	Candidate	Votes	%
Republican	James D. Dewell	108,895	65.70
Democratic	S. Ashbel Crandall	56,957	34.30
Total votes		165,852	100.00
Republican hold			
