= 1892 Connecticut gubernatorial election =

- November 8, 1892
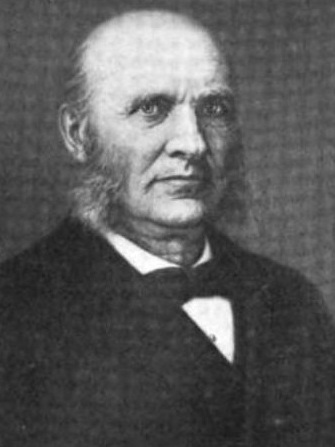

Nominee	Luzon B. Morris	Samuel E. Merwin
Party	Democratic	Republican
Popular vote	82,787	76,745
Percentage	50.31%	46.64%
- Morris: 40–50% 50–60% 60–70% 70–80% Merwin: 40–50% 50–60% 60–70%
Governor before election
Morgan Bulkeley
Republican
Elected Governor
Luzon B. Morris
Democratic

The 1892 Connecticut gubernatorial election was held on November 8, 1892. It was a rematch of the 1890 Connecticut gubernatorial election. Democratic nominee Luzon B. Morris defeated Republican nominee Samuel E. Merwin with 50.31% of the vote.

Unlike the previous election, which resulted in a deadlock and neither candidate inaugurated as governor, Morris's win was not challenged this time, and he was inaugurated governor on January 4, 1893.

== General election ==
=== Candidates ===
Major party candidates

- Luzon B. Morris, Democratic
- Samuel E. Merwin, Republican

Other candidates

- E.P. Angin, Prohibition
- E.M. Ripley, People's
- Moritz E. Ruther, Socialist Labor

=== Results ===
1892 Connecticut gubernatorial election
Party	Candidate	Votes	%	±%
Democratic	Luzon B. Morris	82,787	50.31%	
Republican	Samuel E. Merwin	76,745	46.64%	
Prohibition	E.P. Angin	3,927	2.39%	
Populist	E.M. Ripley	773	0.47%	
Socialist Labor	Moritz E. Ruther	317	0.19%	
Majority		6,042		
Turnout				
Democratic gain from Republican		Swing		
