= 1888 Connecticut gubernatorial election =

- November 6, 1888
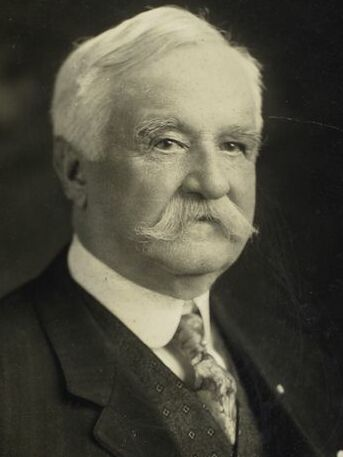

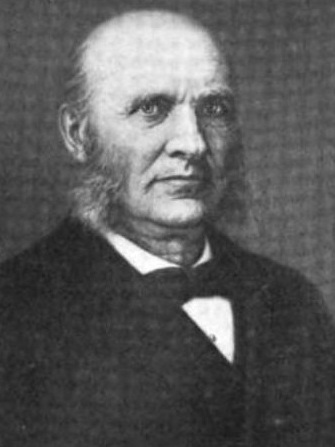
Nominee	Morgan Bulkeley	Luzon B. Morris
Party	Republican	Democratic
Electoral vote	159	95
Popular vote	73,659	75,074
Percentage	47.94%	48.86%
- Bulkeley: 40–50% 50–60% 60–70% 70–80% Morris: 40–50% 50–60% 60–70% 70–80%
Governor before election
Phineas C. Lounsbury
Republican
Elected Governor
Morgan Bulkeley
Republican

The 1888 Connecticut gubernatorial election was held on November 6, 1888. Republican nominee Morgan Bulkeley defeated Democratic nominee Luzon B. Morris with 47.94% of the vote.

This was the third (and last) consecutive gubernatorial election in which the Republican-controlled state legislature elected the candidate who received fewer votes. It was also the last such election to be determined by the state legislature. The law at the time specified that if no candidate received a majority, the state legislature would decide the election. Coincidentally, this election ran concurrent with the US Presidential election, in which Republican nominee Benjamin Harrison was elected president by the Electoral College, despite receiving fewer votes than incumbent Democrat Grover Cleveland.

== General election ==
=== Candidates ===
Major party candidates

- Morgan Bulkeley, Republican
- Luzon B. Morris, Democratic

Other candidates

- Hiram Camp, Prohibition
- F. A. Andrews, Labor

=== Results ===
1888 Connecticut gubernatorial election
Party	Candidate	Votes	%	±%
Democratic	Luzon B. Morris	75,074	48.86%	
Republican	Morgan Bulkeley	73,659	47.94%	
Prohibition	Hiram Camp	4,631	3.01%	
Labor	F. A. Andrews	263	0.17%	
Plurality		1,415		
Turnout				

=== Legislative election ===
As no candidate received a majority of the vote, the Connecticut General Assembly was required to decide the election, both Houses in convention choosing among the top two vote-getters, Bulkeley and Morris. The legislative election was held on January 10, 1889.

Legislative election
Party	Candidate	Votes	%
Republican	Morgan Bulkeley	159	62.6%
Democratic	Luzon B. Morris	95	37.4%
Turnout		254	93.4
Registered electors		272	
Republican hold			
