= 1896 Connecticut gubernatorial election =

- November 3, 1896
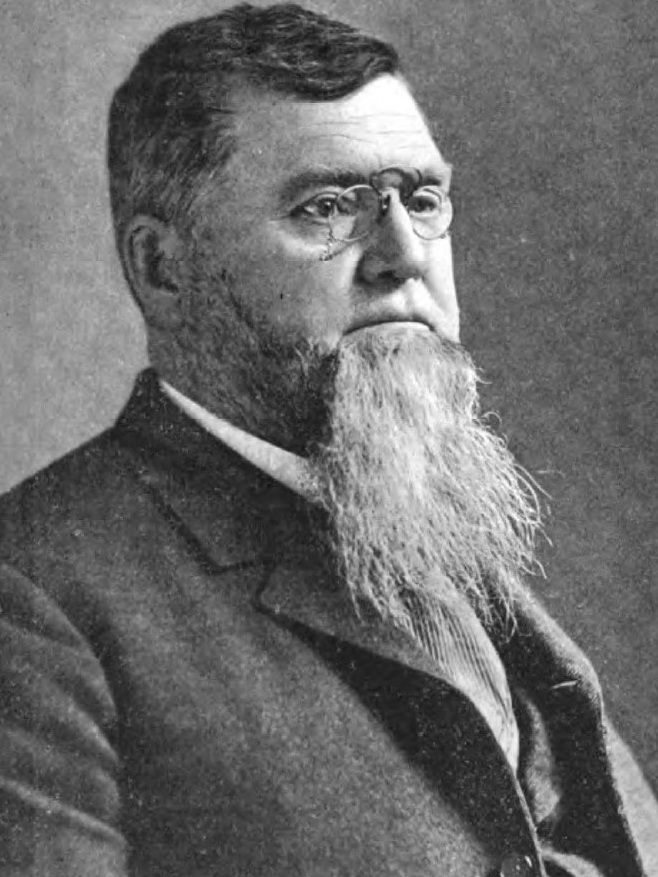

Nominee	Lorrin A. Cooke	Joseph B. Sargent
Party	Republican	Democratic
Popular vote	108,807	56,524
Percentage	62.53%	32.48%
- Cooke: 40–50% 50–60% 60–70% 70–80% 80–90% Sargent: 50–60% 60–70%
Governor before election
Owen Vincent Coffin
Republican
Elected Governor
Lorrin A. Cooke
Republican

The 1896 Connecticut gubernatorial election was held on November 3, 1896. Republican nominee Lorrin A. Cooke defeated Democratic nominee Joseph B. Sargent with 62.53% of the vote.

== General election ==
=== Candidates ===
Major party candidates

- Lorrin A. Cooke, Republican
- Joseph B. Sargent, Democratic

Other candidates

- Joel A. Sperry, National Democratic
- Edward Manchester, Prohibition
- John A. Norton, Socialist Labor

=== Results ===
1896 Connecticut gubernatorial election
Party	Candidate	Votes	%	±%
Republican	Lorrin A. Cooke	108,807	62.53%	
Democratic	Joseph B. Sargent	56,524	32.48%	
National Democratic	Joel A. Sperry	5,579	3.21%	
Prohibition	Edward Manchester	1,846	1.06%	
Socialist Labor	John A. Norton	1,254	0.72%	
Majority		52,283		
Turnout				
Republican hold		Swing		
