= Joseph B. Sargent =

American politician and hardware manufacturer

Joseph Bradford Sargent (December 14, 1822 in Leicester, Massachusetts – July 15, 1907 in New Haven, Connecticut) was the founder of Sargent & Co., a manufacturer of locks and hardware, with headquarters in New Haven, Connecticut, and mayor of that town.

He began his career at age 16 when he left his home in to work for a dry-goods firm in Boston. Hired as an office boy, before long Sargent rose to managing the Boston business. With his brother he moved to Georgia to open a dry-goods concern. It was here that he met and married his first wife Elizabeth Collier Lewis who was from Griffin, Georgia. His second wife was Florence Von Karajan.

From Georgia, Sargent moved his family to Brooklyn where he began work in the hardware field. He was successful, eventually becoming a major stockholder in Peck & Walter Hardware of New Britain. In 1857 he gained control, but several years later, when Sargent attempted to purchase property needed for expansion, he was met with opposition. Exasperated, he moved the entire operation to New Haven which had the advantage of being on a harbor with a train line. He purchased with his brothers, George and Edward, property at Water, Wallace and Hamilton Streets. In May 1864 the plant, now known as Sargent & Co., opened for business.

Sargent's ideas on manufacturing were highly progressive and the new factory was so modern with running water on each floor for washing, manufacturing and fire fighting purposes, adequate bathroom facilities and a slate roof, that many in New Haven predicted the failure of the business before it opened. The plant complex included a building on Water Street that was used for manufacturing and office space. A foundry for grey iron castings ran the entire length of the block on Collins Street, and the brass foundry was located on Wallace Street. A dock on the property was renovated to accommodate coal barges and other large vessels. The old Pavilion Hotel, once a summer resort for families from the South, was renovated to serve as housing for workers and their families. Many of the early workers of Sargent's factory were Italian immigrants that settled in the Wooster Square neighborhood.

Starting with the production of approximately 1,000 items, by 1871 the company was adding extensive additions to the plant to accommodate 2,000 workmen. Using the alphabet to mark each new building, by 1882 the company had reached the letter V. Following the Civil War, Sargent Co. became the largest supplier and distributor of hardware in the U.S., buying out many smaller companies. A major new direction for the company came in 1884 when it began to manufacture locks.

== Mayor of New Haven ==
Sargent was the mayor of New Haven, Connecticut for three terms, serving from 1891 to 1894 and ran an unsuccessful campaign for governor on the Democratic ticket.

Sargent died in 1907 at the age of 83. Although large privately owned manufacturing concerns have all but disappeared in the U.S., the company that bears his name continues to prosper as a manufacturer of architectural hardware for the building trades, now under the flag of Swedish conglomerate Assa Abloy.

Party political offices
Preceded by Ernest Cady	Democratic nominee for Governor of Connecticut; 1896	Succeeded by Daniel N. Morgan
Preceded by Henry F. Peck	Mayors of New Haven, Connecticut; 1891–1894	Succeeded by Albert C. Hendrick
