= 1896 Texas lieutenant gubernatorial election =

- November 3, 1896
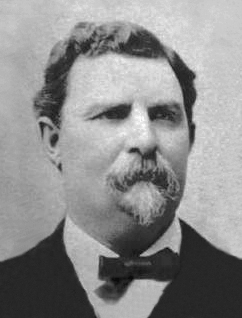

Nominee	George Taylor Jester	H. S. P. Ashby
Party	Democratic	Populist
Popular vote	304,480	231,155
Percentage	56.58%	42.95%
Lieutenant Governor before election
George Taylor Jester
Democratic
Elected Lieutenant Governor
George Taylor Jester
Democratic

The 1896 Texas lieutenant gubernatorial election was held on November 3, 1896 in order to elect the lieutenant governor of Texas. Incumbent Democratic lieutenant governor George Taylor Jester defeated Populist nominee H. S. P. Ashby and Prohibition nominee H. Bradford.

== General election ==
The election coincided with the 1896 presidential election and the issues which dominated the national race affected the statewide race. The monetary debate between bimetalism and the gold standard was the foremost political question facing the country. At the national Democratic party convention, William Jennings Bryan gave his famous "Cross of Gold" speech which led to him securing the nomination and solidifying the Democratic Party's position as being in favor of bimetalism. The policies that Bryan supported closely aligned with those of the national People's Party (Populists) and so at the Populist convention the national party decided on a strategy of electoral fusion with the Democrats and also nominated Bryan as their presidential candidate. In Texas, there was a large faction of "Gold Democrats" which threatened to split the party, but the state party ultimately consolidated endorsing the platform of bimetalism. The state convention renominated all the incumbents for statewide office including lieutenant governor George T. Jester.

The fusion of parties brought about by the Bryan campaign was highly controversial in Texas. At the time the state was a member of the "Solid South" and the Democratic Party had dominated state politics. The Populists had become the main opposition party by critiquing the Democrats handling of public education and land administration while also accusing them of corruption. Several leaders of the state Populists were opposed to the idea of fusion with the Democrats and attempted to defy the national party organization and rally grassroots support for an independent national ticket, but procedural infighting ended the insurgency. A statewide slate was nominated and Harrison "H. S. P." Ashby, one of the voices leading the proposed insurgency, was selected as the candidate for lieutenant governor.

Nationally the Republican Party was surging with their landslide results in the 1894 midterm in which they gained control of Congress by fliping 130 seats, including a seat in Texas. This remains the single largest swing in the history of the House of Representatives. However in Texas, the state Republican Party was fractured and severely diminished. The "Regular" Republicans, which were still controlled by the Black and Tan faction, decided against running a ticket and supported the Populist party. The "Reform" Republicans, also known as the "Lily Whites" due to their opposition to African-American influence in the party, initially ran their own slate of candidates, but after negotiations with the mainline party withdrew their ticket.

On election day, November 3, 1896, incumbent Democratic lieutenant governor George Taylor Jester won re-election by a margin of 73,325 votes against his foremost opponent Populist nominee H. S. P. Ashby, thereby retaining Democratic control over the office of lieutenant governor. Jester was sworn in for his second term on January 19, 1897.

=== Candidates ===
- George Taylor Jester, incumbent lieutenant governor (Democrat)
- Harrison S. P. Ashby, lecturer in the Farmer's Alliance, labor organizer, former preacher (Populist)
- Rev. H. Bradford (Prohibition)
- Robert Hanschke, editior of the German language newspaper Freie Presse Für Texas (Lily White Republican) (withdrawn)

=== Results ===
Texas lieutenant gubernatorial election, 1896
Party	Candidate	Votes	%	±%
Democratic	George Taylor Jester (incumbent)	304,480	56.58	▲6.70
Populist	H. S. P. Ashby	231,155	42.95	▲7.92
Prohibition	H. Bradford	1,726	0.32	▼0.21
Write-in		779	0.15	▲0.03
Total votes		538,140	100.00	
Democratic hold				
