= 1890 Connecticut gubernatorial election =

- November 4, 1890
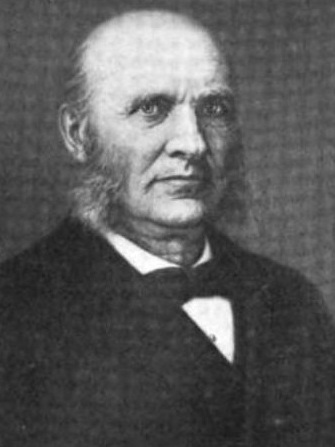

Nominee	Luzon B. Morris	Samuel E. Merwin
Party	Democratic	Republican
Popular vote	67,658	63,975
Percentage	50.01%	47.29%
- Morris: 40–50% 50–60% 60–70% 70–80% Merwin: 40–50% 50–60% 60–70%
Governor before election
Morgan Bulkeley
Republican
Elected Governor
Vacant

The 1890 Connecticut gubernatorial election was held on November 4, 1890. Democratic nominee Luzon B. Morris defeated Republican nominee Samuel E. Merwin with 50.01% of the vote.

The law at the time specified that if no candidate received a majority, the state legislature would decide the election. Morris received 50.01% of the vote, a mere 26 votes more than the majority needed to win. There were irregularities among ballots in Bridgeport as well. The state legislature, having split control, could not agree on a winner, and the result was challenged and deadlocked over the next two years.

Due to these challenges, Morris was not seated as Governor and the incumbent Governor Morgan Bulkeley remained in office, despite not running in the election.

== General election ==
=== Candidates ===
Major party candidates

- Luzon B. Morris, Democratic
- Samuel E. Merwin, Republican

Other candidates

- Phineas M. Augur, Prohibition
- Henry C. Baldwin, Labor

=== Results ===
1890 Connecticut gubernatorial election
Party	Candidate	Votes	%	±%
Democratic	Luzon B. Morris	67,658	50.01%	
Republican	Samuel E. Merwin	63,975	47.29%	
Prohibition	Phineas M. Augur	3,413	2.52%	
Labor	Henry C. Baldwin	209	0.15%	
Majority				
Turnout				
Democratic gain from Republican		Swing		
