= 1896 Los Angeles mayoral election =

- December 7, 1896
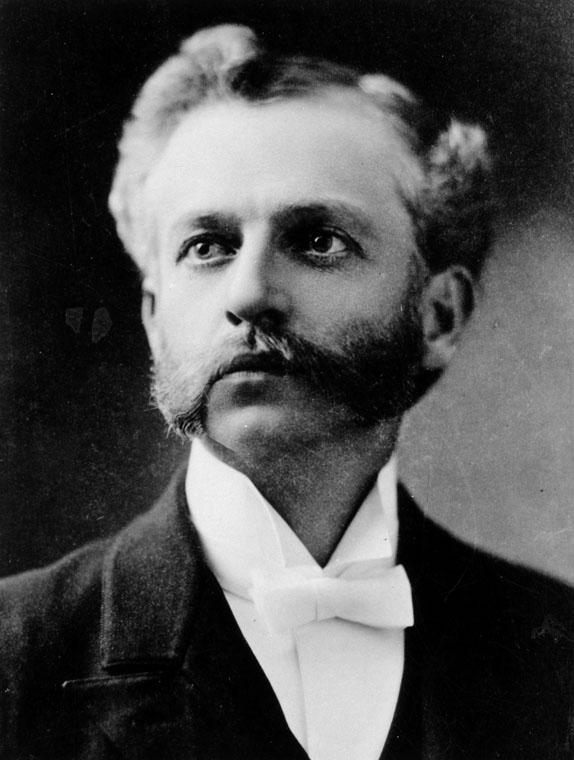

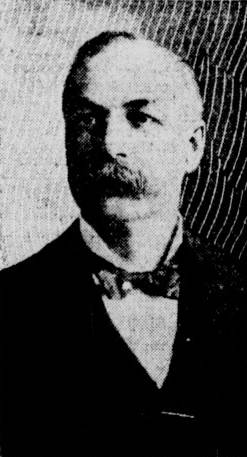
Candidate	Meredith P. Snyder	Julius H. Martin
Party	Democratic	Republican
Popular vote	9,070	7,440
Percentage	54.94%	45.06%
Mayor before election
Frank Rader
Republican
Elected Mayor
Meredith P. Snyder
Democratic

The 1896 Los Angeles mayoral election was held on Monday, December 7. Meredith P. Snyder, a Democrat, was elected.

== Results ==
Los Angeles mayoral general election, December 7, 1896
Party	Candidate	Votes	%	±%
Democratic	Meredith P. Snyder	9,070	54.94%	
Republican	Julius H. Martin	7,440	45.06%	
Total votes		16,510	100.00	
