= George W. Murray =

American politician

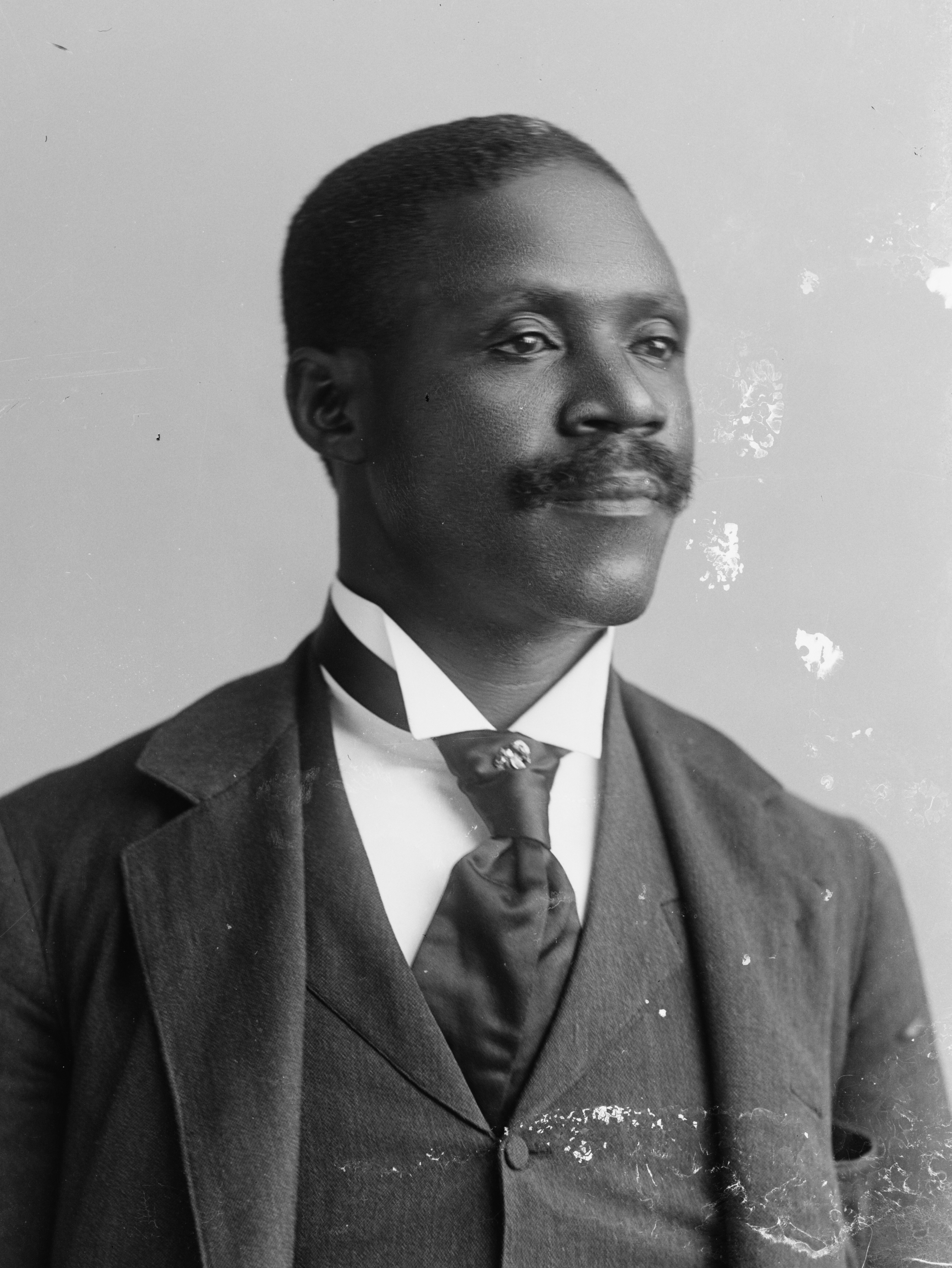
- Portrait by C. M. Bell c. 1894–1897

Member of the U.S. House of Representatives from South Carolina
- In office June 4, 1896 – March 3, 1897
- Preceded by: William Elliott
- Succeeded by: William Elliott
- Constituency: 1st district
- In office March 4, 1893 – March 3, 1895
- Preceded by: William Elliott
- Succeeded by: J. William Stokes
- Constituency: 7th district

Personal details
- Born: George Washington Murray; September 22, 1853 Sumter County, South Carolina
- Died: April 21, 1926 (aged 72) Chicago, Illinois
- Party: Republican
- Spouse: Ella
- Education: University of South Carolina
- Profession: Teacher, politician

George Washington Murray (September 22, 1853 – April 21, 1926) was an American politician, teacher, and farmer. After serving as chairman of the Sumter County Republican Party, Murray was elected in the 1890s as a United States congressman from South Carolina. He was the only black member in the 53rd and 54th Congresses. Because South Carolina passed a constitution in 1895 that effectively disenfranchised blacks and crippled the Republican Party, Murray was the last Republican elected in the state for about 70 years. The next Republican from South Carolina elected to the United States House of Representatives was former Democrat Albert Watson in 1965 while Tim Scott was the next black Republican from South Carolina elected to the United States House of Representatives in 2010.

In 1905, Murray was convicted of forgery in what he said was a discriminatory trial (with an all-white jury) and sentenced to three years' hard labor. He left the state and moved to Chicago. In 1915, he was pardoned in this case by the South Carolina governor, Coleman Blease. In Chicago, Murray again became active in the Republican Party. He lectured on race relations and his political career, and published two collections of his speeches. He died of a stroke on April 21, 1926.

== Early life and education ==
Murray was born into privilege on a cotton plantation near Rembert, Sumter County, South Carolina, in the Piedmont region. His parents' names are not known and he was separated from them by the end of the Civil War. He had two brothers, Prince and Frank. Murray did have formal schooling as a boy.

He worked as a teacher from 1871 until 1874. He entered the University of South Carolina at Columbia in 1874 when it was opened to black students by the Republican-dominated legislature.

With the end of the Reconstruction Era in 1877, the white Democrats retook control of the state legislature. They and the administration closed the college, forcing black students out. That year the legislature also passed a law restricting admission to whites and designating Claflin College for higher education for black students, in order to qualify for funding under the Morrill Land-Grant Act. Murray completed his education at the State Normal Institution at Columbia, a historically black college. Education was an urgent need and a high calling among the freedmen, and Murray taught school for fifteen years in Sumter County. He also invented some agricultural technology.

== Marriage and family ==
Murray married a woman named Ella. They divorced in 1905 after he decided to move to Chicago rather than serve a sentence of hard labor resulting from a discriminatory trial.

== Political career ==
Murray gradually became active in local organizing and politics, playing an important role in the Republican Party in South Carolina in the late 19th century. He was elected as chairman of the Sumter County Republican Party. Murray was a delegate at several Republican National Conventions.

In 1876, white Democrats regained control of the state legislature following violence and election fraud, and they passed laws to impose racial segregation and make voter registration and voting for blacks more difficult. Murray and other black leaders struggled to resist these electoral changes, but in 1882 the legislature passed a requirement for an "eight-box ballot", which made voting even more confusing. White voters were given instructions by white registrars, but black voters were not and had their ballots disqualified. As a result, the percentage of black voter turnout dropped sharply among blacks in Murray's district up to 1890.

Murray became involved with the Republican Party after rising as a leader in organizing for the Colored Farmers Alliance (CFA), a movement to gather political support among black farmers, which started in South Carolina about 1889. Together with the organizing of religious and civic groups, the CFA was part of the rise of Black Populism, and followed the organizing of the Colored Workers Alliance in the state in 1886–1887. Both efforts started with local organizing, with men often meeting secretly late at night, as whites opposed their efforts to gain better wages and improve the electoral system. Due to a roundup of members and interrogation, the CWA was essentially suppressed by Democrats in 1887. White militias patrolled at night to reduce meetings of blacks, but the organizing efforts continued. Murray began to rise as a leader in the CFA and, because of his eloquence, was appointed as a state lecturer.

Under the national Republican administration, Murray was appointed in 1890 as a federal inspector of customs at the port of Charleston, South Carolina, serving to 1892. While white and black Populists struggled to create a third party in the state, Murray gained the Republican nomination from the black "shoestring district" (named for its shape) and was elected to the US Congress in 1892 as Democrats split their vote. He defeated the previous incumbent, Thomas E. Miller, for the Republican nomination. Murray represented South Carolina's 7th congressional district in the Fifty-third Congress (March 4, 1893 - March 3, 1895). He became known as the "Republican Black Eagle" for his speech against a proposed law in 1893 to remove federal inspectors from polling places, in which he recounted his own problems with harassment and discrimination in voting.

Due to redistricting, Murray ran in South Carolina's 1st congressional district in 1894. Although he lost the popular vote to William Elliott, a white Democrat, he successfully contested the election, due to numerous cases of voter fraud in several precincts that discriminated against African American citizens. The case took nearly until the end of the first Congressional session to be decided in his favor, but Murray was seated and served in the Fifty-fourth Congress from June 4, 1896 to March 3, 1897.

He was absent from his seat in part of the second session, as he was trying to combat political troubles in the state. To prevent another Republican-Populist alliance that threatened their control, in 1895-1896, Democratic legislators in South Carolina forced through a new state constitution that effectively disenfranchised African-American citizens, by making changes to residency requirements, requiring literacy tests, poll taxes and a $300 property requirement that Murray and other black South Carolina politicians protested and brought to national attention by publishing the address "To the People of the United States," in July 1896 in the New York World, asking for national support for federal intervention in the South Carolina elections. The constitution was ratified. Virtually no blacks were able to vote in the 1896 election.

In February 1897, Murray returned to Congress as a "lame duck". He wanted to gain a congressional investigation into South Carolina's disenfranchising of its black citizens; he intended to object to South Carolina's retaining nine electoral votes in the 1896 presidential election after excluding so many of its voters (all state electors had voted for the Democratic candidate). He had a petition signed by hundreds of South Carolina Republicans, and asserted that more than 100,000 eligible black voters had been disenfranchised from the 1896 election; therefore, the state should not have retained nine electoral votes. Fearful of potential effects on the apparent victory by the Republican William McKinley as president, Republicans did not want to disrupt the electoral vote count. Murray acceded to their request to drop his objection but continued to call for a federal investigation. Congress adjourned on schedule in March without acting on his request.

At the time, such constitutional changes had survived challenges to the US Supreme Court, which ruled narrowly that, since they applied to all citizens, they were not discriminatory. In practice, however, the provisions were used against black voters. Across the South, states dominated by Democrats passed new constitutions and disenfranchised blacks from 1890 to 1908. Voting by blacks in South Carolina and most other states was reduced almost totally for more than half a century, crippling the Republican Party in the South. Excluded from voting, blacks were also disqualified from serving on juries or running for local office. They lost all formal political power. This situation was not relieved until after passage of federal civil rights legislation in the mid-1960s and enforcement of constitutional rights. The powerful southern Democratic bloc defeated any efforts to change electoral apportionment based on citizens who were able to vote, rather than total populations.

Murray returned to his farm. He invested in land in Sumter County, which he leased for cultivation to black tenant farmers. In 1903, he was charged with forging names on lease agreements in a matter that he said was related to a contract dispute between tenants. He was convicted in 1905 by an all-white jury and sentenced to three years of hard labor. His appeal failed.

== Chicago decades ==
Instead of serving his sentence, which he said was the result of a discriminatory trial, that year Murray moved to Chicago, Illinois. The historian John F. Marszalek agrees with Murray's assessment, describing the trial as "legal whitecapping, a way to rid the community of a troublesome black." As his wife Ella Murray refused to move, she and Murray divorced. He was pardoned in 1915 by South Carolina Governor Coleman Blease, who gave nearly 2,000 men a second chance.

In Chicago, Murray sold life insurance and real estate. In 1908, he married Cornelia Martin, who brought her daughter Gaynell to the marriage. Together in the 1920s, the Murrays adopted a 10-year-old boy, Donald; they also fostered numerous children.

Murray became active in the Illinois Republican Party and an ally of Chicago Mayor "Big Bill" Thompson. During this time, he published two books on race relations, which were collections of speeches he gave across the country.

Murray died in Chicago on April 21, 1926. The eulogy was given by his neighbor John Roy Lynch, who had served as a U.S. representative from Mississippi before that state also disenfranchised blacks in 1890. Murray was buried in Lincoln Cemetery.

== Legacy ==
James E. Clyburn, the current Democratic South Carolina congressman and Assistant Democratic Leader, is a relative of Murray. First elected to Congress in 1992 from the South Carolina's 6th congressional district, a new majority-minority district, Clyburn was the first African American to be elected to Congress from the state since George Murray. Demographic changes, including the Great Migration of blacks out of the state in the first half of the 20th century, had decreased former black majorities in certain counties and congressional districts prior to blacks' regaining the ability to vote.

== Works ==
- Race Ideals: Effects, Cause, and Remedy for the Afro-American Race Troubles, Princeton, Indiana: Smith & Sons Publishing Company, 1914.
- Light in Dark Places (Chicago: Light in Dark Places Pub. Co., 1925).

== See also ==
- List of African-American United States representatives

U.S. House of Representatives
| Preceded by William Elliott | Member of the U.S. House of Representatives from South Carolina's 7th congressional district March 4, 1893 - March 3, 1895 | Succeeded by J. William Stokes |
| Preceded by William Elliott | Member of the U.S. House of Representatives from South Carolina's 1st congressional district June 4, 1896 - March 3, 1897 | Succeeded by William Elliott |
