= Lyman A. Mills =

American politician

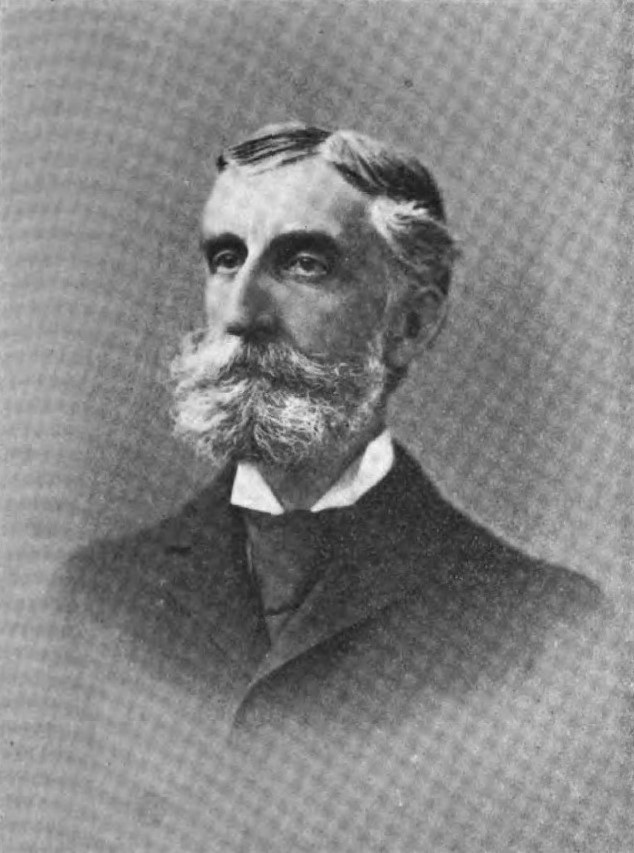
Lyman A. Mills in 1899

Lyman Allen Mills (February 25, 1841 – February 21, 1929) was an American politician who was the 68th Lieutenant Governor of Connecticut from 1899 to 1901.

== Biography ==
Mills was born in Middlefield, Connecticut. He studied at the Durham Academy in Connecticut and the North Bridgewater Academy in Massachusetts. Mills was a businessman and cattle breeder. In 1895, He was a member of the Connecticut House of Representatives and served on the Finance Committee.

Political offices
| Preceded by James D. Dewell | Lieutenant Governor of Connecticut; 1899–1901 | Succeeded by Edwin O. Keeler |
