= Robert Tuttle Morris =

American surgeon and writer

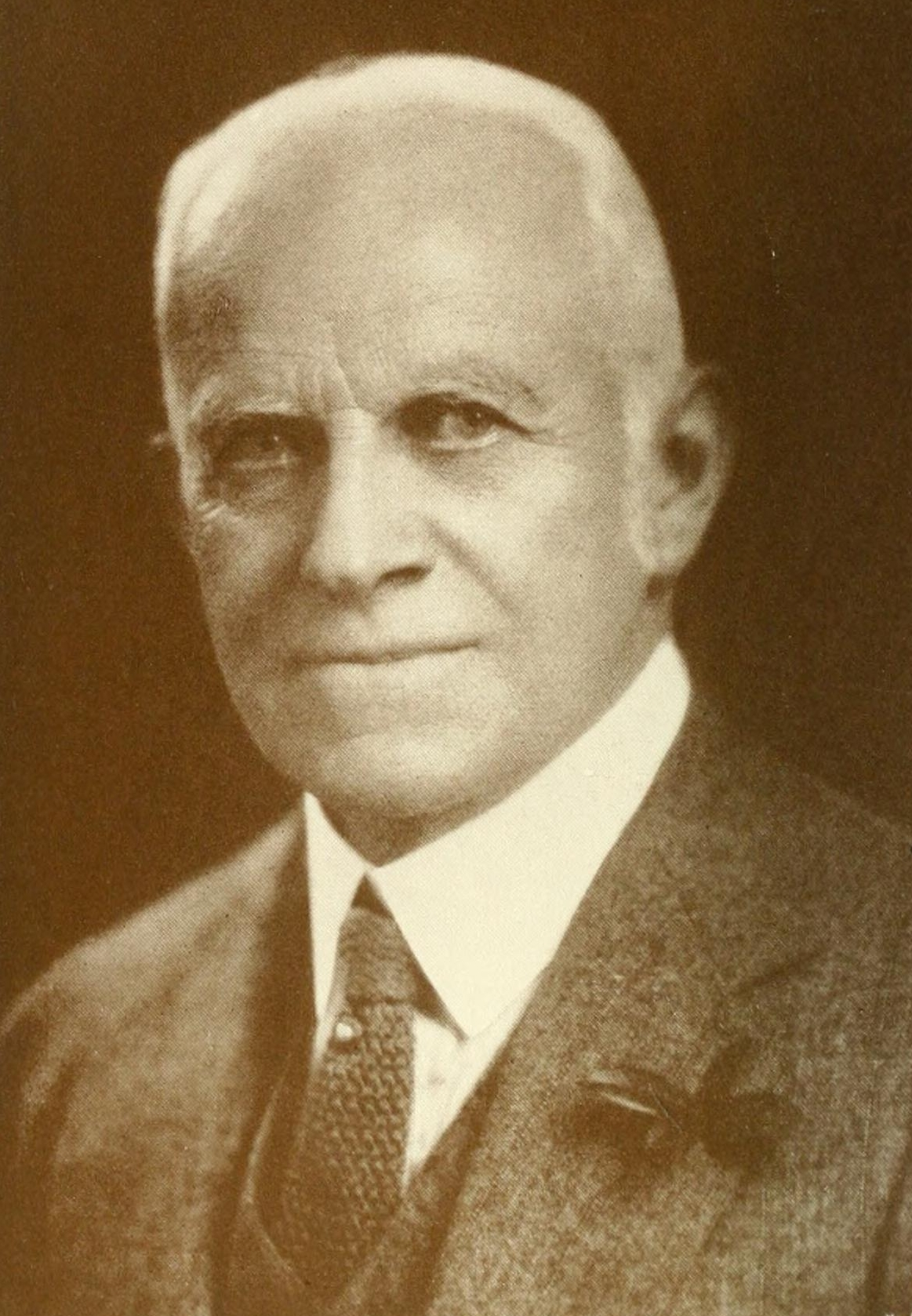
- Born: May 14, 1857; Seymour, Connecticut
- Died: January 9, 1945 (aged 87); Stamford, Connecticut
- Education: Cornell University; College of Physicians and Surgeons of New York
- Occupations: Surgeon, writer
- Spouse: Aimee Reynand Mazergu (m. 1898)

Robert Tuttle Morris (May 14, 1857 – January 9, 1945), also known as Bob Morris, was an American surgeon and writer.

== Life ==
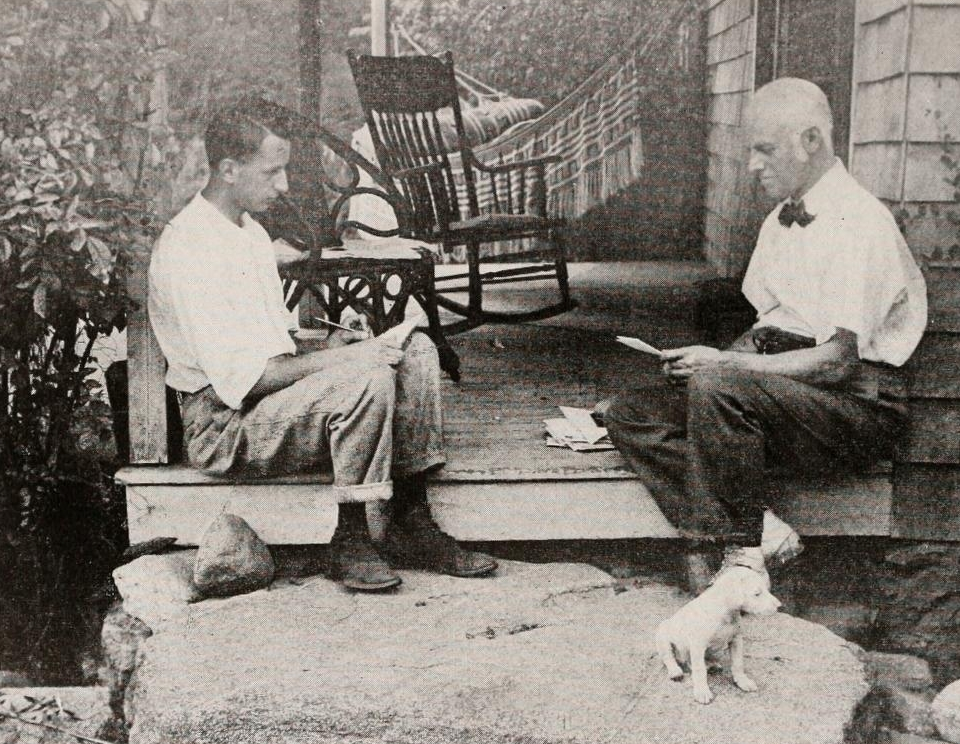
Morris (right) dictating corresponding to his secretary Freer, c. 1910

=== Early life and the call of medicine ===
Robert Tuttle Morris was born in Seymour, Connecticut on May 14, 1857, the eldest of six children. His father was a lawyer, probate judge, and Governor of Connecticut. His mother Eugenia was an author. He attended Hopkins Grammar School in New Haven before studying biology at Cornell University in Ithaca from 1875-1879. As a child he developed an acute interest in nature and animals and continually observed the phenomena of the natural world. While still in high school in New Haven he planned to attend the biology program organised by Dr. Burt G. Wilder at Cornell. This was one of the first pre-medical curricula in the country.

While debating whether to pursue a medical career an incident occurred that helped him to decide. A boy in the nearby town was bitten by a dog that was presumed to be rabid. He was dying of hydrophobia. So he went there to see the boy with Dr. P. C. Gilbert, who was in charge for this case. Thanks to his fine observation skills, he concluded that the boy was stricken with hysteria instead of rabies (which was the most accredited hypothesis). His diagnosis was proven to be correct. Using hypnosis he eventually cured the boy. This experience produced a profound impression on him, and convinced him to continue the pursuit of his medical career.

=== Pursuing studies and travelling ===
In 1879 he worked as assistant with Dr. F. J. and F. H. Whittemore. After that in 1880 he got into the College of Physicians and Surgeons of New York and then graduated in 1882.

Then he went up for examination for position on the Bellevue Hospital staff and he eventually got into the Fourth Surgical Division, so he spent a two-year internship there. At that time the Bellevue Hospital was the largest general hospital in the country.

After his internship he studied in various surgical European clinics. While visiting Europe, he met Lister in London in 1884, and was one of the first to introduce Lister's teachings about surgical hygiene in the United States. Watching Lister at work he noticed how strongly his method was rejected by his British confreres. Then he wrote a little brochure ″How We Treat Wounds Today″ and published it in 1886.

He also had been a delegate to the International Medical Congress in Copenhagen of 1887 and 1890 and he accomplished a visit to various European clinics.

=== Decision to specialize ===
In the end of the 1880s he had decided to make his work wholly surgical. Just around 1890 surgery started to be split up into its various specialties. Before that time, surgery was considered more like a general concept: in those days a surgeon would make everything concerning surgical operations.

The post-graduate Robert was fascinated by surgical experimental work.

Morris was drawn to genitourinary work, influenced by his teachers Dr. Gouley and Dr. Fluhrer. He also developed an interest in neurology and psychiatry, which contributed to his decision to pursue surgery as a specialty.

No one of the laity can realize how much time, pains, mistakes, imagination, mental distress, and money have gone into the making of an experienced surgeon.

The practice of surgery offered various cases that certainly increased Morris' skills, which will lead him to his greatest merits in different medical fields.

=== After internship ===
After internship he settled at first in Albany, then moved to New York and began teaching at the New York Post-Graduate Medical School in 1889. He was given a position as instructor in surgery. This led step by step to a full professorship. He became a professor of surgery in 1898, a position he held until 1917.

In the beginning teaching made him uncomfortable because of his radical attitude on some subjects. His post-graduate teaching lasted for nearly thirty years until the time of retirement. He was asked to teach surgery at Ann Arbor and at the University of Virginia, but he refused. His chief purpose in teaching was to stimulate his students to think.

Morris was a member of most of the national societies. He became a member of the American Association of Obstetricians and Gynecologists in 1890 and its President in 1907; in 1900 he was elected as a member of the Southern Surgical Association and then a senior fellow later on, in 1923. He was also President of the American Therapeutic Association in 1916.

In 1916 he accepted a position as a visiting surgeon to Broad Street Hospital in New York. He decided to continue professional work until he had completed fifty years of unbroken activity.

== Experimental work ==
In the course of his experimental work he had elaborated new techniques and methods, which happened to be useful, and later on adopted by other surgeons. The drainage wick later called the B. M. drain (short for Bob Morris) was his own application of the principle of capillarity in the form of a small wick drain enclosed in a waterproof covering, applied in closing septic wounds. This is now best known as the cigarette drain.

He made some important experiments in cases of apoplexy, suggesting that if a drainage could be promptly established in some of these cases and in cases of sub-arachnoid hemorrhage, the following surgical operation would at times be useful. He also accomplished a number of experiments concerning the practical application of hydrogen peroxide for the cleansing of wounds.

Morris had invented a sort of artificial synovial fluid. Made out by a mixture of boroglyceride, glycerine and normal saline solution, it resulted to be antiseptic and hygroscopic, so that it had a tendency to draw serous fluids towards itself. The consequences of all of its specific characteristics were that when injected into a joint, this fluid resisted absorption longer that an oil could. And these properties were particularly useful in cases of painful joints (especially those one of knee and shoulder).

Furthermore, he made some attempts at anastomosis of blood vessels and a number of experiments to determine if trypsin, pancreatic acid and pepsin would liquefy, in situ, sloughs and coagula that were difficult to remove from cavities. And he actually found out that pepsin acted best and was able to turned blood clot into semi-fluid form. Moreover, pepsin was useful since it would also remove dead bones (after being decalcified with hydrochloric acid), without showing any notable effects upon living bones.

== Antisepsis enters ==
In his book Fifty Years a Surgeon, he gives a clear and complete description of hospital conditions at that time before the entrance of antisepsis in the world of surgery as a normal and necessary routine.

Surgeons today with their sterilized gowns, caps and face masks, ribbed gloves, sterile gauze in place of sponges, and rigid rules against touching an unsterilized object in the room, cannot at all picture the days when such things were new.

So then at some point the Bellevue had to make some changes, due to the fact that Lister theories about the antisepsis had been accepted in the world of medicine. In the Surgical Division an extremely rapid change in method took place, so that the antiseptic surgery had changed the whole appearance of wards in the hospital. Morris was one of the main supporter of the new method enounced by Lister, and later on, of the new theories about asepsis, introduced by Dr. Ernst von Bergmann in 1892.

Soon other discoveries in the field of medicine made techniques to advance. In 1884 Morris was a member of the audience in Berlin when Karl Koller gave his first public demonstration of cocaine as a local anesthetic in eye work. Later on in the United States this experimentation will see his leader in the figure of Dr. William Stewart Halsted. So then anesthetics started to be used regularly during surgical operations.

== Hospitals' growth ==
One of the most astonishing changes remarkable in those days, was for sure the new attitude of the public toward hospitals. Since the day antiseptic surgery was adopted, hospitals became in a certain way recognized. Before that, people had fear to go to the hospital (a reasonable fear, since in certain cases surgical death rate was 79 per cent in one year). Clinics and hospitals grew all over the United States.

Morris was one of the doctors that have promoted the construction of an hospital at Ithaca, the Memorial Hospital, which was finished in 1889 (but the formal opening of the hospital was on January 1, 1892) and later on a college infirmary.

== The fourth era in surgery ==
Robert Morris makes a distinction in his autobiographical book of his idea of the existence of four distinct eras in surgery, one by one characterized by a certain aspect. So he talks about a Heroic Era, then an Anatomic Era, a Pathologic Era and finally a Physiologic Era.

The first one is about all that happened before doctors concentrated their studies upon Anatomy. So it lasts from the time of Hippocrates since the introduction of a rigorous study of the structure of human body. Since then operations were made with brutal rapidity, and there was no regard for antisepsis.

The second era is signed by progress in knowledge and skills, but still surgeons would make unnecessary long incisions for their operations, ignoring the damage they could procure by using this method, making after all the body of the patient in front of a higher risk to get infected.

Then with Lister's and Pasteur's discoveries came the third era, characterized by the consciousness that the microbe had to be considered bigger than the man ("In the First and Second Eras of surgery man was bigger than the microbe; in the Third Era the microbe was bigger than the man"). But still, using Morris' own words, "incisions suitable for killing bears were being applied to weak patients and also surgeons made multiple incisions for purpose of drainage and these also caused shock."

The last one era is based upon the revolutionary and recent idea that the patient, on the whole, is his own best antiseptic. He was a pro of this new point of view, which was contrasted for a long time, since it had come universally accepted. Inspired by an experiment made by Robert Hugh Dawbarn (who was able to demonstrate that the pus originated in an abdominal infection could not be all removed in the course of the surgical operation, by pouring milk into the abdominal cavity of a cadaver and then trying in vain to get it completely out), he started to operate on appendicitis with a new revolutionary method based upon the reduction of shock for the patient, making small incisions, and omitting pads (used for the purpose of protection) and the excessive drainage.

So he made a number of operations of the appendicitis using his own method, and then he was able to present in 1896 at the Academy of Medicine statistics of one hundred consecutive unselected appendicitis cases with a death rate of 2 per cent. His first formal presentation of these principles of the Fourth Era of Surgery (as he named it) was made before the Section of Surgery and Anatomy of A. M. A. and reported in the Transaction of the year. He also presented it at the International Medical Congress in Budapest in September 1909, and published his idea in Surgery, Gynecology and Obstetric for December. And he also published a book, Dawn of the Fourth Era in Surgery in 1910.

Anyway, his results were not completely appreciated by other surgeons, for the appendicitis cases had at that time a high death rate. Some surgeons affirmed that those statistics were not to be taken seriously, since what they proved was impossible. He still improved his methods and skills and he furnished a contribution on abdominal surgery for Sajous' Cyclopedia.

== Merits ==
Morris has a quite impressive list of merits he accomplished during his career as a surgeon. First of all while at the Bellevue Hospital he and Dr. Frase Fuller, a surgeon of another division, had performed the very first cases of wiring of simple fracture of the patella that had been done in the United States, and probably in the world. In those days this type of operation would be considered non-sense and inappropriate, since the idea of opening an uninfected knee joint was unwise, because it would have certainly lead to a disaster, like an infection.

He developed a method for palpation of the appendix and published a report upon the subject.

He made up a method consisting in wound repairing through the agency of a moist blood clot, which became known and adopted in the world over as Schede method. Dr. Max Schede was indeed the one who decided to carry out this method in a number of different cases, after seeing Morris' demonstration, and he finally published a report upon this plan of procedure in the Deutsche Medizinische Wochenschrift, 1886.

Morris made some experimenting with grafting of ovaries in rabbits. In his notes he recorded a frequent trouble in the effort to make one set of rabbits immune to blood serum of another set of rabbits. The main issue was that tissue of any sort taken from one individual and planted in another is physiologically a stranger. The subject of gland grafting engaged his interest in the Nineties. He also noticed that ovarian grafting was so much more frequently possible than testis grafting, first of all because of the number of women donors, which he reported were much more ready than men to sacrifice a solid organ.

He performed the first human ovarian grafting in 1895. and so he published the same year a presentation of his idea of gland grafting, description of technique and a report upon cases. And in May 1906 he published a great report of the birth of a living child after heteroplastic ovarian grafting in the New York Medical Record. After this report, he received tons of letters from women who had lost their ovaries and wished to have a gland grafting. Some of them would offer a contingent fee, condition that Morris had never accepted, since he thought that such a fee would presuppose a work for the money regardless of the rendering of human service.

Moreover, he was one of the founders of the American Society of Endocrinologists. Furthermore, he adopted early intervention for appendicitis in 1890, and wrote about its treatment.

== Curiosities ==
He is known for several aphorisms, such as "The last living thing on earth will most certainly be a microbe." and "No one can be a one-hundred-per-cent doctor until he has himself had some serious illness or surgical operation." Morris told the Cornell Club that World War One was like a Darwinian struggle, but that countries would better recognise the importance of mutual dependence, and he believed that races and hybrids of them depended on "protoplasm" for their success. He also argued that many great writers wrote how they did due to the influence of bacterial toxins on their brains.

== Personal life ==
Morris married Aimee Reynand Mazergue on June 4, 1898.

He died at Stamford Hospital on January 9, 1945.

== Bibliography ==
He was the author of many books, including:

- How We Treat Wounds To-Day (1886)
- Lectures on Appendicitis (1895)
- Hopkin's Pond and Other Sketches (1896)
- Dawn of the Fourth Era of Surgery (1910)
- Microbes and Men (1915)
- A Surgeon's Philosophy (1915)
- Doctors vs. Folks (1915)
- The Way Out of War (1918)
- Nut-Growing (1921)
- Fifty Years. A Surgeon (first printing in January 1935)
- Gosden, Roger G. and Walker, Pam (2013). A Surgeon's Story. The Autobiography of Robert T. Morris. Williamsburg, VA, Jamestowne Bookworks.
