= William Elliott (American politician) =

American politician (1838–1907)

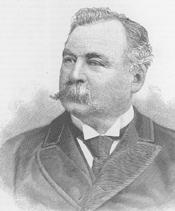

Member of the U.S. House of Representatives from South Carolina
- In office March 4, 1887 – September 23, 1890
- Preceded by: Robert Smalls
- Succeeded by: Thomas E. Miller
- Constituency: 7th district
- In office March 4, 1891 – March 3, 1893
- Preceded by: Thomas E. Miller
- Succeeded by: George W. Murray
- Constituency: 7th district
- In office March 4, 1895 – June 4, 1896
- Preceded by: James F. Izlar
- Succeeded by: George W. Murray
- Constituency: 1st district
- In office March 4, 1897 – March 3, 1903
- Preceded by: George W. Murray
- Succeeded by: George S. Legaré
- Constituency: 1st district

Member of the South Carolina House of Representatives from Beaufort County
- In office September 5, 1866 – December 21, 1866
- Preceded by: Stephen Elliott, Jr.
- Succeeded by: Multi-member district

Personal details
- Born: September 3, 1838 Beaufort, South Carolina
- Died: December 7, 1907 (aged 69) Beaufort, South Carolina
- Resting place: Beaufort, South Carolina
- Party: Democratic
- Education: Beaufort College; Harvard University; University of Virginia
- Profession: lawyer, politician

Military service
- Allegiance: Confederate States of America
- Branch/service: Confederate States Army
- Years of service: 1861–1865
- Rank: Lieutenant Colonel
- Battles/wars: American Civil War

William Elliott (September 3, 1838 – December 7, 1907) was an American attorney and politician, serving as U.S. Representative from South Carolina.

== Biography ==
Born in Beaufort, South Carolina, Elliott attended Beaufort College and Harvard University. He studied law at the University of Virginia at Charlottesville, and was admitted to the bar in Charleston in 1861. Upon the outbreak of the Civil War he entered the Confederate States Army as a lieutenant. He served throughout the war, attaining the rank of lieutenant colonel.

At the close of the war, he returned to Beaufort, where he developed a law practice. Elliott became involved in politics, serving as a member of the State house of representatives in 1866. He served as delegate to the Democratic National Convention in 1876.

He was an unsuccessful Democratic candidate for election in 1884 to the Forty-ninth Congress.

Elliott was elected as a Democrat to the Fiftieth Congress (March 4, 1887 – March 3, 1889) from South Carolina's 7th congressional district, but the election was contested by Thomas E. Miller. An African-American Republican candidate, Miller alleged electoral fraud, which was prevalent in these years as Democrats struggled to retain control of government.

Elliott presented credentials as a Member-elect to the Fifty-first Congress and served from March 4, 1889, until September 23, 1890. Congress determined fraud had taken place, and declared the election won by Thomas E. Miller, who took his seat in late 1890.

Elliott was elected to the Fifty-second Congress (March 4, 1891 – March 3, 1893). He was not a candidate in 1892.

Due to redistricting by the state legislature, Elliott ran in 1894 from South Carolina's 1st congressional district, a black-majority district. He won, but the election was contested by the Republican candidate George W. Murray, an African-American attorney who alleged widespread cases of fraud in the precincts. Elliott presented credentials as a Member-elect to the Fifty-fourth Congress and served from March 4, 1895, until June 4, 1896. Murray presented extensive documentation to Congress of his complaint, and it determined the contested election in Murray's favor; he was seated at the end of the first session.

Over the objections of its black voters and politicians, in 1896 South Carolina ratified a new constitution that effectively disfranchised nearly all black citizens as voters. The Republican Party ceased to be competitive in the state. From 1890 to 1908 all states of the former Confederacy passed similar constitutions to disfranchise blacks and many poor whites; the Democrats ruled a one-party region and gained great power in the US Congress by controlling all the region's apportionment although many of its citizens had been excluded from politics.

The one-party state was dominated for decades by Democrats, so the important contests took place in the primaries. Elliott was elected to the Fifty-fifth, Fifty-sixth and Fifty-seventh Congresses (March 4, 1897 – March 3, 1903).

He was not a candidate for renomination in 1902. He ran unsuccessfully that year to gain legislative election to the United States Senate.

In 1906 Elliott was appointed by President Theodore Roosevelt as commissioner of the United States to identify and mark the graves of Confederate dead in the North. He directed the operations of this group until his death in Beaufort, South Carolina, on December 7, 1907. He was interred in St. Helena Churchyard.

== Sources ==
- United States Congress. "William Elliott (id: E000129)". Biographical Directory of the United States Congress.

U.S. House of Representatives
Preceded by Robert Smalls	Member of the U.S. House of Representatives from South Carolina's 7th congressional district 1887-1890	Succeeded by Thomas E. Miller
Preceded by Thomas E. Miller	Member of the U.S. House of Representatives from South Carolina's 7th congressional district 1891-1893	Succeeded by George W. Murray
Preceded by James F. Izlar	Member of the U.S. House of Representatives from South Carolina's 1st congressional district 1895-1896	Succeeded by George W. Murray
Preceded by George W. Murray	Member of the U.S. House of Representatives from South Carolina's 1st congressional district 1897-1903	Succeeded by George S. Legaré
