= J. William Stokes =

American politician

James William Stokes
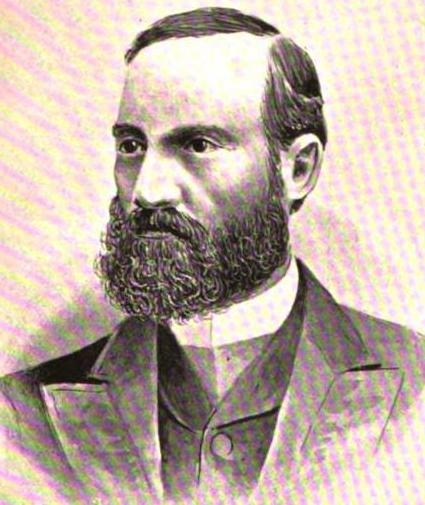

Member of the U.S. House of Representatives from South Carolina's 7th district
- In office November 3, 1896 – July 6, 1901
- Preceded by: Himself
- Succeeded by: Asbury F. Lever
- In office March 4, 1895 – June 1, 1896
- Preceded by: George W. Murray
- Succeeded by: Himself

Member of South Carolina Senate
- In office 1890

Personal details
- Born: December 12, 1853 Orangeburg, South Carolina
- Died: July 6, 1901 (aged 47) Orangeburg, South Carolina
- Party: Democratic
- Education: Washington and Lee University; Vanderbilt University
- Profession: teacher, farmer

James William Stokes (December 12, 1853 – July 6, 1901) was a U.S. representative from South Carolina.

Born near Orangeburg, South Carolina, Stokes attended the common schools and was graduated from Washington and Lee University, Lexington, Virginia, in 1876. He taught school for 12 years.

He was graduated in medicine from Vanderbilt University, Nashville, Tennessee. He engaged in agricultural pursuits in 1889. He served as president of the State Farmers' Alliance.

He served as member of the South Carolina Senate in 1890. He served as delegate to the Democratic National Convention in 1892.

He was defeated by the African-American George W. Murray for election in 1892 to the Fifty-third Congress, but was successful in the 1894 election. He presented credentials as a Democratic Member-elect to the Fifty-fourth Congress and served from March 4, 1895, to June 1, 1896, when the seat was declared vacant.

Stokes was elected as Democrat in a special election to fill the vacancy thus caused. In 1895, South Carolina ratified a new constitution that disfranchised black voters. It became a one-party, Democratic state, with contests settled in the primaries. This situation continued until passage of federal civil rights legislation in the 1960s.

Stokes was re-elected as a Democrat to the Fifty-fifth, Fifty-sixth and Fifty-seventh Congresses and served from November 3, 1896, until his death in Orangeburg, South Carolina, July 6, 1901. He was interred in Sunnyside Cemetery.

== See also ==
- List of members of the United States Congress who died in office (1900–1949)

== Sources ==
- United States Congress. "J. William Stokes (id: S000947)". Biographical Directory of the United States Congress.
- Memorial addresses on the life and character of J. William Stokes, late a representative from South Carolina delivered in the House of Representatives and Senate frontispiece 1902

U.S. House of Representatives
Preceded by George W. Murray	Member of the U.S. House of Representatives from South Carolina's 7th congressional district 1895–1901	Succeeded by Asbury F. Lever
