= Luzon B. Morris =

American politician

Luzon Buritt Morris
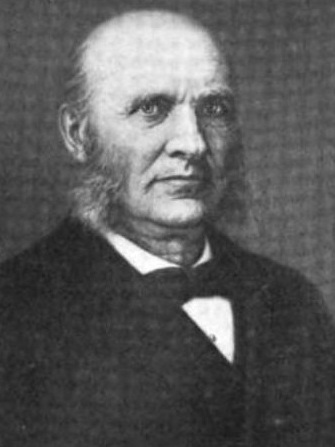

55th Governor of Connecticut
- In office January 4, 1893 – January 9, 1895
- Lieutenant: Ernest Cady
- Preceded by: Morgan Bulkeley
- Succeeded by: Owen Vincent Coffin

Member of the Connecticut House of Representatives
- In office 1880-1881; 1876; 1870; 1855–1856

Personal details
- Born: April 16, 1827 Newtown, Connecticut
- Died: August 22, 1895 (aged 68) Newtown, Connecticut
- Party: Democratic Party
- Spouse: Eugenia L. Tuttle Morris
- Children: 6, including Robert Tuttle Morris
- Education: Yale University
- Profession: Lawyer, Politician

Luzon Buritt Morris (April 16, 1827 – August 22, 1895) was an American lawyer and politician from Connecticut. He served as the 55th governor of Connecticut.

== Biography ==
Morris was born in Newtown, Connecticut. He prepared for college at the Connecticut Literary Institute in Suffield, Connecticut and worked as a blacksmith and in a factory until he entered Yale University. He studied law with a local attorney while attending Yale, graduating in 1854, and attaining admission to the bar in 1856. While at Yale he became a member of Skull and Bones.

Morris served in the Connecticut House of Representatives from 1855 until 1856, 1870, 1876, 1880 and in 1881. He was probate judge from 1857 until 1863, and served in the Connecticut Senate in 1874. He served as President pro tempore of the Connecticut Senate. During his service in the Connecticut General Assembly, he was a member of the commission that settled the border dispute with New York. He was an officer of the Connecticut Savings Bank for several years, and served as the bank president.

As governor of Connecticut from January 4, 1893 until January 9, 1895, Morris was the only member of the Democratic Party to hold the governorship between 1885 and 1911. During his governorship, Morris advocated for constitutional amendments in the election laws, but failed to get the appropriate legislation passed. His popularity eroded due to the bleak financial depression that overwhelmed the state, and he did not seek reelection. After leaving office, Morris returned to his law practice.

== Personal life ==
Morris married Eugenia L. Tuttle in 1856. They had six children together including Mary Seamoor Morris Pratt, Helen Harrison Morris Hadley, Ray Morris and Robert Tuttle Morris.

His daughter Mary married oil industrialist Charles Millard Pratt, and they had five children. His daughter Helen married Yale University president Arthur Twining Hadley, and they had three children. His son Ray was a partner in the investment banking house of Brown Brothers Harriman. His son, Dr. Robert Tuttle Morris, became a famous surgeon and author.

== Death and legacy ==
Morris died of a stroke at his home in New Haven, Connecticut on August 22, 1895. He is interred at the Zoar Cemetery in Newtown, Connecticut. His home in New Haven was purchased by Yale University in 1957 and restored in 1990. The house was originally built in 1873 and features Italianate architecture.

== See also ==
- 1888 Connecticut gubernatorial election
- 1890 Connecticut gubernatorial election
- 1892 Connecticut gubernatorial election

Party political offices
Preceded by Edward S. Cleveland	Democratic nominee for Governor of Connecticut; 1888, 1890, 1892	Succeeded by Ernest Cady
Political offices
Preceded by Morgan G. Bulkeley	Governor of Connecticut; 1893–1895	Succeeded by O. Vincent Coffin
