= 1896 Wisconsin lieutenant gubernatorial election =

- November 3, 1896
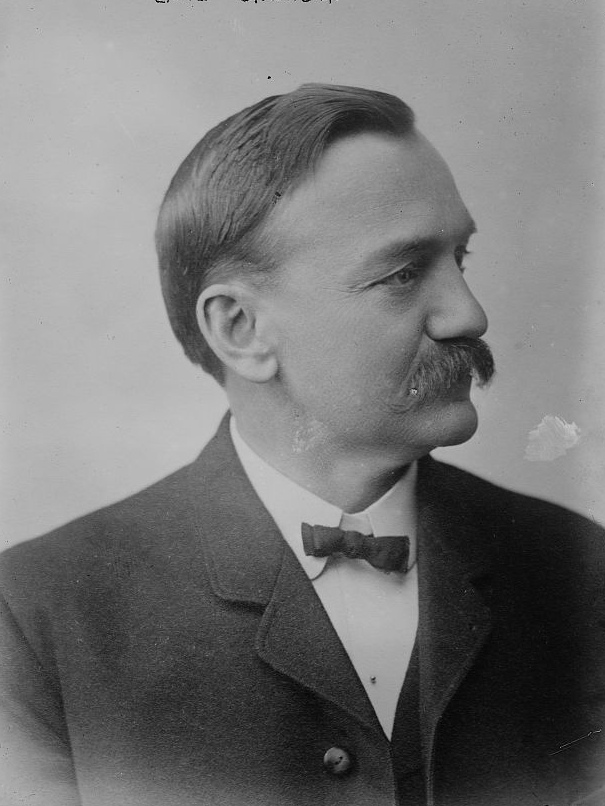

Nominee	Emil Baensch	Horatio H. Hoard
Party	Republican	Democratic
Popular vote	265,704	167,640
Percentage	60.01%	37.86%
Lieutenant Governor before election
Emil Baensch
Republican
Elected Lieutenant Governor
Emil Baensch
Republican

The 1896 Wisconsin lieutenant gubernatorial election was held on November 3, 1896, in order to elect the lieutenant governor of Wisconsin. Incumbent Republican lieutenant governor Emil Baensch defeated Democratic nominee Horatio H. Hoard, Prohibition nominee Ephraim Llewellyn Eaton and Socialist Labor nominee Henry Reese.

== General election ==
On election day, November 3, 1896, incumbent Republican lieutenant governor Emil Baensch won re-election by a margin of 98,064 votes against his foremost opponent Democratic nominee Horatio H. Hoard, thereby retaining Republican control over the office of lieutenant governor. Baensch was sworn in for his second term on January 4, 1897.

=== Results ===
Wisconsin lieutenant gubernatorial election, 1896
Party	Candidate	Votes	%
Republican	Emil Baensch (incumbent)	265,704	60.01
Democratic	Horatio H. Hoard	167,640	37.86
Prohibition	Ephraim Llewellyn Eaton	8,123	1.83
Socialist Labor	Henry Reese	1,299	0.29
	Scattering	4	0.01
Total votes		442,770	100.00
Republican hold			
