= 1896 Missouri lieutenant gubernatorial election =

- November 3, 1896
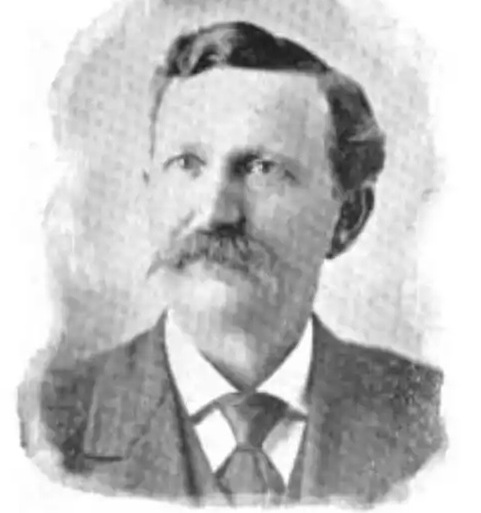

Nominee	August Bolte	Abraham C. Pettijohn
Party	Democratic	Republican
Popular vote	340,974	304,624
Percentage	50.56%	45.17%
- County results Bolte: 40–50% 50–60% 60–70% 70–80% 80–90% Pettijohn: 40–50% 50–60% 60–70% 70–80%
Lieutenant Governor before election
John Baptiste O'Meara
Democratic
Elected Lieutenant Governor
August Bolte
Democratic

The 1896 Missouri lieutenant gubernatorial election was held on November 3, 1896, in order to elect the lieutenant governor of Missouri. Democratic nominee August Bolte defeated Republican nominee Abraham C. Pettijohn, People's nominee J. H. Hillis, Prohibition nominee James M. Richey, National Democratic nominee Alfred F. Osterman and Socialist Labor nominee Christopher Rocker.

== General election ==
On election day, November 3, 1896, Democratic nominee August Bolte won the election by a margin of 36,350 votes against his foremost opponent Republican nominee Abraham C. Pettijohn, thereby retaining Democratic control over the office of lieutenant governor. Bolte was sworn in as the 23rd lieutenant governor of Missouri on January 11, 1897.

=== Results ===
Missouri lieutenant gubernatorial election, 1896
Party	Candidate	Votes	%
Democratic	August Bolte	340,974	50.56
Republican	Abraham C. Pettijohn	304,624	45.17
Populist	J. H. Hillis	23,824	3.53
Prohibition	James M. Richey	2,341	0.35
National Democratic	Alfred F. Osterman	1,955	0.29
Socialist Labor	Christopher Rocker	634	0.10
Total votes		674,352	100.00
Democratic hold			

== See also ==
- 1896 Missouri gubernatorial election
