= Samuel E. Merwin =

American politician

64th Lieutenant Governor of Connecticut
- In office 1889–1893
- Governor: Morgan Bulkeley
- Preceded by: James L. Howard
- Succeeded by: Ernest Cady

Connecticut Adjutant General
- In office 1871–1872
- Preceded by: Colin M. Ingersoll
- Succeeded by: William P. Trowbridge
- In office 1869–1870
- Preceded by: Colin M. Ingersoll
- Succeeded by: Colin M. Ingersoll

Personal details
- Born: August 31, 1831 Brookfield, Connecticut, U.S.
- Died: March 5, 1907 (aged 75) New Haven, Connecticut, U.S.
- Party: Republican

Military service
- Allegiance: United States
- Branch/service: United States Army
- Battles/wars: Civil War

Samuel Edwin Merwin (August 31, 1831 – March 5, 1907), was an American politician who was the 64th lieutenant governor of Connecticut from 1889 to 1893.

== Early life ==
Merwin was born in Brookfield, Connecticut on August 31, 1831, the son of Samuel Edwin Merwin Sr. and Ruby (née Nearing) Merwin.

== Career ==
He received his early education in the district school and then from a private tutor. By the age of 16, he moved to New Haven. He served as a clerk in a store for three years, then went into business with his father. Later, he became president of the New Haven and Yale National Banks. He was a commanding officer of a company known as the "New Haven Grays" in the U.S. Army during the U.S. Civil War.

=== Political career ===
In 1872, Merwin became a member of the Connecticut State Senate for the 4th district, as the first Republican ever from that district He was a delegate to the Republican National Convention from Connecticut in 1884. He was elected Lieutenant Governor of Connecticut in November 1888, and served from January 10, 1889, while Morgan Bulkeley was the governor. In the election of 1890, Merwin defeated Bulkeley for the Republican nomination for candidate in the gubernatorial election. His opponent received a majority of fewer than 100 votes, and the election was contested. There was a deadlock for two years, until the next election, in which Bulkeley still served as governor. Merwin continued serving as lieutenant governor during those years.

Merwin was the Republican candidate for governor in the election of 1892 as well, and aspired to become the candidate in 1894 too. However, in 1892, the gubernatorial election was won by Democrat Luzon Buritt Morris, and in 1894, Owen Vincent Coffin was the Republican candidate and won the election.

== Personal life ==
Merwin died at his residence in New Haven, Connecticut on March 5, 1907, after an illness of three years.

Party political offices
Preceded by Morgan Bulkeley	Republican nominee for Governor of Connecticut; 1890, 1892	Succeeded by Owen Vincent Coffin
Military offices
Preceded by Colin M. Ingersoll	Connecticut Adjutant General; 1869–1870	Succeeded by Colin M. Ingersoll
Preceded by Colin M. Ingersoll	Connecticut Adjutant General; 1871–1872	Succeeded by William P. Trowbridge
Political offices
Preceded by James L. Howard	Lieutenant Governor of Connecticut; 1889–1893	Succeeded by Ernest Cady
