= James D. Dewell =

American politician (1837–1906)

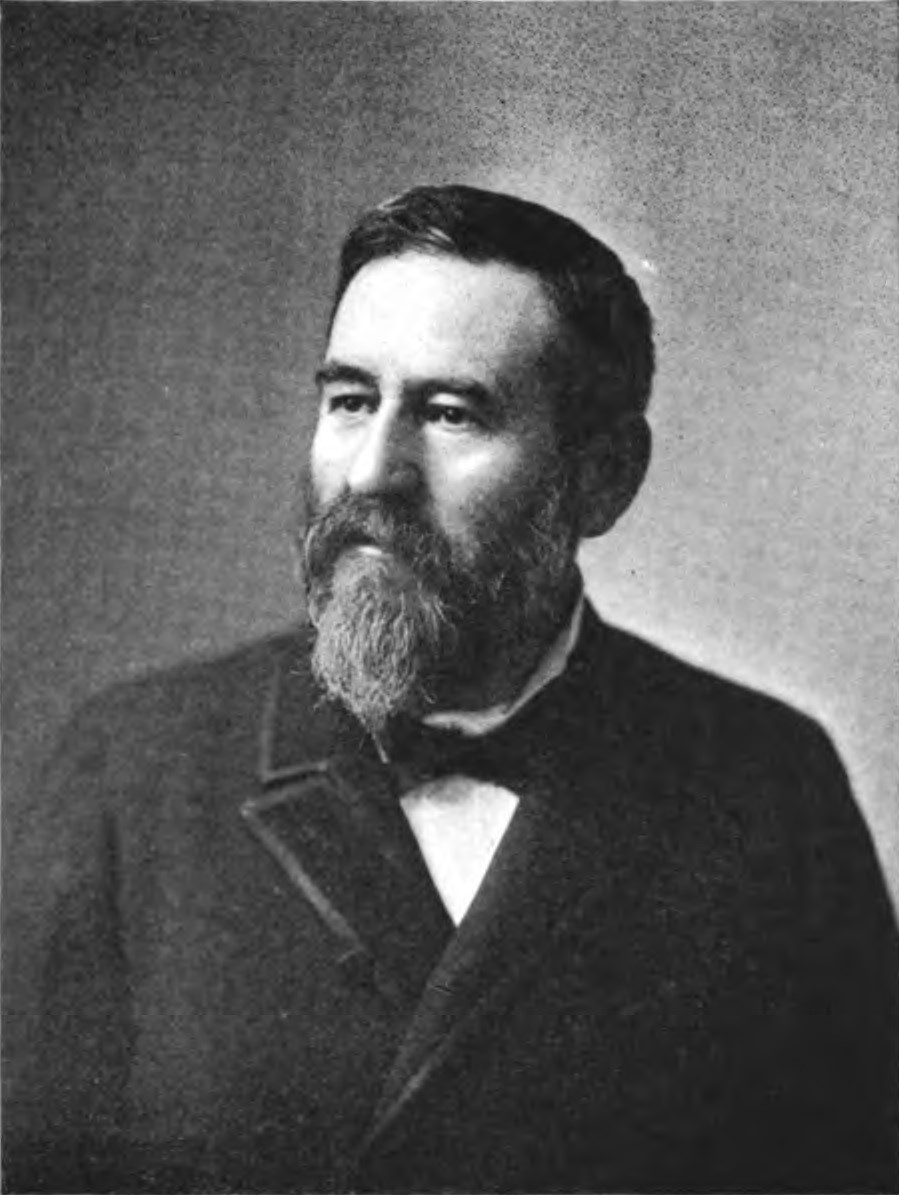
- Dewell in 1897

67th Lieutenant Governor of Connecticut
- In office January 6, 1897 – January 4, 1899
- Governor: Lorrin A. Cooke
- Preceded by: Lorrin A. Cooke
- Succeeded by: Lyman A. Mills

Personal details
- Born: James Dudley Dewell; September 3, 1837 Norfolk, Connecticut, U.S.
- Died: April 19, 1906 (aged 68) New Haven, Connecticut, U.S.
- Resting place: Evergreen Cemetery, New Haven, Connecticut, U.S.
- Party: Republican
- Spouse: Mary E. Keyes (m. 1860)
- Children: 5
- Parent(s): James Dewell; Mary Dewell née Humphrey
- Profession: Politician

James Dudley Dewell (September 3, 1837 – April 19, 1906) was an American politician and businessman who was the 67th Lieutenant Governor of Connecticut from 1897 to 1899.

== Biography ==
=== Career ===
James Dudley Dewell was born on September 3, 1837 in Norfolk, Connecticut; his parents were James Dewell, a manufacturer and merchant from Duchess County, New York, and Mary Humphrey. In late 1857 he came to New Haven, Connecticut and entered a mercantile career. His first business connection was as a salesman for the Bushnell and Co. grocery firm. He expanded the business; the firm's name was changed in 1864 to Bushnell & Dewell, and in 1877 to J. D. Dewell and Co. In 1865 he became the first lieutenant of the New Haven Grays.

He was vice-president of the Security Insurance company, vice-president of the National Savings bank and a director in the New Haven Water company and of various other corporations. He was also a director in the New Haven city bank in the last forty years of his life. He attended meetings of these institutions regularly, and no effort for the advancement of the city's financial interest was undertaken without his input. He was a member of the New Haven Colony Historical society, the Sons of the American Revolution and the Evergreen Cemetery association. He was a director of the Young Men's Institute. Dewell was interested in the World's Columbian Exposition at Chicago, Illinois and formed the company that had the Connecticut building at the fair taken down and rebuilt at Woodmont, Connecticut.

On September 2, 1896, Dewell and Lorrin A. Cooke were nominated as the Republican primary candidates for the lieutenant governor and the governor of Connecticut respectively. They won the gubernatorial election on November 3; Dewell was "highly gratified" at the election result and stated that the Republican victory was "[evidence] there is a good deal of common sense left in the people of the United States".

He succeeded Henry Sutton as manager of a fleet of schooners, several of which he personally built. He made two voyages to Puerto Rico after its acquisition by the United States, and gave many illustrated lectures on Puerto Rico. He also wrote and published an illustrated book about it.

=== Personal life and death ===
James D. Dewell married Mary E. Keyes from Norfolk on July 2, 1860. They had five children: Jessie K. Dewell, Charles Dewell, James D. Dewell Jr., Robert D. Dewell and F. W. Dewell. Dewell was a member of the Church of the Redeemer and belonged to Hiram Lodge #1 Ancient Free & Accepted Masons in New Haven, of which he was its worshipful master in 1868.

In his later years, Dewell had a chronic issue with what he believed to be acute indigestion, which he attempted to resolve every time by drinking hot water, but it was actually his heart that was causing him these troubles. In the early morning of April 19, 1906, Dewell complained of another attack of "indigestion". He arose from bed and went downstairs to drink some hot water. His wife advised him to have the family physician summoned, but Dewell said it would not be necessary and returned to bed. The physician was summoned a few hours later, but by then Dewell had deceased.

Political offices
Preceded by Lorrin A. Cooke	Lieutenant Governor of Connecticut; 1897–1899	Succeeded by Lyman A. Mills
