= Lorrin A. Cooke =

American politician (1831–1902)

Lorrin Alanson Cooke
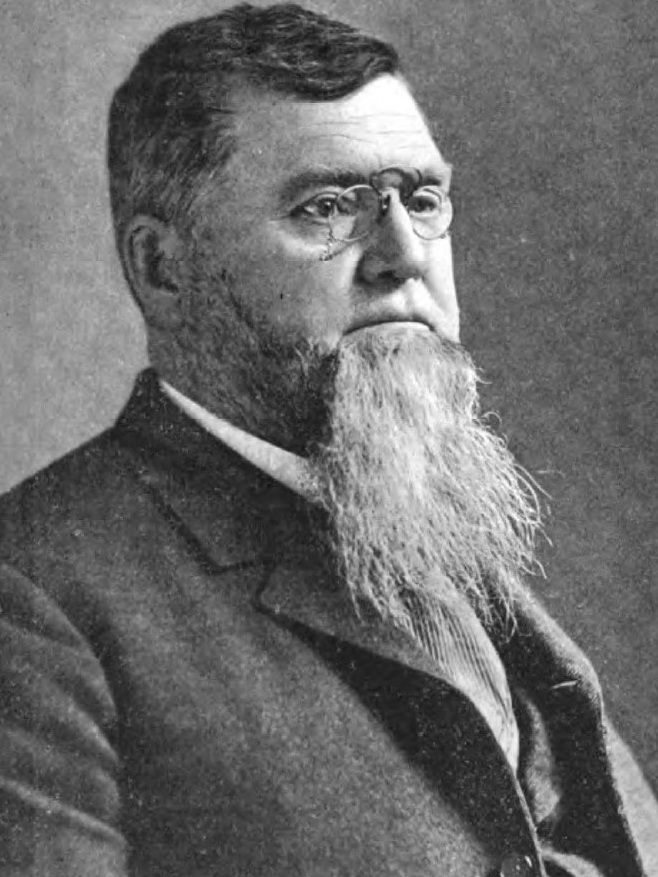

57th Governor of Connecticut
- In office January 6, 1897 – January 4, 1899
- Lieutenant: James D. Dewell
- Preceded by: Owen Vincent Coffin
- Succeeded by: George E. Lounsbury

66th Lieutenant Governor of Connecticut
- In office January 9, 1895 – January 6, 1897
- Governor: Owen Vincent Coffin
- Preceded by: Ernest Cady
- Succeeded by: James D. Dewell

62nd Lieutenant Governor of Connecticut
- In office January 8, 1885 – January 7, 1887
- Governor: Henry B. Harrison
- Preceded by: George G. Sumner
- Succeeded by: James L. Howard

Member of the Connecticut Senate from the 18th district
- In office 1883-1885

Member of the Connecticut General Assembly
- In office 1856

Personal details
- Born: April 6, 1831 New Marlborough, Massachusetts, U.S.
- Died: August 12, 1902 (aged 71) Winsted, Connecticut, U.S.
- Party: Republican
- Spouses: Matilda Eunice Webster Cooke; Josephine Ward Cooke
- Children: 3

Lorrin Alanson Cooke (April 6, 1831 – August 12, 1902) was an American politician and the 57th governor of Connecticut from 1897 to 1899.

== Biography ==
Cooke was born in New Marlborough, Massachusetts, the son of Levi Cooke and Amelia (Todd) Cooke. He was educated at Norfolk Academy in Connecticut, For several years after high school, he taught school in the Norfolk area in the winter and worked on his father's farm in the summer. By 1850, when Lorrin was nineteen, the Cooke family had moved to Colebrook. As a young farmer, he wanted to learn about and use the latest developments in agriculture. He joined the local agricultural society, was elected president, and his leadership began to develop.

== Career ==
Cooke worked with railroad officials to route a train through the remote Colebrook area, increasing sales as produce was freighted to the big city, and the town prospered. His election to the Connecticut General Assembly as the representative from the town of Colebrook in 1856, when he was only 25 years old, gave him his first experiences in state politics. He was married in 1858 to Matilda Eunice Webster, and married Josephine Ward in 1870. He had no children with his first wife and three with his second; Edward, Ward, and Edna. Only Edna lived to adulthood.

Cooke served as postmaster for Riverton, Connecticut, from 1877 to 1881, as state senator for the 18th District in the Connecticut State Senate from 1883 to 1885, and was President Pro Tempore of the Senate from 1884 to 1885.

In 1885 Cooke became the 62nd lieutenant governor of Connecticut. He held that position from 1885 to 1887. He was a delegate to the Republican National Convention from Connecticut in 1892. He served again (as the 66th lieutenant governor) from 1895 to 1897.

Cooke was elected the governor of Connecticut in 1896, and served from January 6, 1897, to January 4, 1899. During his term, he was successful in his attempts in leaving a financially sound state treasury, even with increased governmental expenditures, which resulted from the outbreak of the Spanish–American War. After leaving the office, Cooke remained active in civic events.

== Death ==
Cooke died in Winsted, Connecticut, on August 12, 1902. He is interred at Center Cemetery, Colebrook, Connecticut.

Party political offices
Preceded by Owen Vincent Coffin	Republican nominee for Governor of Connecticut; 1896	Succeeded by George E. Lounsbury
Political offices
Preceded by George G. Sumner	Lieutenant Governor of Connecticut; 1885-1887	Succeeded by James L. Howard
Preceded by Ernest Cady	Lieutenant Governor of Connecticut; 1895-1897	Succeeded by James D. Dewell
Preceded by Owen Vincent Coffin	Governor of Connecticut; 1897–1899	Succeeded by George E. Lounsbury
