= Owen Vincent Coffin =

American politician (1836–1921)

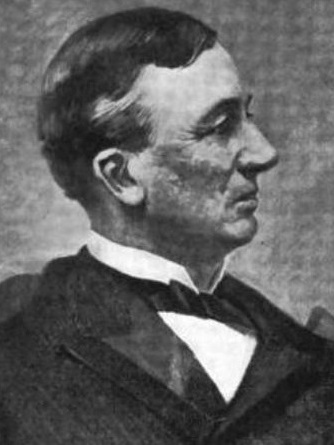

56th Governor of Connecticut
- In office January 9, 1895 – January 6, 1897
- Lieutenant: Lorrin A. Cooke
- Preceded by: Luzon B. Morris
- Succeeded by: Lorrin A. Cooke

Personal details
- Born: June 20, 1836 Mansfield, New York, U.S.
- Died: January 13, 1921 (aged 84)
- Party: Republican
- Spouse: Ellen Elizabeth Coe
- Children: 2
- Profession: banker, insurance, politician

Owen Vincent Coffin (June 20, 1836 – January 13, 1921) was an American politician and the 56th governor of Connecticut from 1895 to 1897.

== Biography ==
Coffin was born in Mansfield, New York. He studied at Cortland Academy and the Charlotteville Seminary. At seventeen he went to New York to be a salesman for a mercantile house, and two years later, in 1855, he became the New York representative of a prominent Connecticut manufacturing firm.

In 1858, he married Ellen Elizabeth Coe, and they had two children. When the American Civil War broke out in 1861, he was a strong supporter of the Union, but physically barred from active service. However, he served two terms as president of the Brooklyn YMCA and was active in the New York Committee of the United States Christian Commission.

== Career ==
In 1864, Coffin moved to Connecticut. He was president of the Middlesex Mutual (Fire) Assurance Company from 1865 to 1878. He was secretary and treasurer of the Farmers and Mechanics Savings Bank of Middletown, and he held the same offices and that of director for several years in the old Air Line Railroad Company. From 1872 to 1874 he was mayor of Middletown. In 1875, he was president of the Middlesex County Agricultural Society. A member of the Connecticut Senate for the 22nd District, he served in 1887 and also in 1889. In 1894 he became a member of the Connecticut Society of the Sons of the American Revolution.

== Governor of Connecticut ==
In 1894 Coffin was nominated for governor and elected by the greatest majority recorded up to that time. During his term, a legislation was passed that prohibited the use of convict labor in the production of food, drugs, and tobacco products. Several other changes also took place. A state board of mediation and arbitration was instituted, and a bill was enacted that disallowed children under the age of 14 from working, and a bill was constituted that enabled a worker's right to join a labor union.

Coffin left office on January 6, 1897, but stayed active in his business ventures, and in his civic and religious dealings. He received the honorary degree of LL.D. from Wesleyan University and is an honorary member of the college fraternity Delta Kappa Epsilon.

== Death ==
Coffin enjoyed shooting and fishing, and for years he was president of the Middletown Rifle Association as well as the vice-president of the Connecticut Rifle Association. He died on January 13, 1921, and is interred at Indian Hill Cemetery, Middletown, Connecticut.

Party political offices
Preceded by Samuel E. Merwin	Republican nominee for Governor of Connecticut; 1894	Succeeded by Lorrin A. Cooke
Political offices
Preceded by Luzon B. Morris	Governor of Connecticut; 1895-1897	Succeeded by Lorrin A. Cooke
