= James L. Howard =

American politician

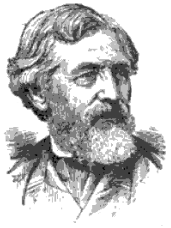

63rd Lieutenant Governor of Connecticut
- In office January 7, 1887 – January 10, 1889
- Governor: Phineas C. Lounsbury
- Preceded by: Lorrin A. Cooke
- Succeeded by: Samuel E. Merwin

Personal details
- Born: James Leland Howard; January 19, 1818; Windsor, Vermont, U.S.
- Died: May 1, 1906 (aged 88); Hartford, Connecticut, U.S.
- Political party: Whig Party, Republican
- Spouse: Anna Gilbert (m. 1842)
- Children: 5
- Parent(s): Leland Howard; Lucy Mason

James Leland Howard (January 18, 1818 – May 1, 1906) was an American businessman and politician who was the 63rd Lieutenant Governor of Connecticut from 1887 to 1889.

== Early life ==
James L. Howard was born in Windsor, Vermont. He was the eldest of eight children born to Reverend Leland Howard, a prominent Baptist clergyman, and Lucy (née Mason) Howard. His younger brother Frank Leonard Howard named his son Major James Leland Howard, the secretary of the Travelers Insurance Company, after James.

His paternal ancestors came to this country from Swansea in Wales, England, and were among the original landowners of the town of Milford and Mendon. James' great-grandfather, Benjamin Howard, was born in Mendon in 1713 but spent the latter part of his life in Jamaica, Vermont, where he died in 1783.

== Career ==
He received an academic education and started working as a clerk in New York City at the age of fifteen. In 1838, he moved to Hartford, Connecticut, where he started working in the manufacturing business on his own account in 1841, with his partner Hurlburt, he manufacturing carriage and saddle hardware. They soon added the manufacture of furnishings for railway cars. In 1876, Howard bought out his partner and the company was named James L. Howard & Company.

He was also president of the Hartford City Gas Light Company, director in the Phoenix National Bank, the Traveler's Insurance Company, the Hartford County Fire Insurance Company, the Retreat for the Insane, the Farmington River Power Company, and several other manufacturing companies. Additionally, he was on the board of directors of the New York & New England Railroad Company. The James L. Howard & Company still exists under the name of 1846.

=== Political career ===
Howard was originally a member of the Whig Party, and naturally became a member of the Republicans when that party was formed in 1856. He was an unsuccessful candidate to become mayor of Hartford in 1878 and 1880.

In the autumn of 1886, Howard was elected Lieutenant Governor of Connecticut. He served for one two-year period alongside the governor Phineas C. Lounsbury from January 7, 1887, to January 10, 1889.

== Personal life ==
On June 1, 1842, Howard was married to Miss Anna Gilbert (1821–1909), daughter of Joseph B. Gilbert of Hartford who served as the Connecticut State Treasurer in the 1840s. Together, James and Anna were the parents of five children, of which three daughters survived to adulthood, Alice, Edith and Mary Howard.

Howard died on May 1, 1906, in Hartford, Connecticut, and was buried at the Spring Grove Cemetery in Hartford.

Political offices
| Preceded by Lorrin A. Cooke | Lieutenant Governor of Connecticut; 1887-1889 | Succeeded by Samuel E. Merwin |
