= Timeline of Hartford, Connecticut =

The following is a timeline of the history of the city of Hartford, Connecticut, USA.

== Prior to 19th century ==
- 1623 – Fort Hoop built by Dutch West India Company.
- 1635 – English settlers arrive.
- 1636 – First Church congregation relocates to "Newtown", Connecticut, from New Town, Massachusetts.
- 1637
  - Settlement renamed Hartford.
  - Town square laid out.
- 1638 – Latin school founded.
- 1640 – Burying Ground established (approximate date).
- 1647 – Alse Young hanged for witchcraft.
- 1662 – Hartford serving as capital of Connecticut Colony.
- 1670 – Indian treaty signed.
- 1701 – Hartford and New Haven designated joint capitals of Connecticut Colony.
- 1720 - “Hartford Hills” separate to form the town of Bolton.
- 1758 - Noah Webster born here, publisher of Grammatical Institute of the English Language
- 1764 – Connecticut Courant newspaper begins publication.
- 1774 – Library Company formed.
- 1775 – 4th Connecticut Regiment organized.
- 1783 – Town of East Hartford separates from Hartford.
- 1784
  - City chartered.
  - American Mercury newspaper begins publication.
- 1788 – Woollen mill in operation.
- 1790 – Population: 2,683.
- 1792 – Hartford Bank incorporated.
- 1796
  - American Cookery published.
  - State House built.
- 1797 – Joseph Steward's museum opens.

== 19th century ==
- 1810 – Hartford Fire Insurance Company incorporated.
- 1812 – Chauncey Goodrich elected mayor.
- 1814
  - Hartford Convention.
  - Phoenix Bank incorporated.
- 1818
  - Bridge over Connecticut River built.
  - American Asylum for Deaf-mutes incorporated.
- 1819 – Aetna Insurance Company and Society for Savings incorporated.
- 1820 – Population: 4,726.
- 1823
  - Washington College founded.
  - Hartford Female Seminary established.
  - Connecticut River Steamboat Co. incorporated.
- 1824
  - Nathaniel Terry becomes mayor.
  - Connecticut Retreat for the Insane opens.
- 1825
  - Connecticut Historical Society established.
  - Times & Hartford Advertiser newspaper begins publication.
  - Connecticut River Banking Co. and Protection Insurance Co. incorporated.
- 1826
  - The Hartford Times newspaper begins publication.
  - African Religious Society church built on Talcott Street.
- 1827 – Christ Church Cathedral built.
- 1830 – Population: 7,074.
- 1833
  - Miss Draper's Seminary for Young Ladies in operation (approximate date).
  - Hartford Literary and Religious Institution and Colored Methodist Episcopal congregation formed.
  - Farmers & Mechanics Bank incorporated.
- 1834 – Exchange Bank incorporated.
- 1835 – Patriot and Democrat newspaper begins publication.
- 1836
  - Firemen's Benevolent Society organized.
  - Northern Courier newspaper begins publication.
- 1837 – Daily Courant newspaper begins publication.
- 1838 – Hartford Young Men's Institute formed.
- 1840
  - Hartford Times newspaper begins publication.
  - Population: 9,468.
- 1841 – Washington Temperance Society, Martha Washington Temperance Society, and Young Men's Temperance Society organized.
- 1843 – Hartford Journal newspaper begins publication.
- 1844
  - Hartford and New Haven Railroad and Hartford and Springfield Railroad begin operating.
  - Wadsworth Atheneum opens.
- 1847 – I. & G. Fox Co. established.
- 1848 – Colt's Patent Firearms Manufacturing Company founded.
- 1849 – The Republican newspaper begins publication.
- 1850 – Population: 13,555.
- 1853 – Aetna Life Insurance Company incorporated.
- 1854
  - Henry C. Deming becomes mayor.
  - West Hartford municipality splits from Hartford.
  - Connecticut State Library and Hartford Hospital established.
- 1856
  - City rechartered.
  - Charter Oak felled in storm.
  - Hartford Evening Press newspaper begins publication.
  - Armsmear built for Samuel Colt.
- 1858
  - The Putnam Phalanx, a ceremonial honor guard, established.
  - Hartford Daily Post newspaper begins publication.
- 1860
  - Boys' Club founded.
  - Population: 26,917.
  - Police department established.
- 1864 – Travelers Insurance Company founded.
- 1865 – Theological Institute of Connecticut relocates to Harford.
- 1866 – Charles R. Chapman becomes mayor.
- 1868
  - Bushnell Park laid out.
  - Cedar Hill Cemetery consecrated.
- 1869 – Travelers Journal newspaper begins publication.
- 1872
  - New York, New Haven and Hartford Railroad and Ados Israel Synagogue founded.
  - Windsor Avenue Congregational Church built (approximate date).
- 1873 – Metropolitan African Methodist Episcopal Zion Church built.
- 1874 – Mark Twain's house built on Farmington Avenue.
- 1876 – Cheney Building constructed.
- 1877 – Hartford Society for Decorative Art formed.
- 1878
  - George G. Sumner elected mayor.
  - State Capitol building constructed.
  - Pope Manufacturing Company in business, making Columbia Bicycles.
- 1880 – Morgan Bulkeley becomes mayor.
- 1881 – Watkinson School founded.
- 1882 – Post Office and Custom House built.
- 1883
  - Hartford Telegram newspaper begins publication.
  - Hartford Electric Light Co. organized.
- 1884 – The Wooden Nutmeg begins publication.
- 1885 – Hartford Camera Club organized.
- 1886 – Soldiers and Sailors Memorial Arch dedicated.
- 1888 – Hartford Morning Record newspaper begins publication.
- 1889 – Union Station built.
- 1890 – Population: 53,230.
- 1892 – Hartford Public Library opens.
- 1896
  - City consolidated.
  - Parsons Theatre opens on April 1, 1896.
- 1897 – Elizabeth Park laid out (approximate date).
- 1898
  - Pope Park laid out.
  - La Salette Missionary college in operation.
  - Sage-Allen building constructed.
- 1899 – Corning Fountain in Bushnell Park dedicated.
- 1900 - Population: 79,850.

== 20th century ==
- 1901 – Underwood Typewriter Company factory in operation.
- 1908
  - Bridge over Connecticut River rebuilt.
  - Royal Typewriter Company manufactory in operation.
  - Morgan art gallery built.
- 1909 – Flood.
- 1910
  - Connecticut State Library and Supreme Court Building constructed.
  - Population: 98,915.
- 1919 – Travelers Tower built.
- 1920 – The Hartt School founded.
- 1921 – University of Connecticut School of Law established.
- 1925 – WTIC (AM) radio begins broadcasting.
- 1930 – Horace Bushnell Memorial Hall opens.
- 1931 – Society of the Descendants of the Founders of Hartford organized.
- 1934
  - February 7: Premiere of Thomson's opera Four Saints in Three Acts.
  - Symphony Society of Greater Hartford formed.
- 1935 – Thomas J. Spellacy elected mayor.
- 1938 – Hurricane.
- 1941 – Windsor Locks airfield active.
- 1942 – Connecticut Opera formed.
- 1944
  - Interstate 84 constructed.
  - Circus fire.
- 1945
  - Hartford Collection of local history established at the public library.
  - State governor's residence locates to Prospect Avenue in Hartford.
- 1947
  - Edward N. Allen becomes mayor.
  - Bradley International Airport established.
  - Hillyer College established.
- 1950 – Population: 177,397.
- 1955 – Hartford Graduate School established by Rensselaer Polytechnic Institute.
- 1957 – University of Hartford chartered.
- 1962 – Cathedral of St. Joseph rebuilt.
- 1963
  - Hartford Stage founded.
  - Phoenix Life Insurance Company Building constructed.
- 1964 – Constitution Plaza built.
- 1967 – Greater Hartford Community College established.
- 1968 – Harriet Beecher Stowe House museum opens.

The original Hartford Whalers logo (1979–1992), designed by Peter Good, a Connecticut-based graphic designer. It combines a green "W" with a blue whale's tail to create the letter "H" in the negative (white) space in the center of the logo between the two shapes.

- 1970
  - Racial unrest.
  - Cinestudio founded.
- 1974
  - Mark Twain House museum opens.
  - Hartford Advocate begins publication.
- 1975
  - Hartford Civic Center opens.
  - Real Art Ways established.
  - Valley Advocate and Hartford Inquirer newspapers begin publication.
- 1976 – Connecticut Transit Hartford founded.
- 1979
  - Hartford Whalers hockey team active.
  - Charter Oak Cultural Center established.
- 1980
  - Population: 136,392.
  - City Place I built.
- 1987
  - Hartford Karma Thegsum Choling established.
  - Carrie Saxon Perry elected mayor.
  - Hartford News begins publication.

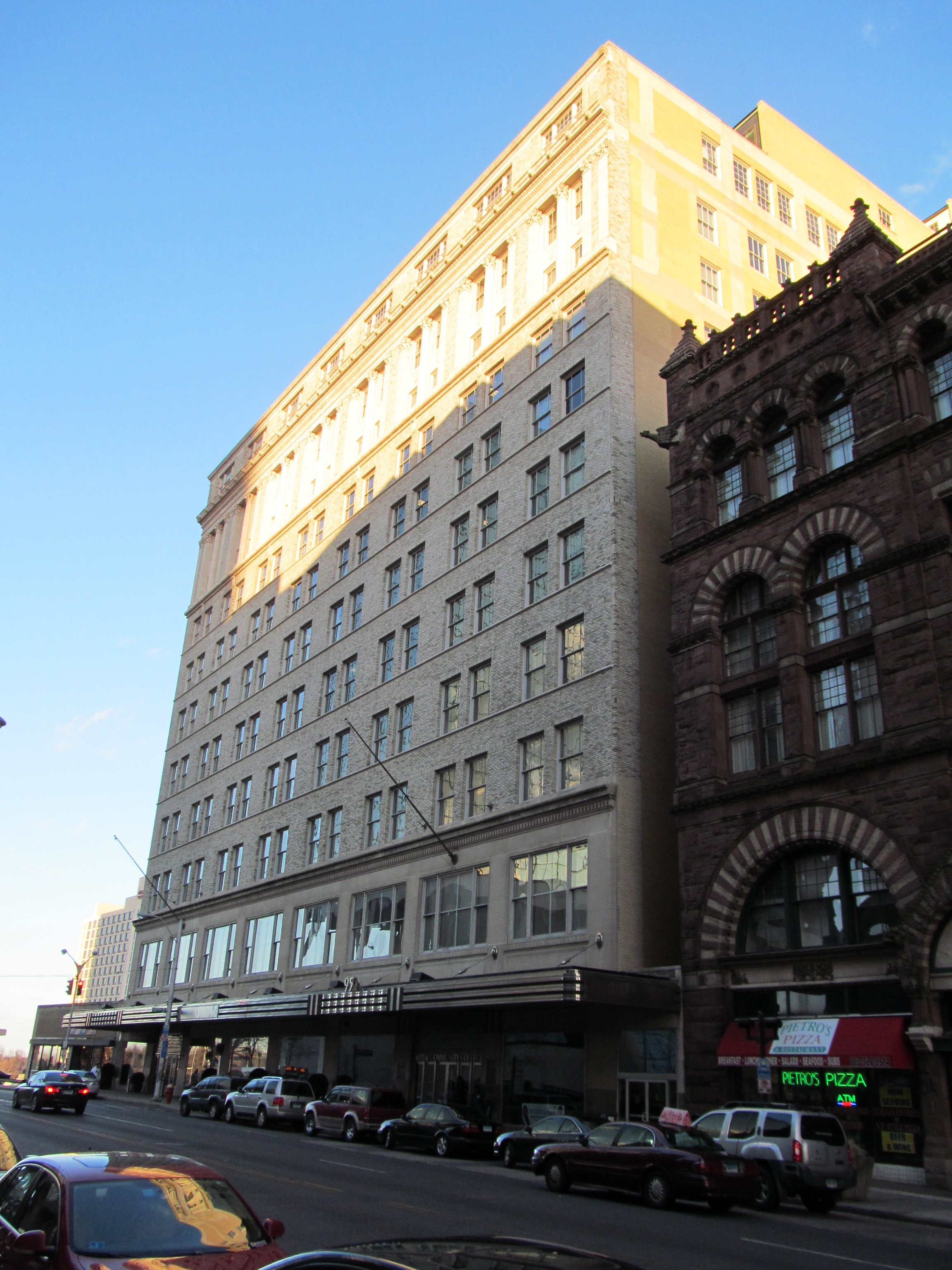
Capital Community College, Hartford CT

- 1992
  - Capital Community College established.
  - Connecticut Forum founded.
- 1998 – City website online (approximate date).
- 1999 – Hartford Magnet Trinity College Academy established.

== 21st century ==
- 2001 – Eddie Perez elected mayor.
- 2004 – University High School of Science and Engineering established.

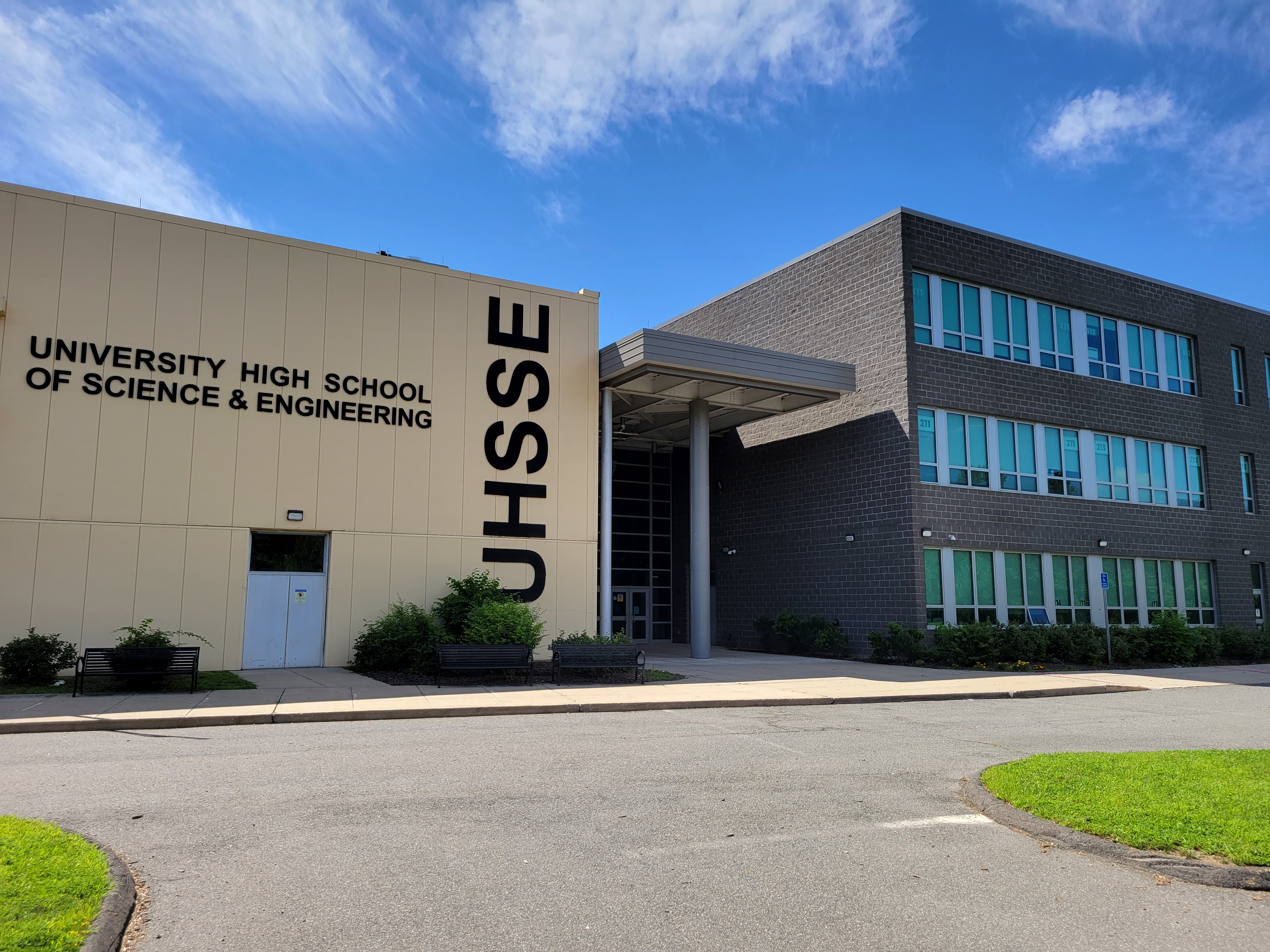
University High School of Science and Engineering, Hartford CT

- 2005 – Connecticut Convention Center opens.
- 2008 – Global Communications Academy opens.
- 2009 – Connecticut Science Center opens.
- 2010
  - Population: 124,775.
  - Pedro Segarra becomes mayor.
- 2011 – Hurricane Irene.
- 2016 – Hartford Connecticut Temple of The Church of Jesus-Christ of Latter-day Saints dedicated in Farmington, Connecticut, a suburb. It is the second Latter-day Saint temple dedicated in New England.

== See also ==
- History of Hartford, Connecticut
- National Register of Historic Places listings in Hartford, Connecticut

== Bibliography ==
published in the 19th century

- William Smith Porter (1842), "Hartford in 1640", Historical notices of Connecticut, Hartford: E. Geer's Press, OCLC 6658847, OL 271754M
- Geer's Hartford City Directory for 1845. Hartford: Elihu Geer. 1845.
- Isaac William Stuart (1853), Hartford in the olden time: its first thirty years, by Scæva, ed. by W.M.B. Hartley, Hartford: Brown, OL 23440748M
- Joseph Sabin, ed. (1877). "Hartford, Conn.". Bibliotheca Americana. Vol. 8. New York. OCLC 13972268.
- "Hartford" . Encyclopædia Britannica. Vol. 11 (9th ed.). 1880. pp. 496–497.
- The charter and revised ordinances of the city of Hartford, Hartford: Press of the Fowler & Miller Co., 1884, OL 13999518M
- J. Hammond Trumbull (1886), The memorial history of Hartford County, Connecticut, 1633-1884, Boston: E. L. Osgood, OCLC 1187853, OL 13499736M
- Hartford town votes, 1635-1716, Hartford: Connecticut Historical Society, 1897, OL 14010992M

published in the 20th century

- Geer's Hartford City Directory. Hartford: Hartford Printing Co. 1903.
- "Hartford" . Encyclopædia Britannica. Vol. 13 (11th ed.). 1910. pp. 32–34.
- "Hartford", Handbook of New England, Boston: Porter E. Sargent, 1916, OCLC 16726464
- Federal Writers' Project (1938). "Hartford". Connecticut: a Guide to its Roads, Lore, and People. American Guide Series. Boston: Houghton Mifflin. hdl:2027/mdp.39015001142218 – via HathiTrust.. + Chronology
- Ory Mazar Nergal, ed. (1980), "Hartford", Encyclopedia of American Cities, New York: E.P. Dutton, OL 4120668M
- George Thomas Kurian (1994), "Hartford, Connecticut", World Encyclopedia of Cities, vol. 1: North America, Santa Barbara, California: ABC-CLIO, OL 1431653M (fulltext via Open Library)

published in the 21st century

- "Connecticut: Hartford", New England (3rd ed.), Lonely Planet, 2002, p. 476+, OL 24765202M
