= CREC =

CREC may refer to:

- China Railway Group Limited, a state-owned enterprise of the People's Republic of China
- National Institute of Technology Calicut, a technical university
- Communion of Reformed Evangelical Churches, a Protestant denomination in the United States, Canada, Japan, Russia, Hungary, and Poland
- Capitol Region Education Council, a Connecticut entity established by state statute
