= Mary Cadorette =

American actress

- Born: March 31, 1957 (age 68)
- Other names: Mary Cadorette-Daly
- Education: University of Connecticut (BFA)
- Occupations: Actress; teacher
- Years active: 1980–2000
- Known for: Three's a Crowd; Three's Company; Perry Mason: The Case of the Musical Murder; Night Court; Stewardess School
- Title: Miss Connecticut 1975
- Spouse(s): Michael Eisen (m. 1982; div. ??); William Harris (m. ??; died 2010) Michael Daly (m. 2015)
- Website: nugandbug.com

Mary Cadorette (born March 31, 1957) is an American actress best known for playing Jack Tripper's live-in girlfriend, flight attendant Vicky Bradford, on the short-lived 1984 Three's Company spin-off Three's a Crowd.

== Education ==
Cadorette graduated with a BFA in Dramatic Arts and Theater from the University of Connecticut in 1979.

== Television, theater and film credits ==
In 1974, Cadorette participated in a dance pageant and won the Miss Dance of America Title. In 1976, she participated in the Miss America Pageant as "Miss Connecticut". In 1981, she was acting in commercials. In 1984, the producers of Three's Company decided at the end of the 8th season that they would spin off a new show starring John Ritter with a love interest. Over 500 women auditioned for the love interest role who would be named Vicky Bradford. During auditions Ritter felt an immediate connection to Cadorette, who was cast as flight stewardess Vicky Bradford, and introduced in the Three's Company episode "Cupid Works Overtime". Cadorette as Vicky appeared in two more episodes of Three's Company before she began as a co-star in Three's a Crowd. The show lasted one season.

Cadorette performed in multiple dinner theatres with the USO. She also spent three and a half years on Broadway as an understudy for the lead role of "Peggy Sawyer" in the Broadway musical 42nd Street. She later took over the role. In 1990, she landed the recurring role of Margaret Turner on Night Court.

Cadorette has been in multiple films, including Stewardess School and The Rat Pack. In the 1980s she was also seen on a number of game shows, including The $25,000 Pyramid, Super Password, and Body Language.

== Later career/return to Connecticut ==
In 1999, Cadorette left California and moved back home to Connecticut to take care of her mother who had suffered a stroke. Her mother died eight years later. She continues to act in local stage productions, such as playing Mrs. Gibbs in Our Town for Connecticut Repertory Theatre in 2011.

== The Chapeau Rouge Dance Project ==
Cadorette and two friends, whom she had known since they were in dance school as children, decided to take up dancing again and share their craft and experience. They formed "The Chapeau Rouge Dance Project," encouraging former, retired, (and often older) dance students to attend classes in the dance studio that they rented.

== Personal life ==
Cadorette was once married to Michael Eisen. Later, she married William Harris, and went by the name Mary Cadorette-Harris. William Harris died on October 15, 2010. On November 1, 2015, she married her childhood sweetheart Michael Daly.

In 2014, Cadorette opened an antique store in Marlborough, Connecticut, called Nug and Bug Antique Collectibles.

== Directorial credits/educational career ==
- In March 2011, Cadorette directed and choreographed Hairspray at Glastonbury High School in Glastonbury, Connecticut.
- In March 2012, Cadorette directed and choreographed 42nd Street at Glastonbury High School utilizing some original Gower Champion choreography.
- In May 2013, Cadorette directed and choreographed Hairspray at the Greater Hartford Academy of the Arts in Hartford, Connecticut.

Other directorial/choreographical credits at the Greater Hartford Academy of the Arts include: A Day in Hollywood / A Night in the Ukraine (December 2014) and West Side Story (May 2016)

== Filmography ==
Year	Title	Role	Notes
1980	Those Lips, Those Eyes	Dancer	Feature film
1984	Three's Company	Vicky Bradford	Episode: "Cupid Works Overtime"; Episode: "Friends and Lovers: Part 1"; Episode: "Friends and Lovers: Part 2"
1984	Battle of the Network Stars XVII	Self - ABC Team	
1984–85	Three's a Crowd	Vicky Bradford	Main role (22 episodes)
1985	Battle of the Network Stars XVIII	Self - ABC Team	
1986	The Love Boat	Darlene Harper	Episode: "The Art Lover/Couples/Made for Each Other"
1986	Simon & Simon	Amy Gayle	Episode: "The Last Harangue"
1986	Stewardess School	Kelly Johnson	Feature film
1987	The Colbys	Researcher	Episode: "Fallon's Baby"
1987	My Two Dads	Elizabeth	Episode: "Whose Night Is It, Anyway?"
1988–89	The Munsters Today	Dee Dee Nelson	Episode: "Vampire Pie"; Episode: "Two Left Feet"; Episode: "Neighborly Munsters:
1988	Murphy Brown	Sherry French (Secretary #1)	Episode: "Respect"
1989	Monsters	Sherrie	Episode: "Fools' Gold"
1989	Perry Mason: The Case of the Musical Murder	Leslie Singer	Television film
1989	Matlock	Donna	Episode: "The Scrooge"
1989–90	Who's the Boss?	Deb	Episode: "Sex, Lies and Exercise Tape"; Episode: "Micelli's Marauders"
1990	The Bradys	Valerie	Episode: "The Brady 500"
1990	Jake and the Fatman	Jeannie Wicks	Episode: "Exactly Like You"
1990–91	Night Court	Margaret Turner	Episode: "When Harry Met Margaret"; Episode: "Can't Buy Me Love"; Episode: "A Night Court at the Opera"; Episode: "Alone Again, Naturally"
1991	Eddie Dodd	Prosecutor Jessica Tilden	Episode: "Unnecessary Losses"
1991	Parker Lewis Can't Lose	Cathy Lee Austin	Episode: "Fat Boy and Little Man"
1991	The Gambler Returns: The Luck of the Draw	Edwina	Television film
1997	JAG	Rebecca Bauwer	Episode: "The Guardian"
1997	ER	Carla Kramer	Episode: "One More for the Road"
1998	Rhapsody in Bloom	Debra's Girlfriend #1	Television film
1998	The Rat Pack	Betty	Television film
2000	Beyond Belief: Fact or Fiction	Marissa's Mother	Episode: "Morning Sickness"
