= Metropolitan Learning Center =

Metropolitan Learning Center may refer to either of two public schools in the United States:

- Metropolitan Learning Center in Portland, Oregon, which occupies the historic Couch School building
- Metropolitan Learning Center in Bloomfield, Connecticut
