= Bulkeley High School =

Public school in Hartford, Connecticut, United States

Morgan Gardner Bulkeley High School

Location
- 300 Wethersfield Avenue; Hartford, Hartford County, Connecticut 06114; United States; 41°44′51″N 72°40′22″W

Information
- School type: Public
- Founded: 1926 (100 years ago)
- School district: Hartford Public Schools
- CEEB code: 070285
- Principal: Matthew Espinosa
- Faculty: 42.00 (FTE)
- Grades: 9-12
- Enrollment: 552 (2024–2025)
- Student to teacher ratio: 13.14
- Colors: Maroon & Gold
- Athletics conference: Greater Hartford Conference
- Mascot: Bulldogs
- Website: bulkeley.hartfordschools.org

Morgan Gardner Bulkeley High School (known as Bulkeley High School) is a public secondary school on the south side of Hartford, Connecticut. It was founded in 1926 and is part of the Hartford Public Schools district. The school has an academic focus on teacher preparation and humanities, as well as a computer science track. The school also has language classes in Arabic and Spanish.

== Student body ==
Bulkeley serves students in grades 9-12, with 616 students enrolled in the 2021-22 school year. Due to ongoing building renovations, students currently attend school at other locations (as of the 2021-22 school year).

Many Bulkeley students speak languages other than English, with about 36% classified as English Language Learners (compared to 9% statewide). About three quarters of students identify as Hispanic, one in five identify as Black or African American, and other groups are represented in smaller numbers. Students at the school experience a high rate of poverty, as measured by the proportion who qualify for the National School Lunch Program (88%, as compared to 41% of children enrolled in public schools statewide).

In the graduating class of 2022, seniors were accepted to colleges in Connecticut such as Capital Community College; Manchester Community College; the University of Connecticut; Eastern, Central, Southern and Western Connecticut State University; Quinnipiac University; as well as colleges in Massachusetts, Rhode Island, New Hampshire, New York, New Jersey, Pennsylvania and further afield.

== History ==
After World War I, Hartford's population grew rapidly, from just under 100,000 in 1910 to 163,000 in 1930. By the mid-1920s, Hartford Public High School could no longer serve all the city's secondary school students. The Hartford city government decided to build two new schools: Weaver High School for the north end, and Bulkeley High School for the south end. Bulkeley's original building was designed by the same architects as Weaver High School, Frank Irving Cooper and Edward T. Wiley.

Bulkeley opened in 1926 and was named after businessman and politician Morgan Gardner Bulkeley, who was Mayor of Hartford, a US Senator for the State of Connecticut, the 54th Governor, the first president of the National Baseball League, and for over forty years the president of the Aetna Life Insurance Company. When the school opened it had 949 students and 61 teachers; its first graduating class in 1927 had 115 students. Students attended school in the original building until 1974, when the high school moved two blocks to its current site at 300 Wethersfield Avenue. The 1926 structure is now home to the Michael D. Fox Elementary School.

At the end of the 1930s Bulkeley was one of three public high schools in Hartford, along with Hartford Public High School and Thomas Snell Weaver High School. Its enrollment of 1,743 represented about 28% of all high school students in Hartford (excluding junior high school).

Principal Gayle Allen-Greene served as head of the school for 20 years, retiring in 2017. The current principal is Matthew Espinosa, replacing Digna Marte.

== Renovation and finance investigation ==
In 2018 the school building was slated for major renovations, estimated at $150 million, including plans to centralize the Hartford school district's food service at Bulkeley. During renovations, 9th and 10th graders attended school at 585 Wethersfield Avenue in Hartford (South Campus), while 11th and 12th graders attended school at 395 Lyme Street (North Campus).

The renovation project was hampered by corruption and mismanagement of the renovation finances. Federal investigators focused on decisions by Konstantinos Diamantis, who was then the director of school construction financing. During the investigation the case expanded, and federal prosecutors investigated financial mismanagement of over $1 billion in state funds. Connecticut Governor Ned Lamont fired Diamantis in October 2021 when suspicions arose about corrupt spending. Diamantis was found guilty of extortion, bribery, conspiracy and lying to federal investigators, but fled to Greece before sentencing and “did not intend to return to the United States” as of September 2026.

Renovations at Bulkeley High School were completed in 2025, and the school reopened in January 2026.

== Athletics ==
Wins in CIAC State Championships
Sport	Class	Year(s)
Basketball (boys)	L	1951, 2009
Basketball (boys)	LL	2000
Basketball (girls)	L	2006
Golf (boys)	N/A	1947, 1948
Soccer (boys)	L	1975
Track and field (indoor, boys)	L	1979
Track and field (outdoor, boys)	L	1976
