= Félix Granda =

Spanish painter

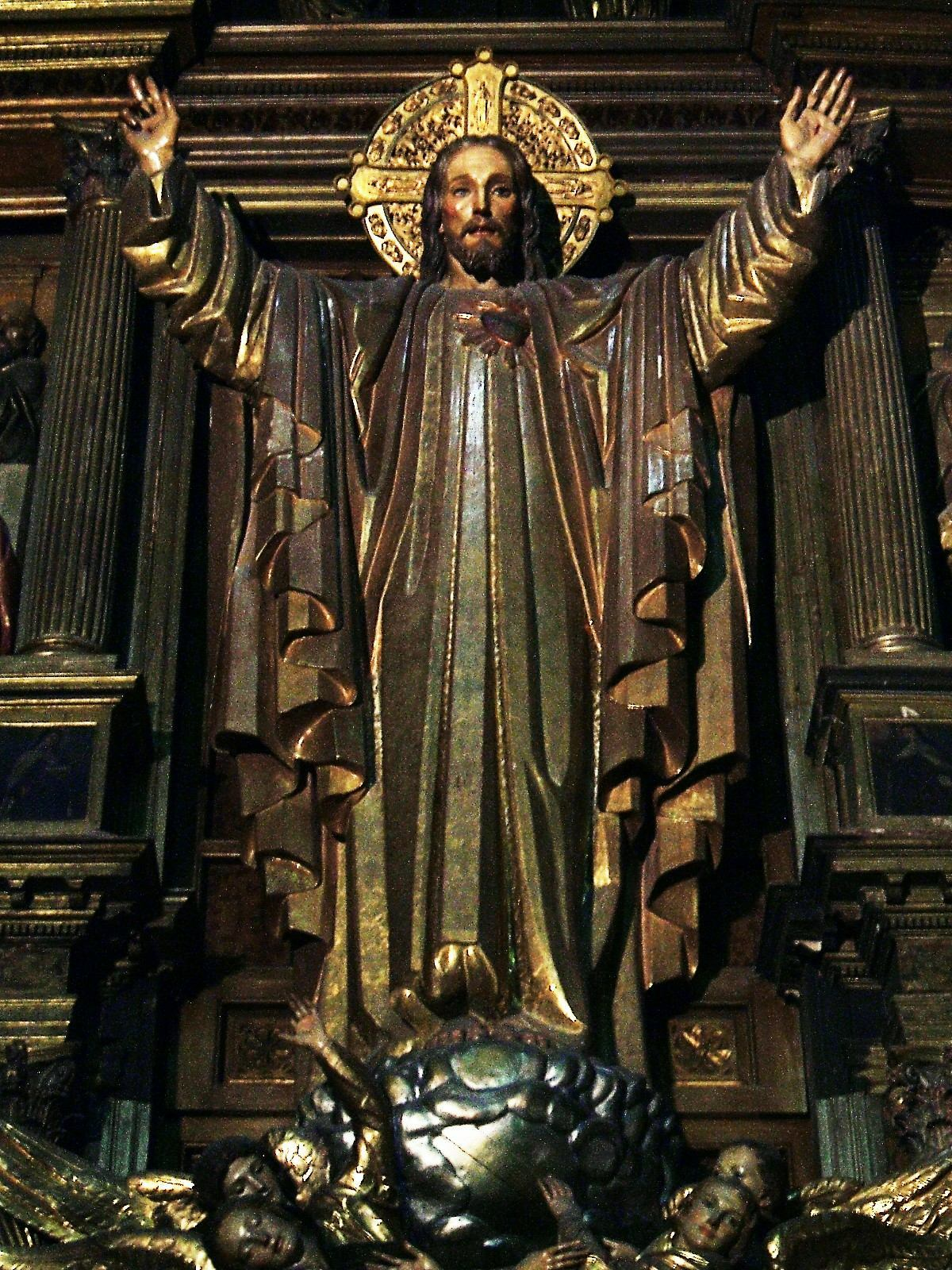
Sculpture of the Sacred Heart of Jesus, work of Father Granda, in the Main Altarpiece of the National Sanctuary of the Great Promise, Valladolid, Spain

Rev. Félix Granda y Álvarez Buylla (21 February 1868 – 1954) was a Spanish Roman Catholic priest and sacred artist who founded the liturgical art workshop Talleres de Arte and directed its activities until his death. The workshop is now known as Talleres de Arte Granda in Spanish-speaking countries and as Granda Liturgical Arts in English-speaking countries.

== Early life ==
Félix Granda was born on 21 February 1868 in Mieres, in the Spanish principality of Asturias. He was the oldest of the six children of Wenceslao Granda, a physician, and his wife Elvira. He began studies for the priesthood at the minor seminary in Oviedo at the age of ten, and refined his skills in draftsmanship, painting, sculpture and metalwork by studying with artisans. He spent many summers in Muros de Nalon with a group of painters that included Joaquín Sorolla y Bastida and Cecilio Pla y Gallardo. He founded Granda one of the world's leading Catholic liturgical art and design studios, in 1891 in Madrid.

He was ordained a priest of the Diocese of Madrid in 1891.

== Talleres de Arte ==
That same year, at the age of 23, Granda founded Talleres de Arte in Madrid. The Archbishop-Bishop of Madrid-Alcalá, Jose Maria Cos y Macho, whom Granda had known when Cos was the rector of Oviedo Cathedral, approved the young priest's ministry, writing:

The works of art that leave your factories will open paths, as much in the republics of South America as in the European nations... by the profundity of the thought and the Christian spirit that animates them, by the newness and beauty of the drawing and the careful execution... Continue without hesitation, for the good of religion, the profession of the arts, joining perfectly your sacerdotal vocation with your artistic aptitude.

The original workshop was located on Calle Fernando el Santo in Madrid, but was soon relocated to the Hotel de las Rosas residence in the Altos del Hipodromo to accommodate the growing number of artisans. Granda described the location:

To be able to make the art that we intend, we all live within a morally and physically sanitary environment... In the healthiest part of Madrid, at the extension of la Castellana, to the left of the racetrack, are buildings surrounded by gardens, with studios, workshops and living quarters that are spacious and flooded with air and light.

Félix Granda lived at the Hotel de las Rosas with his sister Candida, a childless widow who assisted him in the administration of the workshop. By 1900, over 200 artisans were employed by Talleres de Arte, creating altarpieces, statuary, tabernacles, reliquaries, monstrances, sacred vessels and other works of sacred art. The relationships with artists in various media that Granda had established in his formative years proved invaluable when gathering together so many artisans into a single enterprise. In 1911, he wrote:

My desire is to decorate; that is, to bring order, subordinating to a determined end various works of art, and that is why I have tried to gather under one address all those artistic professions that I believe most necessary for my aim: painting, sculpture, goldsmithery, enamelwork, carpentry, work in bronze; as well as drawing and embroidery for religious vestments.

Granda began no new project without a detailed explanation of its iconography to all of the artisans who would contribute. Each studio was directed by a master of the craft who managed the artisans and trained the apprentices. Labor ceased at dusk, when the workers were given time for formation, classes and conferences. The sculptors Jose Capuz Mamano, Luis Ortega Bru and Juan Vargas Cortes were among the many artisans who received their training at Talleres de Arte.

In 1911, the year of the International Eucharistic Congress in Madrid, Félix Granda won the gold medal at the city's Exposition of Decorative Arts. The same year saw the publication of the workshop's first general catalogue.

== Artistic philosophy and influences ==
The animating principle of the workshop was taken from Psalm 25.8: I have loved, O Lord, the beauty of Thy house; and the place where Thy glory dwelleth. This, coupled with Félix Granda's own aspiration: I am moved by the ideal of employing all my strength to make beautiful Thy temples and Thine altars, became the motto of Talleres de Arte. The emblem of the workshop depicted a man praying at the foot of an olive tree shedding many of its branches. The words that the man speaks are written on a banderole: Vetera novis augere et perficere (a motto of Pope Leo XIII: To augment and perfect the old by way of the new) and Defracti sunt rami ut ego insererer (Romans 11.19: The branches were broken off, that I might be grafted in).

When Granda wrote a short exposition of his purpose in 1911, he began by quoting the aforementioned motto of Pope Leo XIII, as well as that of Pope Pius X: Instaurare omnia in Christo (Ephesians 1.10: To restore all things in Christ). The twofold theme of innovation and restoration was essential to his artistic and religious mission. Ernest Grimaud DeCaux, the Madrid correspondent for The Times explained:

At first sight he but returns to the first ages of the Church, when art was utilized to bring home to the multitudes, by the aid of symbols, religious dogmas and mysteries. Where Father Granda's originality shows itself, however, where a new art appears, is in his method of representing the eternal Christian symbolisms. He buries himself in the past and by patient study absorbs the spirit of the ancient symbols and with the knowledge thus acquired, aided by his mastery of the Scriptures, which are his code, he throws such power of expression into his work that not only every article dealt with, but even every line and shape of each piece has its symbolical voice recalling some act of Christ, a saying of the Holy Fathers, or a dogma of the Catholic religion. This eternal theme would be cold and monotonous if clothed in the past forms of art. In the hands of this artist priest penetrated with the spirit of the past, versed in the essence of Christianity, but with a modern mind, it takes a new shape, and it is in this respect that Father Granda is an innovator, because, whilst still going to the old well of tradition, he draws fresh water from it.

Granda himself wrote:

To make an art impregnated with the scent of Christ, saturated with memories of the past, where the Biblical spirit beats; and that this art be alive, united to the trunk of the traditions; and because it is of the past, that it correspond to the needs of the present: such is my desire... To begin a work from those same origins; to drink from the same fonts that inspired Christian art in its most glorious epochs. All this, deeply felt and executed with careful study, is what I desire to do with my own labors, and is what I want the artists and workers who form these workshops to do.

Under his direction, Talleres de Arte fabricated work in a variety of styles: Mozarabic, Romanesque, Gothic, Baroque and Rococo. Granda sought inspiration for his artwork from the beginnings of Christian history to his own time. When describing the iconographic schemes in his work, he often justified them by the precedent of Christian antiquity, citing studies by the archaeologists Antonio Bosio, Giovanni Giustino Ciampini, Giovanni Caetano Bottari, Rev. Giuseppe Marchi, Giovanni Battista de Rossi, Louis Perret, Rev. Joseph-Alexander Martigny and Alphonse de Boissieu.

Yet Granda also corresponded with the architects of the Catalan Art Nouveau, such as Antoni Gaudí, who represented the artistic vanguard of his time, and he shared their enthusiasm for daring incorporation of natural forms into sacred art. For example, both Gaudí and Granda were fond of using figures of sea turtles as supports; Gaudí for the bases of the columns of the Sagrada Familia, and Granda as the legs of his monstrances. Granda was at times even bolder than Gaudí in his imagery. He wrote:

Today it is not enough to study the works of God as they have been studied before, to admire only the world that our eyes see... Through the microscope we can see the infinitely varied microorganisms; more powerful images have never come to the imagination of the artist. Should we not take advantage of this immense arsenal of scientific data that they provide to us, to make richer and more varied our decorations, and to teach the truth contained in the verse of the Kingly Prophet: nimis profundae factae sunt cogitationes tuae Domine!?

Granda discerned his principles from intense study of art history, scripture, patristics, sacred liturgy, religious tradition and nature; his purpose was to apply the same principles to everything made in his workshops, regardless of historical style. In 1929, Rev. Demetrio Zurbitu Recalde, SJ wrote an essay describing the work of Talleres de Arte; according to him, the whole of Félix Granda's philosophy of art could be condensed into four words: dignity, religiosity, popularity and symbolism.

=== Dignity ===
In the late 19th and early 20th centuries, the quality of religious art declined, as artisanal traditions were replaced by industrial models of production. A sentimental style of mass-produced art, known as l'art Saint-Sulpice after a Parisian neighborhood famous for its religious goods stores, became the international standard of sacred art for the Roman Catholic Church. Zurbitu decried the prevalent artistic standards of his time:

It would be said that the artists had ceded their posts to the merchants; it would seem that the sculptor and the goldsmith had no concern for making a beautiful object to inspire piety, but rather for making an industrial model able to be multiplied by the dozen. The noble carving of marble and wood had been laid aside before the invasion of common plaster... And in this inundation of so many profane and vulgar objects, as wretched in form as in material, it would be useless to look for any sign of religious inspiration or even a recollection of the respect deserved by the noble destiny for which they were forged: honor to the House of God and participation in the most august sacrifice.

In contrast, the artwork produced at Talleres de Arte was made according to the highest standards of craftsmanship and material. The finest sacred metalwork produced at Talleres de Arte was the richest then produced in Spain, embellished with repoussage, set gemstones, carved ivory figures, vitreous enamels, and medallions, figurines and friezes worked in metal. But Granda also believed that humbler objects, produced for churches and monasteries without wealthy patrons, although lacking the splendor of richness must never lack the dignity of beauty. He wrote that it has more value that a man venerate a statue of Tanagra clay than a shapeless gold sculpture of decadent art. Granda preferred the direct carving of wood and stone to cast sculpture, believing that the easy methods of mass production resulted in a paganized sensuousness of form. The sculptures carved by his artisans were rather noble and sober, full of gravity and purity, without tragic poses or excessive gestures; the most proper to the serene beauty of religious art. Granda decried theatricality in religious art, applying to it Saint Jerome's condemnation of pompous rhetoric: Like a strumpet in the streets, it does not aim at instructing the public, but at winning their favor.

=== Religiosity ===
Félix Granda's second principle was religiosity; he wrote of his desire [t]o use art as we use language, to speak and to teach about Christ - not to teach about ourselves, and much less to boast of our luxury and vanity. As a devout priest, Granda's imagination was saturated with the images of Holy Scripture, which he described as an inexhausible treasury of motifs and figures. Zurbitu commented:

Scripture, doctrine, liturgy, tradition... are the perennial fonts from which spring his artistic ideas; the arsenal of his decorative themes. An altarpiece designed by Father Granda is not merely a set of architectural elements... The great altars built in Talleres de Arte are truly poetic, each developing an entire cycle of liturgical and theological ideas, full of doctrine and religiosity.

As an example, Zurbitu explained the symbolism of a monstrance that Granda designed for Nocturnal Adoration in Madrid. Figures of the Four and Twenty Elders who worship the Lamb in St. John's Apocalypse are placed around the base, separated into three groups; eight kneel, eight bow profoundly, and eight lift bowls of smoking incense according to their degree of spiritual perfection. Around the base of the monstrance's throne, men of the Old Testament prefiguring the Eucharistic sacrifice stand as caryatids. Abraham and Isaac walk to Mount Moriah, recalling the sacrifice of Calvary. Moses and a snakebitten Israelite represent salvation through the Holy Cross. Melchizedek presents his offering of bread and wine, and Isaiah and David proclaim their messianic prophecies.

Between them are sculpted warriors keeping watch. An inscription from identifies them: Behold threescore valiant ones of the most valiant of Israel surrounded the bed of Solomon. All holding swords, and most expert in war: every man's sword upon his thigh, because of fears in the night (Song of Songs 3.7). This is an allegory for Nocturnal Adoration of the Blessed Sacrament. Around the monstrance holding the Divine Solomon (Christ), the chosen men of Israel (Christians), armed with prayer and mortification, stand guard against the fears in the night (the traps that the Prince of Darkness has prepared in the shadows against the Church Militant).

On another monstrance, Granda fashioned the base in the likeness of the City of God, with twelve gates guarded by angels bearing the names of the twelve tribes. The monstrance stands on seven pillars that rise from this base, which recall the Proverb: Wisdom hath built herself a house, she hath hewn her out seven pillars (Proverbs 9.1).

=== Popularity ===
Demetrio Zurbitu wrote that the adornment of our temples cannot be an exclusive gift to a few aesthetes; it needs to be understood and savored by the believing masses. According to this spirit, Félix Granda insisted that the art produced at Talleres De Arte not be abstruse; that it be able to be understood and enjoyed by all worshippers, including the simple and unschooled. He employed forms that would translate into popular imagination; angels and demons, monsters and mythological creatures, regional flora and fauna, and men at their everyday labors.

=== Symbolism ===
The restoration of a symbolism to sacred art was a foundational principle of Talleres de Arte. In his initial instructions to Félix Granda in 1891, Archbishop Cos encouraged him to restore to the objects of divine worship the sacred symbolism that they have lost through the centuries. Ernest Grimaud DeCaux wrote of Father Granda:

A fervent admirer of the works of infinite beauty created by the artists, sculptors, carvers and metal-workers of the Middle Ages with their richness of symbolism, he laments that the Christian art of today hardly exists as a symbolical art. He ardently desires, therefore, to revive modern church art. He would see, in each sanctuary, sacred vessels symbolical in themselves and not merely dead objects in the hands of the officiant.

Commonly recurring symbols included fountains with seven streams representing the sacraments; the pious pelican giving blood to its chicks; the thirsting deer, representing souls longing for God; roses representing the Holy Wounds; the dove and the wolf, symbols of the pure soul and the perverse soul; the olive tree, symbol of peace; the peacock, symbol of immortality; the asp and the basilisk, representing sin; the Tree of Life; and the Good Shepherd. Granda himself wrote:

The Holy Bible, the hymns and prayers of the Church, offer to us an inexhaustible treasure of motifs and figures... The lines, the lights and reflections of gold, the luster and color of precious stones, the roses and the irises, the passion flowers and the daisies, the pomegranates, the grapevines, the leaves and the flowers, the fish and the birds, the waters and the clouds, the signs and the mysterious things that the sacred books suggest to us are the words with which we stammer the name of our hearts' beloved.

Zurbitu described a candlestick made at Talleres de Arte, with a base formed by three hooded men sleeping while mounted on the backs of monsters; the monsters represent vice, and the candle is a perennial symbol of Christ. The sleepers are those to whom St. Paul speaks: Rise thou that sleepest, and arise from the dead: and Christ shall enlighten thee (Ephesians 5.14).

== Major works ==
Under the direction of Félix Granda, Talleres de Arte designed and fabricated elaborate monstrances for the cathedrals of Leon, Lugo, Madrid, Oviedo and Burgos. An altarpiece built for the episcopal palace in Madrid, dedicated to the Virgin of Almudena, is now prominent in the city's new cathedral.

The crown for Our Lady of Guadalupe in Caceres was created at Talleres de Arte in 1928. The canonical coronation of was attended by King Alfonso XIII, the papal nuncio, and every cardinal of Spain. Other major works included the main altar in the Cistercian Abbey of San Isidro de Dueñas in Palencia, an altar in the Basilica del Pilar in Zaragoza, the altar of Nuestra Señora del Buen Consejo in the Church of San Isisdro in Madrid; and the murals in the apse of the seminary chapel in Madrid.

=== Church of St. Thomas — Avilés, Spain ===
In 1903, Félix Granda designed the interior furnishings for the new Church of St. Thomas of Canterbury in Avilés, designed by Luis Bellido Gonzalez.

The main altar has a mensa supported by three winged figures worked in bronze, holding shields which display the attributes of the Theological Virtues. Between them are marble bas-reliefs of the sacrifice of Abraham and of Melchizedek, expressing the double aspect of the Mass as Sacrifice and as Sacrament. The tabernacle is composed of two statues holding an ark; the men are Melchizedek, representing the natural law, and Aaron, representing the Mosaic law. The ark they support represents the Church. On its door is the Lamb of God, flanked by a dove, symbol of the pure soul, and a wolf, symbol of the perverse soul. At its corners stand figures of the four Evangelists, and on its other façades are depicted the Holy Trinity, the Last Supper and the Wedding at Cana, which St. Cyril of Jerusalem saw as an image of transubstantiation. Behind the tabernacle are five paintings; the central one of Mary, and the others showing scenes from the lives of St. Thomas of Canterbury and from the foundation of the Order of Mercy.

Side altars are dedicated to Our Lady of Mount Carmel, the Madre del Amor Hermoso, and St. Joseph. The pulpit is crowned by a griffin, representing the two-natured Christ. Winged monsters representing the vices tumble beneath it. The lower part of the pulpit's rostrum is decorated with four animals: a lion, a dog, a rooster and a ram, representing the necessary virtues of a good preacher: strength, fidelity, opportunity and courage.

=== Tomb of St. John of the Cross — Segovia, Spain ===
The sepulchral chapel of St. John of the Cross in Segovia was built in 1926 to commemorate the bicentennial of the saint's canonization, and includes an altarpiece, several statues and reliefs, mosaics, a tabernacle, and an elaborate coffin above the altar containing the torso and head of the saint.

=== Belen Jesuit Church — Havana, Cuba ===
The altarpiece of the Belen Church in Havana was built by Talleres de Arte in 1915. This Jesuit church is one of the only Gothic Revival buildings in Cuba. The altarpiece is also Gothic, with pinnacles, elaborate tracery and tiny hunky punks. The central image is a large statue of the Sacred Heart. A procession of figures representing the Patriarchs and Prophets stand on a plinth of marble and carry the Ark of the Covenant; above them statues of angels lift up the triumphant Christ Child. The lateral sections house statues of Jesuit saints.

=== Virgin of Covadonga — Covadonga, Spain ===
The triptychal throne and crown for the Virgin of Covadonga were made at Talleres de Arte in 1928. Demetrio Zurbitu described the work:

It has the fantastic richness of an oriental tale... when the doors of the throne are opened wide so that the image may be venerated, it seems like the opening of the pages of a great book written for the people: for Asturias and for Spain... Because everything here has been done for them, everything is within reach of their intelligence. They know the patriarchs, prophets and kings... who recall the lineage of the Virgin of Nazareth. They know also the two larger figures... who represent the church of Asturias; they are her patrons, St. Matthew and St. Eulalia. They know the animals scattered throughout the ornamental borders to be symbols of the land of Asturias, because they live... in her forests and mountains. And they know, most of all, the four representations of Asturian life - plowing the land, forging iron, fishing and mining - who, hammered in relief on the bottom part of the portals, are like men offering their daily struggles at the foot of the throne of their Queen.

On the pedestal of the statue's throne is carved the story of Pelayo, founder of the Kingdom of Asturias and hero of the Reconquest. On the throne itself, a concept of sublime Marian theology is expressed. The days of creation are represented by worlds budding from chaos, rays of light tearing the clouds, waters separating, vegetation blooming, beasts and fish and birds filling the earth. The Virgin who sits here is presented as greater than all creation, because the world and the things that fill it deserve to be no more than the throne of her majesty. This composition recalls the words which are read as the lesson at the Mass of the Immaculate Conception: I was set up from eternity, and of old before the earth was made. The depths were not as yet, and I was already conceived (Proverbs 8.22-30).

=== Sanctuary of la Gran Promesa — Valladolid, Spain ===
A 17th-century church in Valladolid that had formerly served as the chapel of the Jesuit College of St. Ambrose; the parish Church of St. Stephen, and the Expiatory Temple of the Sacred Heart was rededicated as the National Sanctuary of la Gran Promesa in 1941 to commemorate an especially Spanish devotion to the Sacred Heart propagated by the 18th century Jesuit Bernardo de Hoyos.

Talleres de Arte created the new interior artwork for the Sanctuary over the next decade, replacing altarpieces and shrines destroyed by fire in 1869. The main altarpiece includes a large sculpture of the Sacred Heart and reliefs of John the Apostle, Mary, the Last Supper and the Doubt of Thomas. Félix Granda also designed side altars dedicated to Christ the King of Martyrs and Our Lady of the Pillar, as well as reliefs of la Gran Promesa and the Adoration of the Magi; a processional float of Christ the King; the Pulpit; the Stations of the Cross; the tabernacle; the rood and the monstrance.
