= HMMS =

HMMS may refer to:

- Hartford Magnet Middle School, a former name of Hartford Magnet Trinity College Academy in Hartford, Connecticut
- Hidden Markov Model, a type of statistical model
- Hope Mills Middle School in Hope Mills, North Carolina
