= Genevieve L. Hutchinson =

American poet (1883–1974)

Genevieve Hutchinson
- Born: Genevieve L. Hutchinson; August 10, 1883; Brooklyn, New York
- Died: February 1974 (aged 90)
- Education: Hartford Public High School
- Spouse: Frederick W. Hutchinson (m. 1905–1974) (her death)

Genevieve L. Hutchinson (August 10, 1883 – February 1974) was a New England poet. She published several volumes including "Memory and other Poems" (1947) and "Substance" (1953). A member of the Springfield (MA) Poetry Society, she was Advisory Editor of their 1931 volume "Homespun, A Book of Verse". Her poem "To an Engraving of the Charter Oak" is in the collection of the Society of the Founders of Hartford, Connecticut State Library.

== Early life and family ==
Hutchinson was born in Brooklyn, New York. She graduated from Hartford Public High School in Hartford, Connecticut, in 1900 and the Lucy Webb Hayes Training School, Washington, D.C. as a Deaconess of the Methodist Church in 1904. She married Frederick W. Hutchinson June 28, 1905. Her parents and all of her siblings died before she was eighteen. All four of her sons also died in her lifetime. Through all this she carried a remarkable resilience which she shares in her poetry.

== Career ==
For 53 years starting in 1921, she was a popular hostess to Appalachian Trail hikers. Her home in Washington, Massachusetts, was a half mile from the Appalachian Trail's October Mountain Shelter. Her hospitality is noted and a picture included in the National Geographic Society volume "The Appalachian Trail". and again in David Emblidge's The Appalachian Trail Reader. Thomas McKone gives a first-person account of two days spent with her in Great Stories of Hiking the Appalachian Trail. In a 2009 article,Tales From the Appalachian Trail, Smithsonian Magazine titled her "The Good Samaritan".

== Bibliography ==
- Homespun, A Book of Verse (1931)
- Memory and other Poems (1947)
- Substance (1953)
