= University High School of Science and Engineering =

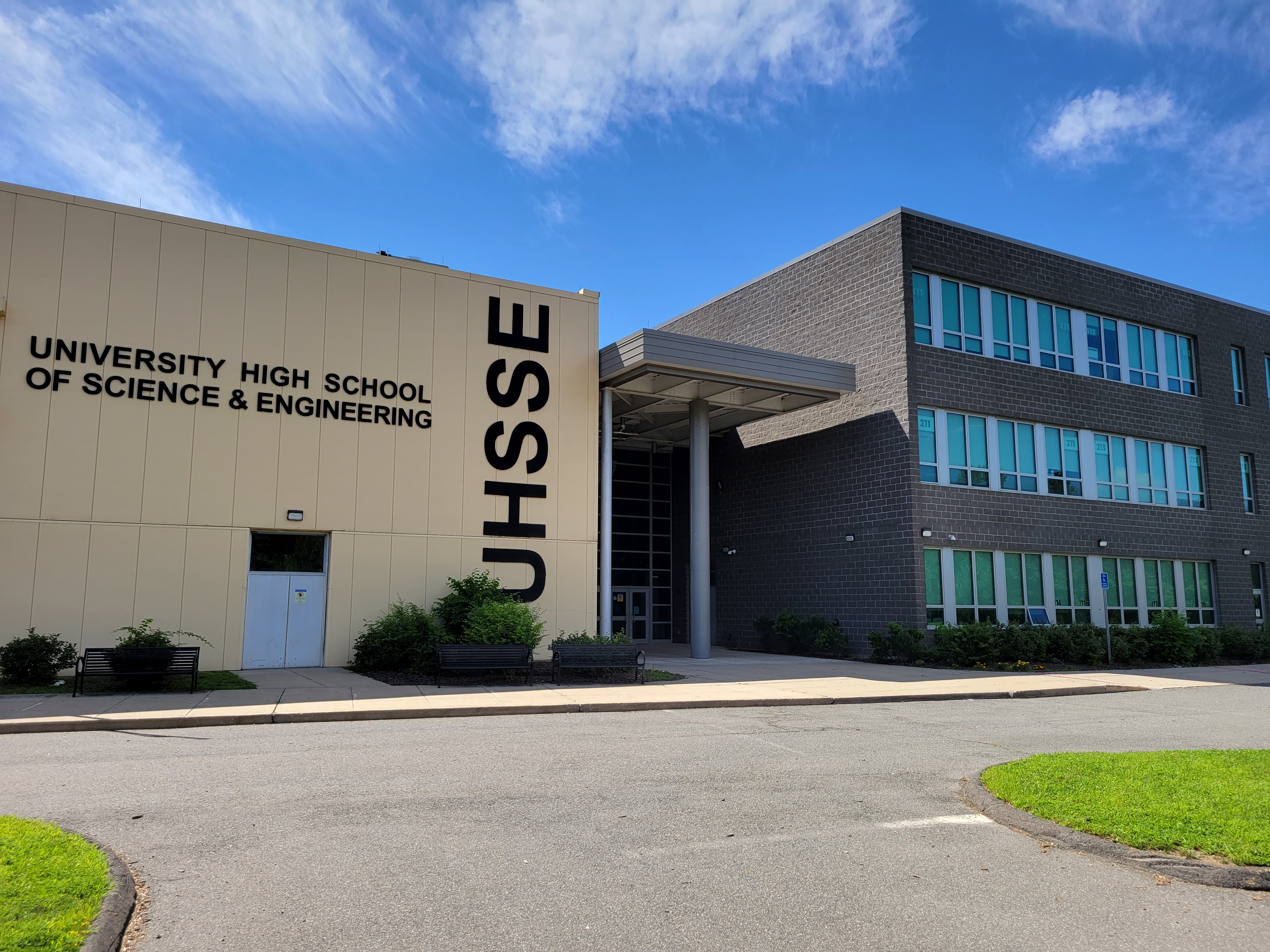
- University High School of Science and Engineering

Location
- 351 Mark Twain Drive; Hartford, Connecticut 06112; United States
- 41°47′49″N 72°42′34″W

Information
- Type: Public High School
- Established: 2004 (22 years ago)
- School district: Hartford Public Schools
- Category: Magnet STEM High School
- CEEB code: 070326
- Principal: Sean Tomany
- Faculty: ~45
- Teaching staff: 29.00 (FTE)
- Grades: 9-12
- Enrollment: 400 (2023–2024)
- Student to teacher ratio: 13.79
- Colors: Black and Red
- Athletics conference: Greater Hartford Conference
- Mascot: Hawks
- Nickname: UHSSE
- Newspaper: University Times
- Affiliation: University of Hartford
- Website: uhsse.org

University High School of Science and Engineering (UHSSE) is a Science, Technology, Engineering, and Math magnet high school located in Hartford, Connecticut. This public school was started in 2004, with a small body of faculty, headed by principal Dr Elizabeth Colli, and a freshman class of one hundred students.
