= Parish Hill High School =

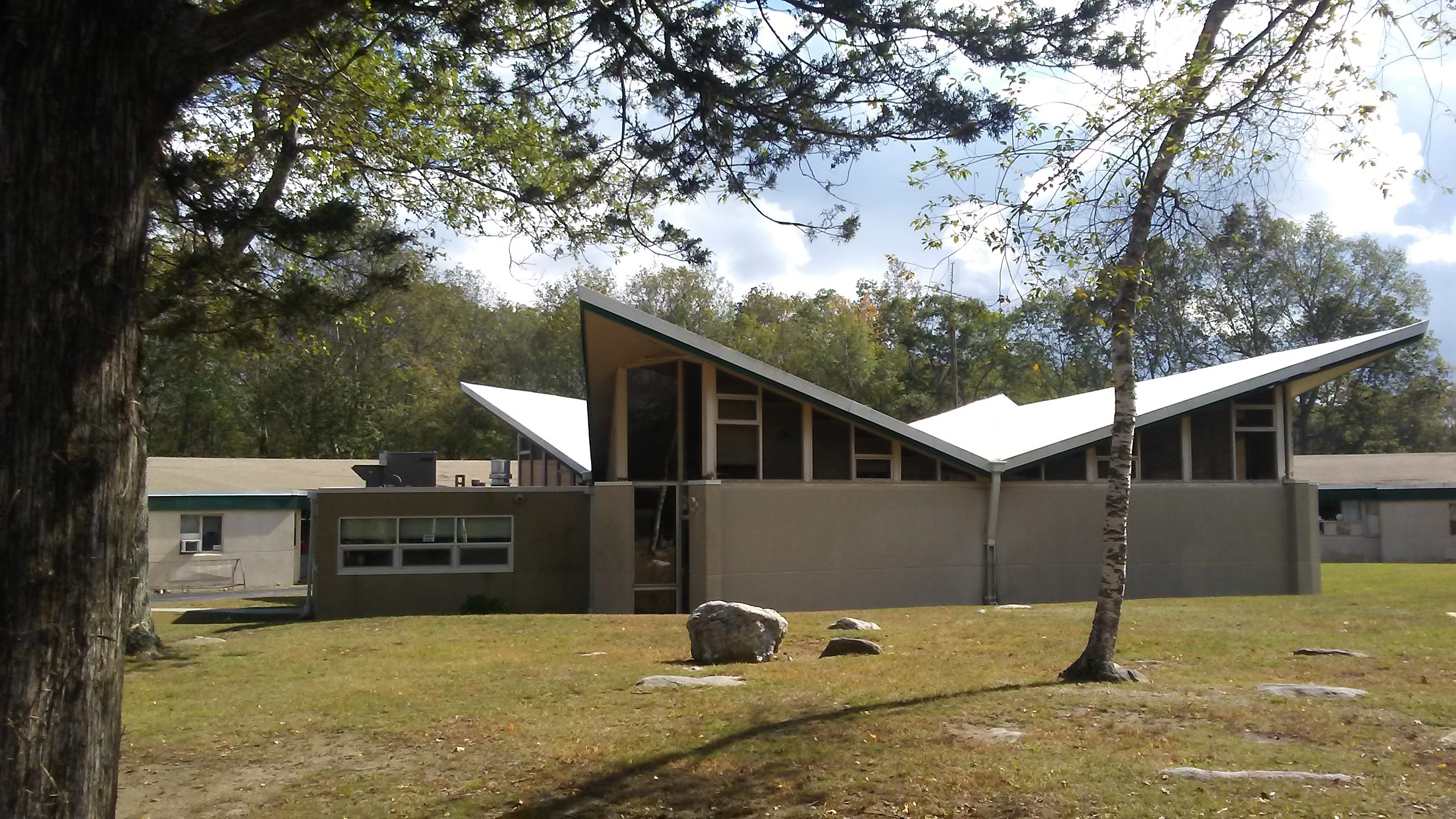

Location
- 304 Parish Hill Road; Chaplin, Connecticut 06235; United States; 41°44′46″N 72°06′32″W

Information
- Type: Public
- Established: 1967 (59 years ago)
- CEEB code: 070093
- Principal: Thomas McKenna
- Teaching staff: 23.90 (FTE)
- Grades: 7-12
- Enrollment: 205 (2023-2024)
- Student to teacher ratio: 8.58
- Colors: Green and White
- Athletics conference: Greater Hartford Conference
- Website: www.parishhill.org

Parish Hill High School is a regional secondary school and middle school in rural Chaplin, Connecticut.

== General information ==
Parish Hill Middle/High School teaches grades 7 to 12 to students from three local towns: Chaplin, Hampton and Scotland. The school is nicknamed the Hill, and the school mascot is the "Pirate." Parish Hill is Regional District #11.

== Demographics ==
In 2006–2007, the racial makeup of the school was:

- White: 92%
- African American: 1.2%
- Native American: 0.9%
- Asian: 0.6%
- Hispanic or Latino of any race: 3.1%

== After-school activities ==
Parish Hill offers many after-school activities, including Diversity Club, middle and high school drama clubs, five competing vocal choirs, various instrumental ensembles, and middle and high school newspaper clubs. The school also recently underwent a reconstruction to its video program which now houses state of the art video production equipment and broadcasts news to the school and to the surrounding three towns on Channel 17.

The school offers baseball, softball, basketball, cross country, and soccer for middle school and high school students, and golf and track & field for high school students.

== Attempt to dissolve school district ==
In previous years, due to poor test scores and high per pupil costs, the three participating towns of Scotland, Chaplin, and Hampton explored the options of withdrawing from, dissolving, or re-envisioning the high school.

There have been several attempts by the three towns (Hampton, Scotland, and Chaplin) to dissolve Regional District #11, in which all three towns must vote yes to dissolve. On November 12, 2009, the most recent referendum was narrowly defeated, where Hampton and Scotland voted to dissolve, and Chaplin voted to not.

Parish Hill underwent an evaluation by a NEASC (New England Association of Schools and Colleges) visiting team and is a fully credited school. The NEASC put Parish Hill on probation in 2006, due to overcrowding and low test scores. However, in the 2010 to 2011 school year, Parish Hill student test scores showed a marked increase. The school is getting ready for the NEASC's decennial inspection in October and November 2016.
