= Greater Hartford Conference =

High school athletic conference in Connecticut, US

- Conference: CIAC
- Founded: 2013
- No. of teams: 14
- Region: Hartford County; Windham County
- Official website: www.crecschools.org/about/crec_athletics/c_r_a_l_webpage

Locations
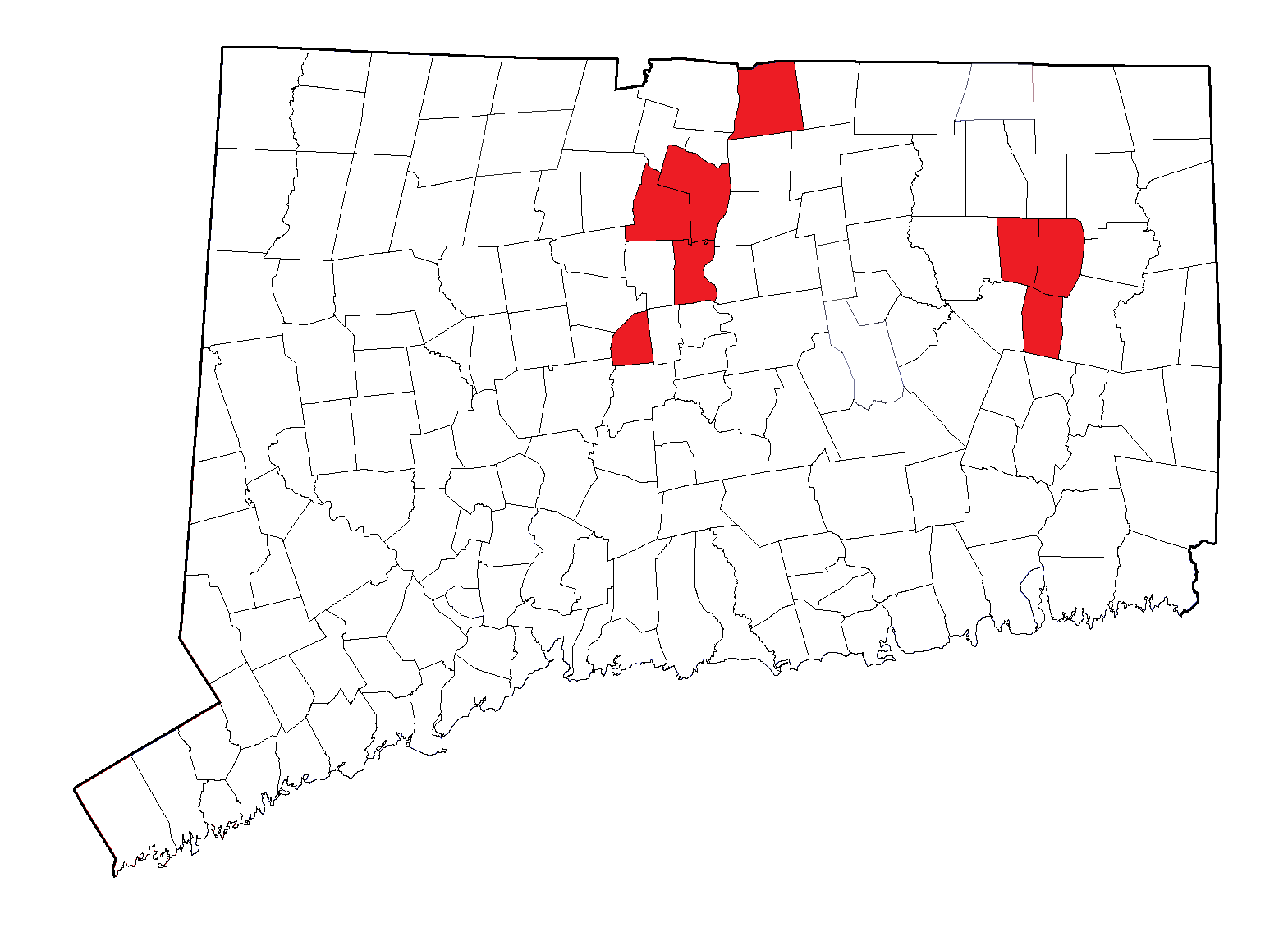

The Greater Heartford Conference (GHC), formerly the Capitol Region Athletic League (CRAL) is a high school athletic conference in Connecticut affiliated with the CIAC. Founded in 2013, its members are mainly located in Greater Hartford and consists of former members of the defunct Constitution State Conference.

The CRAL announced that it was changing the name of the conference to the Greater Hartford Conference for the 2025-26 academic year.

== Membership ==
School	Location	Nickname	Colors
Academy of Aerospace and Engineering (Aerospace)	Windsor, Connecticut	Jets	
Academy of Computer Science and Engineering (Comp Sci)	Enfield, Connecticut	Eagles	
Academy of International Studies (International)	Bloomfield, Connecticut	Dragons	
Academy of Science and Innovation (Innovation)	New Britain, Connecticut	Ravens	
Achievement First Hartford High School	Hartford, Connecticut	Royals	
Bulkeley High School	Hartford, Connecticut	Bulldogs	
Capital Preparatory Magnet School (Capital Prep)	Hartford, Connecticut	Trailblazers	
Classical Magnet School (Classical)	Hartford, Connecticut	Gladiators	
Hartford Magnet Trinity College Academy (HMTCA)	Hartford, Connecticut	Phoenix	
Hartford Public High School	Hartford, Connecticut	Owls	
Parish Hill High School	Chaplin, Connecticut	Pirates	
Sport and Medical Sciances Academy (SMSA)	Hartford, Connecticut	Tigers	
University High School of Science and Engineering (University)	Hartford, Connecticut	Hawks	
Weaver High School	Hartford, Connecticut	Beavers	
