= Greater Hartford Academy of Mathematics and Science =

The Greater Hartford Academy of Math and Science & The Academy of Aerospace and Engineering
- External view of the GHAMAS main building on the Learning Corridor in Hartford

Location
- 1101 Kennedy Road; Windsor, Connecticut 06095; United States
- Coordinates: 41°53′43″N 72°39′19″W

Information
- Type: High school and middle school
- Established: 1999 (27 years ago)
- CEEB code: 070276
- Principal: Delores M. Bolton (middle school) (2011-2015); Paul Brenton (high school) (2012-2017); Adam Johnson (middle school & high school) (2017-present)
- Enrollment: >400
- Colors: Purple, Gray, Black
- Athletics conference: Greater Hartford Conference
- Mascot: Aerospace Jets
- Affiliations: NCSSSMST
- Website: aaen.crecschools.org

The Greater Hartford Academy of Mathematics And Science (also known as GHAMAS) is a high school in Windsor, Connecticut, United States. The building houses a grade 6-12 program, The Academy of Aerospace and Engineering (also known as AAE, Aerospace, and Aerospace and Engineering) is a magnet high school originally located in Hartford, CT and was a half-day program.

GHAMAS is run by the Capitol Region Education Council (CREC), one of 6 Regional Educational Service Centers (RESC) in Connecticut.

Trinity College has been involved in some of the projects with GHAMAS, such as the Brain Bee, a neuroscience competition. Hartford Hospital is involved in school activities as well.

The Academy of Aerospace and Engineering was built as GHAMAS in 1999. Labs at the academy include the Robotics, Physics, Earth Science, Biology, Cell Culture, Greenhouse & Potting, Biochemistry, Chemistry, Special Instrumentation, and Engineering Labs. There are also several smaller student laboratories which are used by students to conduct independent research through a senior design and research course called Capstone.

== See also ==
Greater Hartford Academy of the Arts
