= Isaac William Stuart =

American writer and politician (1809–1861)

Member of the Connecticut Senate from the 1st district
- In office 1845–1846

Personal details
- Born: 1809 New Haven, Connecticut, U.S.
- Died: October 2, 1861 (aged 51–52) Hartford, Connecticut, U.S.
- Resting place: Zion's Hill Cemetery
- Party: Whig
- Spouse: Caroline Bulkley
- Parent: Moses Stuart (father)
- Education: Yale College
- Occupation: Writer; historian; educator; politician

Isaac William Stuart (1809 – October 2, 1861), also known as Scaeva, was an American writer, historian and politician from Connecticut.

== Early life ==
Isaac William Stuart was born in 1809 in New Haven, Connecticut, to Abigail (née Clark) and Moses Stuart. His father was pastor of the Centre Church in New Haven. Stuart graduated from Yale College with a bachelor's degree in 1828.

== Career ==
Following graduation, Stuart taught at Hopkins Grammar School in Hartford. When he was not teaching he studied hieroglyphics and Asian literature.

In 1830, Stuart published a translation, with notes, of Jean-Gabriel-Honoré Greppo's Essay on the Hieroglyphic System of Champollion (Boston, 1830, 12mo.). He was elected professor of Greek and Latin at the College of South Carolina and moved to Columbia, South Carolina. He published in 1837, an edition with notes of the Oedipus Tyrannus of Sophocles (New York, 12mo.).

Stuart returned to Hartford and was proprietor of the Wyllys Estate on which was standing the famous Charter Oak. He was a supporter of Henry Clay and held conservative political opinions about slavery. He was a Whig. In 1845, he was elected to the Connecticut State Senate to represent district 1, defeating Leonard R. Welles. He was re-elected in 1846.

Stuart published in 1856, a Life of Nathan Hale, the Martyr Spy of the Revolution (Hartford, 1856, 8vo.), a volume of local historical sketches entitled Hartford in the Olden Time by "Scaeva" (Hartford, 1853, 8vo.), and an elaborate Life of Governor Jonathan Trumbull (Boston, 1857, 8vo. pp 700.). He was a contributor to the Hartford Courant and signed some of his writings as "Scaeva". He was judge advocate of The Putnam Phalanx.

== Personal life ==
Stuart married Caroline Bulkely. He died on October 2, 1861, aged 52, in Hartford. He was buried in Zion's Hill Cemetery.
