= Reuben Ewing =

American baseball player (1899–1970)

- Outfielder
- Born: Reuben Cohen; November 30, 1899; Odessa, Russian Empire
- Died: October 5, 1970 (aged 70); West Hartford, Connecticut, U.S.
- Batted: Right Threw: Right

MLB debut
- June 21, 1921, for the St. Louis Cardinals

Last MLB appearance
- June 27, 1921, for the St. Louis Cardinals

MLB statistics
- Games played: 3
- At bats: 1
- Hits: 0
- Stats at Baseball Reference

Teams
- St. Louis Cardinals (1921)

Reuben Ewing (born Reuben Cohen; November 30, 1899 – October 5, 1970) was an American professional baseball player for the St. Louis Cardinals.

== Early life ==
Ewing was born in Odessa, Russian Empire to Ukrainian-Jewish parents and emigrated with them to the United States in 1904. As a child he showed brilliant athletic talent, a foreshadow of his later achievement of making the major leagues. In order to avoid antisemitism Cohen became "Ewing". He later attended Hartford High School and Lebanon Valley College.

== Professional career ==
In 1921, while still a student at Lebanon Valley, Reuben received a contract with the St. Louis Cardinals. His short career featured no highlights and lasted only three games and spanned only seven days from June 21 to June 27.

In the only plate appearance of his professional career, he was struck out by future Hall of Fame pitcher Eppa Rixey while pinch hitting for pitcher Tink Riviere.
