= Stewardess School =

1986 film by Ken Blancato

- VHS cover
- Directed by: Ken Blancato
- Written by: Ken Blancato
- Produced by: Phil Feldman
- Starring: Brett Cullen; Don Most; Judy Landers; Mary Cadorette; Alan Rosenberg; Wendie Jo Sperber; Rob Paulsen; Tim Hoskins
- Cinematography: Fred J. Koenekamp
- Edited by: Lou Lombardo; Kenneth C. Paonessa
- Music by: Robert Folk
- Distributed by: Columbia Pictures
- Release date: August 1986
- Running time: 89 minutes
- Country: United States
- Language: English
- Budget: $8 million (estimated)
- Box office: $136,158

Stewardess School is a 1986 American comedy film directed by Ken Blancato and starring Brett Cullen and Don Most. It is also known for being one of voice veteran Rob Paulsen's very few onscreen roles, and up until the early 2000s, one of the most played films on the American cable channel Comedy Central.

== Plot ==
Pilots Philo Henderson and George Bunkle are about to land a plane, only for Philo to accidentally knock out his contact lenses, causing the plane to malfunction and crash into a Los Angeles skyscraper. The destruction is then revealed to be a simulator and the duo was taking an exam in pilot school, causing the two to be attrited for unsatisfactory performance. Unemployed and out of options, they enroll in Weidermeyer Academy, one of the top stewardess schools in the country. George and Philo get put in a group full of misfits, including a lady wrestler (Wanda Polanski) whose fiancé got cold feet, a frumpy overweight girl (Jolean Winters), an ex-prostitute (Sugar Dubois) whose probation officer arranged for her to enroll in Weidermeyer as part of a work-release program, a gay man (Larry Falkwell), and an extremely clumsy woman (Kelly Johnson). The group has standard classes about emergencies, etiquette, and antiterrorism, which they work through. Also as part of a test is a full-sized replica of an airplane with people to wait on, and some difficult people are selected such as a bratty little kid, a group of middle aged drunks, and a surly ex-NFL player who refuses George's orders not to smoke. The group starts to gel together, with George learning to start applying himself to a career and Philo finding common ground with the "jinx girl" due to his similar eye problems.

However, by happenstance, the group incurs the ire of Miss Grummet, the school dean and a matronly martinet, who believes all stewardesses to be attractive "flying waitresses", not tough, nerdy, chubby, promiscuous, and certainly not stewards like George, Philo or Larry (their homosexual classmate). When the entire group graduates Weidermeyer, she resorts to her secondary plan as she is responsible for jobs. When everyone graduates, stewardesses are given jobs with reputable airlines such as Delta, Pan Am, or TWA, while this entire group has been detailed to Stromboli Air. The group is introduced to their owner, Mr. Stromboli, a kindly immigrant whose airline is on the verge of chapter 11 bankruptcy unless his next flight from LAX to Atlanta can prove reputable. The group agrees to work together to make it a profitable flight when they hear rumors of an FAA evaluator on board. Still not content, Grummet has gotten herself assigned to the position of purser, saying she will oversee them and if Stromboli goes bankrupt, they are doomed to unemployment. The flight is a mixture of ordinary businessmen and a blind people's convention, which starts to run into trouble when an unexpected rain squall hits and a "mad bomber" (in an ironic sense) calmly and quietly sets his plan into motion, drugging the drink of the man sitting next to him with a powerful hallucinogenic, then taking advantage of the turmoil to plant the bomb under a passenger's seat, sneak a gas pellet into the captain's cabin to knock out the pilot, then to the cargo hold to jump out into the sky.

Things go from bad to worse as one of the blind men, in an attempt to find the restroom, accidentally lets himself into the captain's cabin and hits the instrument panel with his white cane.

The plane is brought under control by Philo with the help of autopilot, but as his contacts were stepped on and broken earlier, he cannot see well at all. He directs staff to look for missing passengers and they discover the mad bomber is no longer on the plane. Philo correctly suspects he planted a bomb and jumped out of the cargo door, so directs the team to look for it.

Kelly discovers the bomb and presents it to the team. The back of the plane is evacuated, then George and Jolean try to disable it before running away when realizing it will detonate. It explodes, blowing a hole in fuselage, causing Jolean to be sucked back. The width of her backside was sufficient to plug the hole perfectly and the plane remains in flight. In the cockpit, Philo is struggling to land the plane as he explains to Kelly he has a rare condition called binocular vision. Kelly holds a pair of binoculars the wrong way, which corrects Philo's vision and he is able to pilot the plane again.

The film ends with a court case where the fate of the stewardesses and airline are on trial.

The undercover evaluator onboard turned out to be the passenger beside the mad bomber who was drugged and received a blow job from Sugar to calm him down. He states that it was the best flight of his life and the case is dismissed resulting in celebrations all round.

== Cast ==
- Brett Cullen as Philo Henderson
- Don Most as George Bunkle
- Mary Cadorette as Kelly Johnson
- Judy Landers as "Sugar" Dubois
- Sandahl Bergman as Wanda Polanski
- Wendie Jo Sperber as Jolean Winters
- Julia Montgomery as Pimmie Polk
- Dennis Burkley as "Snake"
- Corinne Bohrer as Cindy Adams
- Rob Paulsen as Larry Falkwell
- Vito Scotti as Carl Stromboli
- William Bogert as Roger Weidermeyer
- Vicki Frederick as Miss Grummet
- Alan Rosenberg as "Mad Bomber"
- Sherman Hemsley as Mr. Buttersworth
- Tim Hoskins as Boy
- Richard Erdman as Attorney
