= Joseph-Alexander Martigny =

Joseph-Alexander Martigny (born at Sauverny, Ain, in 1808; died at Belley, 19 August 1880) was a French archaeologist and Canon of Belley.

== Biography ==
He studied at the minor seminary of Belley and became a professor there in 1832. He was curate later at Cressy and afterwards a parish priest of Arbignieu.

Encouraged by his bishop and Jean-Gabriel-Honoré Greppo, who promoted a revival of religious archaeology in France, he devoted his leisure hours to the pursuit of that science. He was appointed curé of Bâgé-le-Châtel and made an honorary canon in 1849. From that time dates his acquaintance with J. B. de Rossi, to whom he became closely attached by reason of his work in the domain of Christian archaeology.

== Works ==
Though living in a retired locality he collected the matter for his Dictionnaire des antiquités chrétiennes, which appeared in 1865; the first work of its kind, giving evidence of the vast erudition, too vast perhaps, for the articles so varied in matter and character, are all from the pen of this learned country priest. This work was soon taken up again by Smith in England and Kraus in Germany.

Martigny published a corrected edition of his dictionary in 1877. The publisher, Hachette, had intended the work to be part of the Dictionnaire des antiquitiés grecques and romaines of Charles Victor Daremberg and Edmond Saglio, but its importance made it an independent work. Martigny published also a French edition of the Bulletino de archaeologia of de Rossi. His writings include various articles in Annales de l'Académie de Mâcon, 1851, ssq., etc.
