= Greater Hartford Academy of the Arts =

CREC Greater Hartford Academy of the Arts Half Day
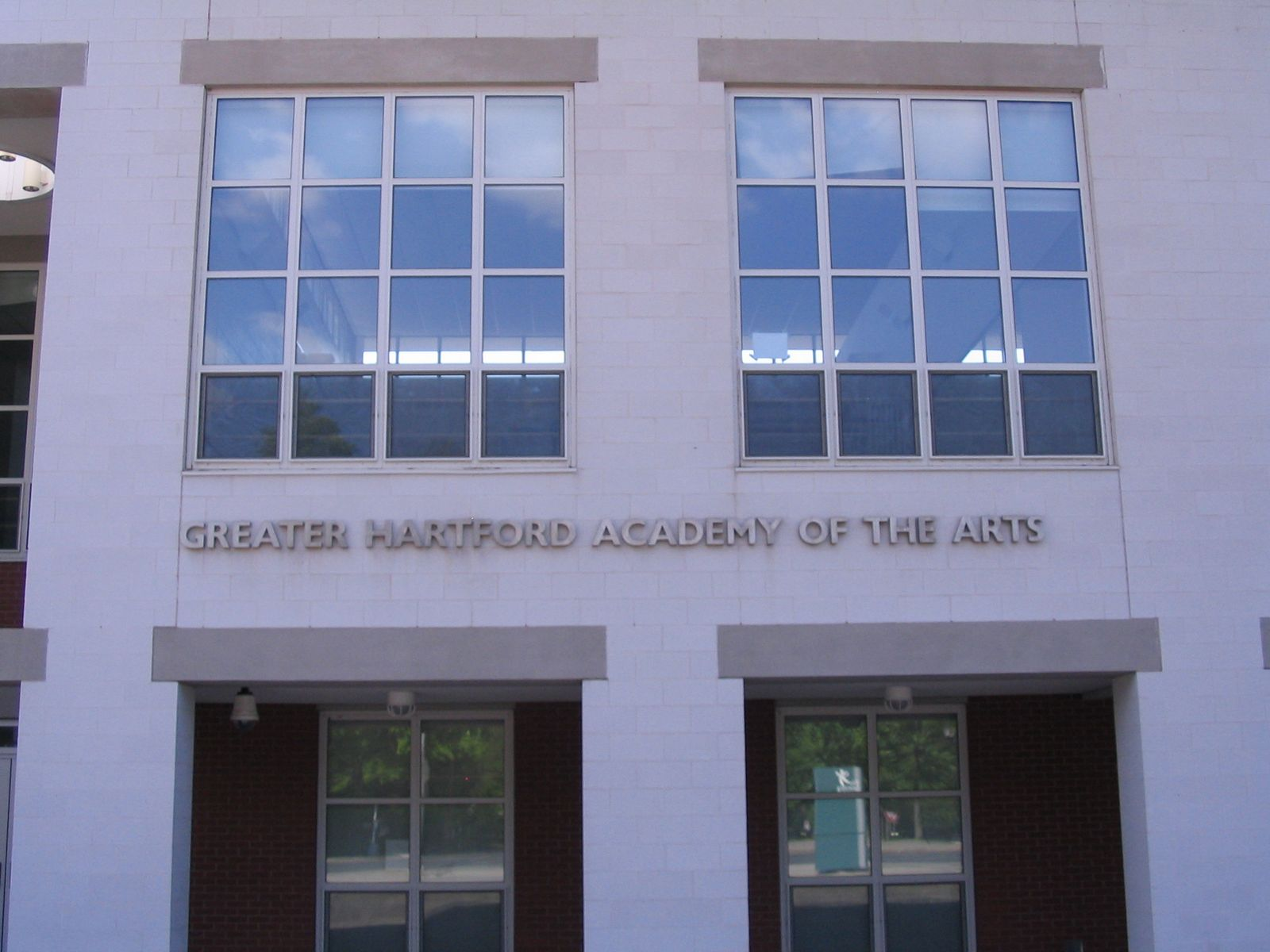

Location
- 15 Vernon Street; Hartford, Connecticut 06106; United States; 41°45′04″N 72°41′03″W

Information
- Type: Magnet High School
- Established: 1985 (41 years ago)
- CEEB code: 070275
- Head of school: Kim Stroud
- Grades: 9-12
- Website: ghaahd.crecschools.org

The CREC Greater Hartford Academy of the Arts Half Day (known formerly as the Greater Hartford Academy of the Arts) is an integrated magnet arts high school serving students in Hartford, Connecticut and its surrounding towns. It is one of four schools located on the 16-acre (65,000 m^{2}) campus of The Learning Corridor.

The Capital Region Education Council (CREC) has managed the school since it was established in 1985. Students attend their home district’s school for classes in the morning and then attend the Academy in the afternoon for arts education.
