= Capitol Region Education Council =

Educational Service Center in the Capitol region of Connecticut

- Founded: 1966
- Purpose: Open Choice Magnet School District
- Location: Hartford, Connecticut
- Region served: Greater Hartford Region of Connecticut
- Services: K-12 Education and Professional Development
- Key people: Executive Director Desi Nesmith
- Website: https://www.crec.org/

Capitol Region Education Council or CREC ( /krɛk/) provides programs and services to meet the educational needs of children in the Capitol Region of Connecticut (Hartford and 35 surrounding towns). It is one of six Regional Educational Service Centers (RESCs) established under Connecticut General Statute 10-66 a-n, which permits local boards of education to establish a RESC as a “public educational authority” for the purpose of “cooperative action to furnish programs and services.”

CREC is supported by local, state, federal and private funds. Local school districts become members of CREC with an annual fee of 20 cents per pupil. Each CREC program is discretely funded with a budget that completely supports its operation and contributes a proportionate share to CREC’s overall management and development.

CREC provides professional development and consultation services for school districts, municipalities, corporations, and non-profit organizations.

The CREC Foundation, a tax-exempt charitable 501 (c)(3) organization, was established in 2005 to support the Capitol Region Education Council its members, programs, and schools. The Foundation is governed by a board of directors. By design, the majority of CREC Foundation directors also serve on the Capitol Region Education Council.

In order to assist the CT State Department of Education meet the benchmarks of the Sheff Settlement Agreement, CREC operates 16 interdistrict magnet schools in the Greater Hartford region and the Hartford Region Open Choice Program. CREC Magnet Schools are tuition free for families. Each school has a specific theme that drives the development of curriculum and the delivery of instruction. Themes include STEM (science, technology, engineering, and mathematics), arts and culture, international studies, Montessori, Reggio Emilia, aerospace and engineering, ecology, public safety, museum studies, and medical professions & teacher preparation. CREC Schools enroll more than 7,000 students in Pre-K Age 3 through Grade 12. The Hartford Region Open Choice Program is open to students in the Greater Hartford area. Hartford students can apply to Open Choice for the opportunity to attend public schools in suburban towns. Suburban students can apply to Open Choice for the opportunity to attend Hartford public schools. Open Choice is no cost to families. The goals of the Open Choice program are to improve academic achievement; reduce racial, ethnic and economic isolation;and provide a choice of educational programs for children. Currently, more than 1,300 students participate in Open Choice.

Students are admitted to all CREC Magnet Schools and the Open Choice program through a lottery that is regulated, administered, and supervised by the Connecticut State Department of Education’s Regional School Choice Office in compliance with the Sheff v. O'Neill decree and Settlement Agreement.

CREC Schools also operates programs and schools for students with special educational needs, including birth to three programming, Family Enrichment Services, the Farmington Valley Diagnostic Center, Integrated Program Models, the John J. Allison Polaris Center, River Street School, Soundbridge, and Health Services.

== Schools Managed by CREC ==
CREC Manages sixteen interdistrict magnet schools throughout Greater Hartford.

=== Pre-Schools and Elementary Schools ===
- Academy of Aerospace & Engineering Elementary School (Pre K - 5)
- Discovery Academy (Pre K - 5)
- Glastonbury-East Hartford Elementary Magnet School (Pre K - 5)
- CREC Ana Grace Academy of the Arts Elementary Magnet School (Pre K - 5)
- Academy of International Studies Elementary School (Pre K - 5)
- Montessori Magnet School (Pre K - 6)
- Museum Academy (Pre K - 5)
- Reggio Magnet School of the Arts (Pre K - 5)
- University of Hartford Magnet School (Pre K - 5)

=== Magnet Middle and High Schools ===
- Academy of Aerospace & Engineering (6 - 12)
- Academy of Computer Science and Engineering (9 - 12)
- Academy of International Studies (6 - 12)
- Academy of Science and Innovation (6 - 12)
- Greater Hartford Academy of Mathematics and Science (Half-Day Program, 9-12)
- Greater Hartford Academy of the Arts (9 - 12)
- Two Rivers Magnet Middle School (6 - 8)

== Student Services Schools ==
- Farmington Valley Diagnostic Center (Simsbury)
- John J. Allison, Jr. Polaris Center (East Hartford)
- River Street School (Windsor)
- River Street Autism Program at Birkin (Windsor and Hartford)
- Soundbridge (Wethersfield)
