= Christina Kishimoto =

American education administrator

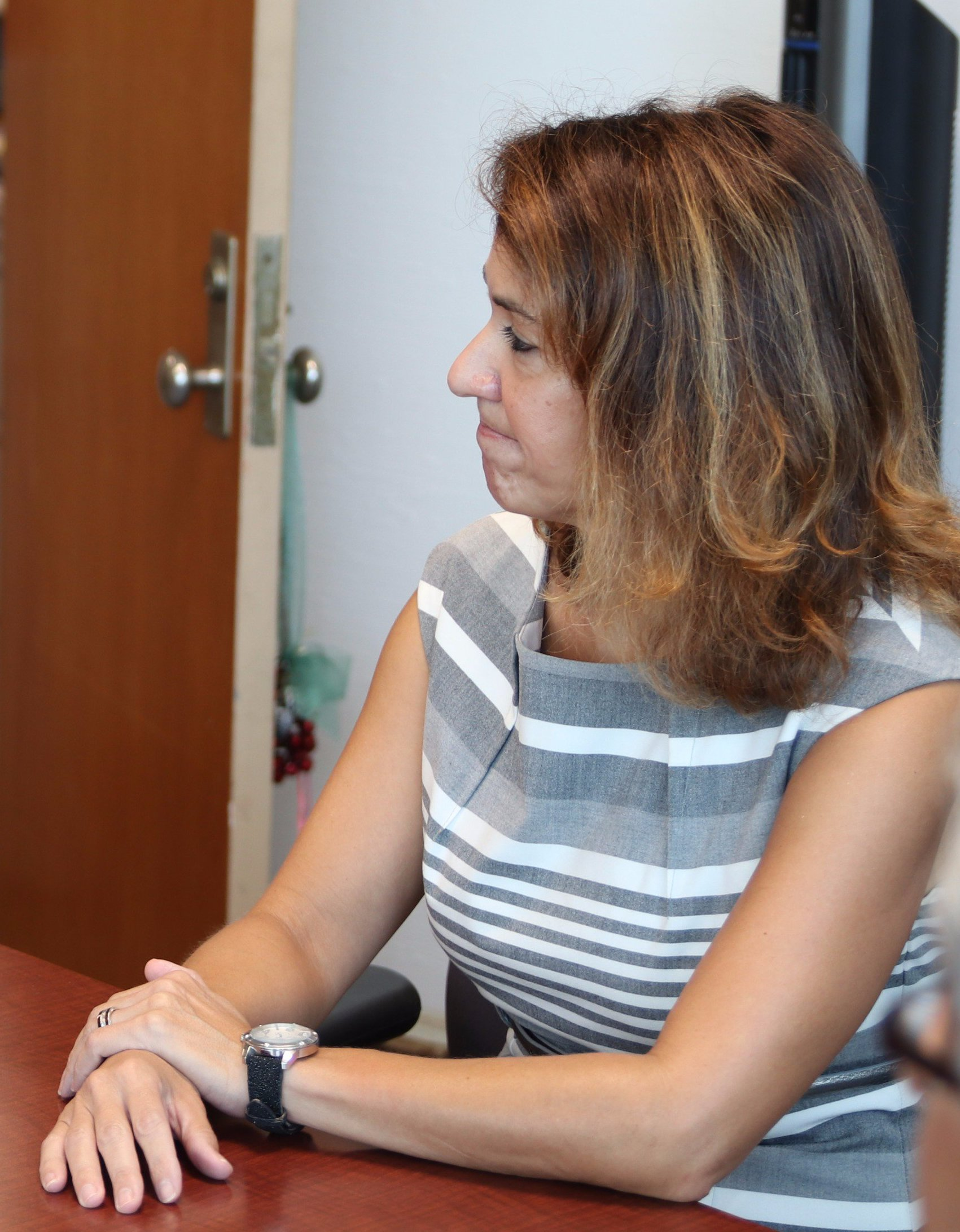
- Born: New York City, New York, United States
- Education: Barnard College
- Alma mater: Columbia University Teachers College
- Children: 1

Christina Kishimoto is an American education administrator. She served as superintendent of the Hawai'i Department of Education from 2017 through 2021. She also served as superintendent in Hartford, Connecticut, and Gilbert, Arizona.

== Early life and education ==
Kishimoto was born in the Bronx in New York. She has four siblings.

She was inspired to pursue a career in public education by her childhood teachers. She was part of the A Better Chance program, via which she moved from the Bronx to attend school in Wellesley, Massachusetts, as a sophomore.

She attended Barnard College, and earned a PhD from Columbia University Teachers College in education administration.

== Career ==
Kishimoto is the former superintendent and chief executive officer of Gilbert Public Schools in Gilbert, Arizona. She was also a superintendent in Hartford, Connecticut.

Kishimoto became superintendent of the Hawai'i Department of Education in August 2017, with a salary of $240,000. In early March 2021, she stepped down as superintendent after complaints about her job performance during the COVID-19 pandemic. She was succeeded by Waipahu High School Principal Keith Hayashi.

== Personal life ==
Kishimoto is married, and has one daughter. She lives in the Ala Moana neighborhood of Honolulu, Hawaii.
