= Hartford Magnet Trinity College Academy =

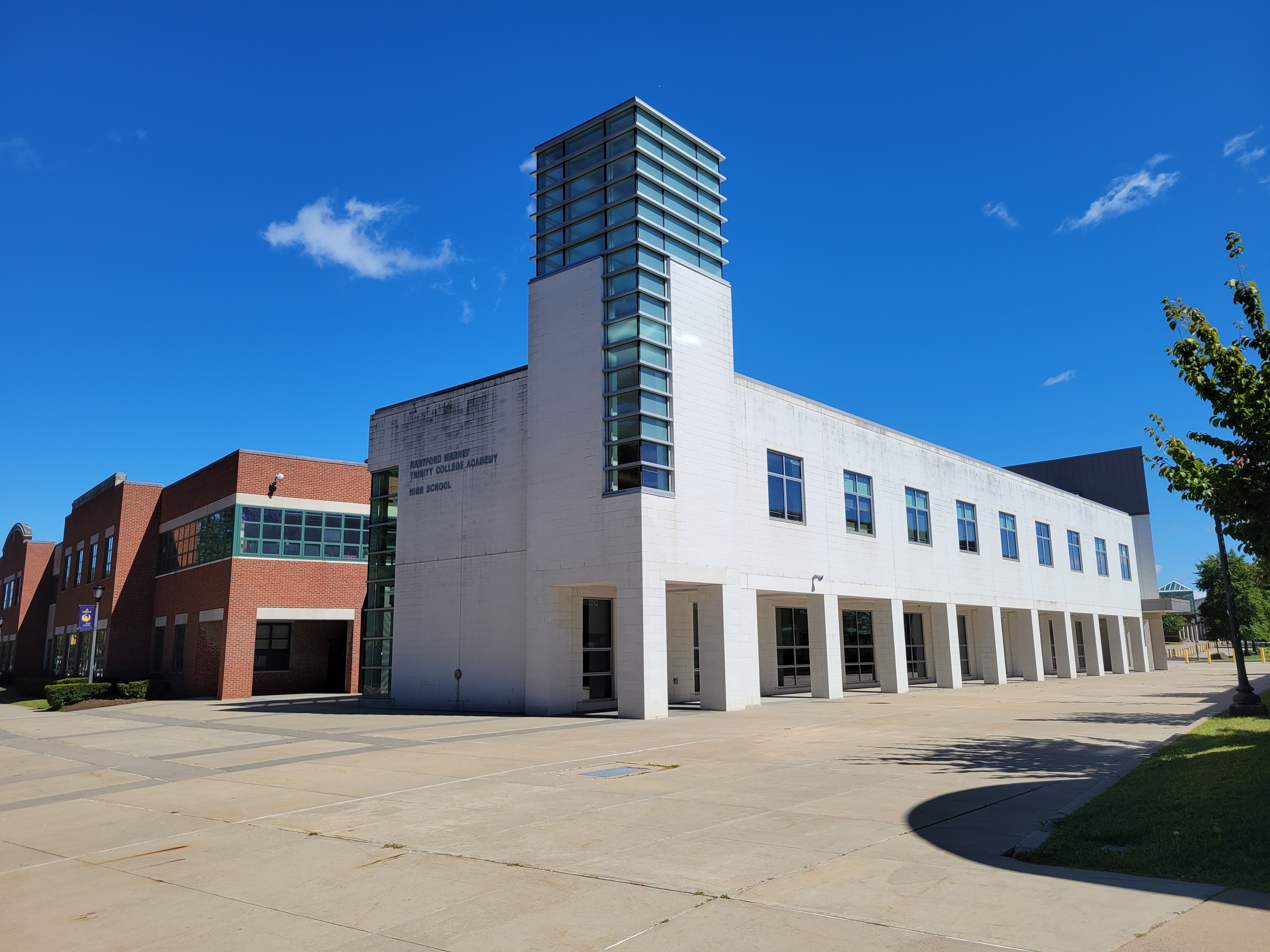
- Hartford Magnet Trinity College Academy High School

Location
- 1400 Broad Street; Hartford, Connecticut 06106; United States; 41°45′06″N 72°41′12″W

Information
- Type: Magnet college academy school
- Established: 1999 (27 years ago)
- CEEB code: 070274
- Principal: Richard Quinn
- Grades: 6-12
- Enrollment: 1,057 (2018-2019)
- Colors: Navy and Gold
- Athletics conference: Greater Hartford Conference
- Team name: Phoenix
- Website: www.hartfordschools.org/o/hmtca

Hartford Magnet Trinity College Academy (HMTCA) (formerly Hartford Magnet Middle School, HMMS) is a magnet school in Hartford, Connecticut which was named a Blue Ribbon School in 2006 and operates as part of the Hartford Public Schools. Starting July 1, 2011, HMMS was renamed Hartford Magnet Trinity College Academy and added a 9th grade, continuing to add a grade each year up to 12th grade. The school operates in partnership with Trinity College.

== Awards and recognition ==
During the 2006–07 school year, and has continued that tradition through 2024, Hartford Magnet Trinity College Academy was recognized with the Blue Ribbon School Award of Excellence by the United States Department of Education, the highest award an American school can receive. "The Blue Ribbon award is given only to schools that reach the top 10 percent of their state's testing scores over several years or show significant gains in student achievement."

== Controversy ==
In 2022, the Hartford Public Schools finance department performed an audit of the school's financial records from the fiscal year of 2021-2022. The audit discovered that the school's "Student Activity Fund" had a deficit of $42,000 which was likely caused by transactions being recorded with missing information and incorrect descriptions. Funds were allegedly misused for teacher retirement parties and various staff appreciation incentives against the fund's policies.
