= Hartford Public Schools (Connecticut) =

School district in Hartford, Connecticut, United States

Location
- Hartford, Connecticut United States

District information
- Type: Public
- Grades: PK-12
- Superintendent: Dr. Andraé Townsel
- Schools: 46 (26 non-magnet, 20 magnet)
- Budget: $423,189,594
- NCES District ID: 0901920

Students and staff
- Students: 20,000+
- Staff: 3,000+

Other information
- Website: www.hartfordschools.org

Hartford Public Schools (HPS) is a school district serving the city of Hartford, Connecticut, United States. It is the largest public school district in Connecticut, serving 46 magnet and non-magnet schools in the district. The graduation rate for Hartford public schools in 2016–2017 was 68.8%, lower than the state average of 87.9%.

== History ==
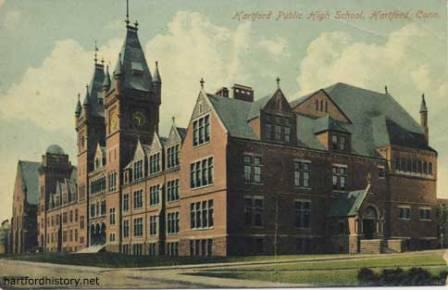
Original Hartford Public High School

Hartford Public High School, the second oldest public high school in the United States, was founded by Rev. Thomas Hooker in the 17th century as a school that would prepare men for Puritan ministry. It was funded in large part by the will of Governor Edward Hopkins in 1657. Hartford Public High School, as it is known now, was officially opened in 1847.

Bulkeley High, Capital Prep, and Weaver High School were a few of the many high schools that were opened in Hartford in the early 20th century. Due to the advent of war during the early 20th century, Hartford's population boomed, which led to the opening of many public high schools during the mid-century.

The Sheff v. O'Neill Connecticut Supreme Court decision in 1996 concluded that school districting based on town boundary lines was unconstitutional and led to a large disparity in racial and ethnic minorities in Hartford Public High Schools. In 1997, state legislature passed An Act Enhancing Educational Choices and Opportunities, which created inter-district magnet schools to preserve equal educational opportunity with racial and ethnic balance in Hartford.

The magnet school program in Hartford has grown to include 20 magnet schools in the county, which can be attended by students across the state of Connecticut.

== Leadership ==
=== Past superintendents ===
- Dr. Andraé Townsel (2025–present)
- Dr. Leslie Torres-Rodriguez (2017–2025)
- Beth Schiavino-Narvaez (2014–2016)
- Christina Kishimoto (2011–2014)
- Dr. Steven J. Adamowski (2006–2011)
- Robert Henry (2002–2006)
- Anthony S. Amato (1999–2002)

== Schools ==
| School name | Education level | School type | Grades offered | Operator |
|---|---|---|---|---|
| Alfred E. Burr Middle School | Middle school | District | 6-8 | Hartford Public Schools |
| Betances Early Learning Lab | Elementary school | Magnet | PK-3 | Hartford Public Schools |
| Betances STEM Magnet | Elementary school | Magnet | 5–8 | Hartford Public Schools |
| Breakthrough Magnet School, North | Elementary school | Magnet | PK-6 | Hartford Public Schools |
| Breakthrough Magnet School, South | Elementary school | Magnet | PK-8 | Hartford Public Schools |
| Bulkeley High School | Middle & high school | District | 9–12 | Hartford Public Schools |
| Burns Latino Studies Academy | Elementary school | District | PK-8 | Hartford Public Schools |
| Capital Preparatory Magnet | PK-12 school | Magnet | PK-12 | Hartford Public Schools |
| Classical Magnet | Middle & high school | Magnet | 9–12 | Hartford Public Schools |
| Dr. James H Naylor/CCSU Leadership Academy | Elementary school | District | PK-8 | Hartford Public Schools |
| Dr. Joseph S. Renzulli Gifted and Talented Academy | Other options & opportunities | District | 4–8 | Hartford Public Schools |
| Dwight-Bellizzi Dual Language Academy | Elementary school | District | PK-8 | Hartford Public Schools |
| Environmental Sciences Magnet School at Mary Hooker | Elementary school | Magnet | PK-8 | Hartford Public Schools |
| Expeditionary Learning Academy at Moylan School | Elementary school | District open choice | PK-5 | Hartford Public Schools |
| Global Communications Academy | PK-12 school | District Open Choice | K-8 | Hartford Public Schools |
| Great Path Academy at Manchester Community College | Middle & high school | Magnet | 9–12 | Hartford Public Schools |
| Hartford Magnet Trinity College Academy | Middle & high school | Magnet | 6–12 | Hartford Public Schools |
| Hartford Pre-K Magnet | Elementary school | Magnet | PK | Hartford Public Schools |
| Hartford Public High School | Middle & high school | District open choice | 9–12 | Hartford Public Schools |
| Kennelly School | Elementary school | District | PK-8 | Hartford Public Schools |
| Kinsella Magnet School, High School | Middle & high school | Magnet | 9–12 | Hartford Public Schools |
| Kinsella Magnet School, PK-8 | Elementary school | Magnet | PK-8 | Hartford Public Schools |
| Martin Luther King Jr. Middle School | Middle & high school | District | 6-8 | Hartford Public Schools |
| McDonough Middle School | Middle & high school | District | 6–8 | Hartford Public Schools |
| MD Fox School | Elementary school | District | PK-5 | Hartford Public Schools |
| Milner Middle School | Middle & high school | District | 6–12 | Hartford Public Schools |
| Montessori Magnet Moylan | Elementary school | Magnet | PK-6 | Hartford Public Schools |
| Montessori Magnet School at Annie Fisher | Elementary school | Magnet | PK-8 | Hartford Public Schools |
| OPPortunity High School | Other Options & Opportunities | District Partnership | 9–12 | Hartford Public Schools |
| Parkville Community School | Elementary school | District | PK-5 | Hartford Public Schools |
| Pathways Academy of Technology and Design | Middle & high school | Magnet | 9–12 | Hartford Public Schools |
| Rawson Elementary | Elementary school | District | PK-5 | Hartford Public Schools |
| S.A.N.D. School | Elementary school | District | K-5 | Hartford Public Schools |
| Sanchez Elementary | Elementary school | District | PK-5 | Hartford Public Schools |
| Sport and Medical Sciences Academy | Middle & high school | Magnet | 6–12 | Hartford Public Schools |
| STEM Magnet at Annie Fisher | Elementary school | Magnet | K-8 | Hartford Public Schools |
| University High School of Science and Engineering | Middle & high school | Magnet | 9–12 | Hartford Public Schools |
| Weaver High School | Middle & high school | District | 9-12 | Hartford Public Schools |
| Webster MicroSociety Magnet | Elementary school | Magnet | PK-8 | Hartford Public Schools |
| West Middle | Elementary school | District | K-8 | Hartford Public Schools |
| Wish Museum School | Elementary school | District | PK-8 | Hartford Public Schools |

== Demographics ==
Over 20,000 students attend Hartford Public Schools. 76% are Hartford residents, while 24% are residents of 78 other Connecticut towns. In the 2018–2019 school year, non-magnet Hartford public school students were 30% African-American, 64% Hispanic, 3% White, 2% Asian, and 1% other populations. Magnet Hartford public schools were 31% African-American, 38% Hispanic, 20% White, 7% Asian, and 4% other populations.

In 2018–2019, 97 languages were spoken by Hartford public school students. Out of the 97 languages, 58% spoke English, 33% spoke Spanish, 1% spoke Serbo-Croatian, 1% spoke Karen, 1% spoke Portuguese, and 6% of students spoke 92 other languages.

Out of the 2018–2019 population, 18% of students were special education students. 66% of special education students were male, while 34% were female. 72% of specially educated students were enrolled in non-magnet schools, 7% were in magnet schools, 9% were in 19 in-district programs, and 12% were in 61 outplacement programs.

== See also ==
- List of the oldest public high schools in the United States
