= The Putnam Phalanx =

US historical military unit

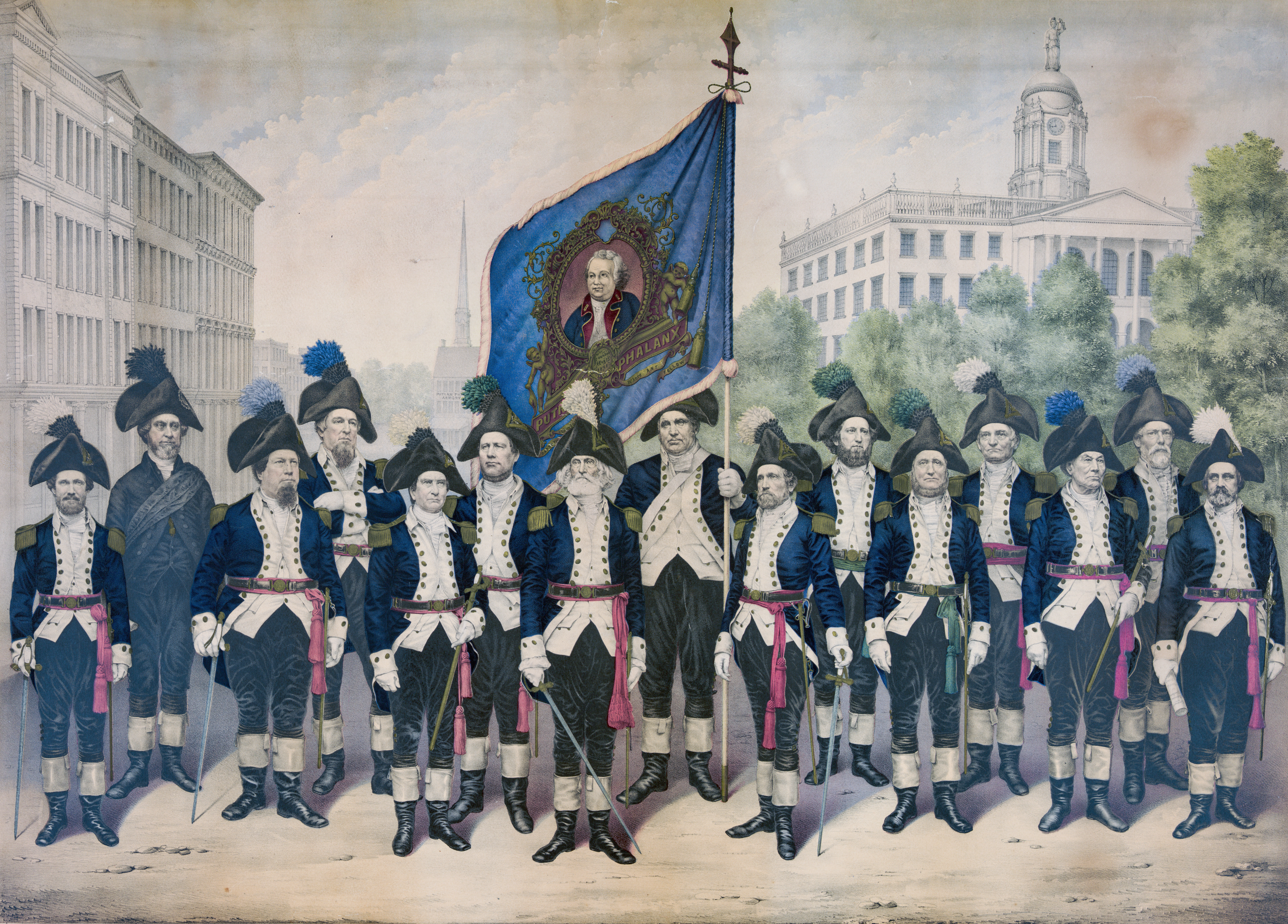
Staff and officers of the Putnam Phalanx as originally constituted

The Putnam Phalanx of Hartford, Connecticut, United States, was a quasi-military unit, originally organized as ceremonial honor guard in 1858, it functioned as a social club and was incorporated on March 9, 1877. The Putnam Phalanx was merged into the Connecticut National Guard in 1931, and by 2007 was "essentially defunct".

== History ==
The Putnam Phalanx were originally organized on August 15, 1858 for the purpose of escorting Thomas H. Seymour on his return from Hartford after a long career in public service, culminating as the Minister to Russia. From this original group, the Putnam Phalanx was formed.

Named in honor of Major General Israel Putnam of the Continental Army under George Washington, the Putnam Phalanx took on the purpose of keeping alive traditions, beliefs and ideals of their namesake. The sworn purpose of the organization as stated in their constitution was

"to provide a medium for patriotic expression, by perpetuating the ceremonies, customs and traditions of patriots in arms at the time of the American Revolution, by commemorating the events and heros of that period; by encouraging patriotism among the people, to the end that domestic tranquility be insured and provisions made for the common defense."

The organization was a social-patriotic-military organization, although it had the outward appearance of a military unit, such as the wearing of military uniforms, use of military language and address, drilling and marching; it never fought as a unit of the armed forces, and had no battle history as a unit. However individual members had personal military experience, but with other military organizations, for example during the American Civil War. During its existence it was a social organisation, having as members Governors, generals, state and town officials. Wearing uniforms based on that of the Continental Army, it was in part a historical reenactment society, its members providing ceremonial guards for commemorations of battles and on state occasions.

In 1931 the Putnam Phalanx was merged into the Connecticut National Guard, becoming the "Putnam Phalanx Veterans Corps"; by 2007 it was "essentially defunct".

== Notable members ==
- Isaac William Stuart (1809–1861), writer and member of the Connecticut State Senate

== See also ==
- Governor's Foot Guard
- Company of Pikemen and Musketeers- a British quasi-military unit that wears historical uniforms and bears historical weapons, as a ceremonial bodyguard to the Lord Mayor of London
