= Academy of International Studies (Bloomfield, Connecticut) =

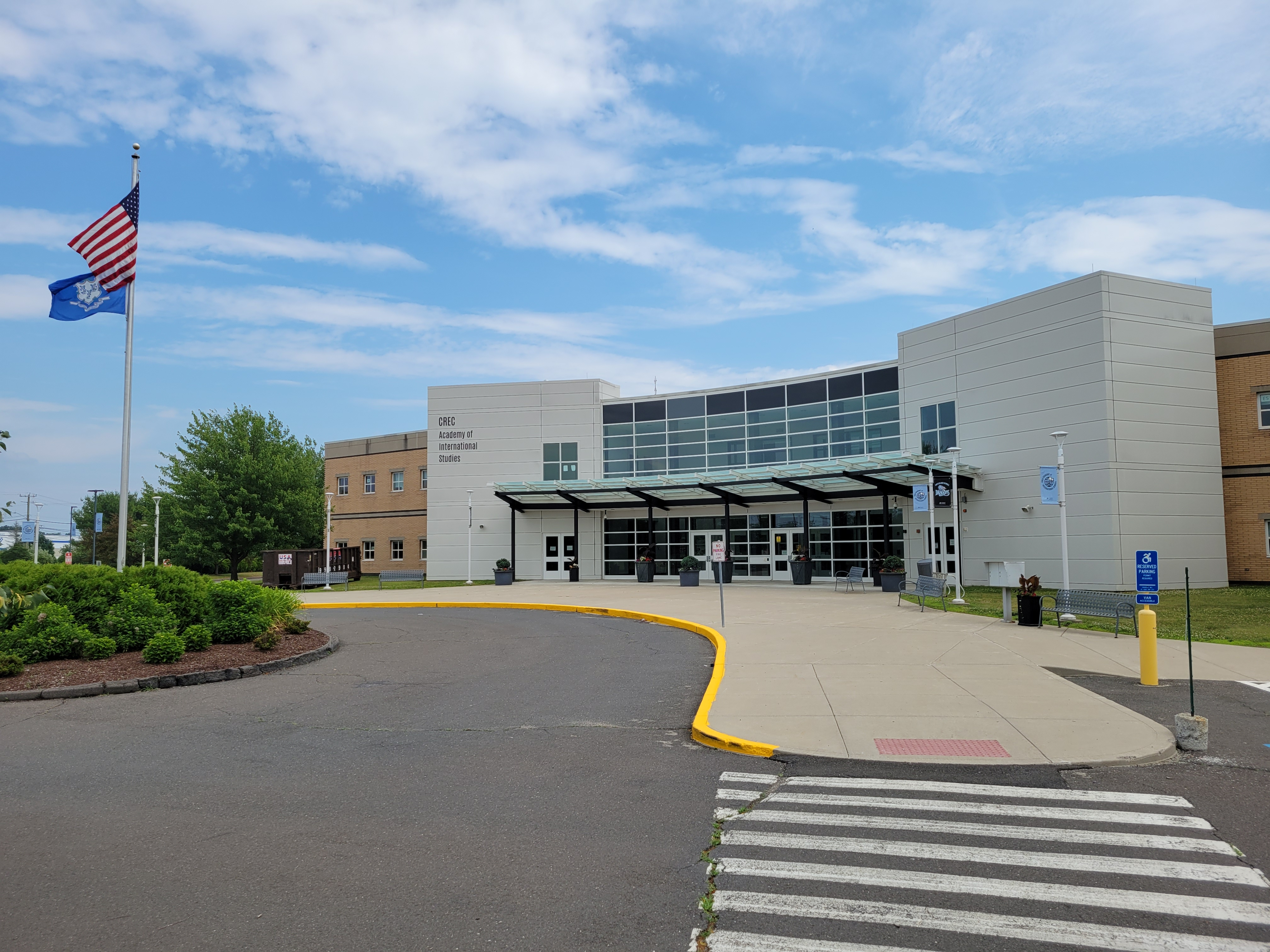
- CREC Academy of International Studies (formerly Metropolitan Learning Center)

Location
- 1551 Blue Hills Avenue; Bloomfield, Connecticut 06002; United States; 41°52′15″N 72°43′36″W

Information
- Type: Magnet middle and high school
- Established: 1998 (28 years ago)
- School district: Capitol Region Education Council
- CEEB code: 070034
- Principal: Yesenia Hernandez
- Grades: 6–12
- Enrollment: 741
- Athletics conference: Greater Hartford Conference
- Website: inter.crecschools.org

The Academy of International Studies, formerly the Metropolitan Learning Center (MLC) is a magnet school that is based in Bloomfield, Connecticut. The school is part of the Capitol Region Education Council.

== History ==
The school was founded in 1996. Educators from CREC and the original participating communities of Bloomfield, East Windsor, Hartford, Windsor and Windsor Locks planned this global studies school. In 1997, the Connecticut State Legislature approved the appropriation of $32 million for the construction of a grades 6–12 Metropolitan Learning Center, a School for Global and International Studies, which opened in September 1998 in the old Bloomfield Junior High School Building. Enfield later joined the program in 2000. In the fall of 2001, with grades 6–9, the school was moved to its new building at 1551 Blue Hills Avenue Bloomfield. It now serves nearly 700 students in grades 6–12 from Bloomfield, Hartford, Enfield, Windsor, East Windsor, and Windsor Locks. Public Act 07-3 allowed students in non-participating districts to apply for a seat in an inter-district magnet school if seats are available. With this legislative change, students in any town are allowed to apply to MLC and may be granted a seat.

== Facility ==
The MLC building was completed in the fall of 2001, after two years of construction.

Designed to feel like a corporate workplace, the main building is made up of two stories, each containing four grade-area pods. The library (MediaCenter) is centered on the first floor among the four pods, along with the main and guidance offices.

The art, television studio, and tech rooms are centered among the pods on the second floor. The secondary building is home to the cafeteria, gymnasium, exercise room, auditorium (Conference Area), and the music department.

All rooms have wireless internet connections to work with the students' laptops, and all classrooms have Smartboards that work with the teachers' desktop computers.

== Sports ==
The school had begun offering a small number of athletic programs in the year 2013 and has since expanded its offerings, now providing a variety of both middle and high school sports, coordinated by the Capital Region Education Council's Interscholastic Athletic Program.

As per 2016 the school offers:

- High School Varsity Boys Soccer
- High School Girls Soccer
- High School Varsity Girls Volleyball
- High School JV Girls Volleyball
- High School Boys Cross Country
- High School Girls Cross Country
- Middle School Boys Soccer
- Middle School Girls Soccer
- Middle School Girls Volleyball
- Middle School Boys Cross Country
- Middle School Girls Cross Country
- Middle School Boys Basketball
- Middle School Girls Basketball
- High School Varsity Boys Basketball
- High School Varsity Girls Basketball
- High School JV Boys Basketball
- High School JV Girls Basketball
- High School Boys Indoor Track
- High School Girls Indoor Track
- Middle School Boys Basketball
- Middle School Girls Basketball
- Middle School Boys Indoor Track
- Middle School Girls Indoor Track
- Football (Freshman, JV, Varsity)*

* Joint Program between Metropolitan Learning Center, Two-Rivers Magnet High School, & Academy of Aerospace & Engineering
