= Jean-Gabriel-Honoré Greppo =

French canon

Jean-Gabriel-Honoré Greppo (3 September 1788, in Lyon – 22 September 1863, in Belley) was a French canon remembered for his research in the fields of archaeology and Oriental studies. He was related to canon Jean-Baptiste Greppo (1712–1767), known for his archaeological investigations of ancient Lyon.

== Biography ==
He received his education in Lyon, then attended the seminary of St. Sulpice in Paris. From 1807 he was associated with the seminary of St. Irenaeus of Lyon, and afterwards became a parish priest in Saint-Just. In 1823 he was appointed vicaire général of Belley.

He was a correspondent member of the Académie des Inscriptions et Belles-Lettres (1840–1863) and the Académie des sciences, belles-lettres et arts de Savoie (1834).

== Literary works (selection) ==
- Dissertation sur les laraires de l'empereur Sévère Alexandre, 1834 – Dissertation on the lararia of Emperor Alexander Severus.
- Esquisse de l'histoire de la monnaie chez les Hébreux, 1837 – Sketch on the history of money among the Hebrews.
- Essai sur le système hiéroglyphique de M. Champollion le jeune et sur les avantages qu'il offre à la critique sacrée, 1829 – Essay on the hieroglyphic system of Jean-François Champollion, etc.
- Notes historiques, biographiques, archéologiques et littéraires concernant les premiers siècles chrétiens, 1841 – Historical notes, biographical, literary and archaeological, in regards to the early Christian centuries.
- Etudes archéologiques sur les eaux thermales ou minérales de la Gaule à l'époque romaine, 1846 – Archaeological studies on the thermal/mineral waters of Gaul during the Roman era.
