= Hartford Public High School =

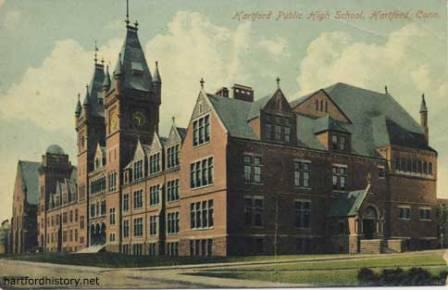
- The nineteenth-century schoolhouse, since demolished, as it appeared on a 1911 postcard

Location
- 55 Forest Street; Hartford, Hartford County, Connecticut 06105; United States; 41°45′54″N 72°42′04″W

Information
- Former names: Latin School; Hartford Grammar School
- Type: Public school
- Established: 1638 (388 years ago)
- CEEB code: 070265
- Grades: 9–12
- Enrollment: 698 (2024-2025)
- Colors: Blue and white
- Athletics conference: Greater Hartford Conference
- Team name: Owls
- Website: www.hartfordschools.org/o/hphs/

Hartford Public High School, in Hartford, Connecticut, was founded in 1638. It is the second-oldest public secondary school in the United States, after the Boston Latin School. It is part of the Hartford Public Schools district.

The school was originally known as the Latin School. It used the name Hartford Grammar School beginning in the 18th century and opened to women and became the Hartford Public High School in 1847.

== Notable alumni ==
- Michael Adams, class of 1981, NBA All-Star and coach
- Morgan Bulkeley, governor of Connecticut, U.S. senator
- Marcus Camby, class of 1993, NBA player 1996–2013
- Hong Yen Chang, class of 1878, Chinese Educational Mission participant
- Franklin Chang-Diaz, class of 1969, NASA astronaut
- Katharine Seymour Day, historical preservationist
- Monk Dubiel, class of 1936, former MLB player
- Reuben Ewing (born Reuben Cohen), Major League Baseball player
- Edward M. Gallaudet, class of 1851, president of Gallaudet University in Washington, D.C., 1864–1910
- Eddie Griffin, class of 1962, All American basketball player, led Hartford Public to two New England titles, 1961 and 1962
- George Kirgo, class of 1943, screenwriter, author, humorist, and founding member of the National Film Preservation Board of the Library of Congress
- Elyse Knox, class of 1935, actress, spouse of Tom Harmon and mother of Mark Harmon
- Nick Koback, class of 1953, former MLB player
- Pete Naktenis, class of 1932, former MLB player
- Bob Nash, class of 1968, basketball player
- Frederick E. Olmsted, class of 1891, forester, one of the founders of American forestry and the National Forest
- Les Payne, class of 1958, Pulitzer Prize winner, journalist
- Eddie A. Perez, class of 1976, mayor of Hartford, 2001–2010
- Lindy Remigino, class of 1949, Olympic track athlete, coached Hartford Public to 31 state championships in track
- John Trumbull Robinson, US Attorney for the district of Connecticut
- Harold Rome, class of 1923, songwriter
- George Dudley Seymour, class of 1878, historian, attorney, planner
- Allan K. Smith, U.S. attorney for the district of Connecticut
- Hilda Crosby Standish, medical doctor and birth control pioneer
- Anthony Dumond Stanley, 19th century professor of mathematics at Yale University
- Marlon Starling, class of 1976, WBC and WBA Welterweight World Champion
- Griffin Alexander Stedman, Union Army colonel in the Civil War
- Tony Todd, class of 1972, actor
- Kang Tongbi, Chinese feminist
- Annie Eliot Trumbull, class of 1876, writer
- Laura Wheeler Waring, class of 1906, college teacher and artist of the Harlem Renaissance
- Henry Williams, class of 1887, starred at Yale, coached Minnesota Gophers football, 131-36, voted into College Football Hall of Fame in 1951
- Mary Rogers Williams, class of 1875, artist
- George Woodend, class of 1936, Major League Baseball player

== See also ==
- List of the oldest public high schools in the United States
