= National Register of Historic Places listings in Fairfield County, Connecticut =

Location of Fairfield County in Connecticut

This is intended to be a complete list of the properties and districts on the National Register of Historic Places in Fairfield County, Connecticut, United States. The locations of National Register properties and districts for which the latitude and longitude coordinates are included below may be seen in an online map.

There are 300 properties and districts listed on the National Register in the county, including 9 National Historic Landmarks. Of these, 57 are located in the city of Bridgeport and covered separately in National Register of Historic Places listings in Bridgeport, Connecticut. Thirty-four are covered in National Register of Historic Places listings in Greenwich, Connecticut and another 36 are covered in National Register of Historic Places listings in Stamford, Connecticut. There are 175 properties and districts which are entirely outside those three cities or which span outside, and which are covered here in this list (Merritt Parkway is listed here as well as in the Greenwich and Stamford lists).

All of the National Historic Landmarks are listed here or in Greenwich, Stamford, and Bridgeport. Forty-six of these here or in Greenwich or Stamford are historic districts.

Architecture addressed in the NRHP listings is quite varied. Of special interest is an unusual concentration of modern or International Style houses in New Canaan, Connecticut, designed by the "Harvard Five" architects, including: Landis Gores House, the Richard and Geraldine Hodgson House, the Philip Johnson Glass House, and the Noyes House.

There are numerous bridges included in the listings. Seven are moveable bridges, including the Saugatuck River Bridge from 1884, the oldest moveable bridge in the state, and the Washington Bridge which carries U.S. 1 into New Haven County. Five are moveable railway bridges: the Mianus River Railroad Bridge, the Norwalk River Railroad Bridge, the Saugatuck River Railroad Bridge, the Pequonnock River Railroad Bridge (in Bridgeport), and the Housatonic River Railroad Bridge. One bridge is part of a dam and hydroelectric plant complex, the Stevenson Dam Hydroelectric Plant. Five bridges bring roads across shorter crossings: the Perry Avenue Bridge in Norwalk; the Main Street Bridge and the Turn-of-River Bridge in Stamford; the Riverside Avenue Bridge in Greenwich; and the picturesque Pine Creek Park Bridge in Fairfield. Also there are numerous bridges that are included in the Merritt Parkway listing, out of 69 original bridges of the parkway. (This includes both bridges carrying the Merritt Parkway, and bridges crossing it). Other bridges are contributing structures within historic districts, such as the Pulaski Street Bridge within the South End Historic District of Stamford, and a concrete arch bridge from 1941 in the Aspetuck Historic District.

There are nine NRHP-listed lighthouses (including two in Bridgeport).

Seven sites are listed partially or wholly for their association with the marches of French General Rochambeau's troops through the county on their way to and from victory at Yorktown, Virginia, in 1781. The sites still evoke the character of the well-mapped route of the army in 1781 and 1782.

Contents: Counties and municipalities in Connecticut

Fairfield (city of Bridgeport | town of Greenwich | city of Stamford) | Hartford (city of Hartford | town of Southington | town of West Hartford | town of Windsor) | Litchfield | Middlesex (city of Middletown) | New Haven (city of New Haven) | New London | Tolland | Windham

This National Park Service list is complete through NPS recent listings posted September 11, 2026.

== Current listings ==
	Name on the Register	Image	Date listed	Location	City or town	Description
1	The Allen House	The Allen House	July 22, 2010 (#10000492)	4 Burritt's Landing North; 41°06′57″N 73°22′32″W	Westport	Built in 1958, the house is the only known example in Westport of work by Chicago architect Roy Binkley, Jr.
2	Aspetuck Historic District	Aspetuck Historic District	August 23, 1991 (#91000437)	Roughly, Redding Road from its Junction with Old Redding Road to Welles Hill Road and Old Redding Road North past the Aspetuck River; 41°13′24″N 73°19′24″W	Easton and Weston	A historic district that "embodies the distinctive architectural and cultural-landscape characteristics of a farming community from the late colonial and early national periods.... The widely spaced distribution of houses, most accompanied by a barn and all with ample yards that once served as pasture, field or garden recalls the appearance of an inland Connecticut farming community when agriculture was the basis of the local economy."
3	Caleb Baldwin Tavern	Caleb Baldwin Tavern	August 23, 2002 (#02000869)	32 Main Street; 41°24′46″N 73°18′31″W	Newtown	Built c. 1763, a two-and-a-half-story house which hosted officers of French commander Rochambeau's troops in 1781 en route to the Siege of Yorktown, Virginia. It also an example of traditional 18th-century New England architecture, and retains some details from that time period. The house is located within the Newtown Borough Historic District.
4	Ball and Roller Bearing Company	Ball and Roller Bearing Company	August 25, 1989 (#89001087)	20-22 Maple Avenue; 41°23′54″N 73°27′08″W	Danbury	Also known as American Family Crafts or Joseph McNutt House and Machine Shop, this is a building from 1917, plus a company office building that was the Queen Anne-style former home of Joseph Nutt.
5	Aaron Barlow House	Aaron Barlow House	April 29, 1982 (#82004347)	Umpawaug Road at Station Road; 41°19′14″N 73°25′33″W	Redding	Built in 1730; important as a surviving example embodying "the characteristics of early Georgian style domestic architecture that became prominent in the Colonies beginning in the mid-18th century" and also for its association with Col. Aaron Barlow, Joel Barlow, and General Israel Putnam. It is located in the West Redding section of the town.
6	Daniel and Esther Bartlett House	Daniel and Esther Bartlett House	April 15, 1993 (#93000290)	43 Lonetown Road; 41°18′40″N 73°23′09″W	Redding	Federal style house built in 1796, well-preserved, somewhat unusual for its shingle siding.
7	Daniel Basset House	Daniel Basset House	August 23, 2002 (#02000870)	1024 Monroe Turnpike; 41°20′58″N 73°11′53″W	Monroe	Colonial house that was, on June 30, 1781, site of a ball given for a mounted detachment of Rochambeau's army, which camped nearby.
8	Benedict House and Shop	Benedict House and Shop	December 4, 1998 (#98001440)	57 Rockwell Road; 41°16′19″N 73°29′32″W	Ridgefield	House was built in 1740 with an adjoining cobbler's shop, significant as a rare surviving example of a colonial artisan's workshop. Sympathetic renovated by architect Cass Gilbert and other care has preserved the property in good condition.
9	Beth Israel Synagogue	Beth Israel Synagogue	November 29, 1991 (#91001684)	31 Concord Street; 41°05′34″N 73°25′12″W	Norwalk	Former synagogue that is unusual for its Moorish onion domes.
10	Birdcraft Sanctuary	Birdcraft Sanctuary	June 23, 1982 (#82004371)	314 Unquowa Road; 41°08′43″N 73°15′31″W	Fairfield	Oldest bird sanctuary in the U.S., where Mabel Osgood Wright originated "birdscaping".
11	Nathan B. Booth House	Nathan B. Booth House	April 17, 1992 (#92000317)	6080 Main Street; 41°14′21″N 73°06′36″W	Stratford	A post-and-beam construction farmhouse built in 1843. It is of vernacular architecture and illustrates a transition between Greek Revival architecture and Federal architecture styles. The house is located in the Putney section of town.
12	Boothe Homestead	Boothe Homestead	May 1, 1985 (#85000951)	5774 Main Street; 41°13′34″N 73°06′35″W	Stratford	Historic homestead and museum of Americana.
13	Boston Post Road Historic District	Boston Post Road Historic District	December 16, 1982 (#82000997)	567-728 Boston Post Road, 1-25 Brookside Road, and 45-70 Old Kings Highway North; 41°04′51″N 73°27′58″W	Darien	Historic district that includes a row of 12 nineteenth-century houses on Boston Post Road, and a town hall and a Greek Revival church.
14	Bradley Edge Tool Company Historic District	Bradley Edge Tool Company Historic District	November 22, 1995 (#95001347)	Roughly, Lyons Plains Road North and South of its Junction with White Birch Road; 41°11′52″N 73°21′13″W	Weston	District of 30 contributing buildings and the site of the Bradley Edge Tool Company complex, which burned in 1911. Its Miles Bradley House is an "exceptional example of Italianate architecture", with unusual "double bullseye windows".
15	Bradley-Hubbell House	Bradley-Hubbell House	April 18, 2003 (#03000235)	535 Black Rock Turnpike; 41°14′41″N 73°19′15″W	Easton	
16	Bradley-Wheeler House	Bradley-Wheeler House	July 5, 1984 (#84000791)	25 Avery Place; 41°08′39″N 73°21′41″W	Westport	Headquarters and museum of the Westport Historical Society
17	Branchville Railroad Tenement	Branchville Railroad Tenement	August 12, 1982 (#82004346)	Portland Avenue and West Branchville Road; 41°15′56″N 73°26′23″W	Ridgefield	
18	Marcel Breuer House II	Marcel Breuer House II	September 24, 2010 (#10000572)	122 Sunset Hill Road; 41°09′21″N 73°30′25″W	New Canaan	Mid-Twentieth-Century Modern Residences in Connecticut 1930–1979, MPS
19	Bridge Street Historic District	Bridge Street Historic District	April 19, 2018 (#100002318)	Bridge Street, Imperial Avenue, & Compo Road South; 41°07′23″N 73°21′52″W	Westport	
20	Bronson Windmill	Bronson Windmill	December 29, 1971 (#71000896)	3015 Bronson Road; 41°10′21″N 73°17′32″W	Fairfield	
21	Brookfield Center Historic District	Brookfield Center Historic District	August 15, 1991 (#91000992)	Around Junction of Route 25 & Route 133; 41°28′04″N 73°23′17″W	Brookfield	
22	Hugh Cain Fulling Mill and Elias Glover Woolen Mill Archeological Site	Hugh Cain Fulling Mill and Elias Glover Woolen Mill Archeological Site	September 19, 1985 (#85002440)	North of Topstone Road on the Norwalk River; 41°17′56″N 73°27′21″W	Ridgefield	
23	Camps Nos. 10 and 41 of Rochambeau's Army	Camps Nos. 10 and 41 of Rochambeau's Army	May 6, 2002 (#02000424)	Address Restricted; 41°24′53″N 73°18′08″W	Newtown	Marker on US 6 East of Newtown Center.
24	Cannondale Historic District	Cannondale Historic District	November 12, 1992 (#92001531)	Roughly bounded by Cannon, Danbury and Seeley Roads; 41°13′21″N 73°25′34″W	Wilton	A 202-acre (82 ha) historic district that is significant for coherently embodying "the distinctive architectural and cultural-landscape characteristics of a small commercial center as well as an agricultural community from the early national period through the early 20th century....[including embodying] virtually the full array of human activity in this region—farming, residential, religious, educational, community groups (the Grange), small-scale manufacturing, transportation, and even government (the building that housed the first Cannondale Post Office)."
25	Chichester Road Historic District		March 2, 2026 (#100012774)	126, 128, 136, 160, 188, 202 Chichester Road; 41°09′09″N 73°31′16″W	New Canaan	
26	Arthur and Lyn Chivvis House	Arthur and Lyn Chivvis House	September 24, 2010 (#10000564)	2 Wydendown Road; 41°10′56″N 73°30′27″W	New Canaan	Mid-Twentieth-Century Modern Residences in Connecticut 1930–1979, MPS
27	Christ Episcopal Church and Tashua Burial Ground	Christ Episcopal Church and Tashua Burial Ground	April 25, 2001 (#01000401)	5170 Madison Avenue; 41°17′12″N 73°15′38″W	Trumbull	
28	Commodore Hull School	Commodore Hull School	June 30, 1983 (#83001251)	130 Oak Avenue; 41°19′05″N 73°06′03″W	Shelton	A former elementary school that was built in 1907, believed to be the only elementary school in Connecticut constructed of terra cotta blocks and reinforced concrete construction, and significant as an example of the movement towards completely fireproof building, in general stirred by the 1871 great fire of Chicago. Its design is "bold, colorful, and striking".
29	Compo-Owenoke Historic District	Compo-Owenoke Historic District	April 19, 1991 (#91000393)	Roughly bounded by Gray's Creek, Compo Road South, and Long Island Sound; 41°06′22″N 73°21′18″W	Westport	
30	Abijah Comstock House	Abijah Comstock House	October 16, 2017 (#100001731)	1328 Smith Ridge Road; 41°11′53″N 73°30′29″W	New Canaan	
31	Cosier-Murphy House	Cosier-Murphy House	July 31, 1991 (#91000994)	67 CT 39; 41°28′11″N 73°28′27″W	New Fairfield	
32	Nathaniel Curtis House	Nathaniel Curtis House	April 15, 1982 (#82004342)	600 Housatonic Avenue; 41°11′48″N 73°07′12″W	Stratford	
33	Hanford Davenport House	Hanford Davenport House	August 3, 1989 (#89000948)	353 Oenoke Ridge; 41°09′35″N 73°30′13″W	New Canaan	
34	Durisol House	Durisol House	September 24, 2010 (#10000566)	43 Marshall Ridge Road; 41°08′24″N 73°30′01″W	New Canaan	Mid-Twentieth-Century Modern Residences in Connecticut 1930–1979, MPS
35	Rev. John Ely House	Rev. John Ely House	April 25, 2001 (#01000400)	54 Milwaukee Avenue; 41°22′30″N 73°24′13″W	Bethel	
36	Fairfield Hills Campus Historic District	Fairfield Hills Campus Historic District	September 16, 2024 (#100010816)	1st Street, Keating Farms Avenue, Primrose Street, Trades Lane, Wasserman Way; 41°24′N 73°17′W	Newtown	The grounds of the former Fairfield State Hospital
37	Fairfield Historic District	Fairfield Historic District	March 24, 1971 (#71000897)	Old Post Road from Post Road to Turney Road; 41°08′38″N 73°14′59″W	Fairfield	
38	Fairfield Railroad Stations	Fairfield Railroad Stations	July 28, 1989 (#89000926)	165 Unquowa Road (westbound); 41°08′34″N 73°15′29″W	Fairfield	
39	Five Mile River Landing Historic District	Five Mile River Landing Historic District	September 23, 2009 (#08001189)	Rowayton Avenue to Jo's Barn Way; 41°04′13″N 73°26′35″W	Norwalk	
40	Elinor and Sherman Ford House	Elinor and Sherman Ford House	September 24, 2010 (#10000574)	55 Talmadge Hill Road; 41°06′51″N 73°29′29″W	New Canaan	Mid-Twentieth-Century Modern Residences in Connecticut 1930–1979, MPS
41	Gallaher Estate	Gallaher Estate	June 23, 2011 (#11000376)	300 Grumman Avenue; 41°09′50″N 73°24′17″W	Norwalk	
42	Georgetown Historic District	Georgetown Historic District	March 9, 1987 (#87000343)	Roughly bounded by US 7, Portland Avenue, CT 107, and the Norwalk River; 41°15′19″N 73°25′53″W	Redding and Wilton	Historic district consisting of the former Gilbert and Bennett manufacturing plant, institutional housing built for the plant workers, and other private homes.
43	Glover House	Glover House	February 11, 1982 (#82004369)	50 Main Street; 41°24′55″N 73°18′36″W	Newtown	
44	John Glover House	John Glover House	August 17, 2001 (#01000882)	53 Echo Valley Road; 41°26′49″N 73°18′34″W	Newtown	
45	Godillot Place	Godillot Place	August 29, 1977 (#77001396)	60, 65 Jesup Road; 41°08′25″N 73°21′35″W	Westport	A Stick style house built in 1879, an associated cottage, and a carriage barn.
46	Landis Gores House	Landis Gores House	March 21, 2002 (#02000189)	192 Cross Ridge Road; 41°11′54″N 73°29′48″W	New Canaan	An austere International Style built in 1948, home of Harvard Five architect Landis Gores
47	Green Farms School	Green Farms School	April 19, 1991 (#91000391)	Junction of Morningside Drive South and Post Road East, In the Greens Farms; 41°08′13″N 73°19′31″W	Westport	Tudor Revival style school built in 1925, designed by architect Charles Cutler
48	Greenfield Hill Grange #133	Greenfield Hill Grange #133	January 25, 2008 (#07001440)	1873 Hillside Road; 41°11′03″N 73°17′38″W	Fairfield	
49	Greenfield Hill Historic District	Greenfield Hill Historic District	March 11, 1971 (#71000899)	Roughly bounded by the Merritt Parkway, Burr Street, Redding Road, Hulls Farm Road and Hill Farm Road; 41°10′25″N 73°17′28″W	Fairfield	
50	Greens Ledge Lighthouse	Greens Ledge Lighthouse	May 29, 1990 (#89001468)	Long Island Sound, south of the Five Mile River and west of Norwalk Harbor; 41°02′29″N 73°26′40″W	Norwalk	
51	Morris and Rose Greenwald House		October 28, 2024 (#100010953)	11 Homeward Lane; 41°11′50″N 73°21′24″W	Weston	
52	Greenwood Avenue Historic District	Greenwood Avenue Historic District	December 17, 1999 (#99001568)	Roughly along Greenwood Avenue, P.T. Barnum Square, Depot Place, and South Street; 41°22′01″N 73°24′48″W	Bethel	
53	Isaac Davis and Marion Dalton Hall House	Isaac Davis and Marion Dalton Hall House	September 24, 2010 (#10000573)	25 Lambert Road; 41°09′35″N 73°30′10″W	New Canaan	Mid-Twentieth-Century Modern Residences in Connecticut 1930–1979, MPS
54	Hampton Inn	Hampton Inn	October 27, 2004 (#89001106)	179 Oenoke Ridge; 41°09′16″N 73°30′00″W	New Canaan	
55	Hattertown Historic District	Hattertown Historic District	December 6, 1996 (#96001461)	Roughly, Junction of Aunt Park Lane, Castle Meadow, Hattertown, and Hi Barlow Roads; 41°20′24″N 73°18′31″W	Newtown	
56	Haviland and Elizabeth Streets-Hanford Place Historic District	Haviland and Elizabeth Streets-Hanford Place Historic District	May 26, 1988 (#88000664)	Roughly bounded by Haviland, Day Streets, Hanford Place, and South Main Street; 41°05′49″N 73°25′07″W	Norwalk	Cohesive group of 36 late 19th- and early 20th-century houses, exemplifying Queen Anne, Colonial Revival, Italianate, Second Empire architectural styles and vernacular interpretations thereof. The district is located in South Norwalk.
57	Thomas Hawley House	Thomas Hawley House	April 11, 1980 (#80004059)	514 Purdy Hill Road; 41°18′20″N 73°15′10″W	Monroe	
58	Hearthstone	Hearthstone	December 31, 1987 (#87002184)	18 Brushy Hill Road; 41°22′41″N 73°26′55″W	Danbury	
59	Richard and Geraldine Hodgson House	Richard and Geraldine Hodgson House	January 28, 2005 (#04001549)	881 Ponus Ridge Road; 41°08′42″N 73°31′36″W	New Canaan	
60	Housatonic River Railroad Bridge	Housatonic River Railroad Bridge	June 12, 1987 (#87000842)	Amtrak right-of-way at the Housatonic River; 41°12′19″N 73°06′37″W	Stratford and Milford	
61	Hoyt-Burwell-Morse House	Hoyt-Burwell-Morse House	January 31, 2017 (#100000594)	8 Ferris Hill Road; 41°10′06″N 73°29′10″W	New Canaan	
62	Huntington Center Historic District	Huntington Center Historic District	March 31, 2000 (#00000296)	Roughly along Church and Huntington Streets, from Ripton Road to the Farmill River; 41°17′29″N 73°08′39″W	Shelton	
63	Hurlbutt Street School	Hurlbutt Street School	July 25, 1996 (#96000774)	157 Hurlbutt Street; 41°12′03″N 73°24′34″W	Wilton	
64	Thomas Hyatt House	Thomas Hyatt House	February 16, 1984 (#84000793)	11 Barlow Mountain Road; 41°19′10″N 73°30′41″W	Ridgefield	
65	Charles Ives House	Charles Ives House	April 26, 1976 (#76001968)	7 Mountainville Avenue; 41°22′54″N 73°26′43″W	Danbury	1780 house of Ives family, moved twice, was birthplace of composer Charles Ives in 1874.
66	Philip Johnson Glass House	Philip Johnson Glass House	February 18, 1997 (#97000341)	798-856 Ponus Ridge Road; 41°08′31″N 73°31′47″W	New Canaan	Modern masterpiece of glass and steel by architect Philip Johnson.
67	Capt. David Judson House	Capt. David Judson House	March 20, 1973 (#73001946)	967 Academy Hill; 41°11′16″N 73°07′47″W	Stratford	Georgian home built in 1723, stone fireplace and foundation from 1639.
68	Lewis June House	Lewis June House	February 16, 1984 (#84000795)	478 North Salem Road; 41°19′00″N 73°30′47″W	Ridgefield	
69	Keeler Tavern	Keeler Tavern	April 29, 1982 (#82004345)	152 Main Street; 41°16′22″N 73°29′50″W	Ridgefield	
70	Enos Kellogg House	Enos Kellogg House	June 27, 2012 (#12000356)	210 Ponus Avenue Extension; 41°07′56″N 73°27′26″W	Norwalk	
71	Kettle Creek Historic District	Kettle Creek Historic District	November 22, 1995 (#95001348)	Roughly, Weston and Old Weston Roads North of Broad Street; 41°11′12″N 73°22′15″W	Weston	
72	Kings Highway North Historic District	Kings Highway North Historic District	August 10, 1998 (#98000884)	Roughly along Kings Highway North, from Wilton Road to Woodside Avenue; 41°08′26″N 73°22′06″W	Westport	
73	David Lambert House	David Lambert House	July 24, 1992 (#92000908)	150 Danbury Road; 41°10′50″N 73°25′18″W	Wilton	
74	Nathan B. Lattin Farm		May 24, 1990 (#90000760)	22 Walker Hill Road; 41°22′11″N 73°12′37″W	Newtown	
75	John Black Lee House I	John Black Lee House I	September 24, 2010 (#10000568)	729 Laurel Road; 41°11′25″N 73°30′01″W	New Canaan	Mid-Twentieth-Century Modern Residences in Connecticut 1930–1979, MPS
76	LeRoy Shirt Company Factory	LeRoy Shirt Company Factory	June 27, 2012 (#12000357)	11 Chestnut Street; 41°05′45″N 73°25′15″W	Norwalk	
77	Isaac Lewis House	Isaac Lewis House	November 21, 1991 (#91001739)	50 Paradise Green Place; 41°12′33″N 73°07′54″W	Stratford	
78	Lockwood-Mathews Mansion	Lockwood-Mathews Mansion	December 30, 1970 (#70000836)	295 West Avenue; 41°06′31″N 73°25′05″W	Norwalk	Second Empire style mansion built in 1864.
79	Locust Avenue School	Locust Avenue School	May 30, 1985 (#85001162)	26 Locust Avenue; 41°24′18″N 73°26′09″W	Danbury	1896 school designed by architect Warren Briggs and featured in his Modern American School Buildings. One of the last 19th century schools still used in the state, and one of the last "lab schools", used for advanced teacher training. Today Danbury's alternative high school.
80	The Lodges Historic District	The Lodges Historic District	August 31, 2020 (#100005501)	68 and 70 South Main Street; 41°05′48″N 73°25′08″W	Norwalk	
81	Joseph Loth Company Building	Joseph Loth Company Building	May 17, 1984 (#84000804)	25 Grand Street; 41°07′29″N 73°25′26″W	Norwalk	
82	Phineas Chapman Lounsbury House	Phineas Chapman Lounsbury House	October 3, 1975 (#75001919)	316 Main Street; 41°16′46″N 73°29′52″W	Ridgefield	
83	Main Street Historic District	Main Street Historic District	November 29, 1983 (#83003508)	Boughton, Elm, Ives, Keeler, Main, West and White Streets; 41°23′39″N 73°27′06″W	Danbury	
84	David Mallett Jr. House	David Mallett Jr. House	February 20, 1986 (#86000266)	420 Tashua Road; 41°17′16″N 73°15′37″W	Trumbull	Built in 1760, an exceptionally well-preserved center-chimney colonial farmhouse, and has significance for its 150 year history of association with the Mallett family. The house is located in the Tashua District of Trumbull.
85	March Route of Rochambeau's Army: Reservoir Road	March Route of Rochambeau's Army: Reservoir Road	January 8, 2003 (#02001679)	Junction of Reservoir Road and Mount Pleasant Road South; 41°24′48″N 73°19′23″W	Newtown	
86	March Route of Rochambeau's Army: Ridgebury Road	March Route of Rochambeau's Army: Ridgebury Road	June 6, 2003 (#03000313)	Ridgebury Road, from intersection with Old Stagecoach South; 41°20′36″N 73°31′47″W	Ridgefield	
87	Marvin Tavern	Marvin Tavern	April 26, 1984 (#84000806)	405 Danbury Road; 41°12′42″N 73°25′58″W	Wilton	
88	Stephen Tyng Mather House	Stephen Tyng Mather House	October 15, 1966 (#66000877)	19 Stephen Mather Road; 41°06′47″N 73°28′31″W	Darien	Home of Stephen Tyng Mather, champion for the formation of the National Park Service and its first director.
89	Meadowlands	Meadowlands	October 6, 1987 (#87001408)	274 Middlesex Road; 41°04′43″N 73°29′12″W	Darien	
90	Meeker's Hardware	Meeker's Hardware	June 9, 1983 (#83001253)	86-90 White Street; 41°23′50″N 73°27′04″W	Danbury	
91	Merritt Parkway	Merritt Parkway	April 17, 1991 (#91000410)	CT 15 and right-of-way between the New York State line and the Housatonic River Bridge; 41°09′12″N 73°24′14″W	Greenwich, Stamford, New Canaan, Norwalk, Westport, Fairfield, Trumbull, Stratford	
92	Mill Cove Historic District	Mill Cove Historic District	April 19, 1991 (#91000392)	Between Compo Mill Cove and Long Island Sound; 41°06′47″N 73°20′32″W	Westport	
93	Beaven W. Mills House	Beaven W. Mills House	September 24, 2010 (#10000565)	31 Chichester Road; 41°08′52″N 73°31′11″W	New Canaan	Mid-Twentieth-Century Modern Residences in Connecticut 1930–1979, MPS
94	Willis N. Mills House	Willis N. Mills House	September 24, 2010 (#10000567)	1380 Ponus Ridge Road; 41°09′31″N 73°32′02″W	New Canaan	Mid-Twentieth-Century Modern Residences in Connecticut 1930–1979, MPS
95	Monroe Center Historic District	Monroe Center Historic District	August 19, 1977 (#77001392)	CT 110 and CT 111; 41°19′57″N 73°12′26″W	Monroe	
96	Charles and Peggy Murphy House	Charles and Peggy Murphy House	September 24, 2010 (#10000563)	320 North Wilton Road; 41°11′31″N 73°30′02″W	New Canaan	Mid-Twentieth-Century Modern Residences in Connecticut 1930–1979, MPS
97	National Hall Historic District	National Hall Historic District	September 13, 1984 (#84000812)	Riverside Avenue, Wilton and Post Roads, Westport; 41°08′25″N 73°21′54″W	Westport	
98	New Haven Railroad Danbury Turntable	New Haven Railroad Danbury Turntable	September 15, 2005 (#05001048)	120 White Street; 41°23′49″N 73°26′47″W	Danbury	A railroad turntable in the yard of the Danbury Railway Museum.
99	New York Belting and Packing Co.	New York Belting and Packing Co.	June 2, 1982 (#82004367)	45-71 and 79-89 Glen Road; 41°25′52″N 73°16′42″W	Newtown	
100	Newtown Borough Historic District	Newtown Borough Historic District	December 20, 1996 (#96001458)	Roughly, Main Street from Hawley Road to Academy Lane; 41°24′43″N 73°18′32″W	Newtown	A 100-acre (40 ha)historic district including core of the original borough of Newtown. Includes 225 contributing buildings, a locally important flagpole, and the "Ram's Pasture", a meadow that was common land.
101	Nichols Farms Historic District	Nichols Farms Historic District	August 20, 1987 (#87001392)	Center Road, 1681-1944 Huntington Turnpike, 5-34 Priscilla Place, and 30-172 Shelton Road; 41°14′33″N 73°09′53″W	Trumbull	Located atop Mischa Hill along the Farm Highway in Nichols, the district includes many good examples from a wide range of architectural styles from the 17th, 18th, 19th and 20th centuries. The buildings stand together in their original village setting. Most properties include a period barn or carriage house and all have ample yards that once served as pasture, field or garden, and recalls the appearance of an inland Connecticut farming community when agriculture was the basis of the local economy. The architecture also reflects the influences of three stages of economic development, the original agricultural settlement, the 19th century industrial activity, and the 20th century function as a suburb of a large city.
102	Nichols Satinet Mill Site	Nichols Satinet Mill Site	February 23, 1996 (#96000129)	Address Restricted	Newtown	
103	Norfield Historic District	Norfield Historic District	July 31, 1991 (#91000955)	Roughly, Junction of Weston and Norfield Roads Northeast to Hedgerow Common; 41°12′04″N 73°22′44″W	Weston	
104	Norwalk City Hall	Norwalk City Hall	March 23, 1995 (#95000282)	41 North Main Street; 41°06′00″N 73°25′08″W	South Norwalk	
105	Norwalk Green Historic District	Norwalk Green Historic District	December 14, 1987 (#87002122)	Roughly bounded by Smith & Park Streets, North Avenue, East, & Morgan Avenues; 41°07′07″N 73°24′31″W	Norwalk	
106	Noyes House	Noyes House	September 26, 2008 (#08000948)	Country Club Road; 41°10′04″N 73°30′15″W	New Canaan	International Style house designed by Eliot Noyes.
107	Norwalk Island Lighthouse	Norwalk Island Lighthouse	January 19, 1989 (#88003222)	Sheffield Island; 41°02′55″N 73°25′12″W	Norwalk	On Sheffield Island, one of the Norwalk Islands
108	Norwalk River Railroad Bridge	Norwalk River Railroad Bridge	June 12, 1987 (#87000844)	Amtrak/New Haven Line right-of-way at the Norwalk River, in South Norwalk; 41°06′02″N 73°24′57″W	Norwalk	
109	Octagon House	Octagon House	May 7, 1973 (#73001945)	21 Spring Street; 41°23′42″N 73°27′34″W	Danbury	An octagon house built in 1852
110	David Ogden House	David Ogden House	August 17, 1979 (#79002651)	1520 Bronson Road; 41°09′33″N 73°16′37″W	Fairfield	
111	Old Mine Park Archeological Site	Old Mine Park Archeological Site	December 13, 1990 (#90001807)	Old Mine Park; 41°17′17″N 73°13′34″W	Trumbull	
112	John Osborne House	John Osborne House	February 12, 1987 (#87000118)	909 Kings Highway West; 41°08′15″N 73°17′43″W	Fairfield	
113	Oysterman's Row	Oysterman's Row	November 17, 2010 (#10000927)	Roughly bounded by Pond Street, Rowayton Avenue, Cook Street, and Roton Avenue; 41°03′47″N 73°26′39″W	Norwalk	
114	Peck Ledge Lighthouse	Peck Ledge Lighthouse	May 29, 1990 (#89001472)	Long Island Sound, southeast of Norwalk Harbor and Northeast of Goose Island; 41°04′38″N 73°22′13″W	Norwalk	
115	Maxwell E. Perkins House	Maxwell E. Perkins House	May 6, 2004 (#04000415)	63 Park Street; 41°08′49″N 73°29′45″W	New Canaan	House of Maxwell E. Perkins, the editor of Hemingway, Fitzgerald and Thomas Wolfe.
116	Perry Avenue Bridge	Perry Avenue Bridge	October 25, 2006 (#06000951)	Perry Avenue over Silvermine River; 41°09′04″N 73°26′45″W	Norwalk	
117	Pine Creek Park Bridge	Pine Creek Park Bridge	April 8, 1992 (#92000263)	North of Old Dam Road, Over Pine Creek; 41°07′31″N 73°15′48″W	Fairfield	
118	Plumb Memorial Library	Plumb Memorial Library	November 7, 1978 (#78002845)	65 Wooster Street; 41°19′09″N 73°05′56″W	Shelton	
119	Pond-Weed House	Pond-Weed House	October 11, 1978 (#78002842)	2591 Post Road; 41°03′35″N 73°30′11″W	Darien	
120	Verneur Pratt Historic District	Verneur Pratt Historic District	July 19, 2011 (#11000434)	114-116 Perry Avenue; 41°08′40″N 73°26′10″W	Norwalk	Two adjacent properties associated with inventor Verneur Edmund Pratt, including the Keeler-Pratt House, and an adjacent converted carriage barn used by Pratt as a laboratory.
121	Putnam Memorial State Park	Putnam Memorial State Park	December 29, 1970 (#70000683)	Junction of Routes 58 (Black Rock Turnpike) and 107 (Park Road); 41°20′23″N 73°23′01″W	Redding	
122	Redding Center Historic District	Redding Center Historic District	October 1, 1992 (#92001253)	Roughly, 4-25B Cross Highway, including Read Cemetery, 61-100 Hill Road, 0-15 Lonetown Road and 118 Sanfordtown Road; 41°18′14″N 73°22′55″W	Redding	
123	Frederic Remington House	Frederic Remington House	October 15, 1966 (#66000880)	36 Oak Knoll Road; 41°17′17″N 73°31′01″W	Ridgefield	Home of Frederic Remington, a painter and sculptor famous for his depictions of the American West.
124	Restmore	Restmore	July 1, 2009 (#09000467)	375 Warner Hill Road; 41°09′20″N 73°16′47″W	Fairfield	
125	John Rider House	John Rider House	November 23, 1977 (#77001388)	43 Main Street; 41°23′18″N 73°26′48″W	Danbury	
126	Ridgebury Congregational Church	Ridgebury Congregational Church	March 1, 1984 (#84000815)	Ridgebury Road and George Washington Highway; 41°21′38″N 73°31′32″W	Ridgefield	
127	Ridgefield Center Historic District	Ridgefield Center Historic District	September 7, 1984 (#84000817)	Roughly bounded by Pound Street, Fairview Avenue, Prospect, Ridge, and Whipstick Roads; 41°16′35″N 73°29′52″W	Ridgefield	
128	P. Robinson Fur Cutting Company	P. Robinson Fur Cutting Company	November 30, 1982 (#82000998)	Oil Mill Road; 41°23′26″N 73°27′51″W	Danbury	
129	Rock Ledge	Rock Ledge	August 2, 1977 (#77001394)	33, 40-42 Highland Avenue; 41°03′57″N 73°26′11″W	Norwalk	A mansion that belonged to a U.S. Steel executive.
130	John Rogers Studio	John Rogers Studio	October 15, 1966 (#66000881)	33 Oenoke Ridge; 41°09′01″N 73°29′53″W	New Canaan	Studio of nineteenth-century American sculptor John Rogers
131	Rowayton Depot Historic District	Rowayton Depot Historic District	June 21, 2019 (#15000410)	Rowayton Avenue roughly between Arnold & Witch Lanes; 41°04′43″N 73°26′44″W	Norwalk	
132	St. Mark's Episcopal Church	St. Mark's Episcopal Church	January 25, 2021 (#100006054)	111 Oenoke Ridge; 41°09′09″N 73°29′56″W	New Canaan	
133	Sanford-Curtis-Thurber House	Sanford-Curtis-Thurber House	June 21, 2007 (#07000557)	71 Riverside Road; 41°25′31″N 73°15′49″W	Newtown	
134	Saugatuck River Bridge	Saugatuck River Bridge	February 12, 1987 (#87000126)	CT 136; 41°07′22″N 73°22′10″W	Westport	From 1884, a swinging bridge
135	Saugatuck River Railroad Bridge	Saugatuck River Railroad Bridge	June 12, 1987 (#87000846)	Amtrak right-of-way at the Saugatuck River; 41°07′10″N 73°22′08″W	Westport	
136	Seth Seelye House	Seth Seelye House	August 29, 1977 (#77001386)	189 Greenwood Avenue; 41°22′16″N 73°24′51″W	Bethel	
137	Shambaugh House	Shambaugh House	April 9, 1999 (#99000432)	12 Old Hill Road; 41°08′38″N 73°22′12″W	Westport	
138	Sherman Historic District	Sherman Historic District	July 31, 1991 (#91000956)	Roughly the Junction of Old Greenswood Road and CT 37 Center Northeast past the Junction of CT 37 East and CT 39 North, and Sawmill Road; 41°34′44″N 73°29′51″W	Sherman	
139	Silvermine Center Historic District	Silvermine Center Historic District	June 23, 2009 (#07001441)	Roughly centered on Silvermine and Perry Avenues; 41°09′03″N 73°26′48″W	Norwalk	
140	Sloan-Raymond-Fitch House	Sloan-Raymond-Fitch House	April 29, 1982 (#82004344)	224 Danbury Road; 41°11′18″N 73°25′32″W	Wilton	
141	South Main and Washington Streets Historic District	South Main and Washington Streets Historic District	December 16, 1977 (#77001393)	68-139 Washington Street and 2-24 South Main Street; also 11-15 through 54-60 South Main Street; also roughly along North Main Street from Washington Street to Ann Street; 41°05′55″N 73°24′22″W	Norwalk	Second and third sets of boundaries represent boundary increases of November 8, 1985 and April 15, 1999 respectively
142	Southport Historic District	Southport Historic District	March 24, 1971 (#71000898)	Roughly bounded by Southport Harbor, Railroad, Old South Road and Rose Hill Road; 41°07′55″N 73°17′04″W	Fairfield	District of historic, tony homes
143	Southport Railroad Stations	Southport Railroad Stations	July 28, 1989 (#89000927)	96 Station Street and 100 Center Street; 41°08′11″N 73°17′10″W	Fairfield	Working Railroad station (Westbound Building) in the Southport section of Fairfield. Repaired in 2009 after a 2008 fire. Eastbound building (pictured) is no longer a working station.
144	Sterling Homestead	Sterling Homestead	January 1, 1976 (#76001973)	2225 Main Street; 41°11′32″N 73°07′51″W	Stratford	
145	Stevenson Dam Hydroelectric Plant	Stevenson Dam Hydroelectric Plant	September 29, 2000 (#00001073)	CT 34; 41°23′03″N 73°10′16″W	Monroe	Dam, bridge, and powerhouse built in 1917 on the Housatonic River. Extends into Oxford in New Haven County.
146	Stratford Center Historic District	Stratford Center Historic District	December 22, 1983 (#83003511)	Roughly bounded by East Broadway, Ferry Boulevard., Housatonic River, Connecticut Turnpike, Birdseye and Main Streets; 41°11′10″N 73°07′49″W	Stratford	
147	Stratford Point Lighthouse	Stratford Point Lighthouse	May 29, 1990 (#89001476)	Stratford Point at mouth of Housatonic River; 41°09′07″N 73°06′13″W	Stratford	
148	Stratford Shoal Lighthouse	Stratford Shoal Lighthouse	May 29, 1990 (#89001477)	Middleground Shoal, Long Island Sound; 41°03′34″N 73°06′06″W	Stratford	Lighthouse on a shoal in the middle of Long Island Sound, sometimes disputed to be located in New York State (in Nassau County, Long Island?), but probably 1,000 feet within Connecticut.
149	Sturges-Wright House	Sturges-Wright House	March 31, 2015 (#15000111)	93 Cross Highway; 41°09′42″N 73°20′36″W	Westport	
150	Jonathan Sturges House	Jonathan Sturges House	November 23, 1984 (#84000247)	449 Mill Plain Road; 41°08′56″N 73°16′06″W	Fairfield	1840 Gothic Revival cottage
151	James Swallen House	James Swallen House	September 24, 2010 (#10000570)	257 Wahackme Road; 41°08′51″N 73°31′05″W	New Canaan	Mid-Twentieth-Century Modern Residences in Connecticut 1930–1979, MPS
152	System House	System House	September 24, 2010 (#10000571)	128 Chichester Road; 41°09′06″N 73°31′14″W	New Canaan	Mid-Twentieth-Century Modern Residences in Connecticut 1930–1979, MPS
153	Ida Tarbell House	Ida Tarbell House	April 19, 1993 (#93001602)	320 Valley Road; 41°18′25″N 73°19′56″W	Easton	Home of the muckraking journalist and author of The History of the Standard Oil Company
154	Tarrywile	Tarrywile	January 6, 1988 (#87001409)	Southern Boulevard & Mountain Road; 41°22′46″N 73°27′10″W	Danbury	A Shingle Style house, with gatehouse, in Danbury, Connecticut that was built in 1895.
155	Corinne and George Liston Tatum Jr. House	Corinne and George Liston Tatum Jr. House	September 24, 2010 (#10000569)	431 Valley Road; 41°10′17″N 73°28′29″W	New Canaan	Mid-Twentieth-Century Modern Residences in Connecticut 1930–1979, MPS
156	Titicus Hill Historic District	Titicus Hill Historic District	May 17, 2012 (#12000267)	Roughly bounded by Junction of Main Street & Danbury Road, North Street & North Salem Road, New Street & North Salem Road; 41°17′26″N 73°30′02″W	Ridgefield	
157	Town Hall	Town Hall	May 18, 1982 (#82004343)	90 Post Road East; 41°08′28″N 73°21′39″W	Westport	The former Town Hall
158	Umpawaug District School	Umpawaug District School	December 1, 1988 (#88002695)	Umpawaug Road; 41°18′56″N 73°25′46″W	Redding	
159	Union Station	Union Station	September 25, 1986 (#86002750)	120 White Street; 41°23′43″N 73°26′14″W	Danbury	Next to the Danbury Railroad Station and close by Meeker's Hardware
160	US Post Office-South Norwalk Main	US Post Office-South Norwalk Main	January 21, 1986 (#86000126)	16 Washington Street; 41°05′56″N 73°25′17″W	Norwalk	
161	United States Post Office, Westport, Connecticut	United States Post Office, Westport, Connecticut	April 3, 2012 (#12000001)	154 Post Road East; 41°08′28″N 73°21′35″W	Westport	Former post office, now a restaurant
162	Village Creek	Village Creek	July 26, 2010 (#10000493)	Roughly bounded by Village Creek, Hayes Creek and Woodward Avenue; 41°04′44″N 73°25′06″W	Norwalk	A community in South Norwalk
163	Wall Street Historic District	Wall Street Historic District	September 23, 2009 (#09000342)	Roughly bounded by Commerce, Knight, and Wall Streets, West and Mott Avenues; 41°07′06″N 73°24′45″W	Norwalk	
164	Washington Bridge	Washington Bridge	September 29, 2004 (#04001093)	U.S. Route 1 at the Housatonic River; 41°12′01″N 73°06′39″W	Stratford	Extends into Milford in New Haven County.
165	Dr. Harvey and Rhoda Wasserman House		October 28, 2024 (#100010945)	23 Huckleberry Lane; 41°10′58″N 73°21′56″W	Weston	
166	Waveny	Waveny	September 30, 2019 (#100004543)	Roughly bounded by Lapham, Old Stamford & Farm Roads and Merritt Parkway; 41°07′20″N 73°29′27″W	New Canaan	
167	David Jr. and Sarah Webb House	David Jr. and Sarah Webb House	October 20, 2011 (#11000751)	1161 Ponus Ridge; 41°09′06″N 73°31′48″W	New Canaan	
168	Weir Farm National Historic Site	Weir Farm National Historic Site	October 31, 1990 (#03000284)	735 Nod Hill Road; 41°15′21″N 73°27′22″W	Wilton and Ridgefield	
169	West Mountain Historic District	West Mountain Historic District	February 23, 1984 (#84000828)	CT 102; 41°17′53″N 73°31′44″W	Ridgefield	
170	Westport Bank and Trust Company	Westport Bank and Trust Company	November 6, 2006 (#06000593)	87 Post Road East; 41°08′30″N 73°21′40″W	Westport	
171	Westport Center Historic District	Westport Center Historic District	July 19, 2016 (#16000449)	Avery Place, Bay Elm & Main Streets, Imperial & Myrtle Avenues, Church & Violet Lanes, Post Road East; 41°08′29″N 73°21′40″W	Westport	
172	Ephraim Wheeler House	Ephraim Wheeler House	April 17, 1992 (#92000318)	470 Whippoorwill Lane; 41°15′11″N 73°06′55″W	Stratford	
173	Whistleville Historic District		June 8, 2021 (#100006641)	Ely and Lexington Avenues, Hemlock and Lubrano Places, Knapp, Kossuth, Laura, Olean, Oxford and Snowden Streets; 41°05′24″N 73°25′24″W	Norwalk	
174	Williams House	Williams House	May 4, 2014 (#13000525)	5 Williams Road; 41°27′22″N 73°29′33″W	New Fairfield	
175	Wilton Center Historic District	Wilton Center Historic District	August 19, 1992 (#92001003)	Roughly the area around the Junction of Lovers Lane and Belden Hill and Ridgefield Roads; 41°11′43″N 73°26′20″W	Wilton	

== Former listings ==
	Name on the Register	Image	Date listed	Date removed	Location	City or town	Description
1	Kaatz Icehouse	Kaatz Icehouse	September 19, 1977 (#77001395)	October 19, 2009	255 Whitney Avenue; 41°17′00″N 73°13′03″W	Trumbull	A former warehouse-type building on Kaatz Pond that operated as an icehouse from 1908 to 1955. It was demolished in 1978.

== See also ==
- List of National Historic Landmarks in Connecticut
- National Register of Historic Places listings in Connecticut
