= Shambaugh =

Shambaugh may refer to:

== Places ==
- Shambaugh, Iowa, a city in Page County, Iowa
- Shambaugh House, a house in Westport, Connecticut that is on the National Register of Historic Places

== Surnames ==
- Charles Shambaugh (1839–1913), Union soldier in the American Civil War
- David Shambaugh (born 1953), American academic
- George E. Shambaugh, Jr. (1903–1999), American academic and surgeon
- Jay Shambaugh, Under Secretary of the Treasury for International Affairs
- Jessie Field Shambaugh (1881–1971), American educator and activist
