= Nichols Satinet Mill Site =

Archaeological site in Connecticut, United States

- U.S. National Register of Historic Places
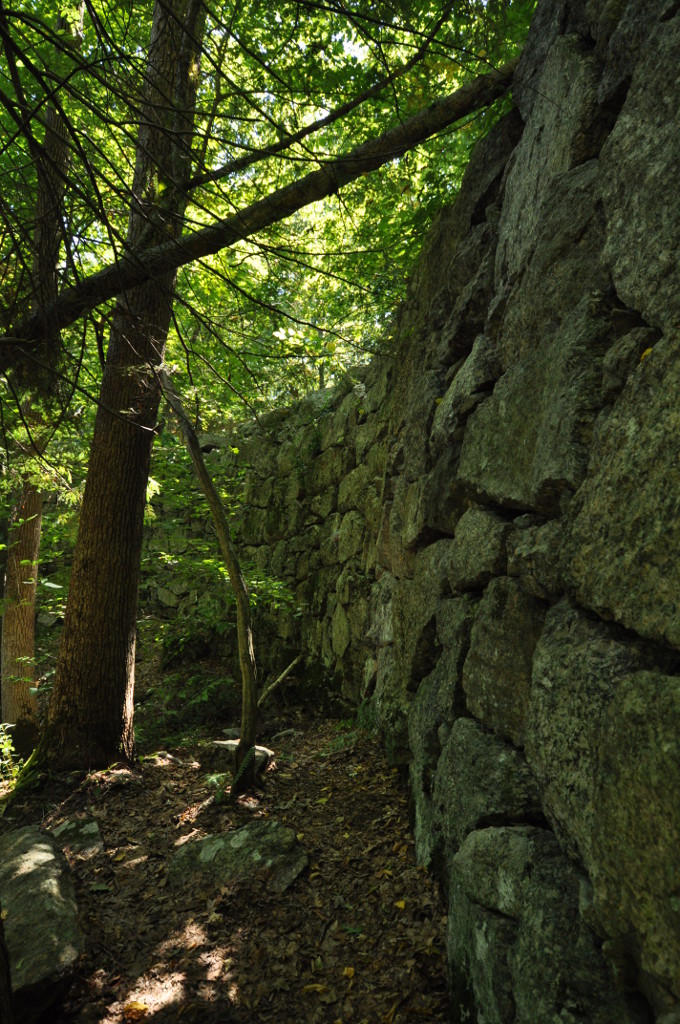
- Front face of the mill dam
- Location: Address Restricted, Newtown, Connecticut
- Area: 2 acres (0.81 ha)
- Built: 1811
- NRHP reference No.: 96000129
- Added to NRHP: February 23, 1996

The Nichols Satinet Mill Site, also known as Site No. 97-14, is a historic industrial archeological site in Newtown, Connecticut. It was listed on the National Register of Historic Places in 1996.

It is also known as the Orchard Hill Mill Site and is the mill within the Orchard Hill Nature Center. The site was listed on the National Register more than a decade after residents created the nature center.

The site is owned by the town of Newtown. Listing was believed to increase the chance that it could become the focus of a dig by state archeologists. The site was owned by the Nichols family in the 1760s. The property includes two old dams and mill sites. The second-built dam on the site is a 30 feet (9.1 m)-high, 125 feet (38 m)-long structure made of granite blocks.

The property was studied in 1983 by George W. Adams, with the assistance of Albert S. Knapp, in a study that led to creation of the nature center, consisting of about 32 acres (13 ha).

== See also ==
- National Register of Historic Places listings in Fairfield County, Connecticut
