= Greenfield Hill Grange No. 133 =

- Greenfield Hill Grange #133
- U.S. National Register of Historic Places
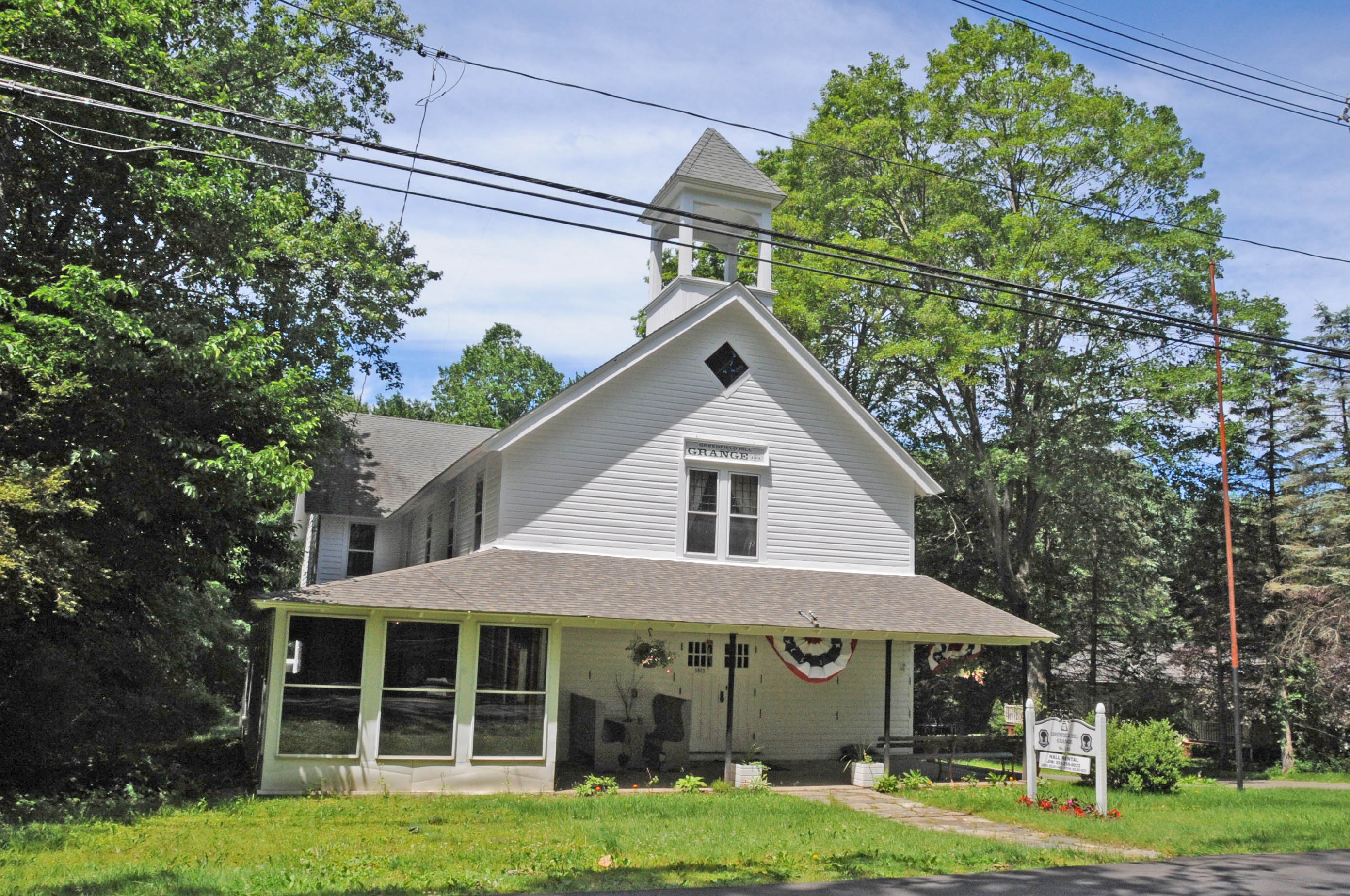

- Location within Connecticut Location within the United States
- Location: 1873 Hillside Road, Fairfield, Connecticut
- Coordinates: 41°11′3″N 73°17′38″W
- Area: less than one acre
- Built: 1897
- Built by: Perry, Frank
- Architectural style: Queen Anne
- NRHP reference No.: 07001440
- Added to NRHP: January 25, 2008

The Greenfield Hill Grange #133 is a historic grange hall at 1873 Hillside Road in Fairfield, Connecticut. Built in 1897, it is one of a few documented examples of high-quality architecture built specifically for a grange chapter in the state. The property was listed on the National Register of Historic Places in 2008. The building continues to be owned by a local chapter, even though the area it serves no longer has many farms.

== Description and history ==
The Greenfield Hill Grange is located in Fairfield's northern Greenfield Hill neighborhood, on the west side of Hillside Road near its junction with Congress Street. It is a two-story frame structure, with a gabled roof and exterior finished in novelty siding. A single-story porch, now partially enclosed, wraps around three sides of the building, supported by slender Tuscan-style round columns. The interior retains many late 19th-century decorative elements, including pressed tin ceiling and post coverings, vertical wainscoting, and plaster crown molding details. The metal ceilings are believed to be among the earliest of their type to be sold, based on their patterning.

The Greenfield Hill Grange chapter was organized in 1893, when northern Fairfield was a largely agricultural area focused on flax production. The chapter began planning for construction of the hall in 1896, and it was dedicated the following year. The chapter organized fairs, lectures, and other events, and typically had a membership of about 200. The building was enlarged to the rear in 1931.

== See also ==
- National Register of Historic Places listings in Fairfield County, Connecticut
