= Cranbury Park (Norwalk, Connecticut) =

- Gallaher Estate
- U.S. National Register of Historic Places
- U.S. Historic district
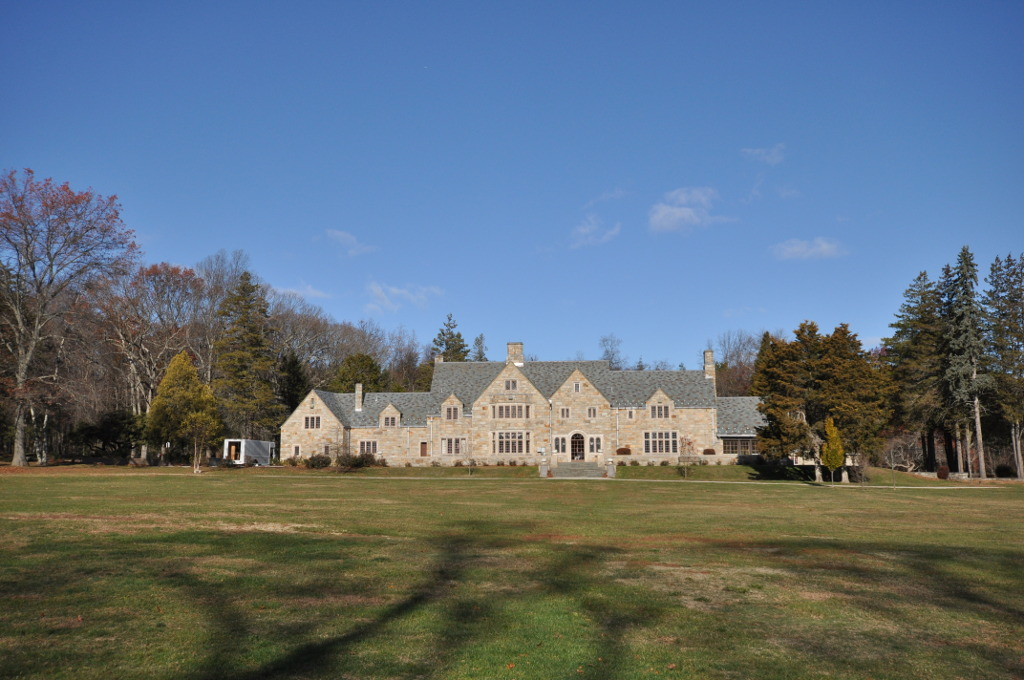
- The main estate house

- Location within Connecticut Location within the United States
- Location: 300 Grumman Avenue, Norwalk, Connecticut
- Coordinates: 41°9′50″N 73°24′17″W
- Area: 227 acres (92 ha)
- Built: 1929
- Built by: Matthews Construction Company
- Architect: Percy L. Fowler & Company
- Architectural style: Tudor Revival
- NRHP reference No.: 11000376
- Added to NRHP: June 23, 2011

Cranbury Park is the largest public park in Norwalk, Connecticut. It is located in northern Norwalk, on the former Gallaher Estate, a 227-acre (92 ha) country estate developed in the 1920s by Edward Beach Gallaher, an important figure in the early American automobile industry. The park's amenities include miles of walking trails, a picnic pavilion, a disc golf course, and the Carriage House Arts Center, located in the estate's former carriage house. The park was listed on the National Register of Historic Places in 2011.

== History ==
Edward Gallaher was a New Jersey-born mechanical engineer who was a prolific inventor and founder of the Keystone Motor Company of Philadelphia. In 1910 he moved to Norwalk, and in 1917 began acquiring land for a country estate, including a large farm property that had until recent years housed a private sanitorium. The main estate house was built in 1929–1931 to a design by Percy Fowler. It is a fine example of Tudor Revival architecture built out of Indiana limestone. Also built at the time were the carriage house, garden house, and pump house. It was built by the Matthews Company, a major builder in the New York/New Jersey area, and the main house resembles that of the company's owner William R. Matthews.

The estate remained in the Gallaher family until his wife's death in 1965. She bequeathed the entire estate to Gallaher's alma mater, the Stevens Institute of Technology. The institute eventually gave the property to the city, which opened it as a public park.

== See also ==
- National Register of Historic Places listings in Fairfield County, Connecticut
