= Nathan B. Lattin Farm =

Historic house in Connecticut, United States

- U.S. National Register of Historic Places
- Location within Connecticut Location within the United States
- Location: 22 Walker Hill Road, Newtown, Connecticut
- Coordinates: 41°22′11″N 73°12′37″W
- Area: 58 acres (23 ha)
- Built: 1750
- Architectural style: Colonial
- NRHP reference No.: 90000760
- Added to NRHP: May 24, 1990

The Nathan B. Lattin Farm is a historic farm at 22 Walker Hill Road in Newtown, Connecticut. Founded by early colonial settlers to the area in the 18th century, it remains an example of a rural farm property in an increasingly suburbanized area. It was listed on the National Register of Historic Places in 1990.

== Description and history ==
The Nathan Lattin Farm is located in a rural setting in southeastern Newtown, on 58 acres (23 ha) of land abutting the Halfway River, the town's border with Monroe. The property is now mostly wooded, and includes a farmhouse, a period icehouse, a 20th-century reproduction of an older barn, and the foundational remnants of other outbuildings. The farmhouse is a three-bay Colonial with a side-gable roof and a large central chimney, and is built on a fieldstone foundation. Its interior follows a typical center chimney plan, with a narrow entry hall, parlors to either side of the chimney, and the kitchen behind it. The chimney houses cooking fireplaces both in the kitchen and the basement; both feature beehive ovens made from stone, a departure from brick which is more usually found in these features. The house lacked modern amenities, including plumbing and electricity, until 1978.

The earliest documented colonial settlers of this area were the Lattins, whose name appear on a property listing in 1767. Construction methodology of the house suggests that it was built about 1750. The house is sited along what was once a major north–south road, and shows evidence of having been altered for use as an inn. The property was farmed by the Lattins until about 1897, when it was sold out of the family and adapted for use as a summer residence.

== See also ==
- National Register of Historic Places listings in Fairfield County, Connecticut
