= Enos Kellogg House =

- U.S. National Register of Historic Places
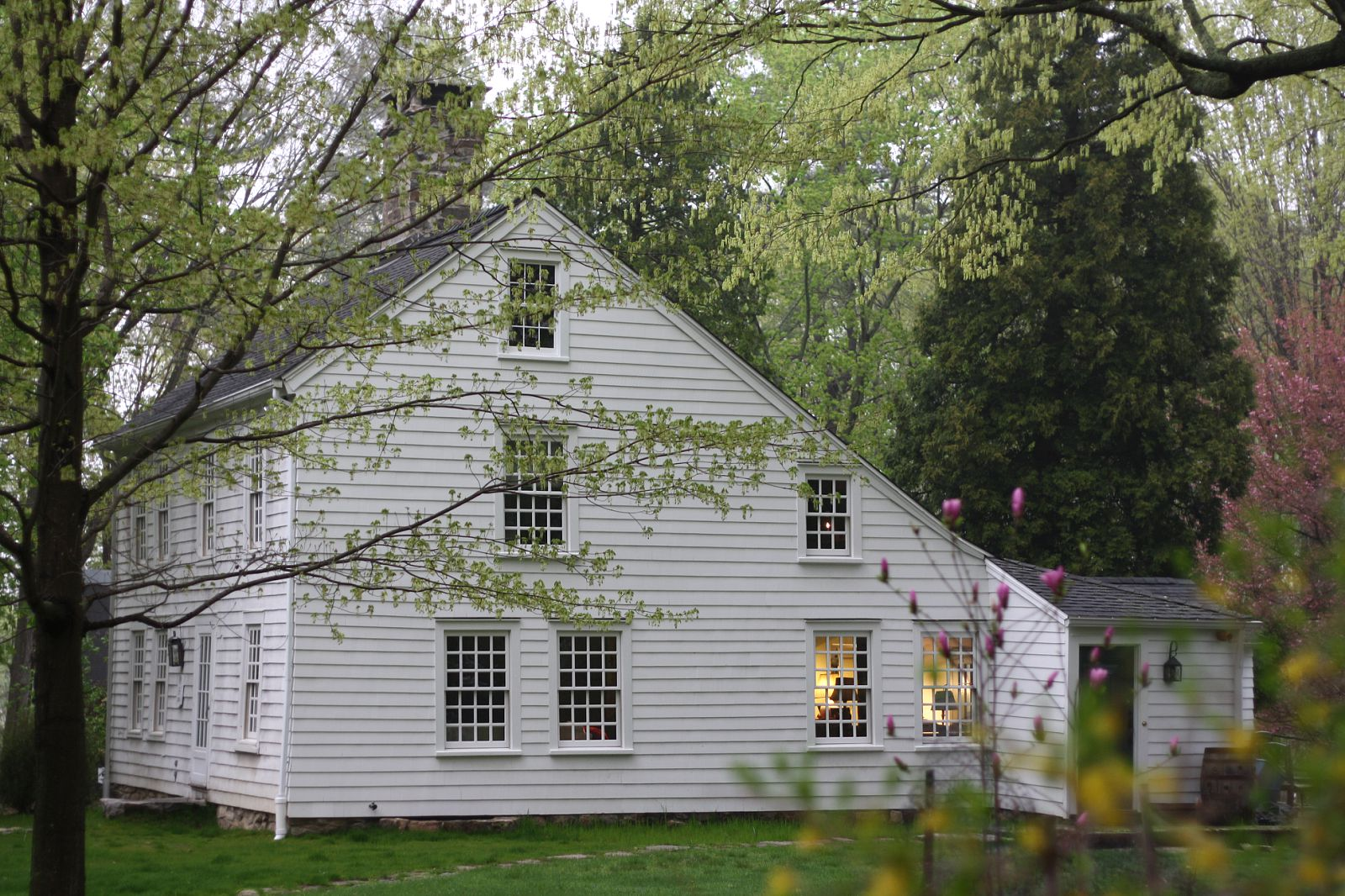

- Location within Connecticut Location within the United States
- Location: 210 Ponus Avenue Extension, Norwalk, Connecticut
- Coordinates: 41°7′56″N 73°27′26″W
- Area: 1.7 acres (0.69 ha)
- Built: 1784
- Architectural style: Colonial, New England Colonial-Saltbox
- NRHP reference No.: 12000356
- Added to NRHP: June 27, 2012

The Enos Kellogg House is a historic house at 210 Ponus Avenue Extension in Norwalk, Connecticut. Built about 1784, it is a well-preserved example of a late-18th century post-colonial saltbox style house. It was listed on the National Register of Historic Places in 2012.

== Description and history ==
The Enos Kellogg House stands in rural-residential northwestern Norwalk, on 1.7 acres (0.69 ha) bounded on the west by Ponus Avenue Extension and on the north by the Merritt Parkway. It is a 2 1/2-story timber-framed structure, with a gabled roof pierced by a large central chimney and a clapboarded exterior. Its main facade has four irregularly spaced bays, with the main entrance occupying the center-right bay, and the remaining bays on both floors occupied by sash windows. The entrance, unlike many period buildings, opens into one of the main parlors, one of three chambers on the ground floor. The central chimney is flanked by parlors, with a long room behind which originally served as a kitchen. An original board-and-batten door leads from the kitchen to a staircase (possibly once located in front of the chimney) to the second floor. The major framing of the house and decorative styles are all suggestive of late 18th-century construction with numerous alterations and extensions.

The land on which the house stands is a small part of the 16 acres (6.5 ha) which was purchased in 1784 by Enos Kellogg; the house was presumably built not long afterward. The house remained in the hands of Kellogg's descendants until 1917, when a much larger parcel, then serving as a garden nursery, was sold out of the family. In the 1930s the state took land on the north side for the construction of the Merritt Parkway, and parcels to the south were sold off for development by subsequent owners. At the time of the National Register listing in 2012, the property also included a 19th-century English barn.

== See also ==
- National Register of Historic Places listings in Fairfield County, Connecticut
