= Hoyt-Burwell-Morse House =

- U.S. National Register of Historic Places
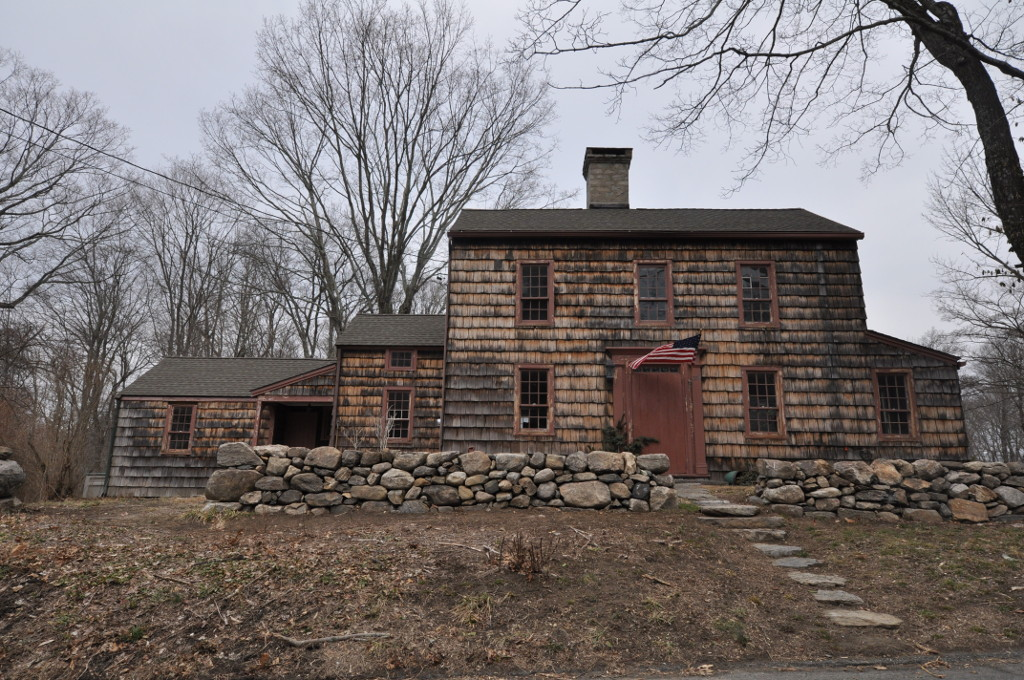
- The Hoyt-Burwell-Morse House in March 2017
- Location: 8 Ferris Hill Road, New Canaan, Connecticut
- Built: 1740
- Architectural style: Saltbox
- NRHP reference No.: 100000594
- Added to NRHP: December 13, 2016

The Hoyt-Burwell-Morse House is a historic house located at 8 Ferris Hill Road in New Canaan, Connecticut. Built before 1740, the home is one of the 15 oldest extant buildings in the town of New Canaan. The home is an example of traditional New England 18th-century Saltbox architecture. In the 19th century, the house was home to an African-American man named Onesimus Brown, who is thought to be the last living person born into slavery in Connecticut. In 2016, the home was slated for demolition, but was purchased by local preservationists and eventually listed on the National Register of Historic Places that same year.

== See also ==
- National Register of Historic Places listings in Fairfield County, Connecticut
