= Five Mile River Landing Historic District =

Historic district in Connecticut, United States

Coordinates: 41°4′12.97″N 73°26′34.82″W

- U.S. National Register of Historic Places
- U.S. Historic district
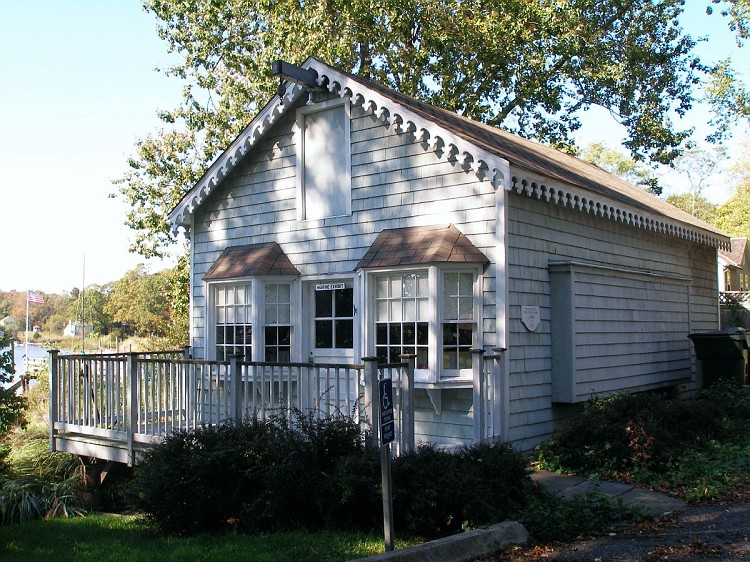
- The Pinkney Park Boathouse

- Location within Connecticut Location within the United States
- Location: Rowayton Avenue to Jo's Barn Way, Norwalk, Connecticut
- Area: 7.2 acres (2.9 ha)
- NRHP reference No.: 08001189
- Added to NRHP: September 23, 2009

The Five Mile River Landing Historic District encompasses a predominantly 19th-century residential area in the Rowayton section of Norwalk, Connecticut. It extends along Rowayton Avenue from Witch Lane to Pennoyer Street, and includes all of the properties on the latter as well. The area was a major local center of the shipping industry in the 19th century. The historic district was listed on the National Register of Historic Places in 2009.

== Description and history ==
The Five Mile River Landing area is located in the heart of Norwalk's Rowayton area, in the far southwest of the city, on the eastern bank of the Five Mile River, which separates Norwalk from Darien. The historic district is roughly linear, extending from Witch Lane in the north to a triangular traffic island at Wilson Avenue in the south, and then easterly on Pennoyer Street. This area is reflective of the area's early settlement pattern, and contains a diversity of residential architectural styles of the 19th century. It also includes Pinkney Park, where the site of a period shipyard can be found, a boathouse now on the park grounds, the Rowayton Methodist Church, and a building original constructed as a hotel.

The Rowayton area was settled by English colonists early in the 18th century, and was largely agricultural for most of that century. In the 19th century, the harvesting of oysters developed as an industry, and the shipyard established at what is now Pinkney Park was founded in the early 19th century. Oystering reached its peak in the second half of the 19th century, when the village began to develop as a summer resort area. Vacationing New Yorkers were boarded in local houses, and the Rowayton Hotel was opened c. 1848 to serve a larger influx of tourists. The streetcar was introduced to Rowayton in 1890, beginning the transformation of the area into a more suburban area for workers employed in South Norwalk. The residential architecture of the district is reflective of these phases of the area's development.

== See also ==
- National Register of Historic Places listings in Fairfield County, Connecticut
