= Lewis June House =

Historic house in Connecticut, United States

- U.S. National Register of Historic Places
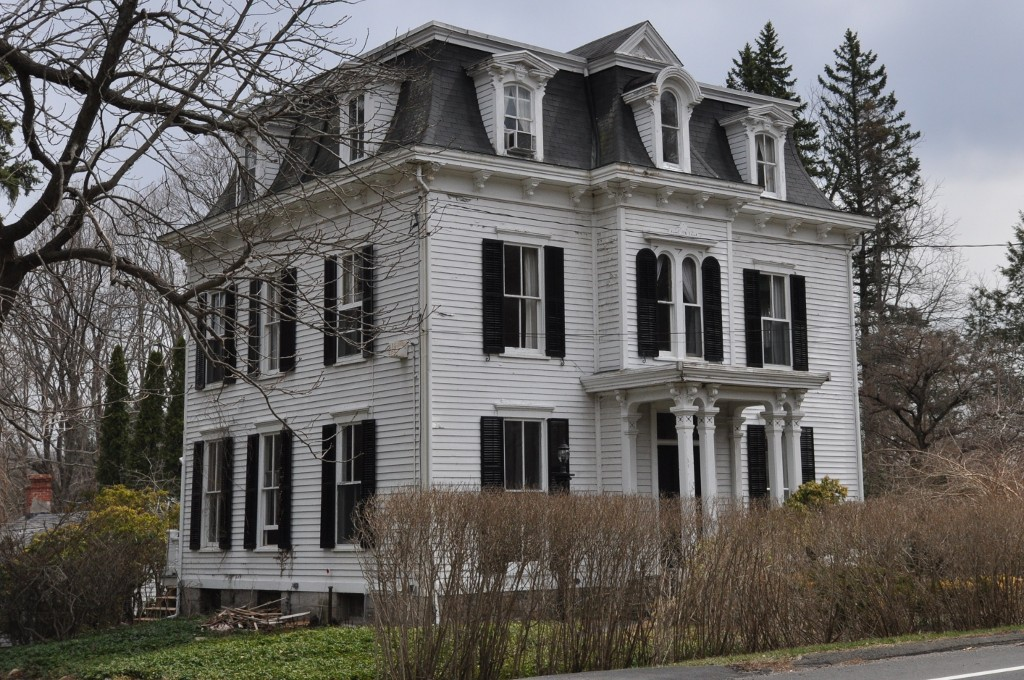

- Location within Connecticut Location within the United States
- Location: 478 North Salem Road, Ridgefield, Connecticut
- Coordinates: 41°19′0″N 73°30′47″W
- Area: 2.8 acres (1.1 ha)
- Built: 1865
- Architectural style: Second Empire
- NRHP reference No.: 84000795
- Added to NRHP: February 16, 1984

The Lewis June House, also known as the Scott House, is a historic house at 478 North Salem Road in Ridgefield, Connecticut, USA. Built c. 1865, it is one of a small number of Second Empire houses in Ridgefield, and its best-preserved and most elaborate example of the style. The house was listed on the National Register of Historic Places in 1984.

== Description and history ==
The Lewis June House stands in a rural-residential area about 2 miles (3.2 km) north of Ridgefield's village center, on the east side of North Salem Road, a short way south of Barlow Mountain Road. It is a wood-frame structure, 2 1/2 stories in height, with a mansard roof pierced by gabled dormers with elaborate trim. The eaves are studded with elaboheavy decorative brackets. The center bay of the main facade projects, and a single-story porch extends further, supported by groups of square columns, with decorative capitals and bracketing. The window above the porch has a pair of round-topped windows, with projecting cornice above supported by small brackets. The interior retains many original features and finishes, including the central staircase and the fireplace surround in the main parlor.

Lewis June, for whom the house was built, purchased the land in this area in 1831, and supposedly built this house as a replacement for the original homestead, which was destroyed by fire. June was involved in the circus business, and wintered some of his circus ponies on the property. The house originally had a rear wing, which was moved c. 1940 (along with a barn that stood on the property) to become part of a nearby house.

== See also ==
- National Register of Historic Places listings in Fairfield County, Connecticut
