= Isaac Davis and Marion Dalton Hall House =

- U.S. National Register of Historic Places
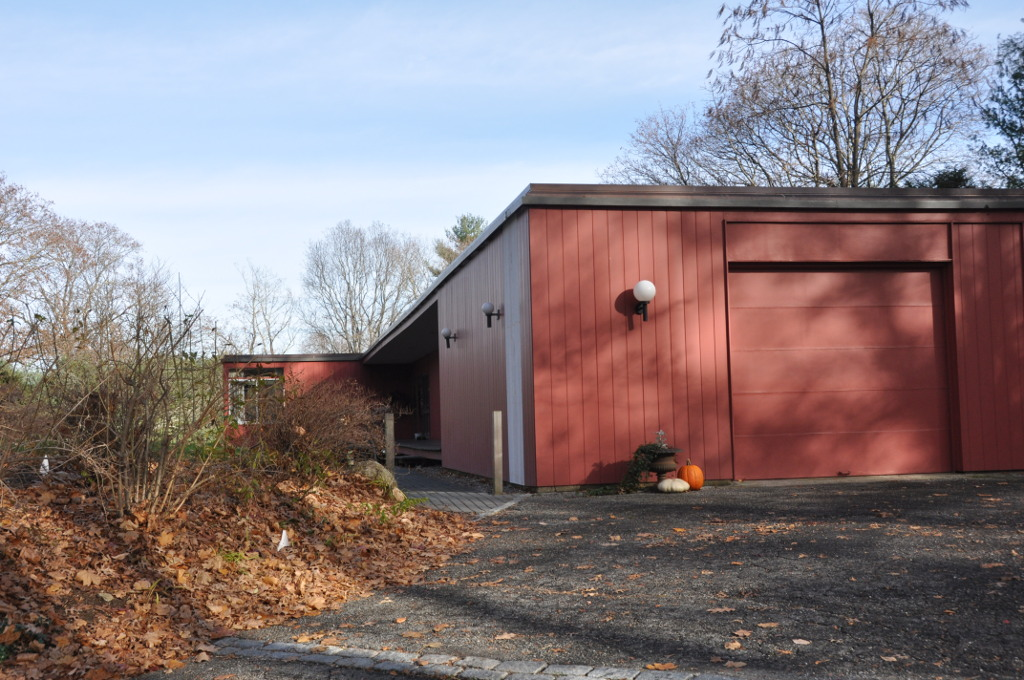

- Location within Connecticut Location within the United States
- Location: 25 Lambert Road, New Canaan, Connecticut
- Coordinates: 41°9′35″N 73°30′10″W
- Area: 1 acre (0.40 ha)
- Built: 1962
- Architect: Pedersen, William F.; et al.
- Architectural style: Modern Movement
- MPS: Mid-Twentieth-Century Modern REsidences in Connecticut 1930-1979, MPS
- NRHP reference No.: 10000573
- Added to NRHP: September 16, 2010

The Isaac Davis and Marion Dalton Hall House is a historic house at 25 Lambert Road in New Canaan, Connecticut. Built in 1962 for a local lawyer, it is one of two houses in the community designed by local architect William F. Pederson, and is part of its significant collection of Mid-Century Modern architecture. It was listed on the National Register of Historic Places in 2010.

== Description and history ==
The Hall House is located in a suburban residential setting north of the village center of New Canaan, on the south side of Lambert Road just east of Oenoke Ridge. It is a basically single-story frame structure, set on a gently sloping hillside that exposes a full basement level on the northeast side. The house is basically rectangular in form, with an interior courtyard separating the garage from the main house, which are connected by covered breezeways. The exterior is finished with vertical tongue-in-groove boards, with extensive use of glass on the private northern southern elevations. It is covered by a flat roof. The interior retains many period finishes, including oak floors, exposed roof beams, and builtin cabinetry.

The house was built in 1962 for Isaac Davis Hall, a local lawyer, and his wife Marion Dalton Hall. It was designed by William F. Pederson, a local architect best known for doing commercial and institutional designs; this house and one other in New Canaan are his only known residential designs in Connecticut. The Hall family lived in the house for fifteen years, and one of the couple's daughters was married on the property.

== See also ==
- National Register of Historic Places listings in Fairfield County, Connecticut
