= John Osborne House =

Historic house in Connecticut, United States

- U.S. National Register of Historic Places
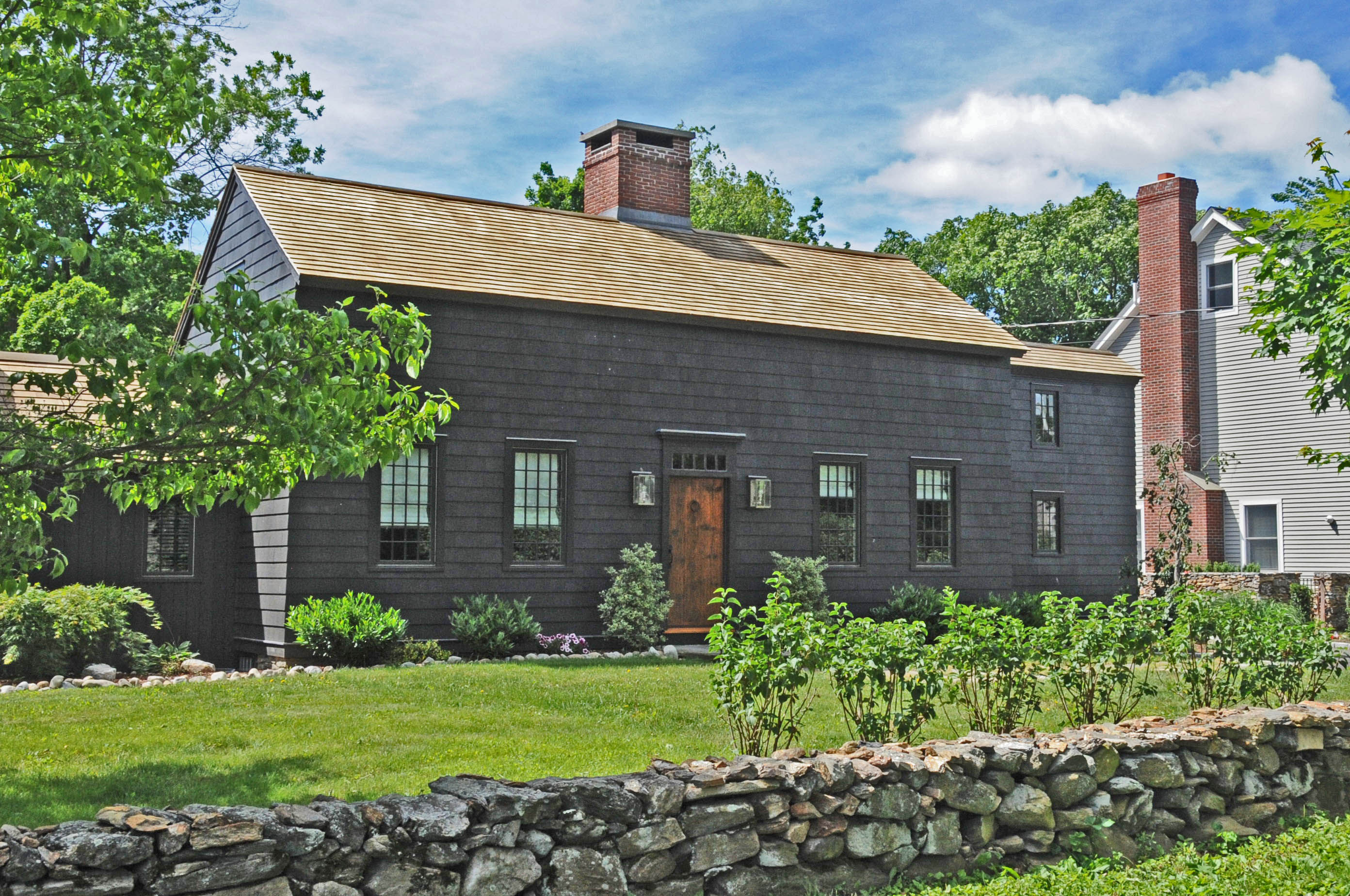

- Location within Connecticut Location within the United States
- Location: 909 King's Highway West, Fairfield, Connecticut
- Coordinates: 41.13722°N 73.29525°W
- Area: less than one acre
- Built: 1734
- Architect: Osborne, John
- NRHP reference No.: 87000118
- Added to NRHP: February 12, 1987

The John Osborne House is a historic house at 909 King's Highway West in Fairfield, Connecticut. It was built in 1734, according to the tax records. It was listed on the National Register of Historic Places in 1987. The house is architecturally significant as an early colonial era house whose intact framing is somewhat unusual in its non-conformance to supposed patterns. Exact age of the house is unclear. There are suggestions the house may have been built as early as 1673.

It is located adjacent to what was the Pequot Swamp, site of the last battle of the Pequot War of 1637. The house may be located on an 80-acre grant of land to Richard Osborne, father of John Osborne, for his services in that war.

== See also ==
- National Register of Historic Places listings in Fairfield County, Connecticut
