= Pine Creek Park Bridge =

- U.S. National Register of Historic Places
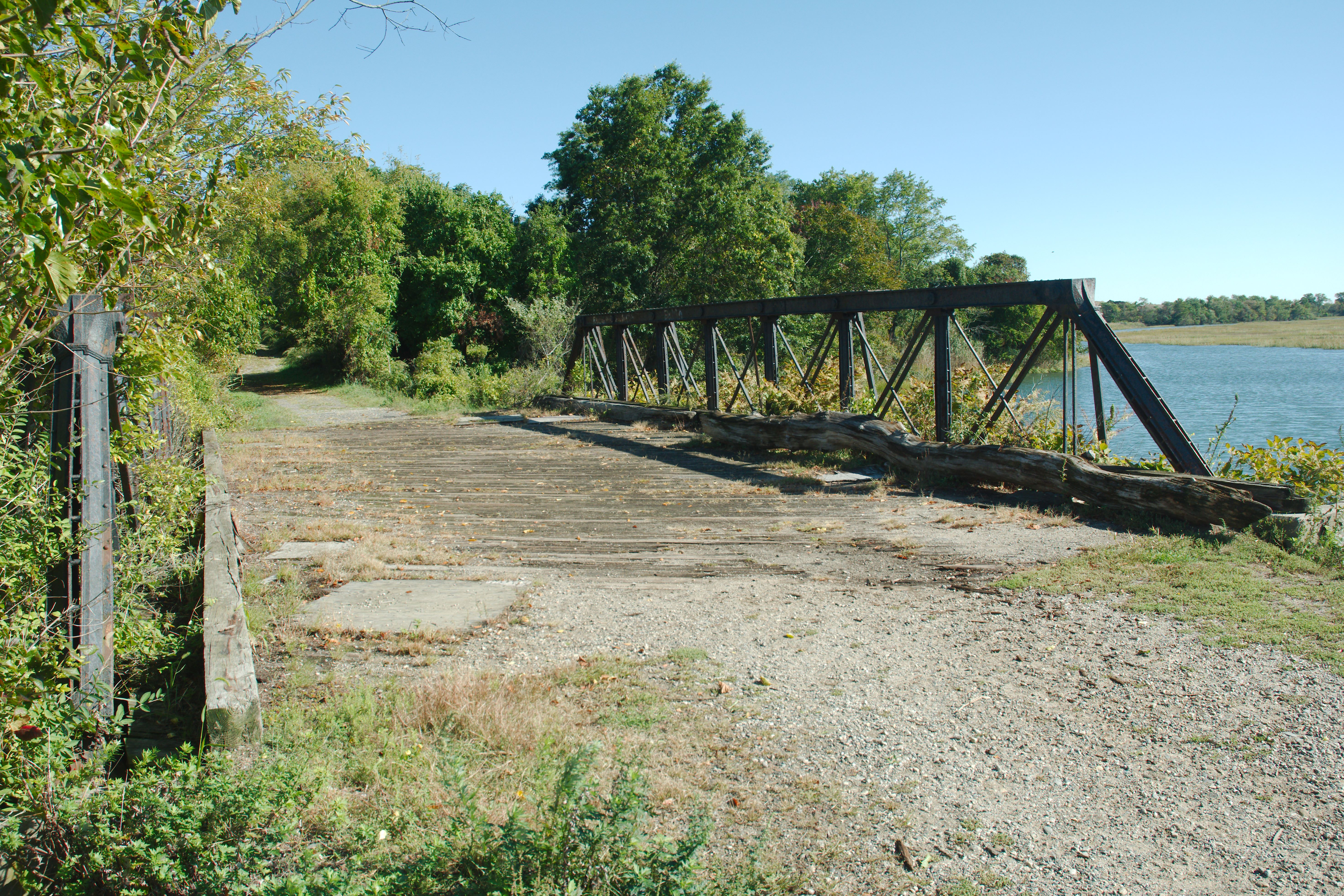

- Location within Connecticut Location within the United States
- Location: North of Old Dam Road; Over Pine Creek, Fairfield, Connecticut
- Coordinates: 41°7′31″N 73°15′48″W
- Area: less than one acre
- Built: 1872
- Architect: Keystone Bridge Co.; Linville, J.H.
- Architectural style: Pratt pony truss bridge
- NRHP reference No.: 92000263
- Added to NRHP: April 8, 1992

The Pine Creek Park Bridge, also known as the Mill Hill Road Bridge, is a Pratt pony truss bridge in Fairfield, Connecticut. Built in 1872, it was listed on the National Register of Historic Places in 1992. It is 54 feet (16 m) in length, and is located in conservation land on Pine Creek, having been moved there in 1979 from its original location on Mill Hill Road. It is significant as a rare example of an early iron bridge, from an era when bridge designs were changing and unsettled. It was produced by the Keystone Bridge Company of Pittsburgh, Pennsylvania, and is one of few surviving ones made by its engineer J. H. Linville.

== See also ==
- National Register of Historic Places listings in Fairfield County, Connecticut
- List of bridges on the National Register of Historic Places in Connecticut
