= Ephraim Wheeler House =

Historic house in Connecticut, United States

- U.S. National Register of Historic Places
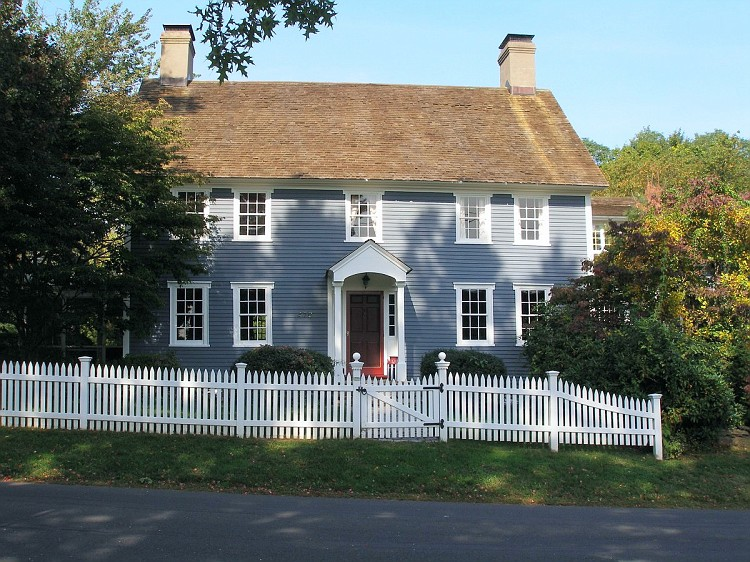

- Location within Connecticut Location within the United States
- Location: 470 Whippoorwill Lane, Stratford, Connecticut
- Coordinates: 41°15′11.3″N 73°6′55.35″W
- Architectural style: Colonial
- NRHP reference No.: 92000318
- Added to NRHP: April 17, 1992

The Ephraim Wheeler House is a historic house at 470 Whippoorwill Lane in Stratford, Connecticut. Probably built in 1743, it is a distinctive example of a rural agricultural farmstead in the community, with a number of features not found in surviving buildings of comparable age. The house was listed on the National Register of Historic Places in 1992.

== Description and history ==
The Ephraim Wheeler House stands in what is now a suburban residential area of Stratford's Putney neighborhood, on the north side of Whippoorwill Lane at its junction with Rosebrook Drive. It is a 2 1/2-story wood-frame structure, five bays wide, with twin chimneys, shingled exterior, and a side-gable roof. Small additions added in the 19th and 20th centuries expand the building to three sides. The main entrance is flanked by sidelight windows and sheltered by a small gable-roofed portico with round columns. The interior follows a central hall plan, and retains original features, particularly the fine Georgian woodwork of the main hall and stair.

The house was probably built in 1743, the year of Ephraim Wheeler's marriage, and remained in the Wheeler family in the early 20th century. The Wheelers, in addition to farming the surrounding land, operated a grist mill and engaged in other business pursuits. The house is particularly distinctive for its period because it was built with twin chimneys rather than the more typical large central chimney, and because the fireplaces are set in the corners; these features are unusual in the town even in the early 19th century.

== See also ==
- National Register of Historic Places listings in Fairfield County, Connecticut
