= Joseph Loth Company Building =

- U.S. National Register of Historic Places
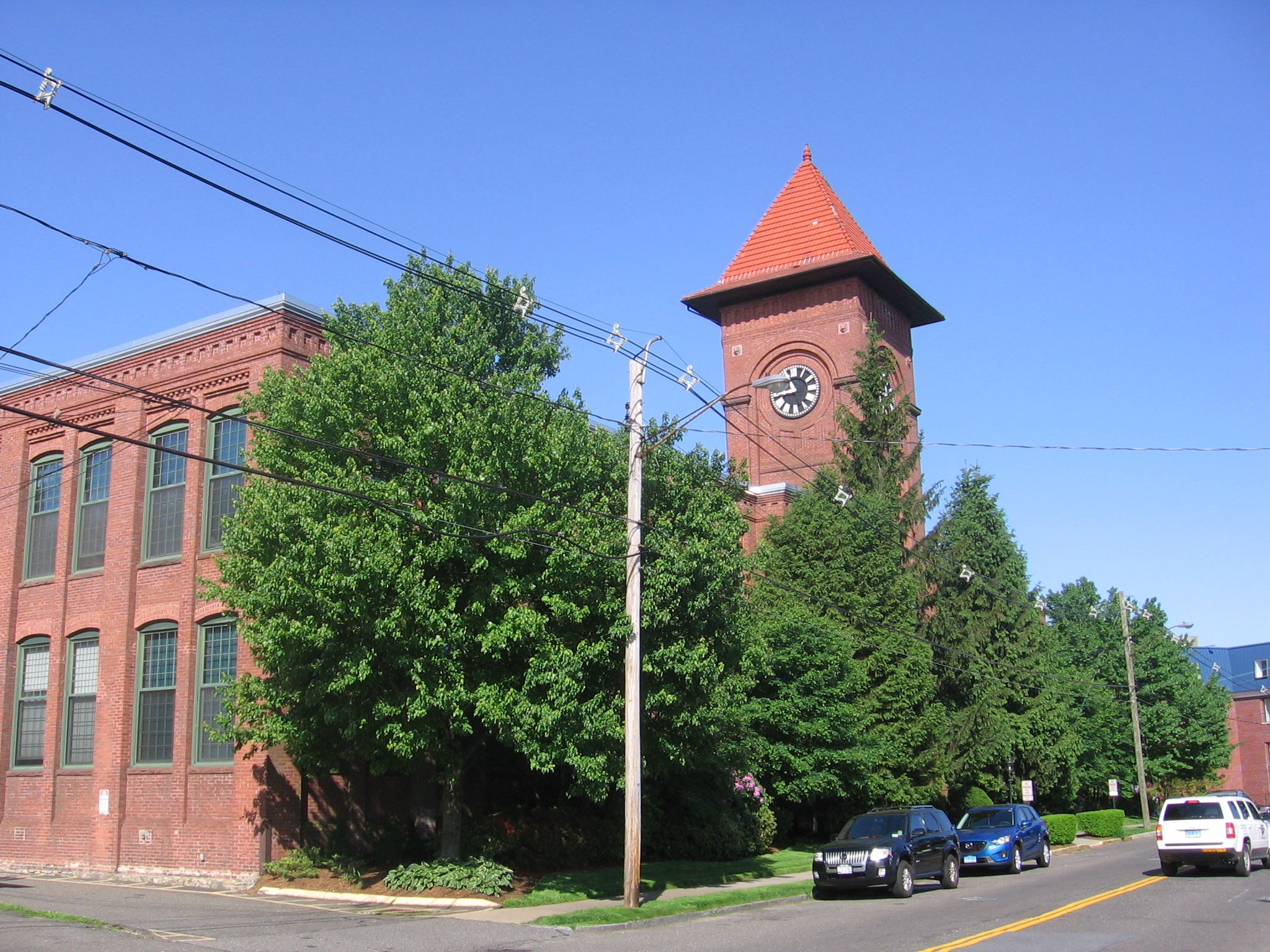
- building on May 18, 2012

- Location within Connecticut Location within the United States
- Location: 25 Grand Street, Norwalk, Connecticut
- Coordinates: 41.1247°N 73.4238°W
- Area: 2.3 acres (0.93 ha)
- Built: 1903
- Architect: Green, Samuel M.
- Architectural style: Romanesque, Neo-Romanesque
- NRHP reference No.: 84000804
- Added to NRHP: May 17, 1984

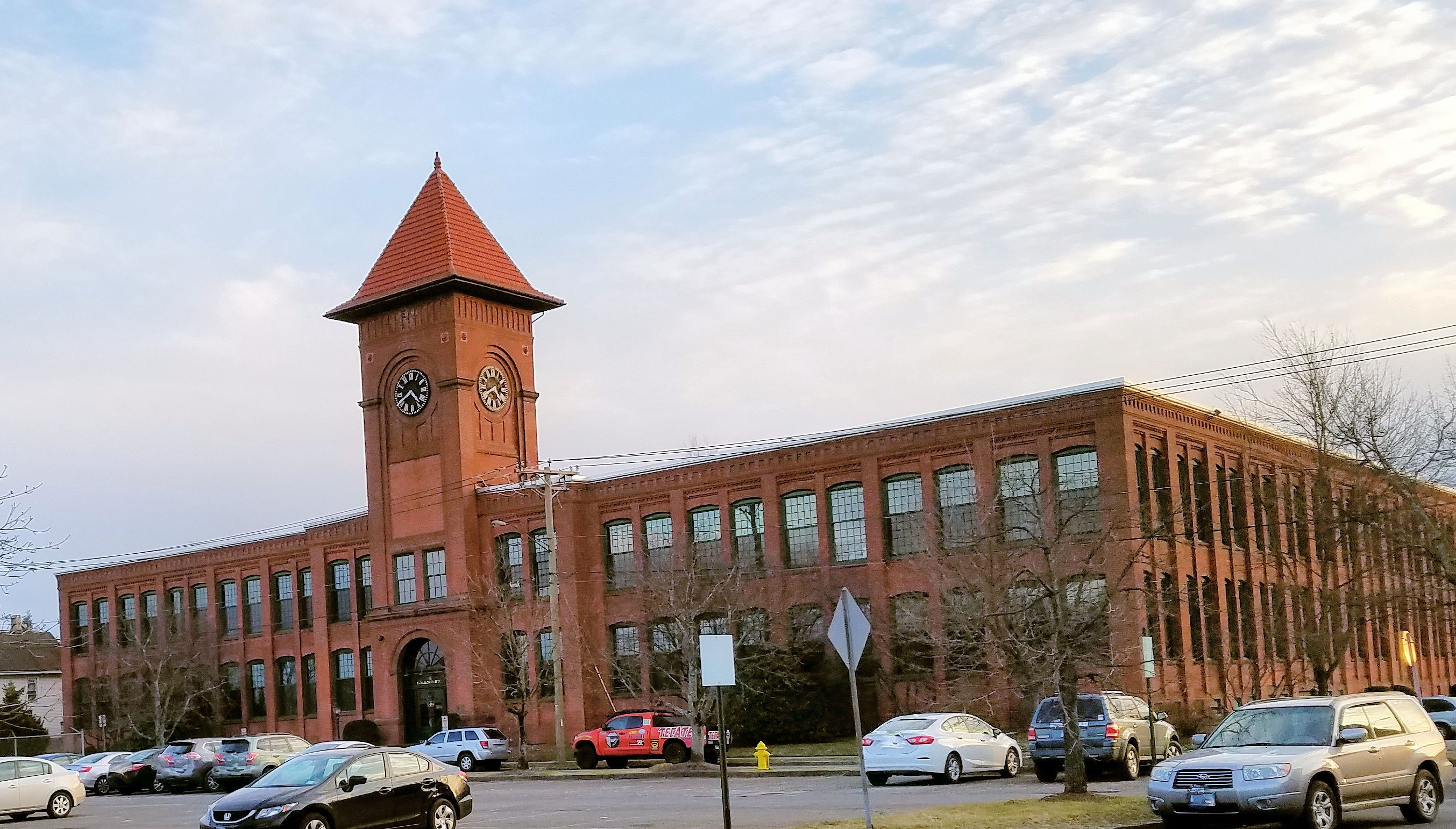
Clocktower Close, 25 Grand Street, Norwalk, CT

The Joseph Loth Company Building is a historic industrial building at 25 Grand Street in Norwalk, Connecticut. It is a two-story brick Romanesque Revival structure with a four-story clock tower. The rear of the building has been altered by the addition of modern concrete sections in the 1950s. Built in 1903, it is a well-preserved example of industrial architecture of the period, and is a local landmark.

The building was listed on the National Register of Historic Places on May 17, 1984.

== See also ==
- National Register of Historic Places listings in Fairfield County, Connecticut
