= Restmore =

Historic house in Connecticut, United States

- U.S. National Register of Historic Places
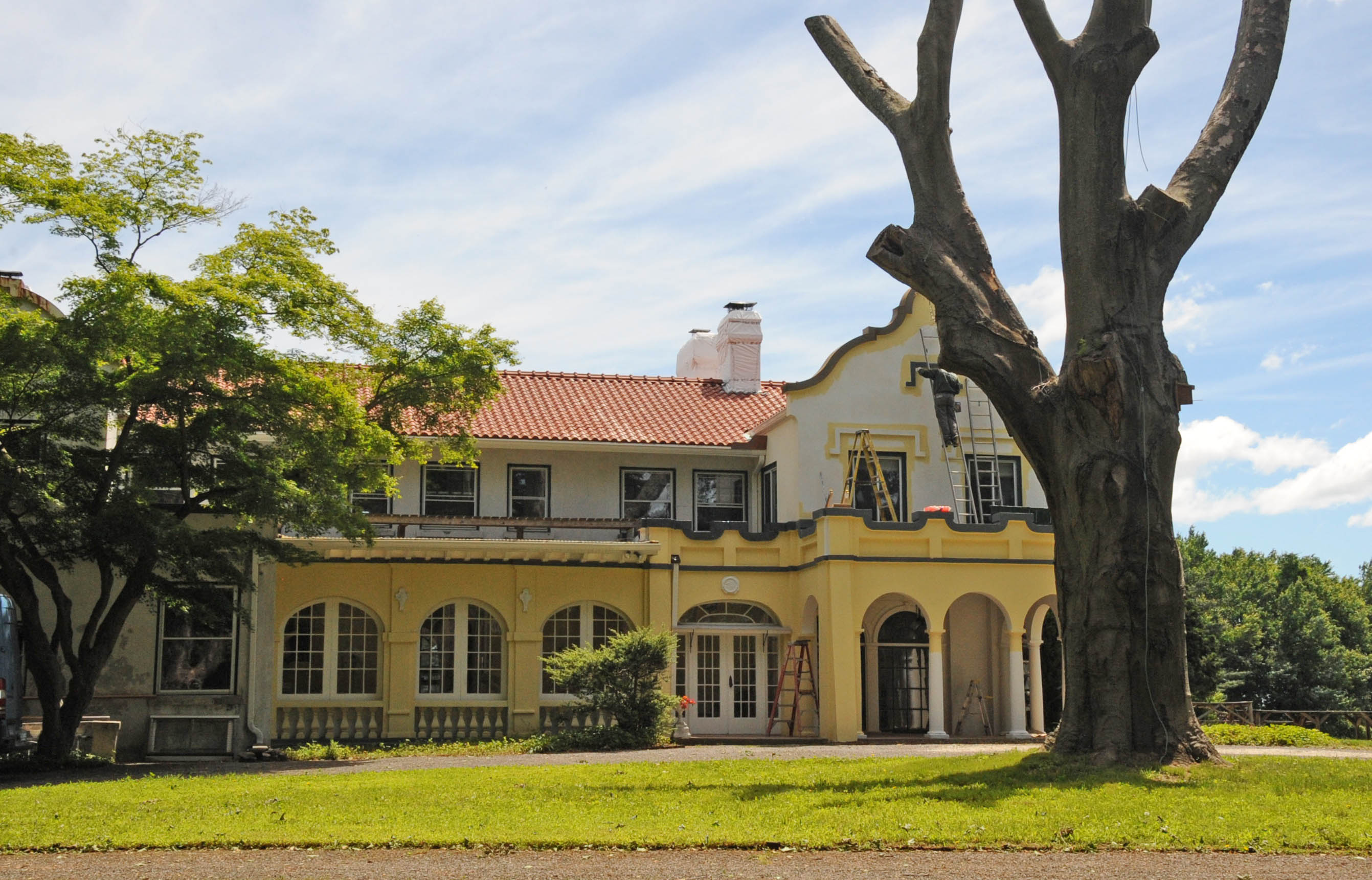

- Location within Connecticut Location within the United States
- Location: 375 Warner Hill Road, Fairfield, Connecticut
- Coordinates: 41°9′20″N 73°16′47.5″W
- Area: 4.5 acres (1.8 ha)
- NRHP reference No.: 09000467
- Added to NRHP: July 1, 2010

Restmore is a historic mansion at 375 Warner Hill Road in Fairfield, Connecticut. It is an 11-room steel and stucco structure, built in 1911-12 by Ira DeVer Warner, a Bridgeport industrialist who owned the Warner Brothers Corset Company. Warner purchased 200 acres (81 ha) of land, built this house as a summer estate, and ran a dairy farm on the remaining land (most of which has since been sold off).

The property was listed on the National Register of Historic Places on July 1, 2010.

As of 2025, it remains a private residence.

== See also ==
- National Register of Historic Places listings in Fairfield County, Connecticut
