= National Hall Historic District =

Historic district in Connecticut, United States

- U.S. National Register of Historic Places
- U.S. Historic district
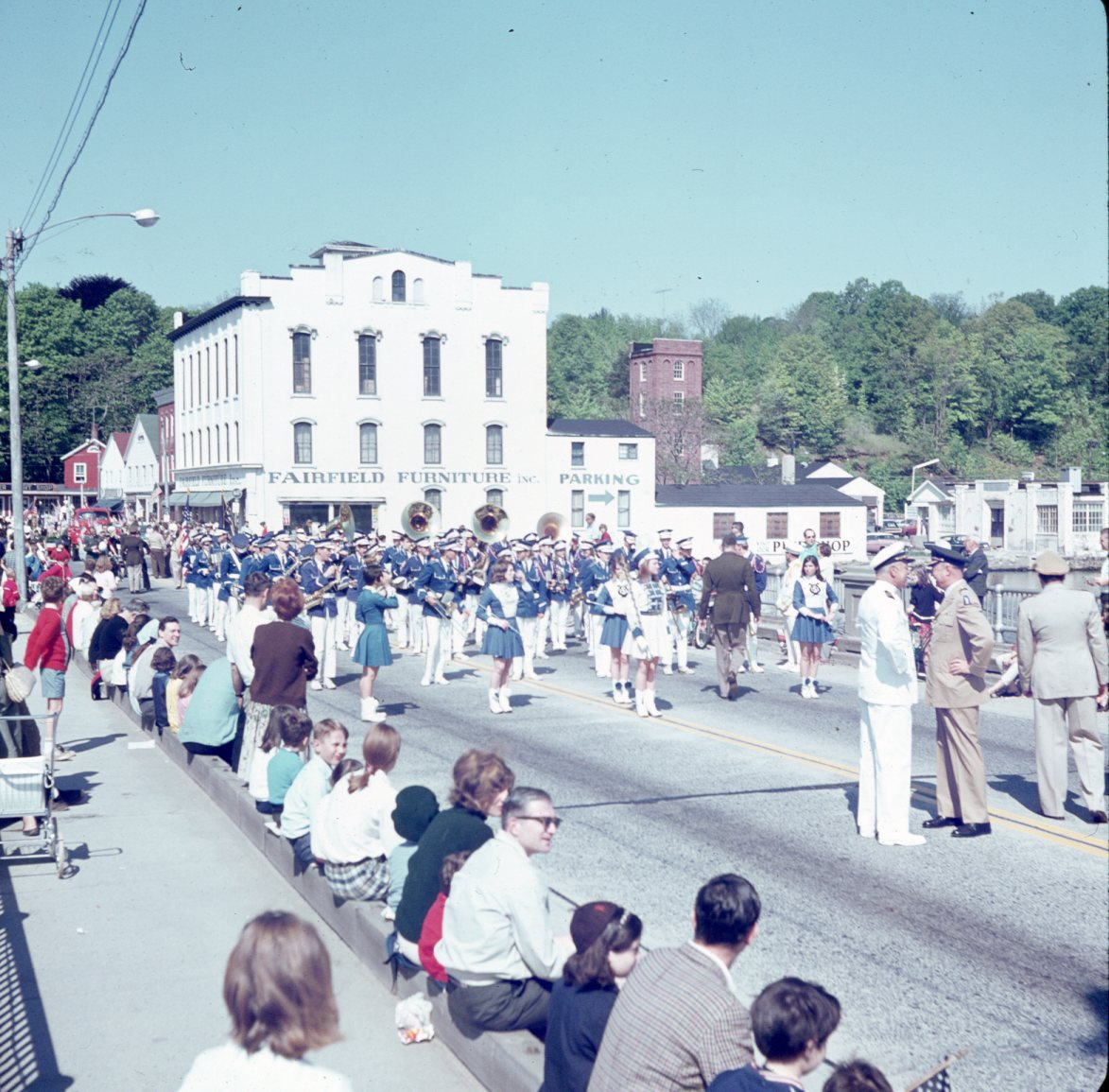

- Location within Connecticut Location within the United States
- Location: Riverside Avenue, Wilton and Post Roads, Westport, Connecticut
- Coordinates: 41°8′25″N 73°21′54″W
- Area: 3 acres (1.2 ha)
- Architectural style: Greek Revival, Federal, Italianate
- NRHP reference No.: 84000812
- Added to NRHP: September 13, 1984

The National Hall Historic District is a 3-acre (1.2 ha) historic district in Westport, Connecticut that was listed on the National Register of Historic Places in 1984. The district encompasses a historic commercial center of the town, located on the west bank of the Saugatuck River where the Boston Post Road crosses the river. It includes eleven historic structures, most of which historically had some sort of commercial function. There are a few residences, and one civic structure, the wood-frame Vigilante Fire House on Wilton Road. The centerpiece of the district is the large National Hall building, an 1873 three-story Italianate structure that visually dominates the junction of the Post Road with Wilton Road and Reservoir Road. The area's first period of development was in the early 19th century, a period from which five buildings survive.

== See also ==
- National Register of Historic Places listings in Fairfield County, Connecticut
