= Westport Bank and Trust Company =

- U.S. National Register of Historic Places
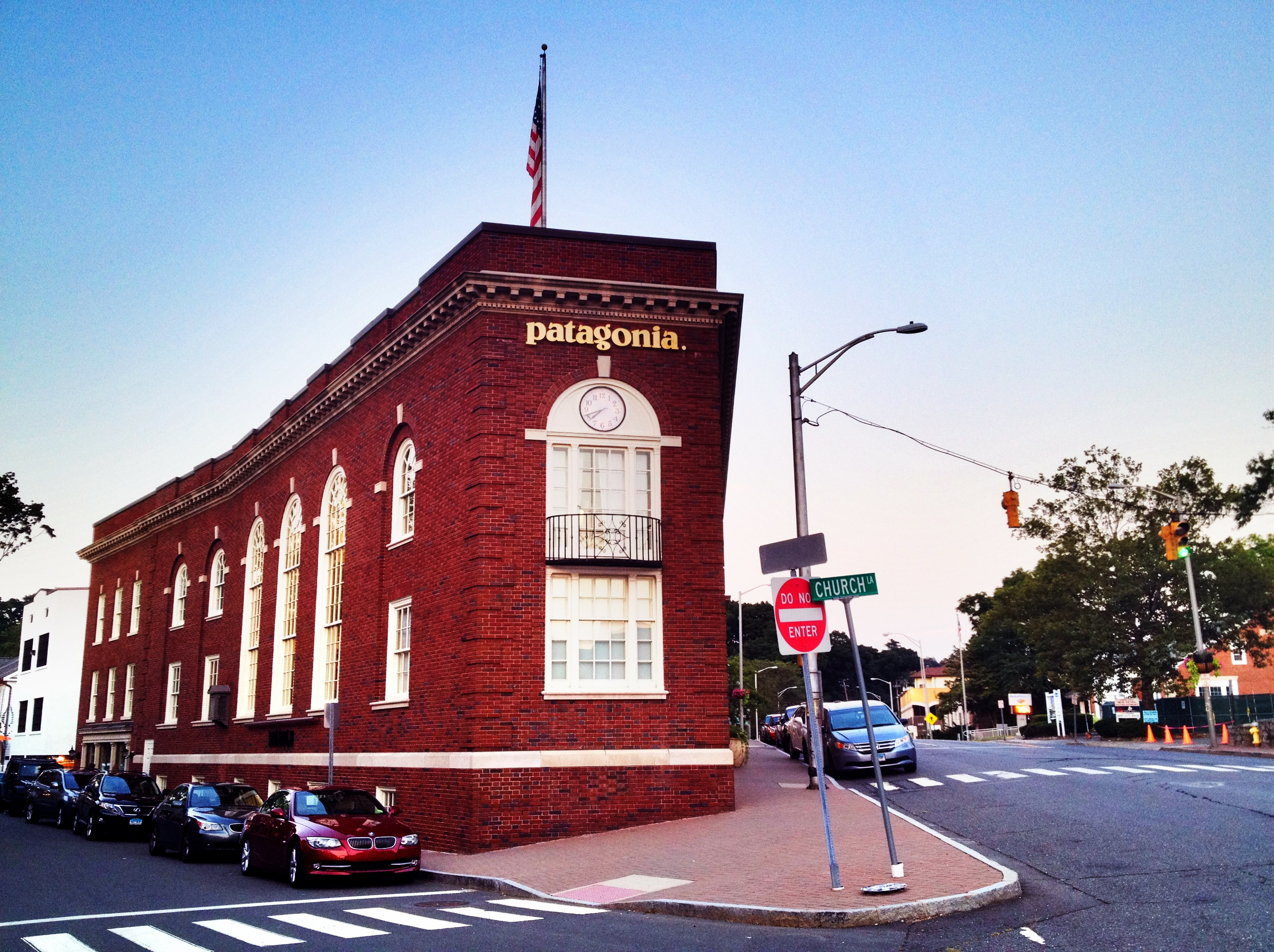
- Westport Bank and Trust Company, Westport, CT

- Location within Connecticut Location within the United States
- Location: 87 Post Road East, Westport, Connecticut
- Coordinates: 41°8′30″N 73°21′40″W
- Area: less than one acre
- Built: 1924
- Architect: Cutler, Charles E.
- Architectural style: Classical Revival
- NRHP reference No.: 06000593
- Added to NRHP: November 6, 2006

The Westport Bank and Trust Company is a historic commercial building at 87 Post Road East in Westport, Connecticut. It is a two-story Classical Revival brick building, designed by local architect Charles E. Cutler and built in 1924. The bank was founded in 1852 by Horace Staples, a prominent local businessman, and was a longtime fixture in the local economy. The building is notable for its architecture, and for a series of murals in its lobby, commissioned in the 1960s and executed by Robert L. Lambdin, an artist best known for his Depression-era work funded by the Works Progress Administration.

The building was listed on the National Register of Historic Places on November 6, 2006.

== See also ==
- National Register of Historic Places listings in Fairfield County, Connecticut
