= Elinor and Sherman Ford House =

- U.S. National Register of Historic Places
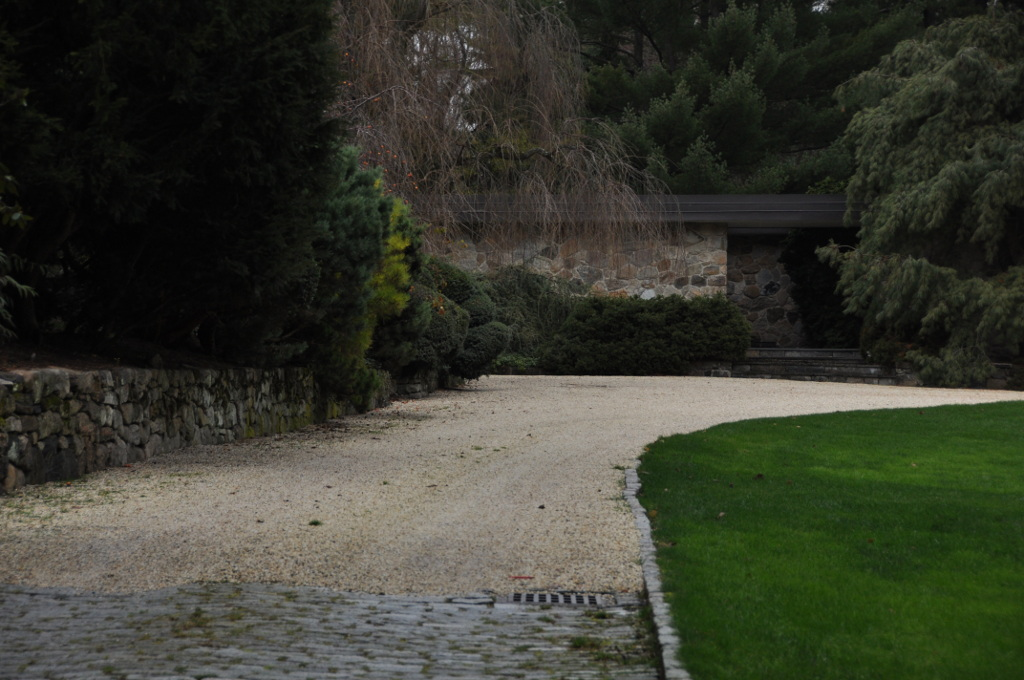

- Location within Connecticut Location within the United States
- Location: 55 Talmadge Hill Road, New Canaan, Connecticut
- Coordinates: 41°6′51″N 73°29′29″W
- Area: 5.2 acres (2.1 ha)
- Built: 1952
- Architect: Gates & Ford; et al.
- Architectural style: Modern Movement
- MPS: Mid-Twentieth-Century Modern REsidences in Connecticut 1930-1979, MPS
- NRHP reference No.: 10000574
- Added to NRHP: September 16, 2010

The Elinor and Sherman Ford House is a historic house at 55 Talmadge Hill Road in New Canaan, Connecticut. Built in 1952 for the parents of architect Russell Ford, the house is a good local example of Mid-Century Modern architecture. It was listed on the National Register of Historic Places in 2010.

== Description and history ==
The Ford House is located in southern New Canaan, in a residential setting on the north side of Tallmadge Hill Road west of Mansfield Avenue. The house is set on a landscaped 5.2 acres (2.1 ha), accompanied by a period guesthouse and pool house. The main house is a low single-story structure, built with a wood frame and clad in a combination of floor-to-ceiling glass, vertical board siding painted a dark brown, and fieldstone which sometimes extends into stone walls on the property. It is divided into three sections, with wings on the east and west sides of the main block, each having a roof line slightly higher than the main block. The east side of the house is more private, while the west side features more glass in order to engage the outside living spaces of the landscaping.

The house was built in 1952-54 for Elinor and Sherman Ford, the parents of architect Russell Ford, who was a partner in the firm Gates and Ford that designed it. It is one of five houses in New Canaan designed by the firm. The house was built on the site of a farmhouse which stood on the property when the Fords purchased it in 1940. The landscaping of the property, completed in 1963, was designed by Fride Stege, one of the few known female landscape designers working in independent practice at the time.

== See also ==
- National Register of Historic Places listings in Fairfield County, Connecticut
