= Abijah Comstock House =

Historic house in Connecticut, United States

- U.S. National Register of Historic Places
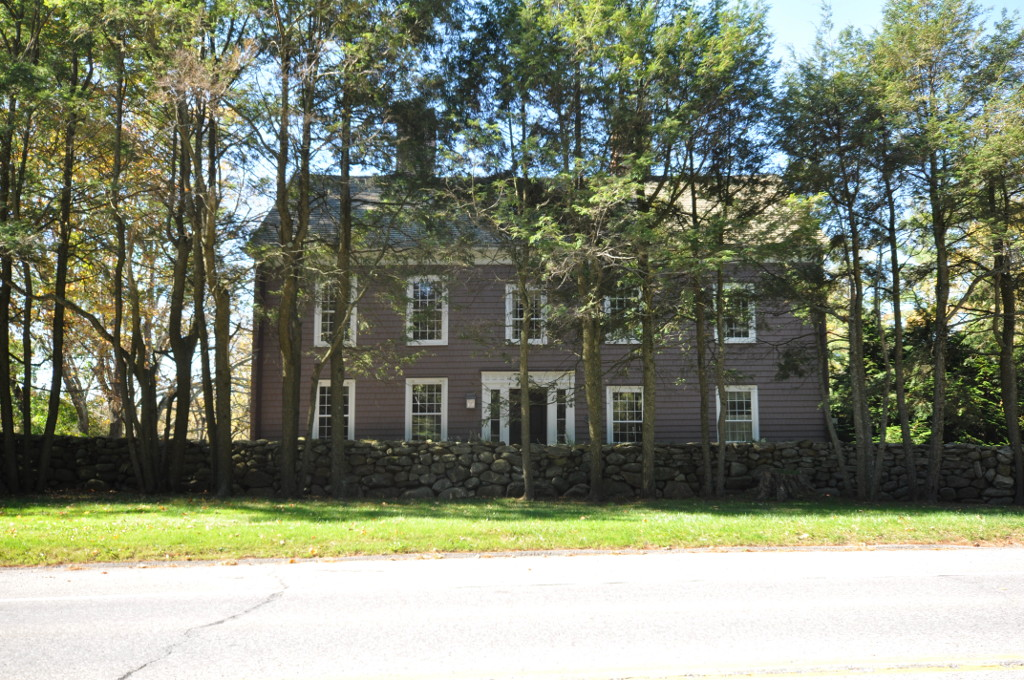

- Location within Connecticut Location within the United States
- Location: 1328 Smith Ridge Road, New Canaan, Connecticut
- Coordinates: 41°11′53″N 73°30′29″W
- Area: 2 acres (0.81 ha)
- Built: c. 1779, c. 1810
- Architectural style: Georgian; Federal
- NRHP reference No.: 100001731
- Added to NRHP: October 16, 2017

The Abijah Comstock House is a historic house at 1328 Smith Ridge Road in New Canaan, Connecticut, United States. Built about 1779 and enlarged about 1810, it is a good example of high-style Federal period architecture. It is also significant for its documented history as the home of a slave owner. The house was listed on the National Register of Historic Places in 2017.

== Description and history ==
The Abijah Comstock House stands in northern New Canaan, on the west side of Smith Ridge Road not far from the New York state line. The 2-acre (0.81 ha) property includes the main house and a 19th-century bank barn, as well as a number of period stone walls. The house is a 2 1/2-story timber-frame structure, with a gabled roof and clapboarded exterior. The main facade is five bays wide, with a roughly centered front entry flanked by asymmetrically placed sash windows. The entry is flanked by sidelight windows and pilasters, which rise to support a simple cornice. The interior follows a central hall plan, with kitchen and informal dining spaces to the right and formal living spaces to the left. The spaces on the left in particular include well-preserved examples of high quality Federal period workmanship.

The land on which the house stands was purchased by Abijah Comstock in 1754, with tradition holding that the oldest part of the house, its right three bays, was not erected until about 1770, the year his wife died. The house was enlarged about 1810 by Abijah's son Samuel. The earliest record that the Comstocks owned slaves is a description of a visit to the house in 1772 by a local minister. Census and estate records indicate that the family owned at least four slaves during Connecticut's period of gradual emancipation, roughly 1784–1848. One slave, named Cesar, left a will in which his inventory included a bible and a variety of small silver valuables.

== See also ==
- National Register of Historic Places listings in Fairfield County, Connecticut
