= Meadowlands (Darien, Connecticut) =

Historic house in Connecticut, United States

- U.S. National Register of Historic Places
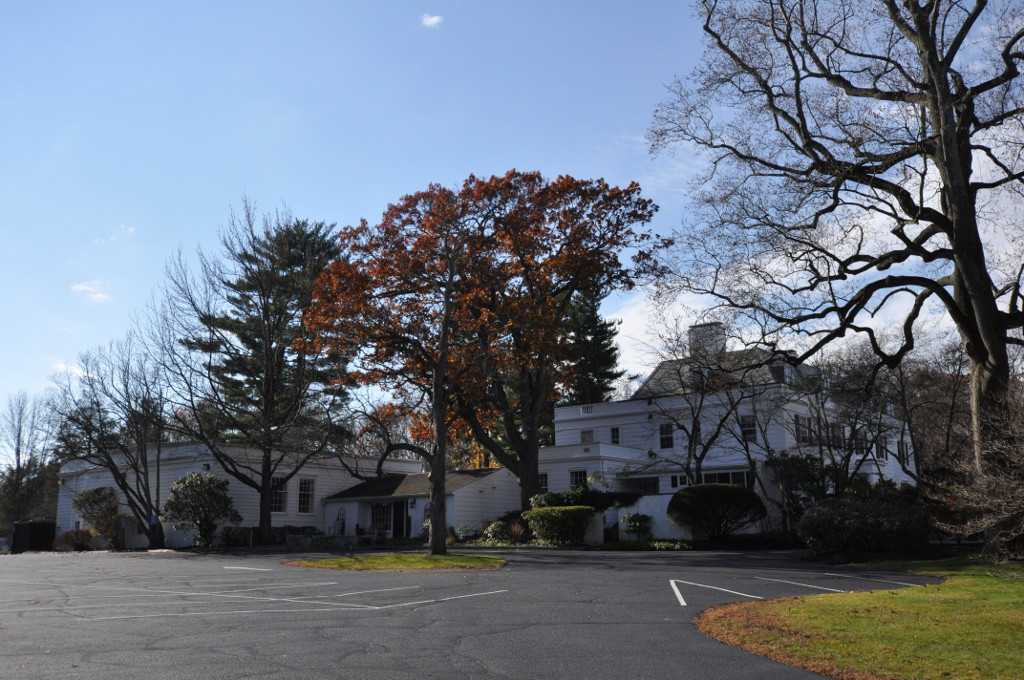

- Location within Connecticut Location within the United States
- Location: 274 Middlesex Road, Darien, Connecticut
- Coordinates: 41°4′43″N 73°29′12″W
- Area: 6.4 acres (2.6 ha)
- Built: 1876
- Architect: 1933 complete remodel by Tarpley, Donald G.; Shipman, Ellen Biddle
- Architectural style: Georgian Colonial Revival
- NRHP reference No.: 87001408
- Added to NRHP: October 6, 1987

Meadowlands, at 274 Middlesex Road in Darien, Connecticut, USA, also known as DCA Meadowlands or the Darien Community Association House, enjoys a long, distinguished history. The original house was owned by Mary and Frank Green, a wholesale grocer from New York City. Green built his expansive home in the Victorian style in 1876 and resided there until 1915. The home was then bought in 1918 by Charles D. Lockwood, one of the founders of the law firm Cummings and Lockwood. Covering 52 plus acres, the property extended from Middlesex Road and Leroy Avenue to West Avenue. The property operated as a farm with cattle, chickens and fruit trees. The house at that time had on the first floor a parlor, library, hall, dining room, butler's pantry, china closet, and kitchen; second floor included four bedrooms, all with adjoining baths; and the third floor held one large bedroom and three servants' rooms.

After being sold and resold several times, in 1930 the house was bought by Alice and James H. Stark of New York City. The Starks soon initiated a large-scale renovation project for the home that remodeled it to the Georgian Colonial Revival style (also referred to as the Regency style), abandoning the home's original Victorian style features. Donald G. Tarpley was the lead architect. The new home consisted of 22 rooms, including eight bedrooms on the second floor and several servant rooms on the thrift floor. The remodeling also saw the establishment of the home's notable landscaped gardens.

The gardens were designed by one of the premier landscape architects of the early twentieth century, Ellen Biddle Shipman. Shipman designed many gardens for prominent industrialists of the early twentieth century. Her garden designs revealed the importance she placed on privacy, with the garden serving as a secluded retreat from daily life. Shipman's gardens are also noted for their borders, which Shipman frequently used along with old-fashioned plant varieties to create the feeling of a "grandmother’s garden". Called the "dean of American women landscape architects" by House & Garden magazine, Shipman designed more than 650 gardens across the United States during the first half of the twentieth century.

The property changed ownership several times before eventually being sold to The Darien Community Association, Inc. (DCA) by Meylert M. Armstrong in 1950, concluding the DCA's long search for a permanent home. The original 52-acre (21 ha) property was split up, with the DCA purchasing seven plus acres. Over the years, renovations have been made to the structure to make it more of a gathering place for the community. The need for an even larger assembly space resulted in construction of the Garden Wing, which was completed and dedicated in 1966 to help create a setting for many weddings, parties, lectures and general programs.

A major renovation was done in 2000 to add a state-of-the-art kitchen and other structural enhancements, which further added to the DCA's appeal. The home became a popular setting for weddings and other celebrations. In 2011, the DCA began a restoration project on the first floor, which had begun to show its wear, with careful attention placed on adhering to the style of the house. The DCA was assisted in this by Michelle Canning, both a highly respected interior designer as well as an active member of the DCA. Existing furniture was painstakingly refinished with top quality fabric, donated by Michelle. The rooms have been updated with new paint and paper, evocative of the Georgian design. In 2013–2014, two large capital projects were completed: the installation of parking lot lighting, and renovation of the Garden Wing bathrooms as well as the powder rooms across from the library.

Currently, the DCA Meadowlands is a 15,000 square foot, Regency-style estate situated on eight acres of property. The facilities include a spacious Garden Wing with attached commercial kitchen, boardroom and intimate library, and rooms which look out to its formal garden. The property also includes a working Lord & Burnham greenhouse (original to the estate), and a four-acre bird sanctuary.

It was listed on the National Register of Historic Places in 1987.

== See also ==
- National Register of Historic Places listings in Fairfield County, Connecticut
