= Arthur and Lyn Chivvis House =

- U.S. National Register of Historic Places
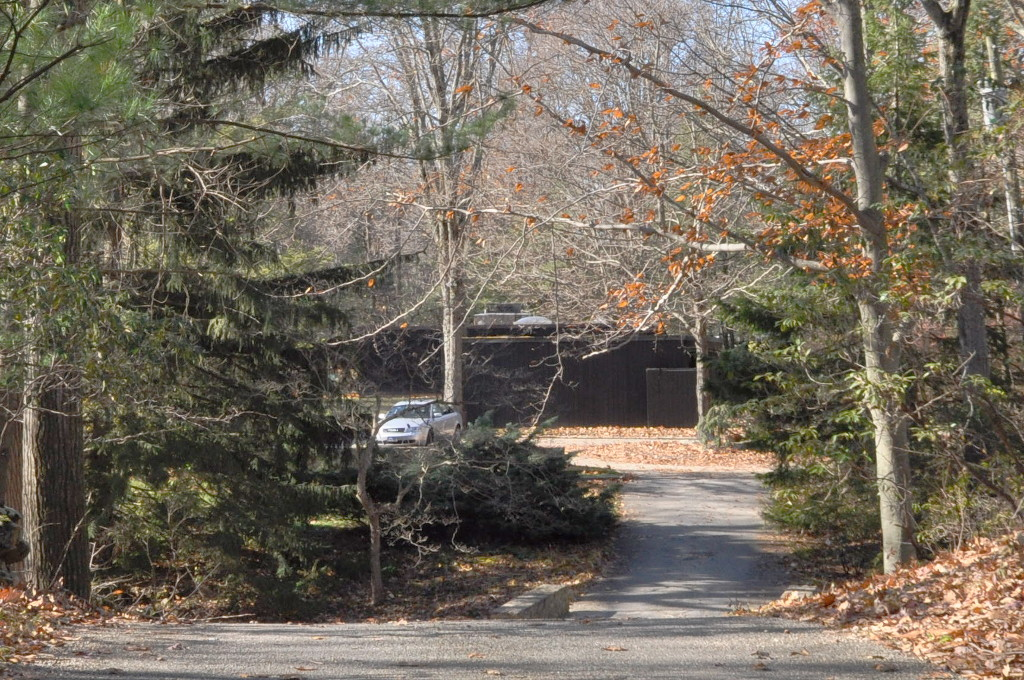
- View of the Goldberg-designed garage

- Location within Connecticut Location within the United States
- Location: 2 Wydendown Road, New Canaan, Connecticut
- Coordinates: 41°10′56″N 73°30′27″W
- Area: 4 acres (1.6 ha)
- Built: 1978
- Architect: Noyes, Eliot; Goldberg, Alan
- Architectural style: Modern Movement
- MPS: Mid-Twentieth-Century Modern REsidences in Connecticut 1930-1979, MPS
- NRHP reference No.: 10000564
- Added to NRHP: September 24, 2010

The Arthur and Lyn Chivvis House is a historic house at 2 Wydendown Road in New Canaan, Connecticut. Built in 1977-78, it was designed by architect Eliot Noyes for a family friend, and was his last residential commission. Its Modern Movement design is based in part of the architect's own residence in New Canaan. The house was listed on the National Register of Historic Places in 2010.

== Description and history ==
The Chivvis House stands in a rural residential setting, at the end of a cul-de-sac off Smith Ridge Road north of New Canaan's village center. It is a single-story H-shaped structure, with large wings joined by a central hyphen. The wings are oriented in a north-south direction, and are finished in a combination of floor-to-ceiling glass, and tongue-and-groove vertical siding. The eastern facade gives views over a stream which traverses the property. The area north of the hyphen forms the formal entry to the building, while a private bluestone patio fills the southern area. The house is covered by a flat rubber membrane roof, and rests on piers over a crawlspace, except for the hyphen, which is built on a concrete slab. The interior is divided by function: the west wing houses the private spaces of the house, while the east wing houses the kitchen, dining area, and living spaces. The interior includes all original finishes and features.

The house was built in 1977-78 for Arthur and Lyn Chivvis. Lyn (née Bremer) Chivvis was a family friend of the architect, Eliot Noyes, and had grown up in another New Canaan house Noyes had designed. Noyes completed the design, but died during the construction of the house. Completion of the house, and the construction of planned southern extensions to the wings, was overseen by Noyes' business partner, Alan Goldberg. At the time of the house's listing on the National Register in 2010, it was still owned by the Chivvis family.

== See also ==
- National Register of Historic Places listings in Fairfield County, Connecticut
