= Nathaniel Curtis House =

Historic house in Connecticut, United States

- U.S. National Register of Historic Places
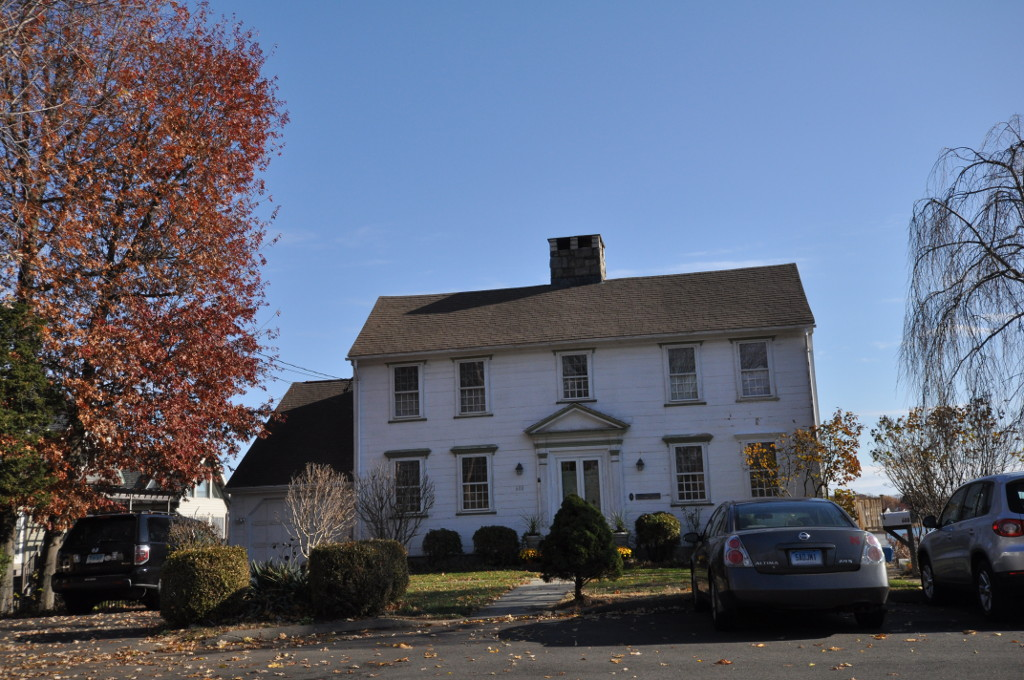

- Location within Connecticut Location within the United States
- Location: 600 Housatonic Avenue, Stratford, Connecticut
- Coordinates: 41°11′48″N 73°7′12″W
- Area: less than one acre
- Built: 1735
- Architect: Curtis, Nathaniel
- Architectural style: Georgian
- NRHP reference No.: 82004342
- Added to NRHP: April 15, 1982

The Nathaniel Curtis House is a Georgian style house at 600 Housatonic Avenue in Stratford, Connecticut. Built about 1735, it is one of the town's few surviving 18th-century buildings. It was moved, by water, on a barge, in 1973, to its present location on the bank of the Housatonic River to rescue it from demolition. The house was listed on the National Register of Historic Places in 1982.

== Description and history ==
The Nathaniel Curtis House is located in central eastern Stratford, on the east side of Housatonic Avenue at its northern (cul-de-sac) end. It is a 2 1/2-story wood-frame structure, five bays wide, with a central entrance, central chimney, and side-gable roof. A leanto section extending from the rear gives the house a classic colonial saltbox appearance. The main entrance is a framed by a Federal style surround, with pilasters supporting an entablature and full gabled pediment. The interior has a typical central chimney plan, with a narrow entry vestibule in front of the chimney, which also houses a narrow winding staircase. To either side of the chimney are parlors, and a long kitchen extends behind these rooms. Many interior finishes and features are original to the 18th century.

The house was built about 1735, and originally stood on Elm Street (previously known as Front Street) about 1 mile (1.6 km) to the south of its present location. It was probably built by Nathaniel Curtis, and remained in that family until 1859. In 1973 it was threatened with demolition, to make way for construction of a condominium complex. A Curtis descendant purchased the house, and had it transported by barge to its present location. It maintains its original orientation, facing away from the river. Although the foundation was not preserved, the chimney was in large part disassembled and reconstructed on the new site.

== See also ==
- National Register of Historic Places listings in Fairfield County, Connecticut
