= Branchville Railroad Tenement =

- U.S. National Register of Historic Places
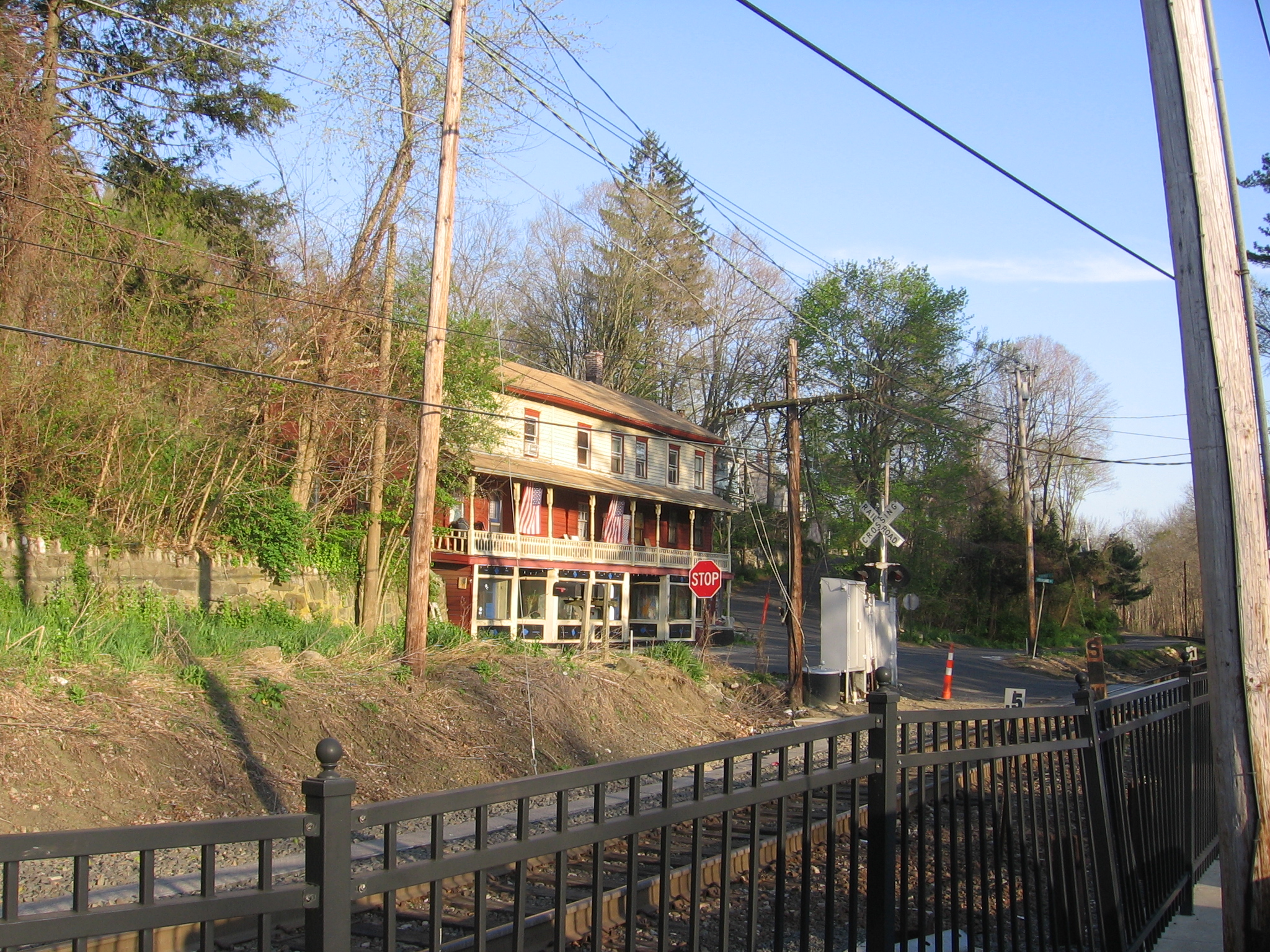
- Tenement seen from Branchville station, April 19, 2012

- Location within Connecticut Location within the United States
- Location: Portland Avenue and West Branchville Road, Ridgefield, Connecticut
- Coordinates: 41°15′56″N 73°26′23″W
- Area: 1.3 acres (0.53 ha)
- Built: 1853
- Architectural style: Victorian Vernacular
- NRHP reference No.: 82004346
- Added to NRHP: August 12, 1982

The Branchville Railroad Tenement is a historic commercial and residential building at the Junction of Portland Avenue and West Branchville Road in Ridgefield, Connecticut. Built in stages between about 1853 and 1905, it is a distinctive reminder of the area's railroad-related history, serving as tenement housing for railroad workers before being converted to other residential and commercial uses. The building was listed on the National Register of Historic Places on August 12, 1982. It continues to be used for commercial and residential purposes.

== Description and history ==
The Branchville Railroad Tenement is located in Southern Ridgefield, a short way southeast of the Branchville station on the Danbury Line. It occupies a prominent position overlooking the Junction of Portland Avenue and West Branchville Road. It is a vernacular three-story wood frame structure, with a clapboarded exterior and gabled roof. Its most prominent feature is its two-story shed-roof porch, extending the full width of the main facade.

The tenement was built in stages between about 1853 and 1905. Its earliest incarnation was as a storage facility for the railroad station, to which two stories of residences were added to houses workers on the railroad. Following completion of the railroad, the building was converted into a hotel in 1880, at which time the two-story porch was built and the interior was redecorated. This was apparently an unsuccessful venture, and in 1905 it was converted to a saloon and multifamily residence, with an addition expanding its size to the south.

== See also ==
- National Register of Historic Places listings in Fairfield County, Connecticut
