= John Black Lee House I =

- U.S. National Register of Historic Places
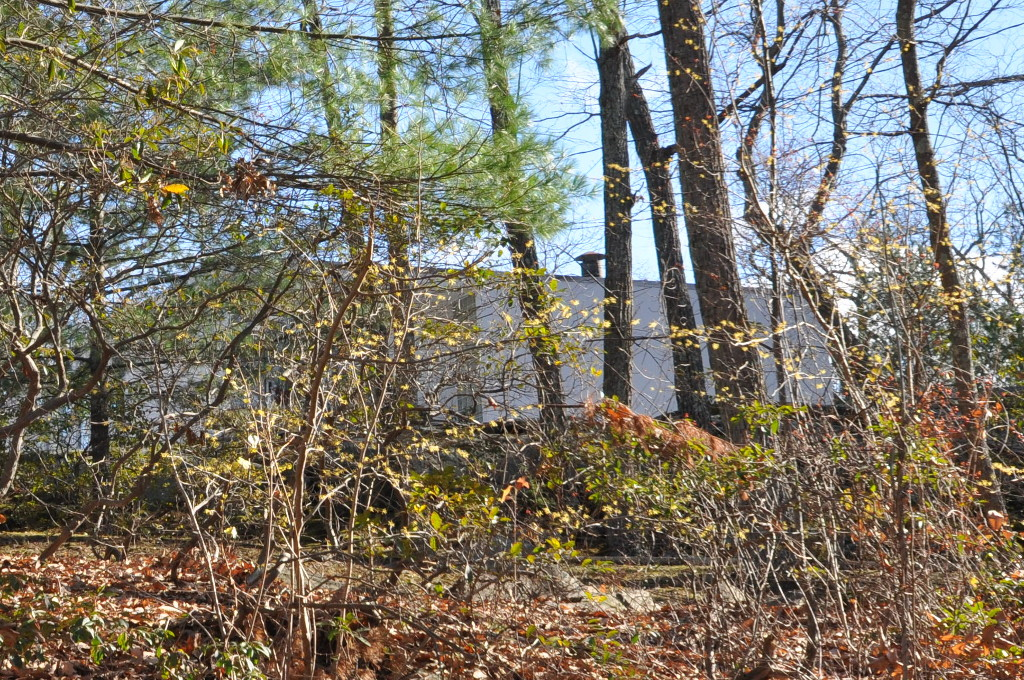

- Location within Connecticut Location within the United States
- Location: 729 Laurel Road, New Canaan, Connecticut
- Coordinates: 41°11′25″N 73°30′01″W
- Area: 3 acres (1.2 ha)
- Built: 1952
- Built by: Rau, Earnest
- Architect: Lee, John Black
- Architectural style: Modern Movement
- MPS: Mid-Twentieth-Century Modern Residences in Connecticut 1930-1979, MPS
- NRHP reference No.: 10000568
- Added to NRHP: September 16, 2010

The John Black Lee House I is a historic house at 729 Laurel Road in New Canaan, Connecticut. It was designed by architect John Black Lee and built in 1952, and was the first of several houses he designed for his family's use. The house is an excellent expression of minimalist Bauhaus style Modern architecture, and was listed on the National Register of Historic Places in 2010.

== Description and history ==
The John Black Lee House I is located in a rural-residential area in northern New Canaan, on a 3-acre (1.2 ha) on the east side of Laurel Road just south of its junction with North Wilton Road. The house is set on a high ridge which runs parallel to the roadway. It is a single-story structure, with a unique post-and-beam construction that incorporates metal rods to anchor the structure to the underlying granite. The exterior is finished in glass and wood, and is covered by a flat roof. The west-facing front is largely windowless, with only a recessed entry area. The more private south side is mainly an expanse of floor-to-ceiling glass.

John Black Lee moved to New Canaan in 1951, joining the architectural practice of Eliot Noyes, one of the Harvard Five who had been building Modernist houses in New Canaan. Lee's first house was built for his family the following year by Ernest Rau, a local building contractor who went on to build many more of Lee's designs in the town. He sold this house in 1954, building a second home for the family on Chichester Road. Subsequent owners of the property include Donald Swisher of Skidmore, Owings & Merrill, who carefully preserved Lee's architectural legacy.
