= Shambaugh House =

Historic house in Connecticut, United States

- U.S. National Register of Historic Places
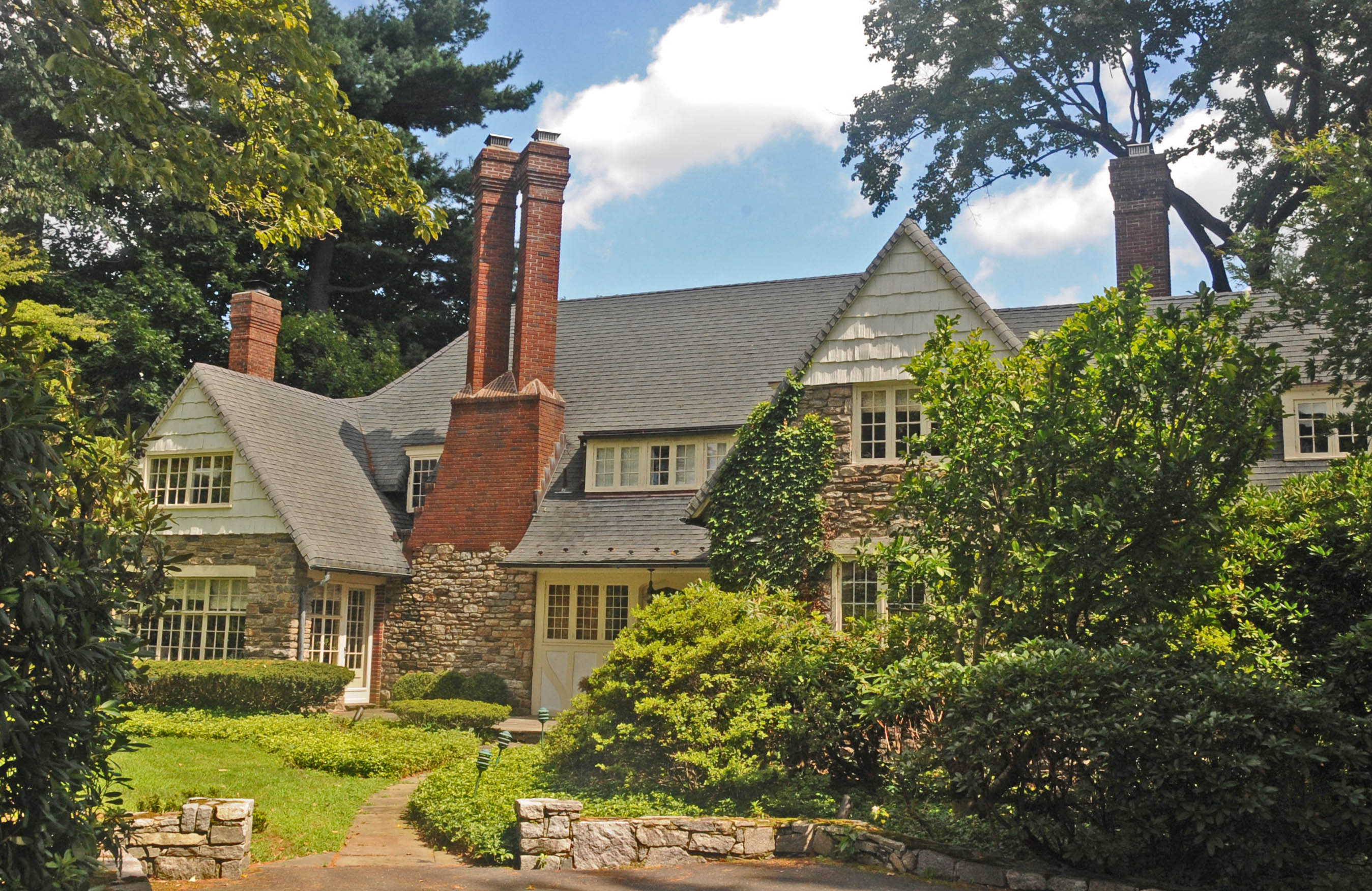
- In 2016

- Location within Connecticut Location within the United States
- Location: 12 Old Hill Road, Westport, Connecticut
- Coordinates: 41°8′38″N 73°22′12″W
- Area: 1.3 acres (0.53 ha)
- Built: 1923
- Architect: Cutler, Charles E.
- NRHP reference No.: 99000432
- Added to NRHP: April 9, 1999

The Shambaugh House is a historic house at 12 Old Hill Road in Westport, Connecticut. It is a two-story structure, built out of random coursed fieldstone, with gable-roofed pavilions projecting from its hipped roof. An attached garage, now converted to residential use, is built of similar materials. The house features numerous dormers and projections, general gable roofed with wooden shingles. Windows are typically multipane casement windows, and rafter ends are exposed under eaves. The house was designed by Westport architect Charles E. Cutler and completed in 1923. It is an excellent local example of Tudor Revival architecture.

The house was listed on the National Register of Historic Places in 1999.

== See also ==
- National Register of Historic Places listings in Fairfield County, Connecticut
