= Greens Ledge Light =

Lighthouse in Connecticut, U.S. (1902)

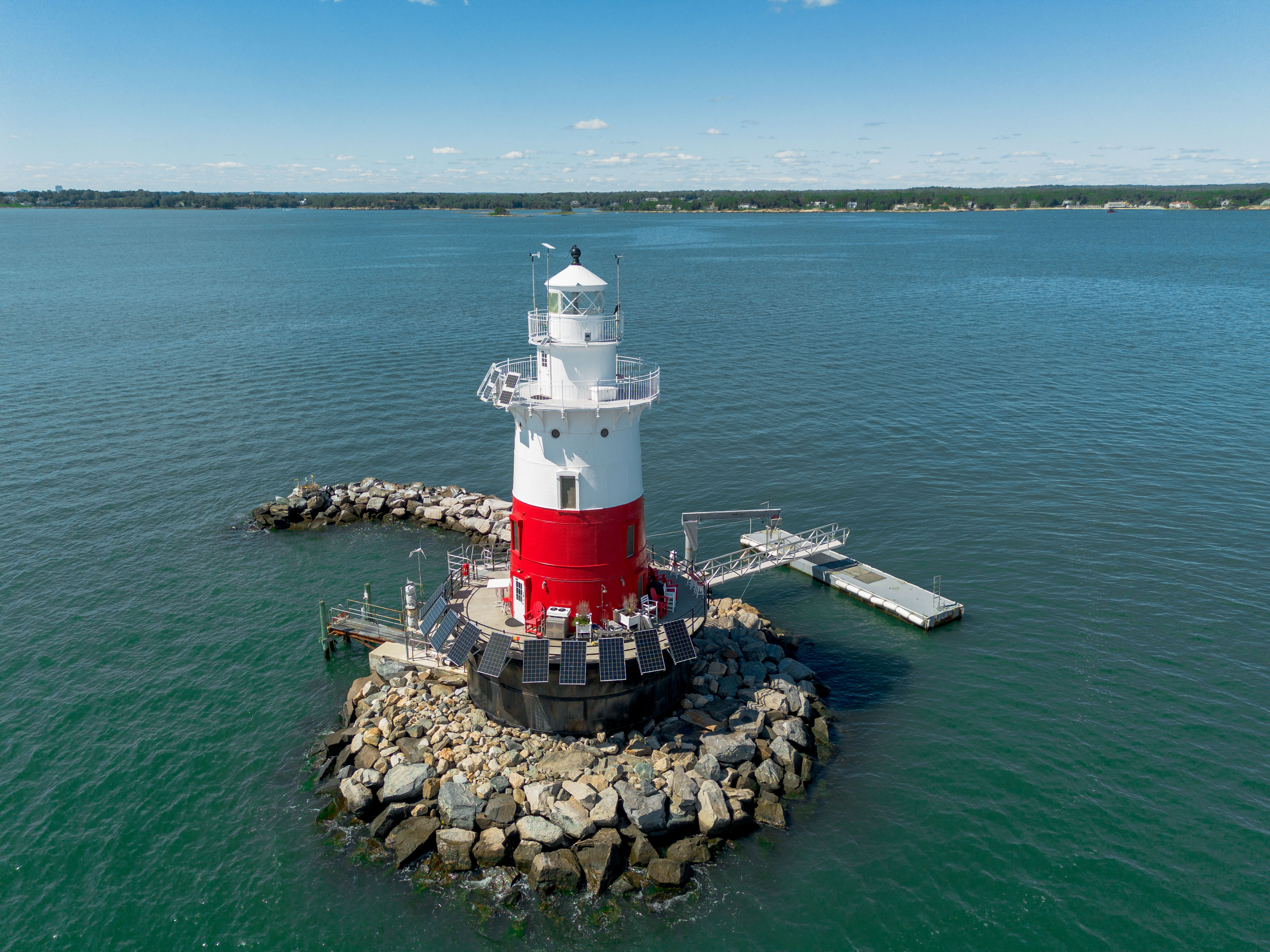
- Greens Ledge Light in 2025
- Location: Fairfield County, Connecticut, United States
- Coordinates: 41°02′31″N 73°26′38″W

Tower
- Constructed: 1902
- Construction: cast iron (tower), concrete (caisson)
- Automated: 1972
- Height: 52 ft (16 m)
- Shape: 2-stages cylindrical tower with double balcony and lantern incorporating keeper's quarter
- Markings: White (top), brown (bottom), black (basement)
- Power source: solar power
- Heritage: National Register of Historic Places listed place
- Fog signal: 2 blasts every 20s.

Light
- Focal height: 62 ft (19 m)
- Lens: 5th order Fresnel lens (original), 4th order Fresnel lens (1902), FA-251 (1987), VRB-25 (current)
- Range: 18 nmi (33 km; 21 mi) (white), 15 nmi (28 km; 17 mi) (red)
- Characteristic: Al WR 12s
- Greens Ledge Lighthouse
- U.S. National Register of Historic Places
- Nearest city: Rowayton, Connecticut
- Area: <1 acre
- Architect: Philadelphia Construction Co.
- MPS: Operating Lighthouses in Connecticut MPS
- NRHP reference No.: 89001468
- Added to NRHP: May 29, 1990

Greens Ledge Lighthouse (also known as Greens Ledge Light, or Rowayton Lighthouse) is a historic offshore lighthouse in the western Long Island Sound near Norwalk, Connecticut and Darien, Connecticut. It is one of 33 sparkplug lighthouses still in existence in the United States and remains an active aid to navigation. It sits in ten feet of water on the west end of Greens Ledge, a shallow underwater reef that runs a mile west of Sheffield Island and is roughly a mile south of the entrance to Five Mile River at Rowayton. Completed in 1902 by the Philadelphia Construction Company, the cast-iron structure is approximately 90 feet tall including roughly 15 feet of the submerged caisson. In 1933, more than 30,000 tons of rocks from the excavation of Radio City Music Hall were added to the riprap foundation. The light was added to the National Register of Historic Places as Greens Ledge Lighthouse on May 29, 1990.

In 2017, Greens Ledge was acquired from the US Government by the Greens Ledge Light Preservation Society, a 501(c)3 nonprofit organization established by a group of local residents with the mission of restoring and preserving the lighthouse. The acquisition was made through a founding donation by The Pettee Family and restoration began in June 2018 to address the critical structural deficiencies of the lighthouse.

== Design ==
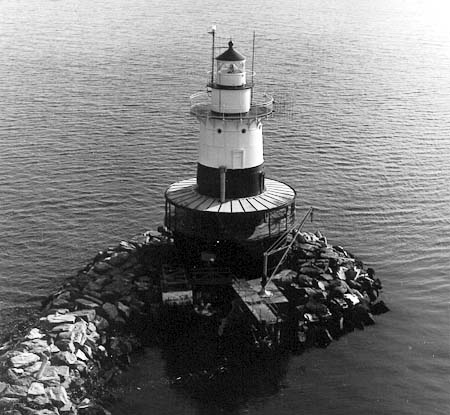
U.S. Coast Guard photo

In the 1890s, the lighthouse was first formally proposed to mark the Norwalk Harbor. In 1899, the United States Congress appropriated $60,000 for the establishment of a light and fog signal at Greens Ledge. In 1900, the Philadelphia Construction Company was contracted to construct the foundation and the superstructure. The design for this type of lighthouse was first realized in 1873, from Major Eliiot of the Lighthouse Board. The foundation form is made of identical curved-iron plates with top inward-pointing flanges that are bolted together and secured with knees. The assembled rings are lowered into the water and filled with concrete or stone, concrete for the Greens Ledge Light. A series of photographs from the work in 1901 shows the assembly of the three lower courses at Wilson's Point, the lowering of the cylinder and the light in the fall of 1901 prior to a deposit of protective riprap.

The 52-foot (16 m) tall Greens Ledge Light was completed in 1902 and serves as a typical example of a sparkplug lighthouse. Located in 10 feet (3.0 m) of water, the foundation flares out to support the deck the lighthouse is built on and includes a cavity for the lighthouse's brick basement and cisterns. The four-story structure of the lighthouse is assembled from five courses of curved iron plates. The interior is lined with brick to insulate and strengthen the tower and to "provid[e] an anchorage for the winding cast-iron stairs which rise on the periphery of each story," writes historian Dorothy Templeton.

The plain prefabricated features underwent a period of development of which the Greens Ledge Light was part of a second phase. Templeton describes, "the brackets which support the watchroom gallery and covered deck [as having] a simplified classical detailing and [the] rectilinear window sashes are enclosed in shallower, plainer cast-iron surrounds." A deck encircles the light on above the first story, the watchroom and lantern. The original roofing and some cast-iron stanchions of the decks are able to be seen atop the riprap. The cast-iron door to the lighthouse faces south and at the time of nomination the windows were sealed with plywood. The first floor of the lighthouse serves as the kitchen. The second level has two rooms split by a partition with the smaller room being a bathroom. The third level was not divided, but did not have a description in the National Historic Register of Places survey. The fourth floor has six porthole windows and has had much of its woodwork removed and part of the cast-iron floor and brick wall are exposed. The lighthouse's lantern measures 7 feet (2.1 m) in diameter. Once active, the Sheffield Island Light was discontinued.

== Service ==
Originally, the light had a fifth-order Fresnel lens, but a fourth-order Fresnel lens was installed in May 1902, just three months into its operation. The light characteristic was a fixed white light with a red flash every 15 seconds. In 1972, the light was automated and the Fresnel lens was replaced with a modern optic. The light continues to serve as an active aid to navigation. In 1987, a FA-251 was installed before the current lens, a VRB-25 was installed. The current light characteristic is an alternating white and red flash every 24 seconds. The white and red flashes can be seen for 18 nautical miles and 15 nautical miles, respectably.

During its service, the tower began to tilt and the keepers moved all the furniture to one side of the tower. The problem was reported to have been exacerbated following the 1938 New England hurricane.

== Importance ==
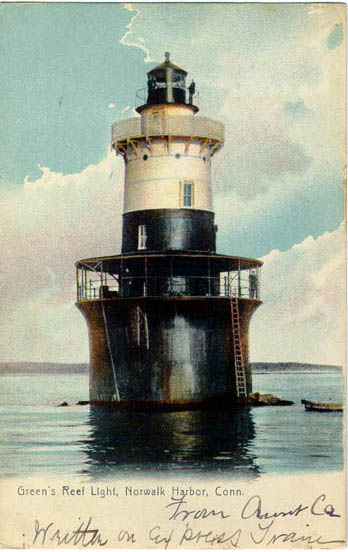
The light in a 1907 postcard.

The light was added to the National Register of Historic Places as Greens Ledge Lighthouse on May 29, 1990. It is listed as "significant as a typical example of a pre-fabricated cast-iron conical lighttower on a cast-iron tubular foundation."

The lighthouse served as a source of inspiration for Walter DuBois Richards, an artist, for over forty years. Since 1935, swimmers have been competing annually in the Arthur J. Ladrigan Swim Race, a one-mile (1.6 km) race from the lighthouse to Bayley Beach in the Rowayton section of Norwalk.

== List of keepers ==
This list includes known keepers, but excludes assistants and non-officers of the Coast Guard.

Name	Year	Reference
William DeLuce	1902–1908	
Robert Burke	1908–1909	
John Huskey	circa 1909	
John Kiarskon	circa 1910	
William T. Locke	1910–1912	
William Rhodes	circa 1917	
George Petzolt	1930–1932	
George Clark	1939–1943	
Greens Ledge Light Preservation Society	2017-present	

== Sold ==
In September 2016, Green's Ledge Light was put up for auction to the public. It was sold on September 15, 2016 for $150,000 to The Pettee Family, the highest of 4 bidders. The Pettee Family donated the lighthouse to a newly founded 501(c)3 nonprofit, The Greens Ledge Light Preservation Society, to spearhead the restoration and preservation efforts.

Sale-Lot Number:
BOSTN116008001
Sale Type:
Online Auction
City, State:
Norwalk, CT
Bidders:
4
Close Time:
09/15 03:03 PM CT (Closed)
Time Remaining:
Case #:
1-X-CT-0551

== See also ==
- List of lighthouses in Connecticut
- List of lighthouses in the United States
- National Register of Historic Places listings in Fairfield County, Connecticut
