= Manresa Island =

Former island in Norwalk, Connecticut

- Location along the coast of Connecticut Manresa Island (the United States)
- Etymology: Named for the Manresa Institute, which itself was named after Manresa, Spain

Geography
- Location: Long Island Sound
- Coordinates: 41°4′29″N 73°24′36″W
- Area: 144 acres (58 ha)
- Highest elevation: 7 ft (2.1 m)

Administration
- United States
- State: Connecticut
- County: Fairfield County
- City: Norwalk

Manresa Island is an island located in Norwalk, Connecticut, at the mouth of Norwalk Harbor in the Long Island Sound. The earliest name for the landform was Boutons Island, which dates to 1664. By the 19th century, the island had been purchased by John H. Keyser, who lived there and cultivated rare vegetation. He built a causeway in 1860, connecting the island to the mainland of South Norwalk. This gave rise to the name Keyser Island, which was sold to the Jesuits toward the end of the century.

On the island, the Jesuits established the Manresa Institute, which was the only dedicated retreat center in the United States. It hosted both prominent Catholic prelates as well as laymen, as part of a growing lay retreat movement in the United States. The institute was named for the Spanish city of Manresa, in which Saint Ignatius of Loyola, the founder of the Society of Jesus, wrote his Spiritual Exercises. In 1911, the Jesuits sold Keyser Island, which became known as Manresa Island in the mid-twentieth century.

In the 1950s, Connecticut Light & Power constructed a coal-fired power plant on the land. Over the years, the company filled in much of the tidal flats surrounding the island with coal ash, greatly increasing the size of the island from its original 23 acres (9.3 hectares) to 144 acres (58 hectares), and leading to significant ground pollution. In 1972, the plant was converted to burn fuel oil, and an oil spill occurred, damaging the surrounding environment. The plant was sold to NRG Energy in 1999, and was severely damaged by Hurricane Sandy in 2012, leading to its permanent closure in 2013. A portion of the land today is an undeveloped and ecologically important marine habitat.

In 2024, a non-profit acquired the property with the intention of remediating it into a publicly-accessible area called Manresa Island Park.

== History ==
The earliest records of the island date to 1664, when it was known as Boutons Island. Located in the Long Island Sound, at the mouth of Norwalk Harbor, the island is part of the city of Norwalk, Connecticut. It is situated across the harbor from the historic Calf Pasture Beach.

The island was owned by John H. Keyser, who lived on the island, giving rise to its later name of Keyser Island. In 1860, he spent thousands of dollars to build a causeway across the marsh to connect it to the mainland, allowing carriages to cross from South Norwalk. He developed the island as a park, filling it with rare trees and vegetation, and building a greenhouse. Keyser eventually sold the island to the Society of Jesus, in 1888 or 1889.

=== Manresa Institute ===
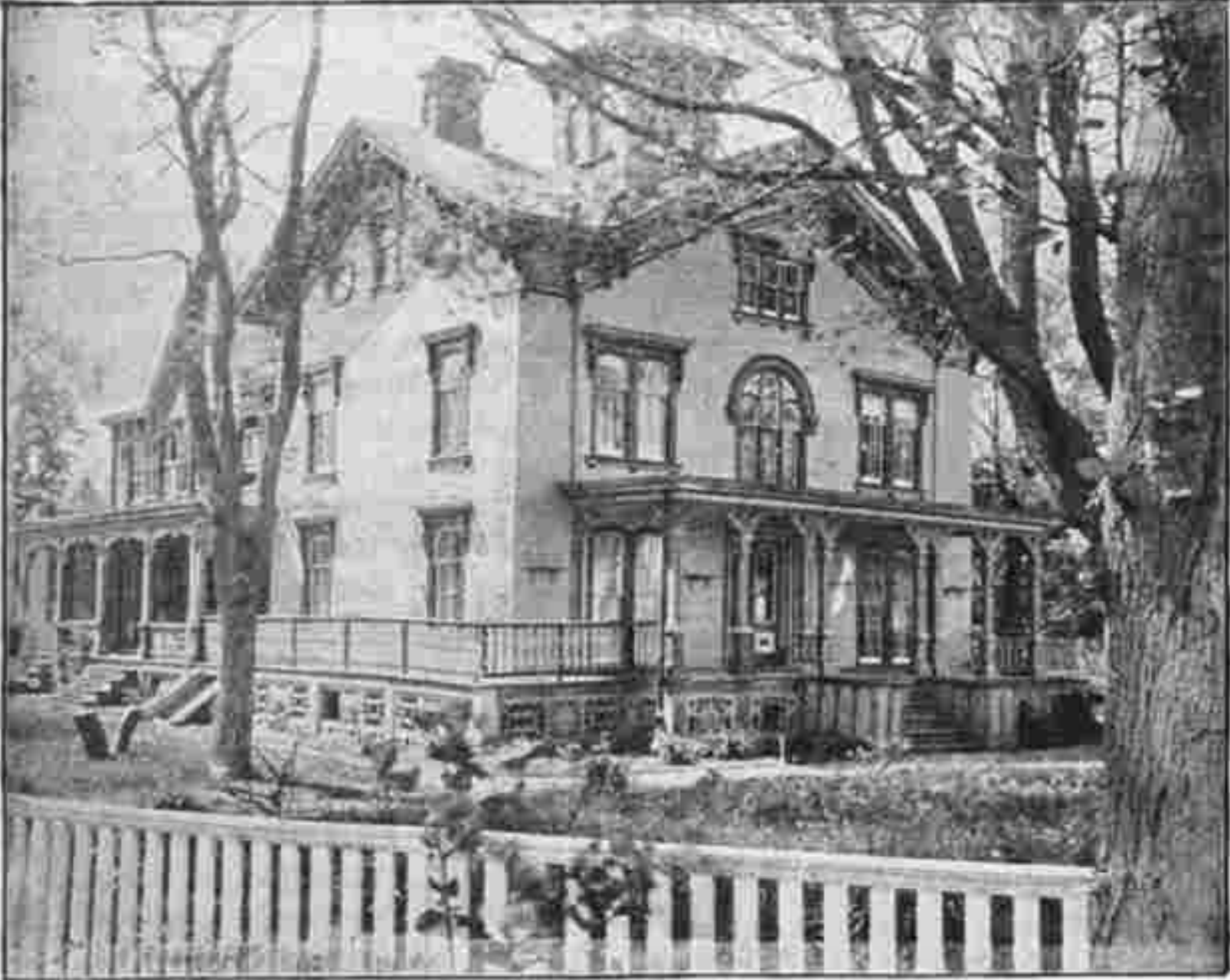
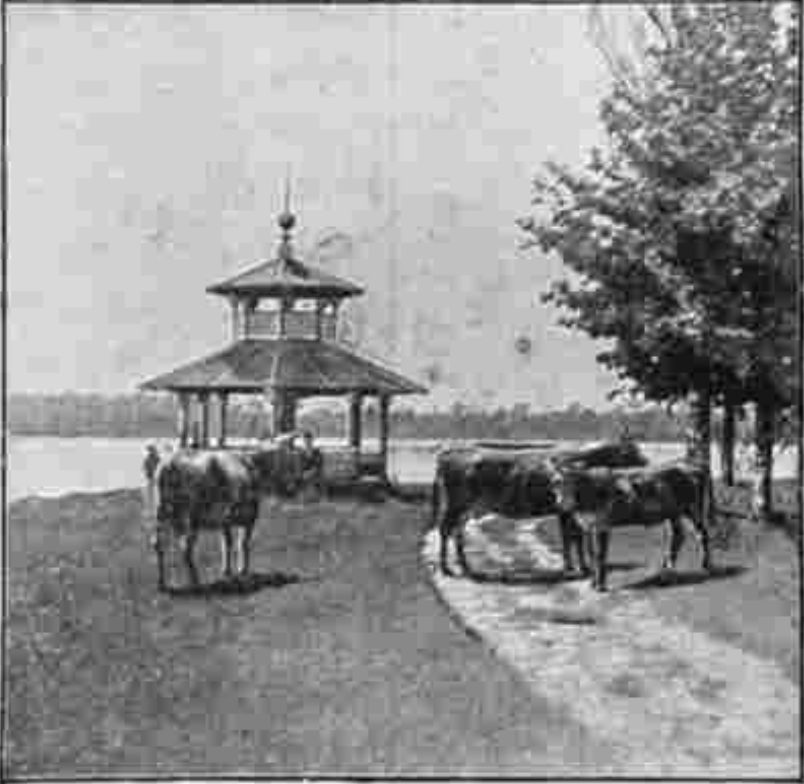
Manresa House (left) and pavilion (right) of the Manresa Institute on Keyser Island, c. 1896

With growing interest in religious retreats for laymen around the turn of the 19th century, the provincial superior of the Maryland-New York Province of the Society of Jesus, Joseph Hanselman, charged Fr. Terence Shealy with establishing a center to host retreats. The retreats would be designed for a wide range of workers, from bricklayers to bankers, and regardless of ability to pay. Shealy began hosting retreats at Fordham University, where he was an instructor at the School of Law, during the summers. Since retreats could only occur at Fordham when classes were not in session, a more secluded and permanent location was sought. Keyser Island was selected as a place that offered greater quietude for reflection. Eventually, retreats were permanently moved from Fordham to Keyser Island.

The Jesuits formally inaugurated the Manresa Institute on Keyser Island on April 21, 1889 (Easter Sunday), as the only facility in the United States dedicated solely to hosting retreats. The institute was named after the Spanish city of Manresa, where Saint Ignatius of Loyola, the 16th-century founder of the Society of Jesus, wrote the Spiritual Exercises. At the time the retreat center was founded, the urban area of South Norwalk was two miles away, and the area was very secluded. Besides the Jesuits who administered retreats, the 23-acre (9.3-hectare) island was uninhabited. The Jesuits constructed one primary building, called Manresa House, from which the retreats were run, as well as two smaller cottages.

The center became a prominent retreat institution, where the newly appointed Bishops of Brooklyn, Albany, Ogdensburg, and Hartford went in preparation for their ordination as bishops. In 1911, Shealy decided to move the Manresa Institute to Staten Island in New York City, where he purchased the Fox Hill Villa near Fort Wadsworth. The retreat center continued to operate on Staten Island as Mount Manresa, until 1927. Keyser Island continued to be known by that name, until around the Second World War, when its name officially became Manresa Island.

== Manresa power plant ==
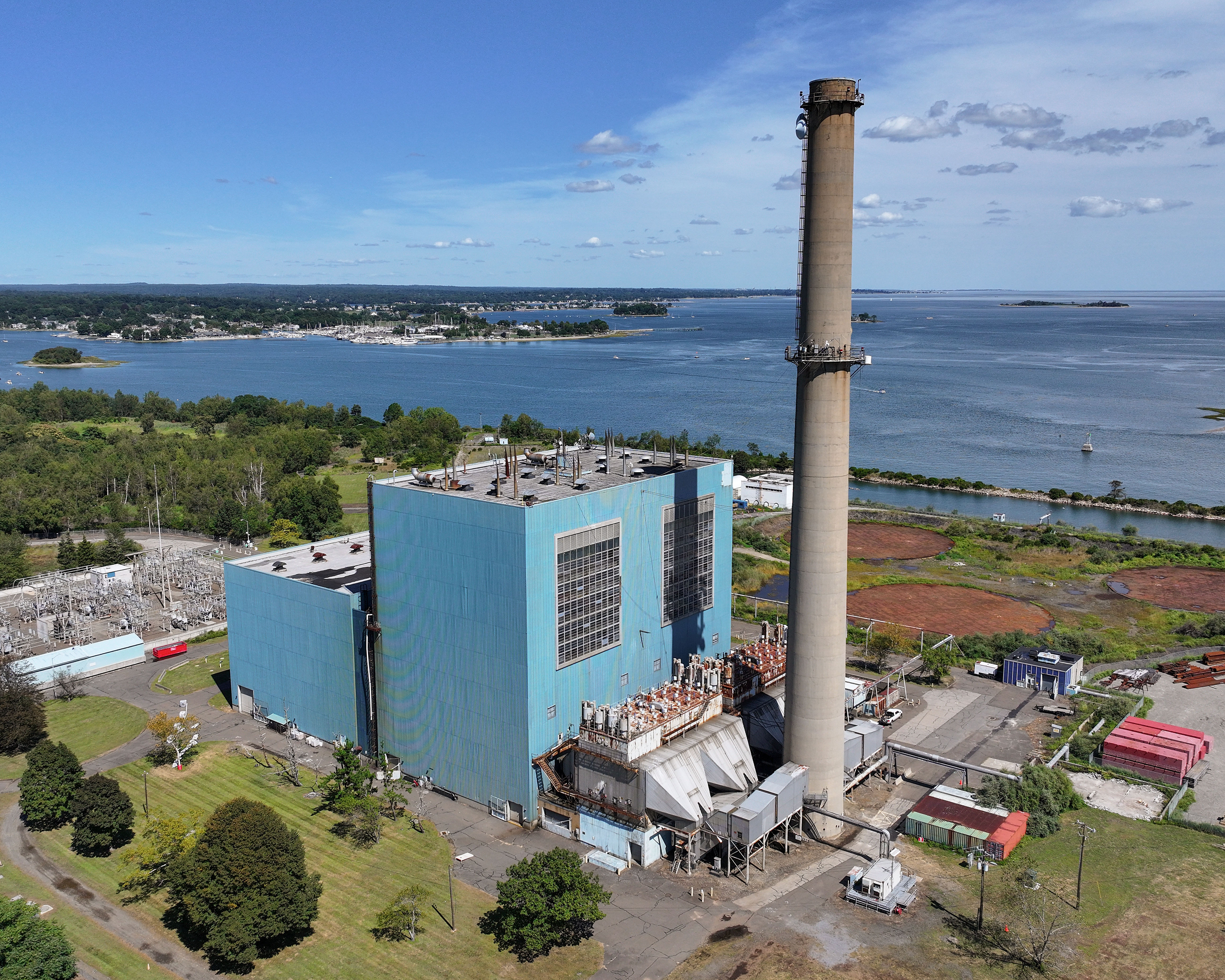
Norwalk Harbor Generating Station, 2025

The Jesuits eventually sold the land, and in 1953, the Norwalk Zoning Commission approved the construction of a coal-fired power plant by Connecticut Light & Power on the island. Despite opposition by local residents, the Norwalk Harbor Generating Station was built and put into service in 1960. A major spill of fuel oil occurred in 1969, causing significant ecological damage to the beach at Village Creek and the surrounding tidal flats. That same year, the plant built a transmission line beneath the Long Island Sound, connecting it to Long Island. By 1972, the plant had been converted to use oil instead of coal. In response to the Resource Conservation and Recovery Act, the first official recognition of the ecological damage done to the surrounding area by the plant was made in 1980. By the late 1990s, the island and plant had been recognized as heavily polluted.

In 1999, the power plant was purchased by NRG Energy, which continued to operate the facility. When Hurricane Sandy struck in 2012, almost the entire island was flooded. As a result of the damage, the plant was shut down in June 2013.

=== Physical growth of the island ===
While the original Keyser Island was only 23 acres (9.3 hectares), the island underwent significant expansion over the years, with the most dramatic growth occurring in the decades following the construction of the power plant. The first fill deposited was likely earth excavated during construction of the power plant and from dredging nearby. The significant land fill resulted in the differentiation of two parcels. The northern parcel is undeveloped land, and was created when Connecticut Light & Power received permission to deposit large quantities of coal ash there, which was a byproduct of the power plant's operation. The southern parcel, which contains the original, much smaller island, houses the decommissioned power plant and support infrastructure, as well as an electrical substation. Given the periodical fill of the surrounding marshes, the southern parcel is today 46.9 acres (19.0 hectares) and the northern parcel is 97 acres (39 hectares), giving the entire plot of land an area of approximately 144 acres (58 hectares).

== Redevelopment plans ==
With the closing of the power plant in 2013, discussions between the state, local communities, and the plant owner began on whether and how to decommission the facility and how to utilize Manresa Island generally, including how to remediate the significant ground pollutants at the site. In 2017, the Manresa Association and the City of Norwalk began a study to identify potential future uses of the land as well as the economic impact of those uses. The study was completed in 2019 and recommended four potential options for redevelopment of the southern parcel of the land: a marina, a solar farm, an educational facility, or a residential development. Each of these options would incur cleanup costs of $8 million to $30 million or more.

The Connecticut Department of Transportation announced in 2020 that it was considering using Manresa Island as a construction staging area for the project to replace the Norwalk River Railroad Bridge.

In October 2023, NRG Energy sold Manresa Island to Argent Ventures, a real estate company, for redevelopment.

== Manresa Wilds ==
In 2024, Argent sold the island to a non-profit organization, Manresa Island Corporation, funded primarily by Austin McChord and his wife Allison. The McChords announced their intention to remediate the site and create Manresa Island Park. In June 2025, the three 7.5 million gallon steel oil tanks that sat on the site were demolished. The park’s official name, Manresa Wilds, was unveiled alongside an initial vision for the park at a Community Day Festival at the Point at Norwalk Cove on July 13, 2025.

== Biodiversity ==
The undeveloped portion of Manresa Island, which consists of a coastal forest as well as intertidal estuaries, is one of the last remaining undisturbed marine habitats on the Fairfield County coast. It also contains a number of ecologically important wetlands. These habitats serve as breeding grounds for migratory birds, and are home to around 200 bird species. The waters around Manresa Island are designated as essential habitats for a number of fish species.

== See also ==
- Norwalk Islands
- Coastal Connecticut
- List of Jesuit sites
