= Peck Ledge Light =

Lighthouse in Connecticut, United States

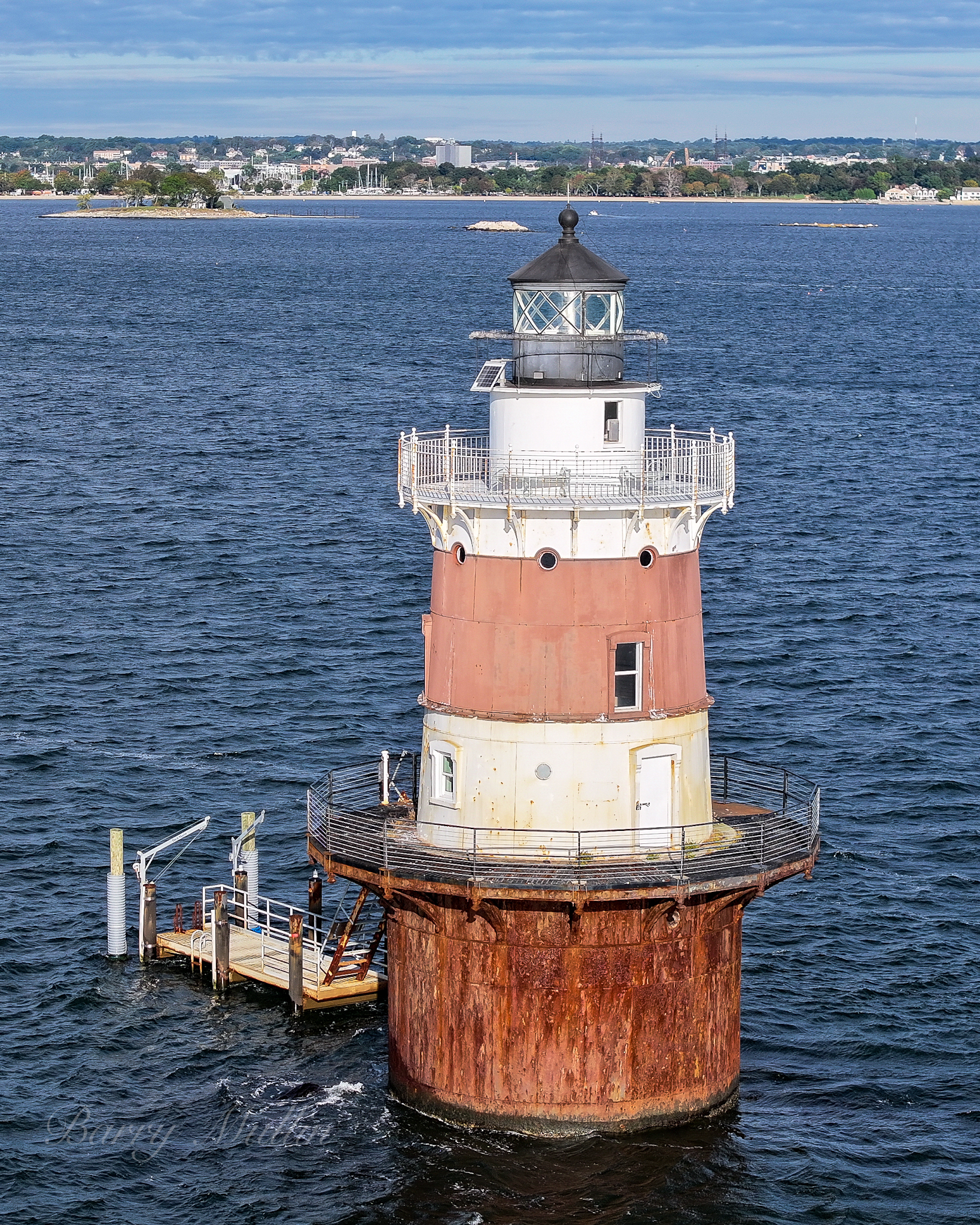
- Peck Ledge Light in 2023
- Location: Long Island Sound, Connecticut
- Coordinates: 41°04′38.4″N 73°22′11.38″W

Tower
- Constructed: 1906
- Foundation: cast iron and concrete caisson
- Construction: sparkplug lighthouse
- Automated: 1933
- Height: 54 feet (16 m)
- Shape: 2-stages cylindrical tower with double balcony and lantern incorporating keeper's quarter
- Markings: white tower with red band, black lantern, rusty basement
- Power source: solar power
- Operator: Lighthouse Preservation Group LLC
- Heritage: National Register of Historic Places listed place

Light
- Focal height: 61 feet (19 m)
- Lens: Fourth order Fresnel lens (original), VLB-44 (LED) (current)
- Range: 5 nautical miles (9.3 km; 5.8 mi)
- Characteristic: Fl G 2.5s.
- Peck Ledge Lighthouse
- U.S. National Register of Historic Places
- Nearest city: Norwalk, Connecticut
- Area: less than one acre
- NRHP reference No.: 89001472
- Added to NRHP: May 29, 1990

Peck Ledge Light, also known as "Peck Ledge Lighthouse", is a sparkplug lighthouse in Norwalk, Connecticut, United States, southeast of Norwalk Harbor and northeast of Goose Island among the Norwalk Islands on Long Island Sound. The lighthouse is about two miles (3 km) from Calf Pasture Beach in Norwalk and can be seen from the beach.

The cast-iron structure is still a working lighthouse operated by the United States Coast Guard and is not open to the public. The 54-foot-high (16 m) lighthouse is painted white with a brown band in the middle. Inside, the structure has three stories of living space along with a basement with cisterns for rainwater storage, all below a watchroom and lantern.

== History ==
The lighthouse was built in 1906 and had a fourth order Fresnel lens. The light was automated by the Coast Guard in 1933 and now flashes green every 2.5 seconds. In 1988 the Fresnel lens was removed and a 250 mm optic was installed. In 1990 the lighthouse was added to the National Register of Historic Places. In 2004 the Coast Guard installed 100 tons of granite riprap as well as a section of step-cut stones to allow for easier access.

Despite damage from vandalism, nesting birds, and corrosion, the structure is still said to be in good shape.

== Nomenclature ==
Neither the official US Coast Guard name nor the NRHP listing puts an "s" on the name. The NOAA chart of the area shows that it is adjacent to "Peck Ledge".

== Head keepers ==
- George W. Bardwell (1906 – 1907)
- August Lorenz (1907 – 1909)
- Conrad Hawk (1909 – 1914)
- Ferdinand Heizman (1914 – at least 1917)
- William Hardwick (at least 1919)
- Charles J. Kenney (at least 1920 – 1925)
- George Scheer (1925 – )
- George Clarke (at least 1928 – at least 1930)

== See also ==
- List of lighthouses in Connecticut
- List of lighthouses in the United States
- National Register of Historic Places listings in Fairfield County, Connecticut
