= Norwalk rail accident =

1853 railroad accident in Connecticut

Coordinates: 41°6′02″N 73°24′55″W

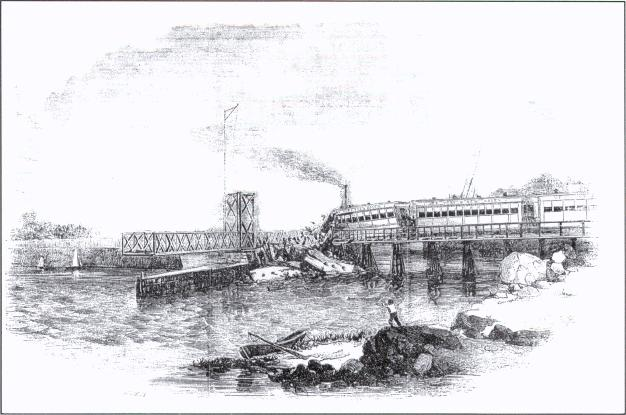
- Originally titled "The Catastrophe", the illustration depicts the accident site

Details
- Date: May 6, 1853
- Location: Norwalk, Connecticut
- Country: United States
- Line: New York and New Haven Railroad
- Incident type: Movable bridge open
- Cause: Signal passed at danger

Statistics
- Trains: 1
- Passengers: 200
- Deaths: 48
- Injured: 30

The Norwalk rail accident occurred on May 6, 1853, in Norwalk, Connecticut, and was the first major U.S. railroad bridge disaster; 48 were killed when a train travelling at 50 miles per hour (80 km/h) plunged into the Norwalk Harbor off an open swing bridge.

The accident occurred on the New York and New Haven Railroad where it crosses a small inlet of Long Island Sound via a swing bridge. The approach from New York is around a sharp curve, so there was a signal indicating if the bridge was passable by trains: a red ball mounted upon a tall pole.

At 08:00 that morning, the Boston express left New York with 200 passengers driven by a substitute driver for whom this was the third transit of the route. The train consisted of two baggage and five passenger cars. On approaching the bridge, the driver neglected to check the signal and only became aware that the bridge was open when within 400 feet (120 m) of it. The bridge had been opened for the passage of the steamship Pacific, which had just passed through. The driver applied the brakes and reversed the engine, but was unable to stop in time. He and the fireman leapt clear before the bridge and escaped serious injury. The engine itself flew across the 60-foot (18 m) gap, striking the opposite abutment some 8 feet (2.4 m) below the level of the track and sinking into 12 feet (3.7 m) of water. The baggage cars came to rest atop the locomotive; the front of the first passenger car was crushed against the baggage cars and then submerged as the second passenger car came to rest on top of it. The third passenger car broke in two; the front half hanging down over the edge of the abutment; the rear remaining on the track. Most of the 48 dead and 30 injured were in the first passenger car. A further eight people were reported missing.

The coroner's jury found the engineer primarily responsible for the disaster, and he was prosecuted for manslaughter, but acquitted.

Many doctors were travelling on the train, returning from the Sixth Annual Meeting of the American Medical Association in New York; seven of them were killed. Amongst the unhurt was Dr. Gurdon Wadsworth Russell, who wrote an account of the accident for the Hartford Courant in which he says that the dead "presented all the symptoms of asphyxia from drowning, and were probably drowned at once, being confined and pressed by broken cars. Oh, what a melancholy scene that!"

Dr. Jonathan Mason Warren was also one of the survivors. He described this day's event in his journal:

I expected instant death, as I saw everything in front of us, up to the very seats on which we were sitting — cars, passengers, and all — plunge headlong into the water and disappear. Having dragged Mrs. Warren and the children up into the rear of the car which so happily for us had remained on the track, I made my escape with them on to the bridge behind, with the loss of nothing but my hat.

After he and his family escaped safely, he proceeded to help the others, though it is not well documented how he did so. In the Memoir of Jonathan Mason Warren, the author Howard Payson Arnold describes: "⋯efforts he made during several hours to minister to the needs of the survivors, and to bring something like organized efficiency to bear upon the frightful and chaotic confusion that came close upon the disaster." ⋯ "he wrought on and on, lending a helping hand wherever he saw any possible need of his skill and experience." The author and Warren himself mention the specific case of "Miss Griswold", one of Rufus Wilmot Griswold's daughters, who was found unconscious but woke up after two hours of artificial respiration by him. Considering that Warren wrote the injuries of other people, he likely identified those in need and provided medical care if possible.

The American Medical Association later published an account in memory of those who were killed.

As a result of the public panic and indignation caused by the accident, a bill was introduced in the Connecticut Legislature establishing a powerful state Board of Railroad Commissioners. However, in the version actually enacted, the board's enforcement powers were removed, as well as a requirement that every train in the state would have to come to a dead halt before crossing any opening bridge. The railroad, however, adopted such a policy on its own.

A similar accident occurred eleven years later in Canada with even greater loss of life, the St-Hilaire train disaster.
