= Daniel J. Shea =

U.S. Army soldier

Daniel John Shea
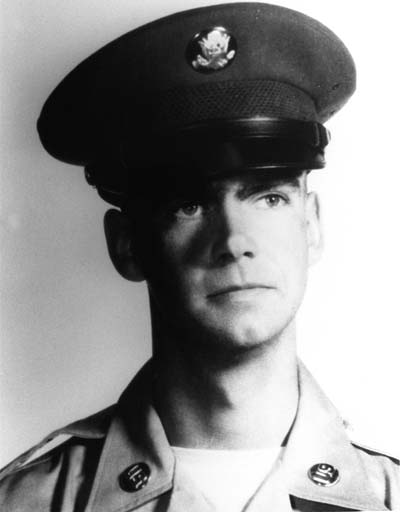
- Private First Class Daniel Shea
- Born: January 29, 1947; East Norwalk, Connecticut, U.S.
- Died: May 14, 1969 (aged 22); Quang Tri Province, South Vietnam
- Burial place: St. John Cemetery, Norwalk, Connecticut
- Military career
- Allegiance: United States
- Branch: United States Army
- Service years: 1967–1969
- Rank: Private First Class
- Units: Headquarters Company and Company C, 3rd Battalion, 21st Infantry Regiment, 196th Infantry Brigade, Americal Division
- Conflicts: Vietnam War †
- Awards: Medal of Honor; Purple Heart

Daniel John Shea (January 29, 1947 – May 14, 1969) was a soldier in the US Army who posthumously received the Medal of Honor for his heroic actions and sacrifice of life during the Vietnam War for actions occurring in the Quang Tri Province on May 14, 1969.

Shea joined the Army from New Haven, Connecticut in 1967.

== Namesake ==
The Shea-Magrath Sports Complex at Norwalk High School in Connecticut is partially named in his honor. Shea Island off the coast of Norwalk is also named for him.

== Medal of Honor citation ==
Private First Class Shea's official Medal of Honor citation reads:

For conspicuous gallantry and intrepidity in action at the risk of his life above and beyond the call of duty. Pfc. Shea, Headquarters and Headquarters Company, 3d Battalion, distinguished himself while serving as a medical aidman with Company C, 3d Battalion, during a combat patrol mission. As the lead platoon of the company was crossing a rice paddy, a large enemy force in ambush positions opened fire with mortars, grenades and automatic weapons. Under heavy crossfire from 3 sides, the platoon withdrew to a small island in the paddy to establish a defensive perimeter. Pfc. Shea, seeing that a number of his comrades had fallen in the initial hail of fire, dashed from the defensive position to assist the wounded. With complete disregard for his safety and braving the intense hostile fire sweeping the open rice paddy, Pfc. Shea made 4 trips to tend wounded soldiers and to carry them to the safety of the platoon position. Seeing a fifth wounded comrade directly in front of one of the enemy strong points, Pfc. Shea ran to his assistance. As he reached the wounded man, Pfc. Shea was grievously wounded. Disregarding his welfare, Pfc. Shea tended his wounded comrade and began to move him back to the safety of the defensive perimeter. As he neared the platoon position, Pfc. Shea was mortally wounded by a burst of enemy fire. By his heroic actions Pfc. Shea saved the lives of several of his fellow soldiers. Pfc. Shea's gallantry in action at the cost of his life were in keeping with the highest traditions of the military service and reflect great credit upon himself, his unit, and the U.S. Army.

== See also ==
- List of Medal of Honor recipients
- List of Medal of Honor recipients for the Vietnam War
