= Coastal Connecticut =

Region of American state

Coastal Connecticut, often called the Connecticut Shore or the Connecticut Shoreline, comprises all of Connecticut's southern border along Long Island Sound, from Greenwich in the west to Stonington in the east, as well as the tidal portions of the Housatonic River, Quinnipiac River, Connecticut River, and Thames River. It includes the southern sections of the state's Fairfield, New Haven, Middlesex and New London counties.

Coastal Connecticut has a modestly different local culture than inland Connecticut. Many of the residents of coastal Connecticut are much more tied to coastal activity (i.e. boating, beaches) and the region sees an influx of tourists in the May to October season, compared to inland Connecticut. Coastal Connecticut is the mildest area in Connecticut in winter and often has a frost-free season that is up to one month longer than inland areas. Snowfall in coastal Connecticut is often light and melts quickly due to the oceanic influences. The region, as defined in the Connecticut General Statutes, consists of 36 Connecticut towns, including several of the largest in Connecticut.

== Towns in the coastal area ==
This is a list of the towns and cities of Coastal Connecticut listed in geographical order from west to east.

- Greenwich
- Stamford
- Darien
- Norwalk
- Westport
- Fairfield
- Bridgeport
- Stratford
- Milford
- West Haven
- New Haven
- East Haven
- Branford
- Guilford
- Madison
- Clinton
- Westbrook
- Old Saybrook
- Old Lyme
- East Lyme
- Waterford
- New London
- Groton
- Stonington
