= Norwalk Harbor =

- Interactive map of Norwalk Harbor

Location
- Country: United States
- Location: Norwalk, Connecticut
- Coordinates: 41°05′24″N 73°24′21″W

Details
- Type of Harbor: recreational and small commercial
- No. of berths: 1800 berths, 500+ moorings (small craft)
- No. of wharfs: 5
- Harbor master: Michael Griffin

Statistics
- Annual cargo tonnage: 512,000 short tons (in 2001)
- Website https://www.norwalkct.org/HarborComm/index.htm

Norwalk Harbor is a recreational and commercial harbor and seaport at the estuary of the Norwalk River where it flows into Long Island Sound in Norwalk, Connecticut, United States.

The last portion of the Norwalk River from the head of navigation near Wall Street in Central Norwalk to the Long Island Sound forms Norwalk Harbor. It is a federal navigation channel of the "recreational and small commercial harbor" variety.

In and around the harbor there are 15 marinas, 13 private clubs with boating facilities, and 5 commercial port facilities. There are more than 1800 berthing spaces and more than 500 harbor mooring locations. About 800 boats may be launched from storage racks at marinas and clubs as well as via the city maintained launching ramp in Veterans Park. More than 2700 commercial vessel trips to and from the harbor occur each year. The main harbor channel is small enough to restrict the size of vessels that could attempt to use it. In 2001 waterborne commerce in the harbor totaled 512,000 short tons (464,000 t). Typical freight included fuel oil, sand, gravel, stone, and shellfish (particularly oysters and lobsters).

== Description ==
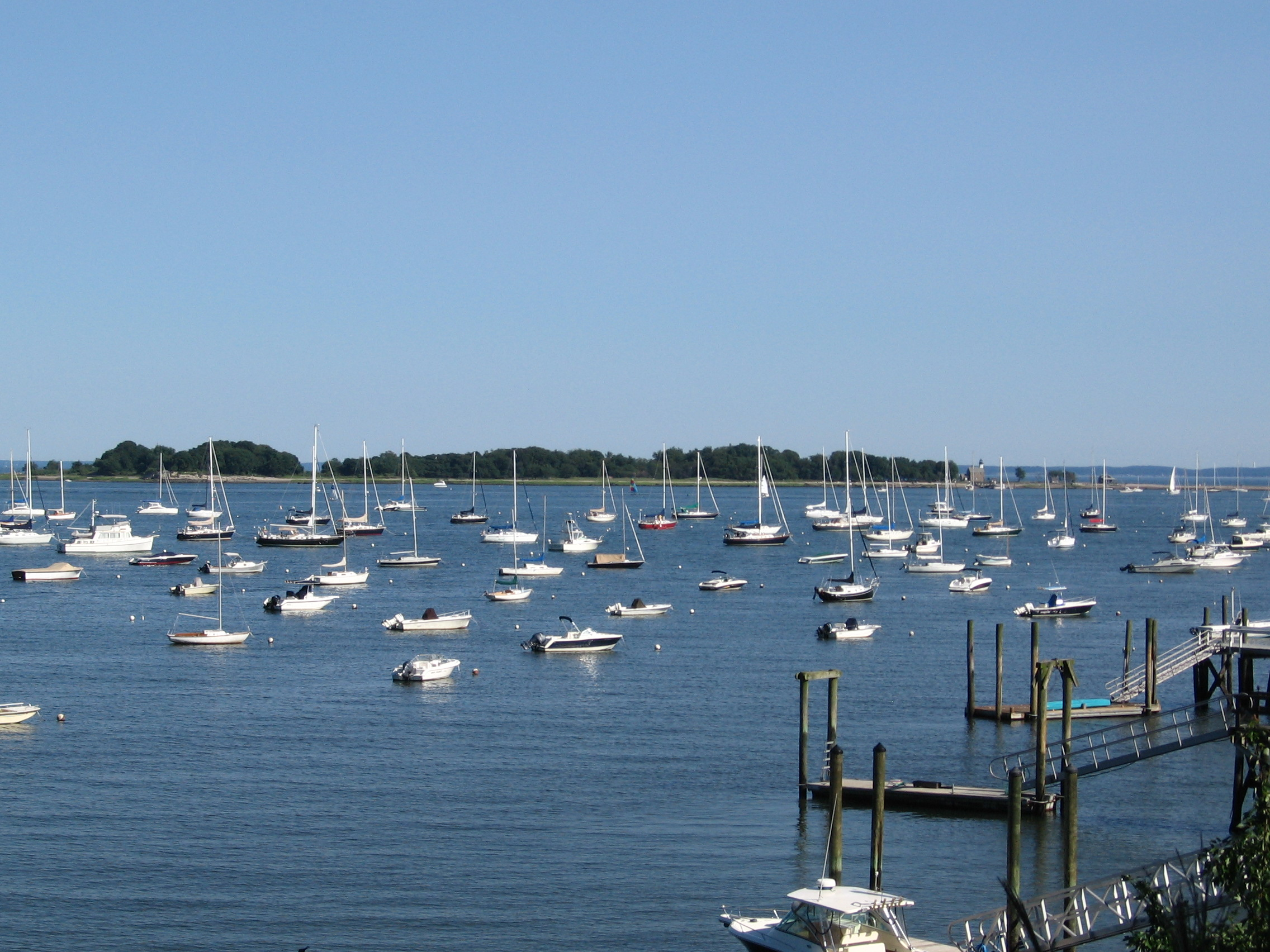
Sheffield Island as seen from Rowayton across the Sheffield harbor southwest entrance to Norwalk harbor

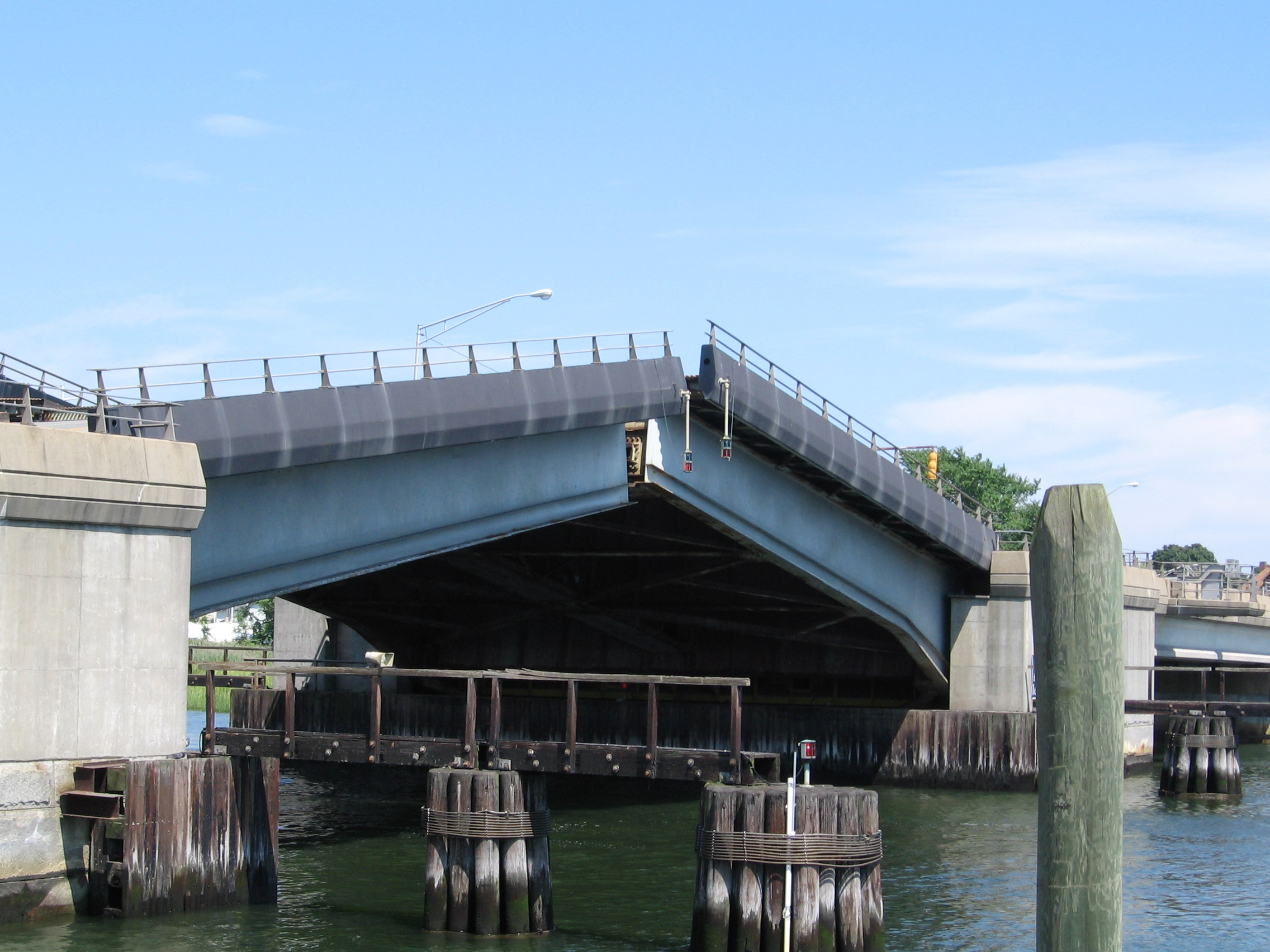
The Stroffolino memorial bascule bridge carries Washington Street over the river at the beginning of the inner harbor.

From the sound the main approach to the harbor lies to the southwest of Rowayton and Sheffield Island. The wider and deeper southwest approach is also known as "Sheffield Harbor", whereas the narrower and shallower eastern approach is known as "Cockenoe Harbor. There is a 4.7-mile (7.6 km)-long channel extending from the outer harbor to the head of the harbor in Norwalk. The channel is 12 feet (3.7 m) deep and 200 feet (61 m) wide from the outer harbor to Gregory Point in East Norwalk, where it narrows to 150 feet (46 m) wide up to the wharves at South Norwalk. The channel then widens to 250 feet (76 m) along the wharves to the Washington Street (Stroffolino) Bridge. Upstream of the Washington Street Bridge the inner harbor lies along 1.5 miles (2.4 km) of the river. The channel of the inner harbor is 10 feet (3.0 m) deep and between 100–200 feet (30–61 m) wide until it terminates at the head of the harbor at the Wall Street bridge in central Norwalk. There is an anchorage area 10 feet (3.0 m) deep and 17 acres (6.9 ha) in area on the east side of the channel in the vicinity of Fitch Point in East Norwalk. There is also a 0.6-mile (0.97 km)-long, six-foot-deep channel, 125–150 feet (38–46 m) wide, extending northeast from the 10-foot (3.0 m) anchorage opposite Fitch Point to the head of the harbor at East Norwalk. Another six-foot-deep anchorage area lies adjacent to the head of the harbor at East Norwalk.

=== List of inner harbor crossings ===
From the head of navigation at Wall Street traveling out to the outer harbor there are:

- Wall Street Bridge is an arch bridge in Central Norwalk
- Yankee Doodle Bridge is a girder bridge that carries the Connecticut Turnpike
- Norwalk River Railroad Bridge four track swing bridge of Amtrak and the Metro-North Railroad
- Washington Street, Stroffolino memorial, is a bascule bridge that carries Route 136

There are no bridges across the outer harbor or the approach channels.

== History ==
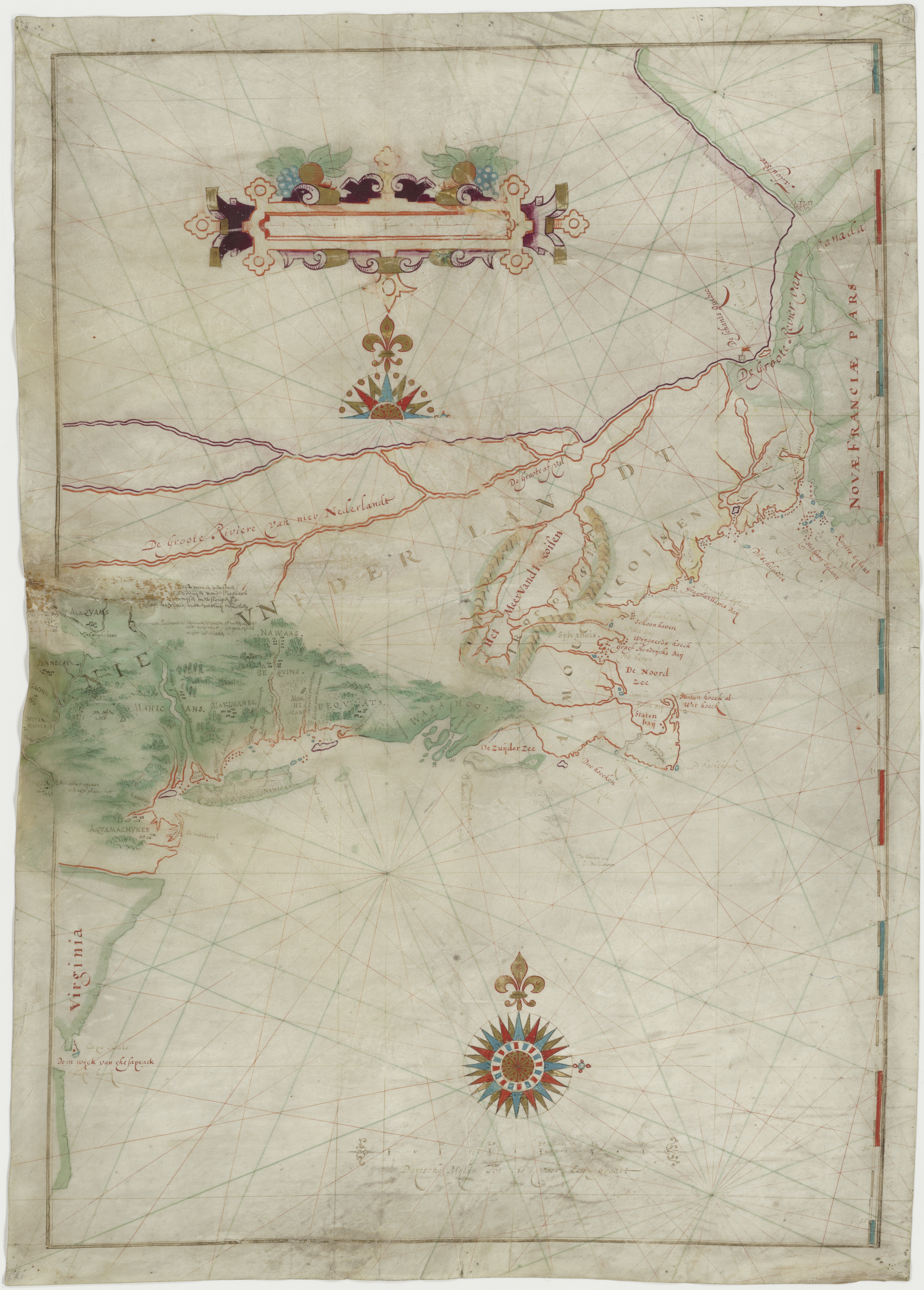
Adriaen Block's map of New Netherland from his 1614 voyage depicts the southern shore of Connecticut

In 1614 Dutch navigator Adriaen Block explored the Connecticut coast aboard the Onrust and mapped the Norwalk Islands which lie at the outer boundary of the harbor. He referred to the group of islands as the "Archipelago".

As an aid to navigation at the harbor channel entrance the Sheffield Island Light was operational by 1826 (on what was called "Smith Island" at the time). In 1872 the U.S. Army Corps of Engineers started its first work on harbor improvements in Norwalk. On January 21, 1897, the United States Congress agreed to spend $73,100.00 on aids to navigation in Norwalk Harbor including lights and fog signals. As a result of the expenditure Greens Ledge Light was operational by 1902 and Pecks Ledge Light was operational by 1906. The Sheffield Island light was discontinued as a federally maintained aid to navigation when the Greens Ledge Light was activated.

The Ischoda Yacht Club was founded in 1886 along the western shore of Norwalk Harbor in South Norwalk and is among America's oldest Yacht Clubs. The Norwalk Yacht Club was formed in August 1894 in Wilson's Cove.

The U.S. Army Corps of Engineers dredged the harbor in 1950.

In October 1955 a great flood washed down the Norwalk River and destroyed many of the buildings adjacent to the riverbanks. Today's Freese Park along Main Avenue was a built up commercial block before October 1955. The flood left a wake of destruction in the harbor that took a long time to recover from.

The Connecticut Turnpike was built over the river in 1956-1958. The salt marsh just south of the Yankee Doodle bridge on the river's west bank was turned into a garbage dump, but has since been closed, capped, and turned into "Oyster Shell Park" (not to be confused with the native Siwanoy shell middens across the river on the east bank near "Oyster bend").

The Norwalk Harbor Commission was established in 1984 by the Norwalk City Council. The commission is responsible for maintaining a Harbor Management plan that includes maintaining the safe navigation in the harbor, policies for the harbor master, the promotion of the harbor, and the maintenance of the Visitors dock at Veterans Park.

The U.S. Army Corps of Engineers finished harbor re-dredging projects in 1980 and again in 2006. There will be a new dredging project for the inner and river portions of the harbor.

In the spring of 2007 the Marine Unit of the Norwalk Police department launched a new 38-foot (12 m) police boat the Riva. On July 10, 2007 the Norwalk Fire Department commissioned its first fireboat the Harry Bower named to honor a fire fighter who died in 2005. In the fall of 2007 the harbor was visited by the Seafair a 228-foot (69 m) motor yacht. The visit of the Seafair was accompanied by private viewings of objects in the vessel's art galleries.

A utility project in the fall of 2007 replaced an electric power transmission line that runs from Connecticut to Long Island. Seven fluid-filled cables originally laid in 1969 were replaced with three new solid dielectric cables. The existing cables are joined at the oil-fired electric generating substation on Manresa Island in Norwalk Harbor. From there, they cross under Norwalk Harbor and Long Island Sound to connect at the Long Island Power Authority’s substation in the village of Northport, New York. The three new 11-mile (18 km) long cables were buried at least one fathom (2 m) below the Sound’s bottom.

The Skyline Princess, a 120-foot (37 m) motor yacht out of New York, makes port of call stops at Veterans Park.

== Geology ==
The harbor is a "drowned river valley" flooded as the sea rose at the end of the last ice age. Bedrock under the harbor and in the Harborview and Calf Pasture Beach area is interlayered Ordovician trap falls gneisses and Harrison Gneiss with dark minerals hornblende, biotite and garnet. The bedrock has two folds in the harbor area. The earlier, more southerly one was formed at the same time as the Taconic Mountains. That fault runs from Bell Island through Manresa Island to Sprite Island. The second (created during the Acadian mountain-building event of 485–440 million years ago) runs along a line north from Noroton Point on Sheffield Island Harbor toward Exit 15 on Interstate 95.

== See also ==
- Calf Pasture Beach
- East Norwalk
- Maritime Aquarium at Norwalk
- Norwalk Islands
- Norwalk Oyster Festival
- Norwalk River
- South Norwalk
- Stewart B. McKinney National Wildlife Refuge

=== Notes and references ===
- "Norwalk Harbor". Geographic Names Information System. United States Geological Survey, United States Department of the Interior.
