= Norwalk Islands =

American island chain

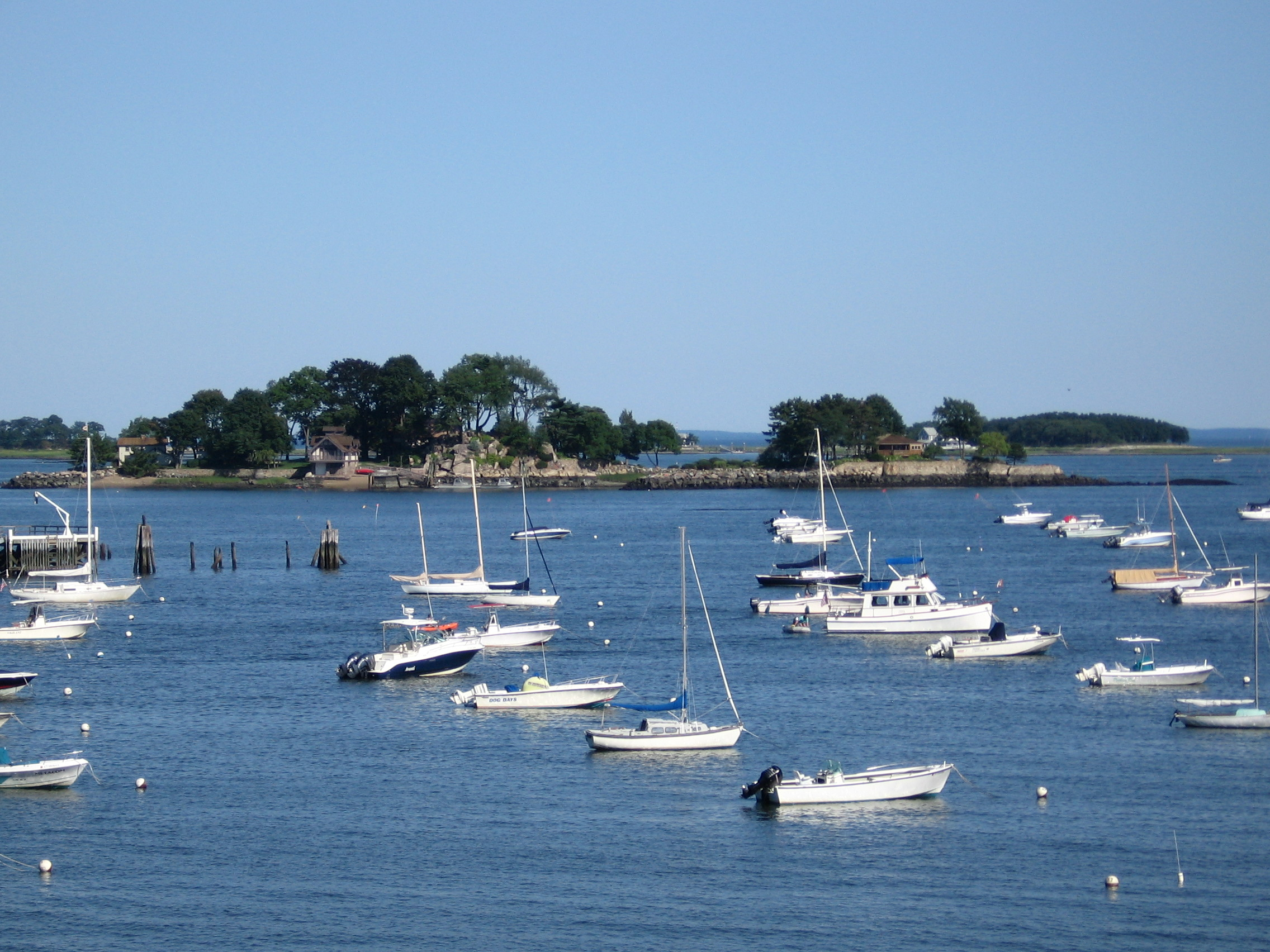
- Tavern Island, with Ram Island behind it to the right

- Location within Connecticut

Geography
- Location: Norwalk and Westport
- Coordinates: 41°3′54″N 73°23′24″W
- Archipelago: Norwalk Islands
- Total islands: 25+
- Major islands: Chimon, Cockenoe, Shea, Sheffield

Administration
- United States
- State: Connecticut

Demographics
- Population: 0
- Pop. density: 0/sq mi (0/km^{2})

The Norwalk Islands are a chain of more than 25 islands amid partly submerged boulders, reefs and mudflats along a six-mile (10 km) stretch and mostly about a mile off the coast of Norwalk, Connecticut, and southwest Westport, Connecticut, in Long Island Sound.

The islands are used for several different types of recreational activities, including camping, boating, kayaking, swimming, and bird watching. Ownership of the islands varies, with about a half dozen held in private hands, some owned by the governments of Norwalk or Westport and some are part of the Stewart B. McKinney National Wildlife Refuge.

Various laws protect the islands, including town ordinances, the Coastal Barrier Resources Act, the National Wildlife Refuge System Administration Act of 1966, and the Endangered Species Act. On a clear day, Manhattan's skyscrapers are visible.

Geologists generally consider the islands to be terminal moraines—material left by glaciers—deposited about 17,500 years ago as the ice cap paused in its retreat northward. Above water, the moraines are characterized by various rocks, gravel, sand, silt and clay, sometimes sorted out by waves. The Captain islands in Greenwich to the west are part of the same moraine (but not the Fish islands in Darien), and submerged parts of the same moraine are located between the Norwalk Islands and Charles Island, off Milford, to the east. (That island is probably part of the Hammonasset-Ledyard Moraine.)

Some historians have speculated that rocks from the islands were used as ballast for sailing ships returning to New York, where the rocks may have been used for cobblestones.

== Recreation ==
No fresh water is provided at any of the islands.

=== Kayaking ===
The islands are popular with kayakers, with some paddling all the way from New York City. Tidal currents are gentle, the mainland is always visible and the electric power plant on Manresa Island helps with navigation (although if fog hits it can cause sudden and complete disorientation). Public boat launches and beaches are nearby, and some businesses in Norwalk rent kayaks.

The South Western Regional Planning Agency published a brochure for kayakers describing a "Norwalk Islands Canoe and Kayak Trail" showing full-day and half-day loops. Guided tours are also available by kayak.

=== Fishing, clamming and hunting ===
Striped bass, bluefish, fluke, flounder, false albacore, bonito, trout, and dogfish can be caught off the islands. Some clamming beds off the islands are seeded.

In duck-hunting season, hunters may hunt below the mean high-tide line. Deer can be hunted on the privately owned islands with the owner's permission.

=== Bird watching ===
Rookeries were previously on many of the islands, but now most are on Cockenoe. Herons, egrets, black cormorants can be seen on Cockenoe.

== Wildlife ==
Deer swim to the islands. Harbor seals are increasingly seen at the southwest end of Sheffield Island, although authorities have asked boaters to remain at least 50 yards (46 m) from them in order not to disturb them (kayaks are about the same size as some seal predators). The Marine Mammal Protection Act prohibits harassing the animals and sets limits on how close observers may get.

Flora include thorn thickets, wild blackberries, black cherry, bittersweet, sassafras, juniper and honeysuckle.

Many birds are found on Sheffield Island and more than elsewhere, according to a brochure published in 2001 by the South Western Regional Planning Agency, but according to a July 2007 article in Darien, New Canaan & Rowayton magazine, Cockenoe island is now the largest home for birds, who have been in decline on the other islands. Sheffield Island, according to the planning agency brochure, has a "considerable nesting potential" for osprey, herons and other migratory species. Many wading birds, shore birds, songbirds and terns live on the island, including the roseate tern. Brant, scoters, black duck and other waterfowl can be found in the waters surrounding the island.

== Largest islands ==
=== Chimon Island ===
At 59 acres (24 ha) Chimon is the largest of the islands and is located in the middle of the group and a bit less than a mile to the southeast of the entrance to Norwalk Harbor. The island is part of the Stewart B. McKinney National Wildlife Refuge.

The north and west coasts of the island are gravelly, and boulders are strewn along the south and east coasts. Although boaters may land at the three-acre beach at the northwest shore during the day, year round, access to the rest of the island is restricted from April 1 to August 15 each year (bird-nesting season). No overnight camping is allowed. Chimon Island is at 41.065°N 73.39°W.

=== Cockenoe Island ===
Owned by the Westport town government, the island (Pronounced "koh-KEE-nee" or "kuh-KEE-nee") has almost all the bird rookeries in the chain. Herons, egrets, black cormorants can be seen on Cockenoe. The cormorants' guano, which leaves some of the rocks white, is toxic to the trees and kills them off after the birds nest in a spot for less than a year. Overnight camping is allowed by the town Conservation Department, but for only four parties per night. Cockenoe Island is at 41.085°N 73.355°W. It is named after the prominent Indian translator, Cockenoe.

==== History ====
An early rumor about the island was that William Kidd buried a treasure there. In the 19th century, the island was a working farm with a farmhouse, barn, and livestock. The business eventually turned into a whisky distillery, which the federal government raided in 1870. In the 1960s, The United Illuminating Company planned to build a nuclear power plant on Cockenoe. Due to concerned local residents and the threat of eminent domain, Westport bought the island for $200,000 in 1967.

=== Shea Island ===
Once called "Ram Island", the 45 acres (18 ha) isle was renamed after Daniel Shea, a Congressional Medal of Honor recipient from Norwalk who died in the Vietnam War. Owned by Norwalk city government, the island is just northeast of Sheffield Island and about 4,000 yards (3,700 m) south of Manressa Island.

Along with Grassy Island, Shea is open to the public from May through Columbus Day, and campers with a permit can stay overnight. Two solar-powered restrooms are available in season, and there are 16 campsites. The entire shoreline is strewn with rocks and boulders, making it a more difficult place to approach by boat. Shea Island is at 41.0595°N 73.402°W.

Previously, Shea Island was officially called Smith Island. It was also once known as Nauvoo Island among local Latter-day Saints.

=== Sheffield Island ===
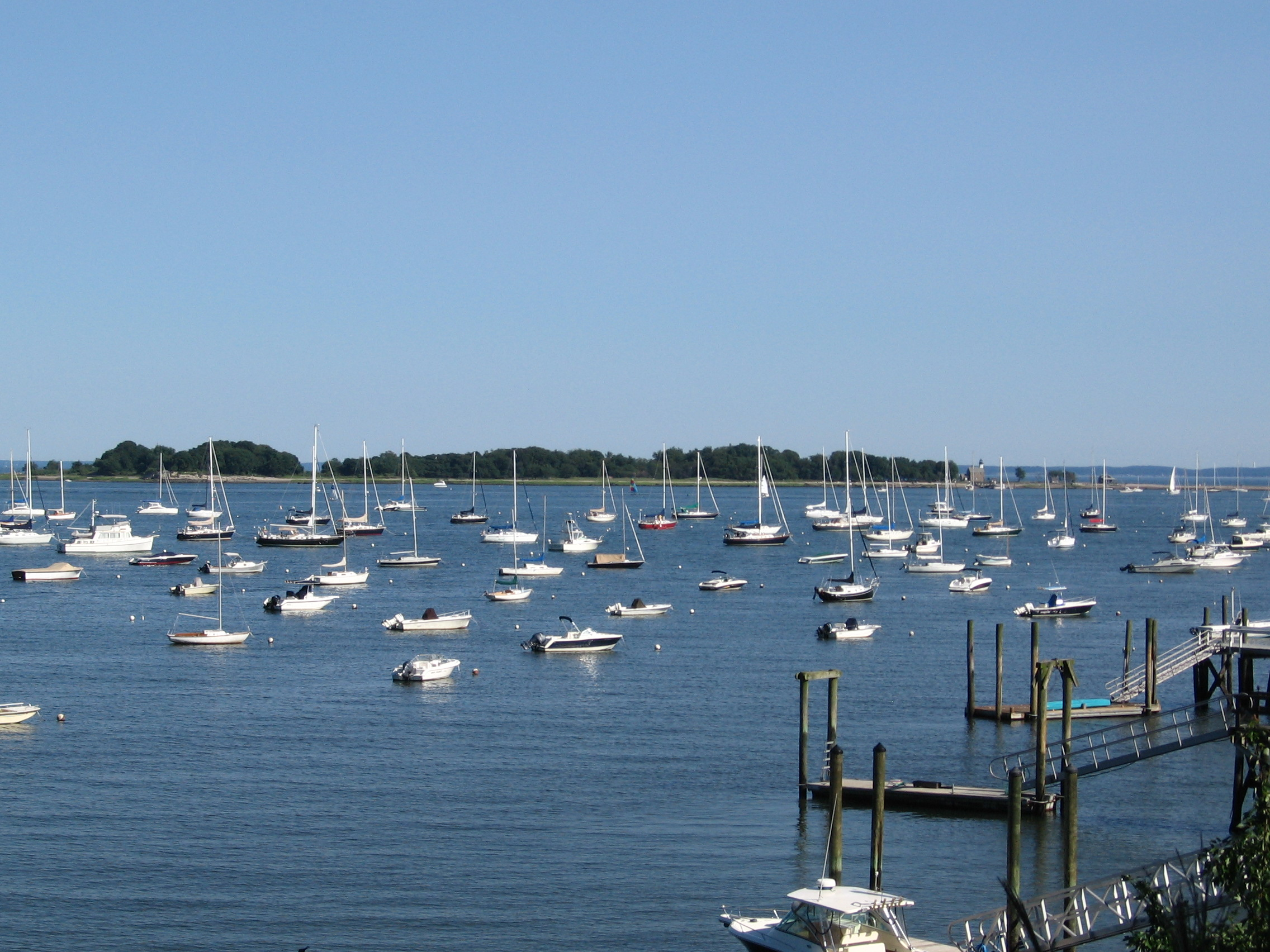
Sheffield Island as seen from the west

At 51 acres (21 ha), Sheffield is the second largest island in the group, and the most southerly, located about 1,500 yards (1,400 m) from the Norwalk coast and just southwest of Shea Island. The entire shoreline is strewn with rocks and boulders.

Many bird species nest on the island. Sheffield is also one of the best places to see seals. The Maritime Aquarium at Norwalk organizes boat trips circling the islands, including a cruise to see the fall foliage and a winter cruise to see harbor seals and waterfowl (see Wildlife section for more information).

Part of the Stewart B. McKinney National Wildlife Refuge, the island is controlled by the U.S. Fish and Wildlife Service, which closes it to the public most of the year in order to protect the bird nesting areas, The public is usually restricted to the 3.5 acres (1.4 ha) around the Sheffield Island Light, which the Norwalk Seaport Association maintains, although a 2,000-yard (1,800 m) trail has been created to allow the public controlled access. In the summer, the association arranges tours for people to visit the lighthouse and picnic there. On Thursday nights, clambakes and on Friday nights, sunset cruises are held. The lighthouse, built in 1868, was a navigational aid until about 1900. Sheffield Island is at 41.052°N 73.415°W.

== Smaller islands ==
These other islands are in the group:

- Betts Island — located about 400 yards (370 m) north of Chimon Island. Privately owned. Betts Island is at 41.072°N 73.389°W.
- Calf Pasture Island — located almost 1,000 yards (910 m) to the southeast of Calf Pasture Beach. Calf Pasture Island is at 41.0825°N 73.384°W.
- Copps Island — located close to the southeast end of Crow Island. Copps Island is at 41.0589°N 73.387°W.
- Crow Island — located 300 yards (270 m) to the southeast of Chimon Island. Crow Island is at 41.061°N 73.3905°W.
- Grassy Island — located 300 yards (270 m) to the northeast of Chimon Island. Owned by Norwalk city government. Grassy Island has a better boat landing area than Shea Island. Open to the public May through Columbus Day. Campers with permits can stay overnight at one of the four camp sites. Grassy Island is at 41.071°N 73.382°W.
- Goose Island — located about 1,000 yards (910 m) east of Grassy Island. Some say that scientific research was done on the island to find a cure for yellow fever. Others say the small stone hut on its shore was built as a spy lookout during World War II. Goose Island is at 41.071°N 73.372°W.
- Hoyt Island — located close to the coast of Norwalk. Hoyt Island is at 41.074°N 73.4195°W.
- Little Tavern Island — located about 150 yards (140 m) northeast of Tavern Island. Little Tavern Island is at 41.0630°N 73.4201°W.
- Long Island — located about 300 yards (270 m) east of the southern end of Manressa Island. Long Island is at 41.0729°N 73.4034°W.
- Peach Island — located about 100 yards (91 m) east of the Harborview neighborhood in South Norwalk. This island is part of the McKinney Wildlife Refuge and is off limits to visitation. Peach Island is at 41.083°N 73.4055°W.
- Sprite Island — located about 300 yards (270 m) to the northeast of Calf Pasture Beach and about 700 yards (640 m) north of Calf Pasture Island. In the 1940s, the island was the summer home of a New York City financier. It is home to the Sprite Island Yacht Club, which bought the island from its former owner in 1952. The former owner bred collies, and the club turned the kennels into lockers. A rocky bluff is at one end of the island, and at another is a small, protected, rocky beach. It takes about 20 minutes to walk around the entire isle. Sprite Island is at 41.09°N 73.381°W.
- Tavern Island — located about 500 yards (460 m) from Wilson Point and 1,000 yards (910 m) north of Sheffield Island, it has a private mansion with grounds and walkways. Showman Billy Rose once owned Tavern Island. Tavern Island is at 41.0605°N 73.422°W.
- Tree Hammock Island — located about 2,000 feet (610 m) south of Manresa Island and 1,000 feet (300 m) north of Shea Island. Tree Hammock Island is at 41.0649°N 73.4053°W.
