= Maritime Aquarium at Norwalk =

Aquarium in Norwalk, Connecticut

The Maritime Aquarium at Norwalk
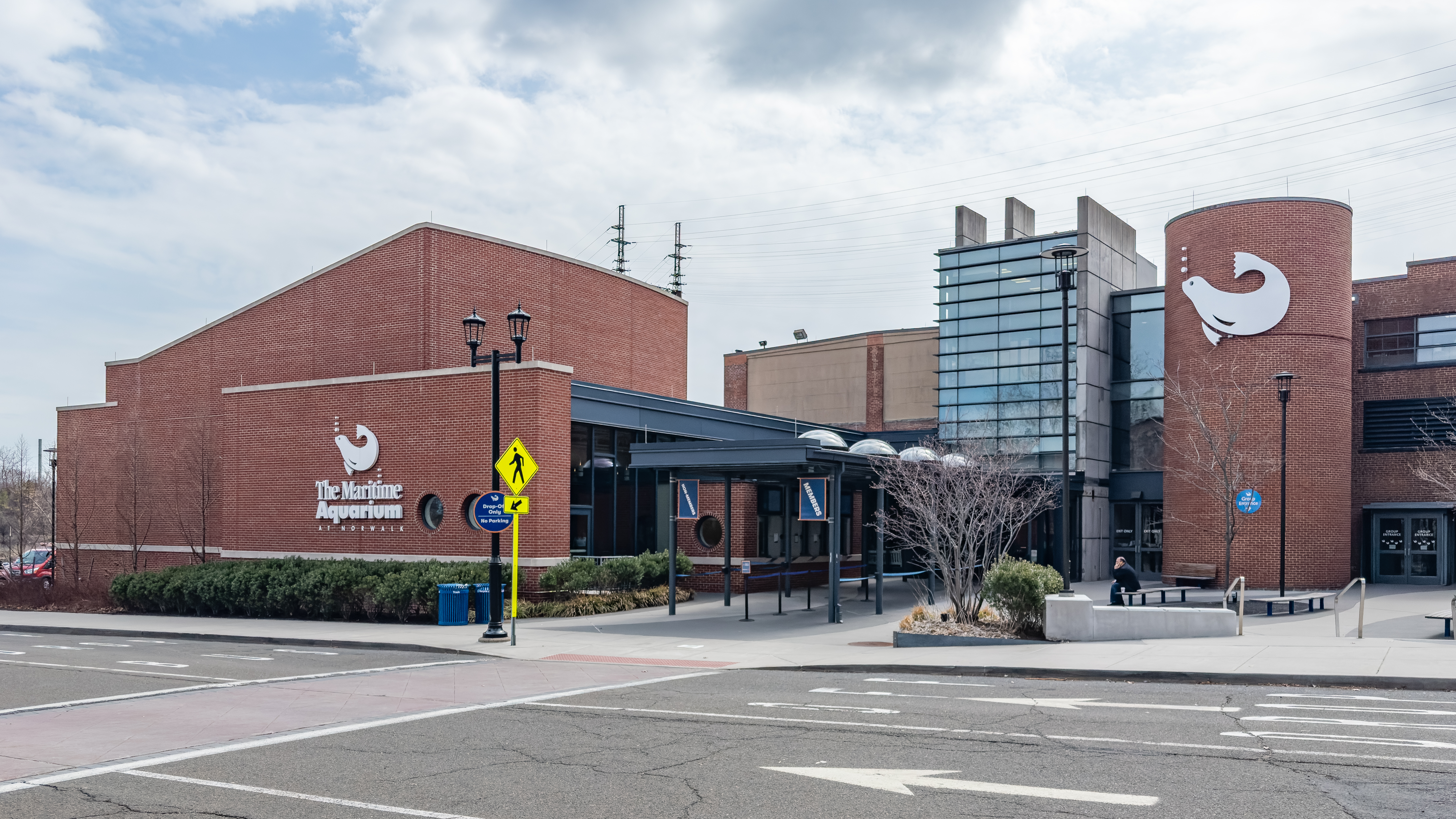
- North side entrance of the Maritime Aquarium
- Interactive map of The Maritime Aquarium at Norwalk
- 41.101°N 73.4164°W
- Date opened: July 16, 1988
- Location: Norwalk, Connecticut
- Land area: 140,000 sq. ft.
- No. of animals: 8,000
- No. of species: 300
- Annual visitors: 500,000
- Public transit: South Norwalk
- Website: www.maritimeaquarium.org

Maritime Aquarium (formerly Maritime Center and The Maritime Aquarium at Norwalk) is an aquarium located in the South Norwalk (or "SoNo") section of Norwalk, Connecticut.

Maritime Aquarium is the only aquarium devoted to Long Island Sound, the "Estuary of National Significance" just outside its doors. Its marine population includes a variety of sharks, stingrays, harbor seals, sea turtles, otters, jellies, crabs, lobsters, and more. Maritime Aquarium also exhibits tropical travelers that follow the Gulf Stream north to Long Island Sound. Plus, it has some other fun animals, from tamarins to meerkats. Maritime Aquarium offers lots of touch experiences, including sturgeon, stingrays, sharks, jellyfish, and intertidal animals.

In addition to its exhibits, the Aquarium offers educational programs, year-round cruises, birthday parties, sleepovers, summer camps and special events.

== Mission ==
Maritime Aquarium's mission is to ignite a connection to Long Island Sound and the ocean to enrich the lives of all people and inspire action to protect our blue planet.

== Attendance & Economic Impact ==
Maritime Aquarium is one of Connecticut's top tourist attractions. Annual attendance averages 500,000 visitors. Maritime Aquarium's estimated statewide economic impact is approximately $89 million; it contributes approximately $56 million to Norwalk's economy annually.

== History ==
The "Maritime Center" opened July 16, 1988. The name was changed to "The Maritime Aquarium at Norwalk" in July 1996 to emphasize the live animals featured there.

It first opened by renovating a former 1860s iron works factory into an IMAX theater. Visitors, as they walk past the Ray Touch Pool toward the Marine Lab, still tread on the original wood floors (under original wood beams) of the iron works. Occupying approximately 100,000 gross square feet, the first animal exhibits included harbor seals, Open Ocean and Touch Tank.

The cultural section of the aquarium originally explored boat building and human exploration of the sea, but the boatbuilding activities were eliminated in early 2007. In the final seven years of its 19-year run, the boatbuilding program constructed about 500 boats, and 20,000 children took part in classes that created more than 5,000 model boats, but aquarium officials said the shop only served three to five percent of patrons.

The boatbuilding shop was replaced with a new Marine Lab, with baby seahorses, jellyfish, and other new animals, as well as information on aquaculture, sustainable seafood, and responsible home aquarium keeping.

- 1991: Exhibit space is expanded by adding the 7,000-square-foot (650 m^{2}) "Featured Exhibits" area, a semi-permanent fabric and steel structure. The first exhibit is Real Sea Monsters, featuring extinct sea creatures like Kronosaurus and Megalodon.
- 1994: Outdoor exhibit space, including bleachers, is added along the Norwalk River for summertime exhibits and shows. It opens with a bird-of-prey show.
- 1995: Jellyfish Encounter opens. Aquarium curators solve significant challenges to display these delicate animals that are approximately 95% water.
- 1996: The Maritime Center changes its name to The Maritime Aquarium at Norwalk, to better identify itself to the public and underscore the increasing importance of live animal exhibits. River Otters and Ray Touch Pool open.
- 2001: The aquarium expands into the Hatch and Bailey factory building, converting and rehabilitating 33,000 square feet (3,100 m^{2}) of space into a new, $9.5 million Environmental Education Center (funded through corporate, private and state contributions). New space allows a reconfiguring of the existing aquarium:
  - Giant Sea Turtles opens, including a 15,000-gallon habitat, interpretive signs, and turtle shell photo opportunity.
  - A new main entrance improves visitor reception and admission.
  - New Oyster Hall (group orientation space and lunchroom) opens just off of the main entrance, which allow for staging and organizing busloads of visiting students.
  - New high-tech classrooms (with multimedia and wet lab facilities) are added, as are teachers' rooms, to expand the Maritime Aquarium's educational programs.
  - Cascade Cafe opens with seating for 180 people.
  - Gift shop moves and expands.
- 2006: Touch Tank is moved and greatly enhanced, creating a more natural display, allowing animals to live "on-site" and offering better access to visitors. The aquarium's volunteer staff funds reconstruction.
- 2007: Frogs! opens, a new permanent exhibit displaying amphibians from Long Island Sound's shores and watershed, as well as exotic species from around the world, to draw attention to the importance of amphibians as bellwether species for environmental change. The small boat building shop is closed.
- 2008: During the summer, the Great White Alligator is displayed in the outdoor exhibit space.
- 2009: African Penguins temporary outdoor exhibit opens.
- 2010: Temporary Meerkat Exhibit opens.
- 2012: FINtastic RefurbFISHment is unveiled with new sea life and hands-on-exhibits. The white alligator also returned to the aquarium for the summer.

In recent years, the Maritime Aquarium has emphasized helping visitors understand the ecology of Long Island Sound and its watershed. The aquarium participates in and directs local scientific research on Long Island Sound's animal residents, including a counting and tagging program for horseshoe crabs. Maritime Aquarium also helped create the Long Island Sound Biodiversity Database, which is open to the public.

In February 2021, the aquarium replaced its now-closed IMAX theatre with a new 4D movie theatre.

== Exhibits ==
Maritime Aquarium is approximately 140,000 square feet (13,000 m^{2}) and features more than 177,000 gallons of water in its live-animal exhibits. On exhibit are more than 2,700 animals representing more than 300 species.

As of 2026, exhibits include Pinniped Cove, Just Add Water, Journey with Jellies, Life Among the Grasses, Meerkats!, Jiggle-a-Jelly, Shark and Ray Touch Pool, among others.

== See also ==
- New York Aquarium, on Coney Island in the Brooklyn borough of New York City, is the closest aquarium to the Maritime Aquarium.
- Mystic Aquarium & Institute for Exploration is the only other aquarium in Connecticut and the only other aquarium on Long Island Sound.
- Long Island Aquarium in Riverhead, New York is a privately owned aquarium on the Peconic River at the eastern end of Long Island.
