= Norwalk, Connecticut =

- City
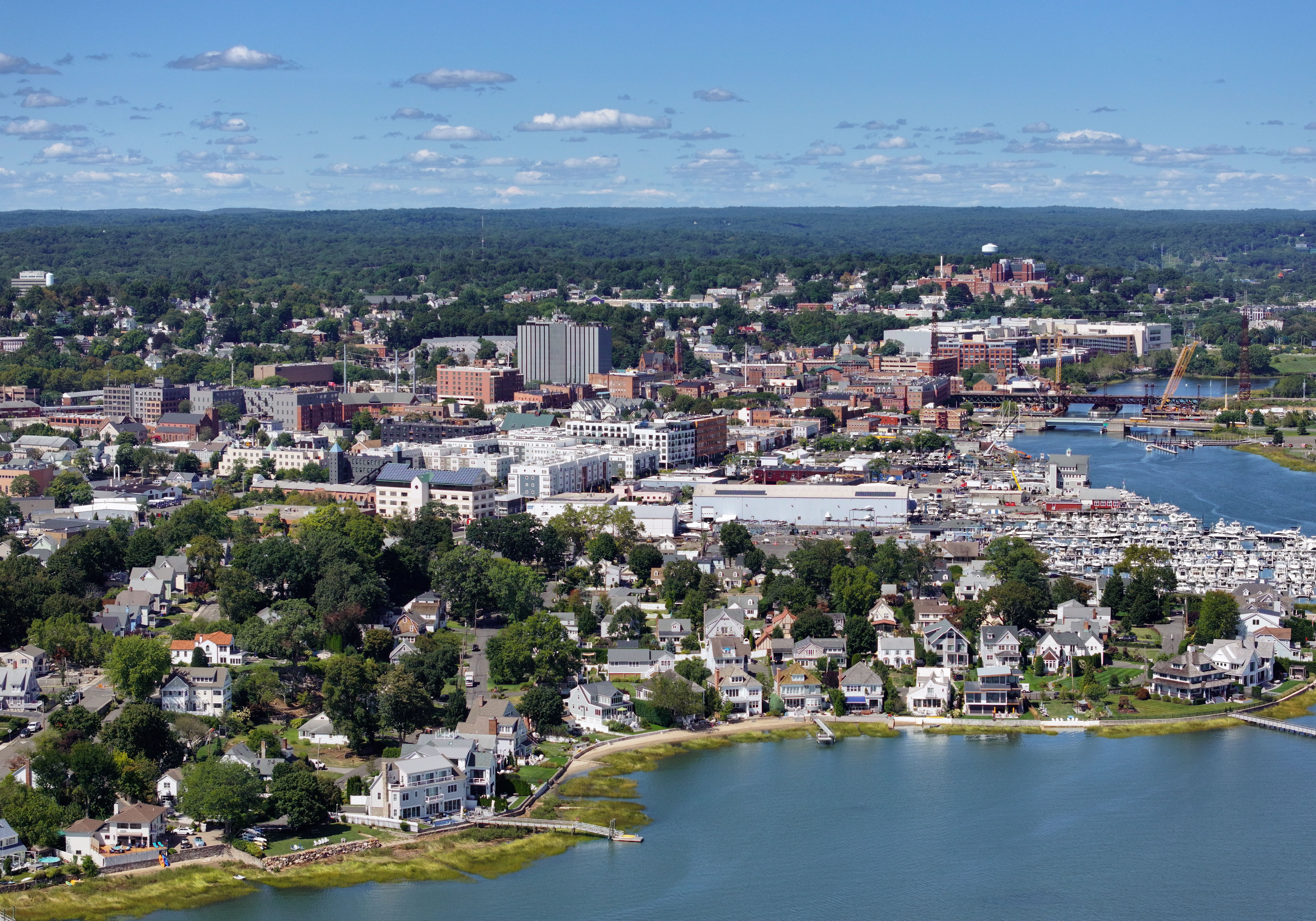
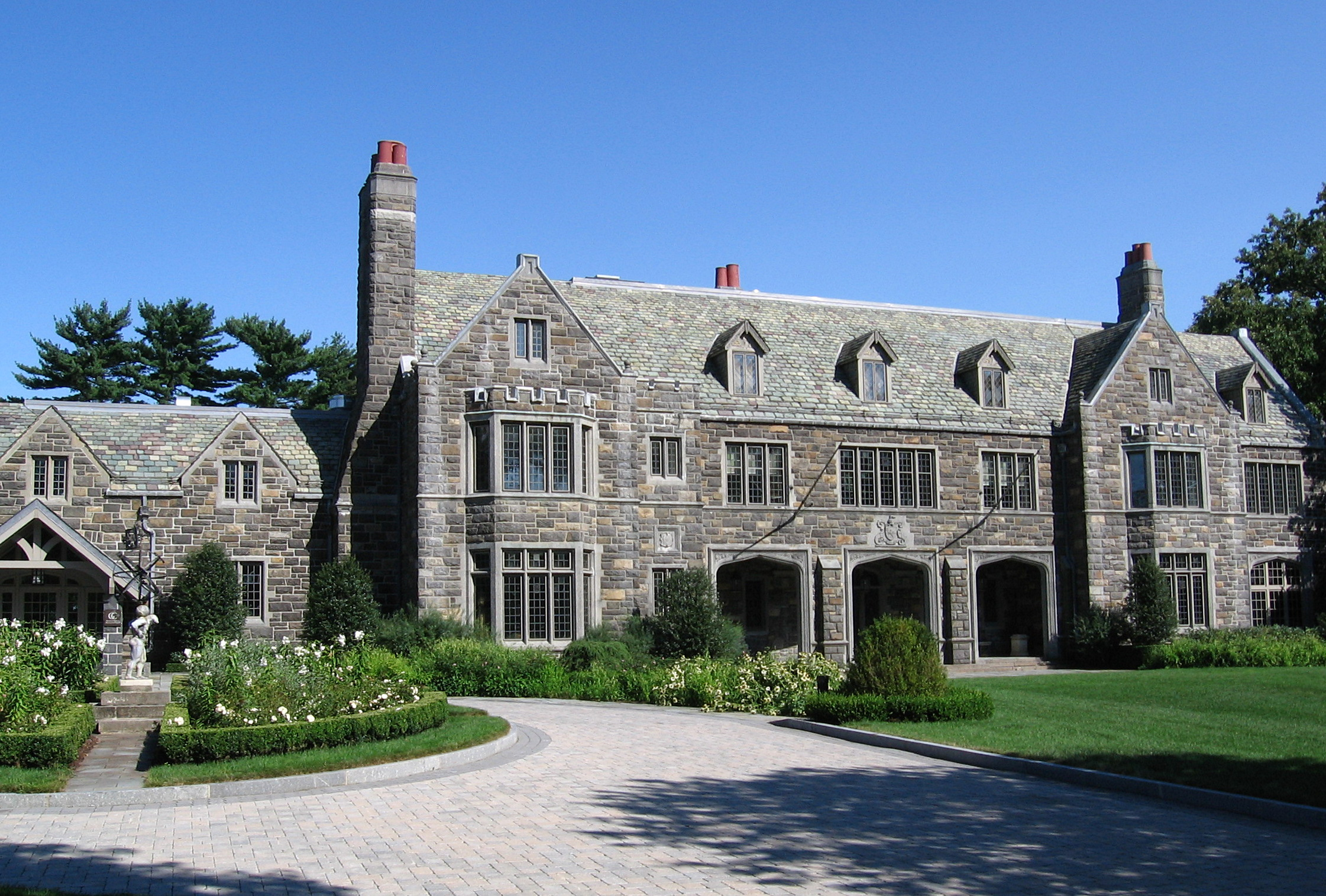
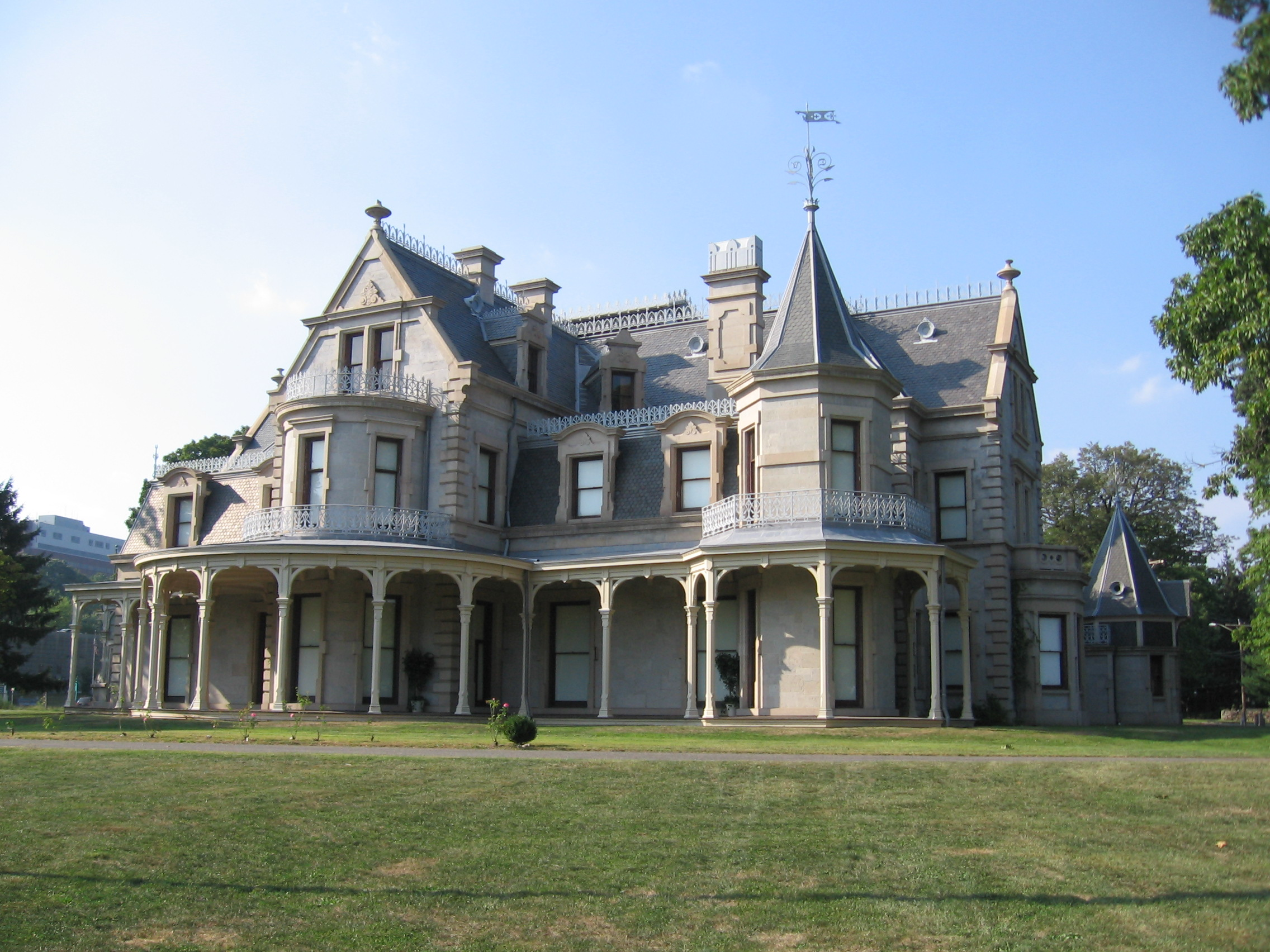
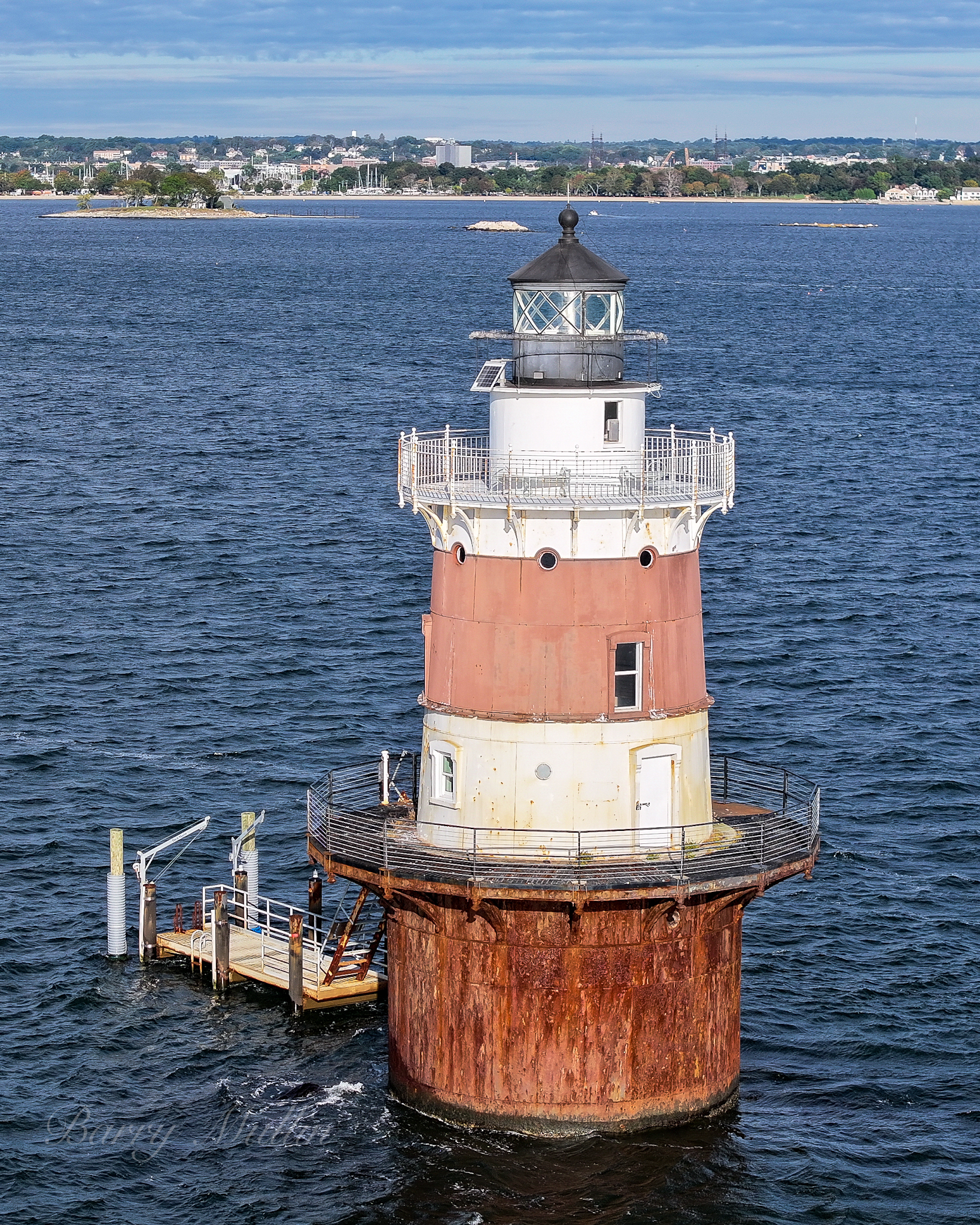
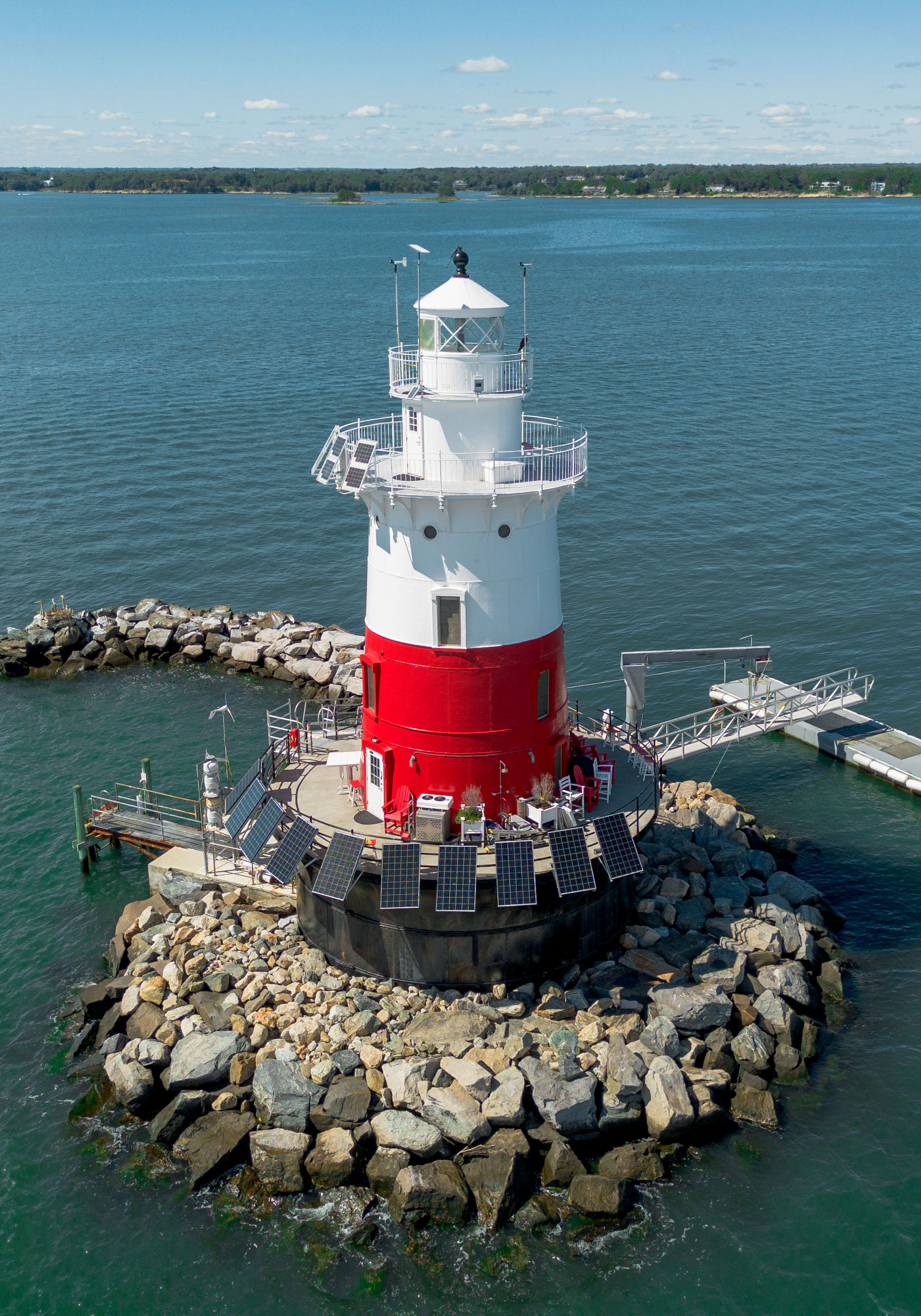
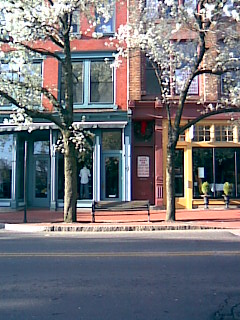
- Downtown Rock Ledge Lockwood–Mathews Mansion Peck Ledge Light Greens Ledge Lighthouse Historic District

- Flag Seal Logo
- Etymology: Mohegan-Pequot language
- Nickname: Oyster Town
- Motto: Latin: E Pluribus Unum
- Coordinates: 41°05′38″N 73°25′11″W
- Country: United States
- U.S. state: Connecticut
- County: Fairfield
- Region: Western CT
- Settled: February 26, 1640
- Incorporated: September 11, 1651
- Consolidated: June 6, 1913
- Founder: Roger Ludlow and Daniel Patrick

Government
  - Type: Weak mayor–council
  - Mayor: Barbara Smyth (D)

Area
  - Total: 36.37 sq mi (94.20 km^{2})
  - Land: 22.89 sq mi (59.28 km^{2})
  - Water: 13.49 sq mi (34.93 km^{2})
- Elevation: 43 ft (13 m)

Population (2020)
  - Total: 91,184
  - Estimate (2024): 93,567
  - Density: 3,983.90/sq mi (1,538.192/km^{2})
- Time zone: UTC−5 (Eastern Standard Time (EST))
  - Summer (DST): UTC−4 (Eastern Daylight Time (EDT))
- ZIP Codes: 06850–06860
- Area codes: 203/475
- FIPS code: 09-55990
- GNIS feature ID: 0209405
- Website: norwalkct.gov

Norwalk is a city in Fairfield County, Connecticut, United States. The city, part of the New York Metropolitan Area, is the sixth-most populous city in Connecticut as of the 2020 census, with a population of 91,184.. The city is part of the Western Connecticut Planning Region.

Norwalk is on the northern shore of Long Island Sound and was first settled in 1649.

== History ==
Roger Ludlow purchased the areas east of the Norwalk River from Chief Mahackemo of the Norwaake (or Naramauke) Indians in 1640. Norwalk was settled in 1649, incorporated September 1651, and named after the Algonquin word noyank, meaning "point of land", or more probably from the Native American name "Naramauke".

The Battle of Norwalk took place during the Revolutionary War, and led to the burning of most of the town. In 1836, the borough of Norwalk was created, covering the central area of the town. In 1853, the first ever train disaster in the United States happened over the Norwalk River. During the 19th and early 20th century, Norwalk was a major railroad stop for the New York, New Haven, and Hartford Railroad. The city of South Norwalk and the remaining parts of the town of Norwalk were both combined in 1910 to form the current city.

The Ku Klux Klan had a brief presence in Norwalk during the 1920s, but quickly fell apart due to internal issues. In 1955, multiple hurricanes hit the city, causing flooding in Norwalk Harbor. During the 1970s, efforts were taken to historically preserve South Norwalk, resulting in the creation of the Washington Street Historic District.

== Geography ==
According to the United States Census Bureau, the city has a total area of 36.3 square miles (94 km^{2}), of which 13.5 square miles (35 km^{2}) (37.24%) are covered by water.

=== Neighborhoods ===
- Broad River
- Brookside
- Central Norwalk
- Cranbury
- East Norwalk
- Golden Hill
- Hospital Hill
- Manresa Island
- Marvin Beach
- Oak Hills
- Rowayton
- Shorefront Park
- Silvermine
- South Norwalk
- Spring Hill
- Strawberry Hill
- Village Creek
- West Norwalk
- West Rocks
- Whistleville
- Wilson Point
- Wolfpit

=== Climate ===
Climate data for Norwalk, Connecticut
Month	Jan	Feb	Mar	Apr	May	Jun	Jul	Aug	Sep	Oct	Nov	Dec	Year
Record high °F (°C)	68 (20)	71 (22)	79 (26)	95 (35)	97 (36)	97 (36)	103 (39)	97 (36)	99 (37)	89 (32)	77 (25)	66 (19)	103 (39)
Mean daily maximum °F (°C)	37 (3)	39 (4)	48 (9)	60 (16)	70 (21)	79 (26)	84 (29)	82 (28)	75 (24)	64 (18)	52 (11)	42 (6)	61 (16)
Daily mean °F (°C)	28 (−2)	31 (−1)	40 (4)	50 (10)	60 (16)	69 (21)	74 (23)	72 (22)	64 (18)	53 (12)	43 (6)	34 (1)	52 (11)
Mean daily minimum °F (°C)	19 (−7)	21 (−6)	29 (−2)	38 (3)	44 (7)	57 (14)	62 (17)	61 (16)	53 (12)	40 (4)	33 (1)	24 (−4)	40 (5)
Record low °F (°C)	−15 (−26)	−7 (−22)	−2 (−19)	17 (−8)	30 (−1)	34 (1)	45 (7)	41 (5)	31 (−1)	17 (−8)	14 (−10)	−9 (−23)	−15 (−26)
Average precipitation inches (mm)	4.2 (110)	3.15 (80)	4.33 (110)	4.37 (111)	4.36 (111)	3.94 (100)	3.83 (97)	3.89 (99)	4.54 (115)	3.89 (99)	4.04 (103)	3.96 (101)	48.5 (1,236)
Average snowfall inches (cm)	9.3 (24)	8.3 (21)	4.9 (12)	.8 (2.0)	0 (0)	0 (0)	0 (0)	0 (0)	0 (0)	0 (0)	.7 (1.8)	4.6 (12)	28.6 (72.8)
Average precipitation days	10.5	9.7	10.9	12.5	12.5	11.7	10.2	9.7	9.8	9.2	10.6	11.3	128.6
Average snowy days	4.8	4.3	2.5	.4	0	0	0	0	0	0	.4	2.7	15.1
Source 1: NCDC
Source 2: The Weather Channel

=== Topography ===
Norwalk's topography is dominated by its coastline along Long Island Sound, the Norwalk River and its eastern and western banks, and the Norwalk Islands. The highest elevation is 315 feet (96 m) above sea level on the fairway of the 16th hole of the Silvermine Golf Course, and the low elevation is sea level on Long Island Sound.

== Demographics ==
Historical population
Census	Pop.	Note	%±
1790	11,942		—
1800	5,146		−56.9%
1810	2,983		−42.0%
1820	3,004		0.7%
1830	3,972		32.2%
1840	3,863		−2.7%
1850	4,651		20.4%
1860	7,582		63.0%
1870	12,119		59.8%
1880	13,956		15.2%
1890	17,747		27.2%
1900	19,932		12.3%
1910	24,211		21.5%
1920	27,743		14.6%
1930	36,019		29.8%
1940	39,849		10.6%
1950	49,460		24.1%
1960	67,775		37.0%
1970	79,288		17.0%
1980	77,767		−1.9%
1990	78,331		0.7%
2000	82,951		5.9%
2010	85,603		3.2%
2020	91,184		6.5%
1790 population included Stamford and Greenwich.

=== Racial and ethnic composition ===
Norwalk, Connecticut – Racial and ethnic composition Note: the US Census treats Hispanic/Latino as an ethnic category. This table excludes Latinos from the racial categories and assigns them to a separate category. Hispanics/Latinos may be of any race.
Race / Ethnicity (NH = Non-Hispanic)	Pop 2000	Pop 2010	Pop 2020	% 2000	% 2010	% 2020
White alone (NH)	53,324	47,718	44,314	64.28%	55.74%	48.60%
Black or African American alone (NH)	12,231	11,472	11,074	14.74%	13.40%	12.14%
Native American or Alaska Native alone (NH)	95	94	102	0.11%	0.11%	0.11%
Asian alone (NH)	2,672	4,045	4,772	3.22%	4.73%	5.23%
Pacific Islander alone (NH)	28	25	14	0.03%	0.03%	0.02%
Some Other Race alone (NH)	137	244	652	0.17%	0.29%	0.72%
Mixed Race or Multi-Racial (NH)	1,498	1,235	2,627	1.81%	1.44%	2.88%
Hispanic or Latino (any race)	12,966	20,770	27,629	15.63%	24.26%	30.30%
Total	82,951	85,603	91,184	100.00%	100.00%	100.00%

=== 2020 census ===
As of the 2020 census, Norwalk had a population of 91,184. The median age was 39.5 years. 20.3% of residents were under the age of 18 and 16.0% of residents were 65 years of age or older. For every 100 females there were 94.9 males, and for every 100 females age 18 and over there were 92.6 males age 18 and over.

100.0% of residents lived in urban areas, while 0.0% lived in rural areas.

There were 36,078 households in Norwalk, of which 29.2% had children under the age of 18 living in them. Of all households, 43.5% were married-couple households, 18.7% were households with a male householder and no spouse or partner present, and 30.5% were households with a female householder and no spouse or partner present. About 29.6% of all households were made up of individuals and 11.0% had someone living alone who was 65 years of age or older.

There were 38,152 housing units, of which 5.4% were vacant. The homeowner vacancy rate was 1.1% and the rental vacancy rate was 5.7%.

Racial composition as of the 2020 census
Race	Number	Percent
White	48,225	52.9%
Black or African American	11,659	12.8%
American Indian and Alaska Native	660	0.7%
Asian	4,830	5.3%
Native Hawaiian and Other Pacific Islander	18	0.0%
Some other race	14,350	15.7%
Two or more races	11,442	12.5%
Hispanic or Latino (of any race)	27,629	30.3%

=== 2010 census ===
As of the census of 2010, 85,603 people, 35,415 households, and 21,630 families resided in the city. The population density was 2,358.2 inhabitants per square mile (910.5/km^{2}). The 35,415 housing units had an average density of 975.6 per square mile (376.7/km^{2}). The racial makeup of the city was 68.7% White, 14.2% African American, 0.4% Native American, 4.8% Asian, 9.1% from other races, and 2.8% from two or more races. Hispanics or Latinos of any race were 24.3% of the population.

Of the 35,415 households, 27.9% had children under 18 living with them, 47.1% were married couples living together, 11.0% had a female householder with no husband present, and 38.4% were not families. About 33.0% of all households were made up of individuals, and 8.5% had someone living alone who was 65 or older. The average household size in the city was 2.55, and the average family size was 3.16.

The age distribution was 22% under 18, with 7.3% from 18 to 24, 31.7% from 25 to 44, 31.2% from 45 to 64, and 12.8% were 65 or older. The median age was 40 years. For every 100 females, there were 96.2 males.

The median income for a household in the city was $76,161, and for a family was $103,032. The per capita income for the city was $43,303. About 5.7% of families and 8.4% of the population were below the poverty line, including 10.2% of those under age 18 and 8.2% of those age 65 or over.

== Economy ==
Booking Holdings, Datto, FactSet, Pepperidge Farm, Priceline.com, Terex, Ventus, and Xerox have headquarters in Norwalk. The Financial Accounting Foundation and the Financial Accounting Standards Board are also based in Norwalk.

== Arts and culture ==
=== Attractions ===
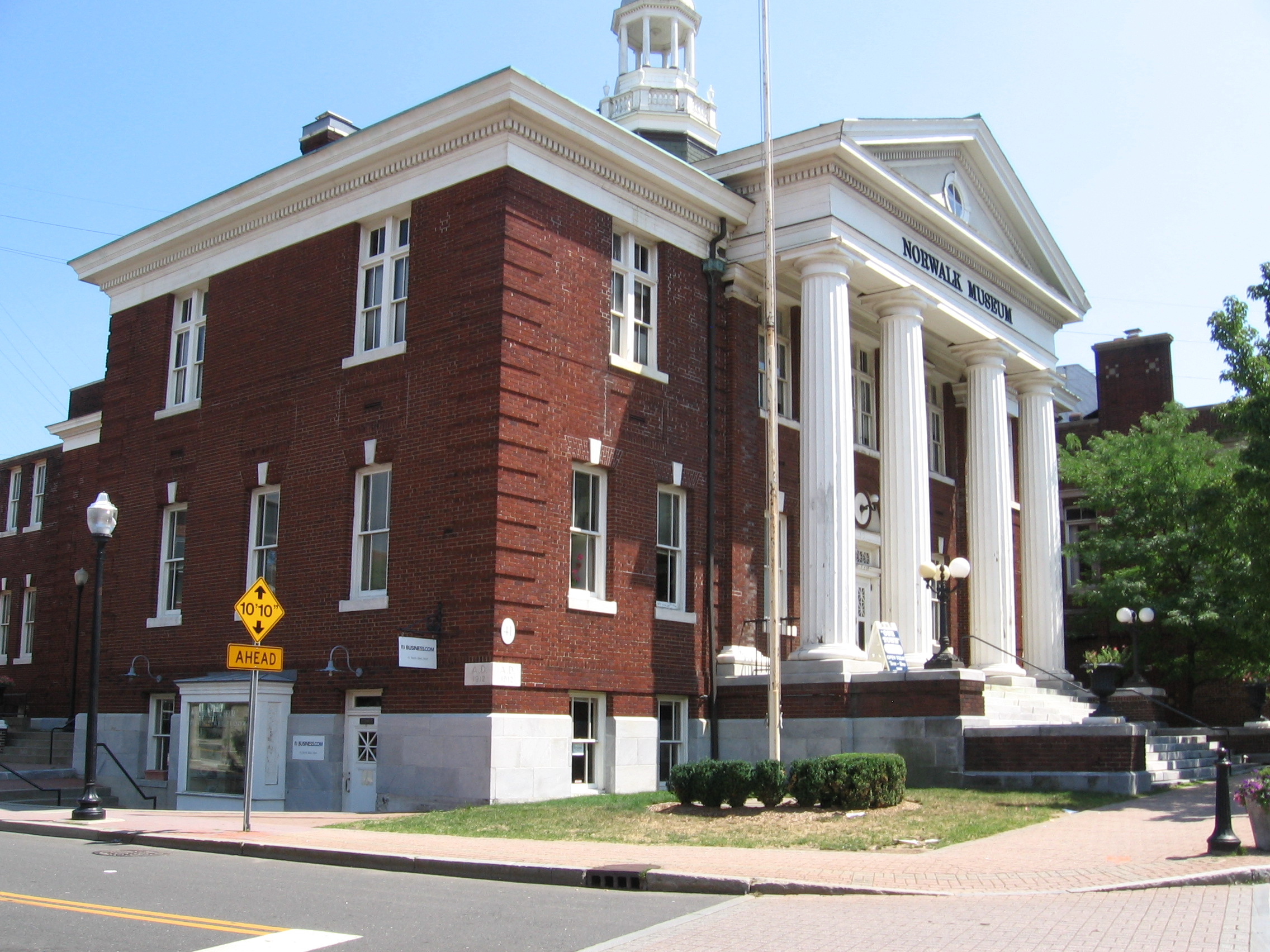
Norwalk's former city hall

- Norwalk Oyster Festival
- Norwalk Boat Show
- Lockwood-Mathews Mansion Museum
- Manresa Island Park (planned)
- Maritime Aquarium at Norwalk
- The Mill Hill Historic Park and Museum
- Norwalk Film Festival
- Norwalk Historical Society Museum
- Norwalk Islands
- Norwalk Symphony Orchestra
- Norwalk Youth Symphony
- Sheffield Island Light (house)
- SoNo Switchtower Museum
- Stepping Stones Museum for Children
- National Havoc Robot League

=== Notable sites on the National Register of Historic Places ===
- Norwalk Green Historic District
- Joseph Loth Company Building
- Lockwood-Mathews Mansion
- Rock Ledge
- Norwalk's Former City Hall
- Sheffield Island Light
- Peck Ledge Lighthouse
- Greens Ledge Light
- Beth Israel Synagogue
- Village Creek
- White Barn Theatre

== Government ==
=== Politics ===
Norwalk has voted Democratic for president since 1992, when the city voted for Bill Clinton. However, between 1928 and 1992, the city only voted Democratic twice: 1936 and 1964.

Norwalk city vote by party in presidential elections
Year	Democratic	Republican	Third parties
2024	63.59% 26,526	34.97% 14,586	1.44% 602
2020	67.99% 29,382	30.80% 13,311	1.21% 521
2016	63.86% 24,414	32.23% 12,324	3.91% 1,494
2012	63.01% 22,369	35.98% 12,773	1.01% 357
2008	65.51% 24,489	33.84% 12,651	0.65% 244
2004	58.15% 20,615	40.06% 14,201	1.79% 633
2000	59.90% 19,293	35.76% 11,519	4.34% 1,399
1996	55.52% 17,354	34.55% 10,800	9.93% 3,105
1992	44.02% 16,488	39.36% 14,743	16.62% 6,224
1988	43.23% 14,518	55.44% 18,618	1.33% 445
1984	35.68% 12,509	64.03% 22,447	0.29% 102
1980	36.40% 11,785	52.40% 16,969	11.20% 3,627
1976	42.69% 13,724	56.53% 18,176	0.78% 250
1972	34.17% 11,459	64.10% 21,496	1.73% 579
1968	41.59% 13,330	51.50% 16,503	6.91% 2,215
1964	61.90% 19,620	38.10% 12,076	0.00% 0
1960	44.32% 13,744	55.68% 17,268	0.00% 0
1956	28.48% 8,134	71.52% 20,428	0.00% 0
1952	43.47% 10,280	61.52% 17,031	1.34% 372
1948	37.13% 9,980	52.41% 12,032	4.12% 947
1944	46.88% 9,822	53.12% 11,131	0.00% 0
1940	49.29% 9,869	50.71% 10,153	0.00% 0
1936	56.17% 9,216	43.83% 7,191	0.00% 0
1932	46.40% 6,375	53.60% 7,364	0.00% 0
1928	37.95% 4,867	61.32% 7,865	0.73% 94

Voter Registration and Party Enrollment Statistics as of October 27, 2020
Party	Active voters	Inactive voters	Total voters	Percentage
Republican	10,161	52	10,213	17.22%
Democratic	23,144	164	23,308	39.30%
Libertarian	1,226	10	1,236	2.08%
Unaffiliated	24,367	171	24,538	41.38%
Totals	58,898	397	59,295	100%

=== Districts ===
Norwalk has six taxing districts. The First, Second, Third, and Sixth taxing districts are political entities with their respective voters electing officers, holding annual business meetings, approving budgets, and considering other matters, as specified in each of their charters. Election of Taxing District Commissioners and Treasurers by voters from the 1st, 2nd, 3rd, and 6th districts take place in odd-numbered years. The Fourth and Fifth districts are not counted as separate governments, as they constitute the city proper. Each taxing district has its own property tax rate reflecting the mix of services each receives from the city.

=== Municipal representation ===
Municipal elections of mayor, common council, board of education, and other positions are held on odd-numbered years at 13 polling places within five voting districts around the city. Voting districts are not the same for state and federal elections, which are held on even-numbered years at 12 polling locations.

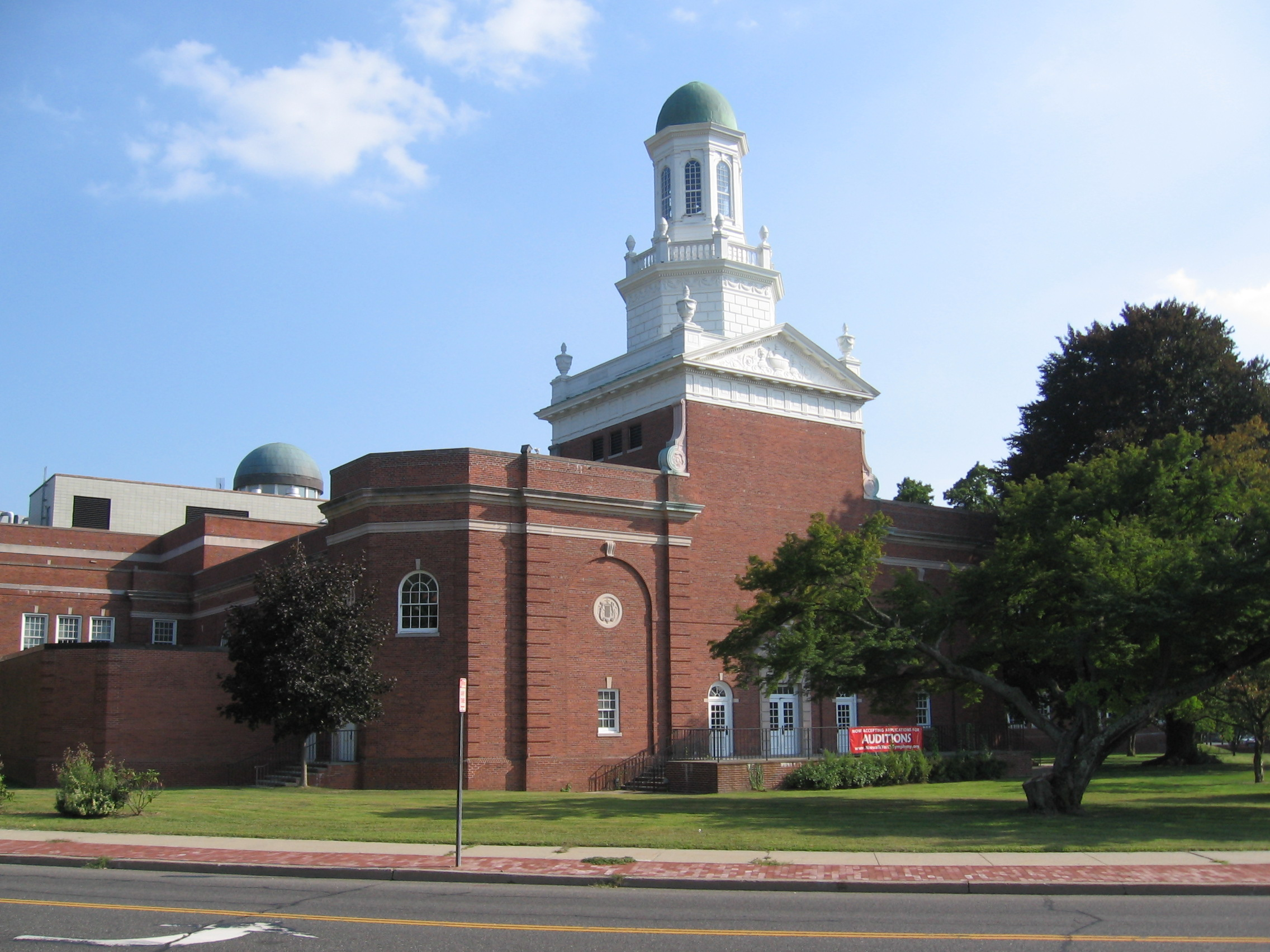
Norwalk City Hall and Concert Hall

Norwalk's municipal government is a Mayor-Council of a mayor-council government with the mayor of Norwalk elected by its voters. The city's charter gives certain administrative powers exclusively to the council and others jointly to the Council and Mayor. The Common Council is the law-writing body of the City of Norwalk. Norwalk's common council consists of fifteen council members, five elected at-large and ten elected by district, two from each district.

=== State and federal representation ===
==== Connecticut General Assembly ====
Norwalk is represented in the Connecticut General Assembly by five House representatives corresponding to five Connecticut legislative districts and one senator from one Connecticut Senate district.

Connecticut State Senate
District	Name	Assumed office	Party affiliation
25	Bob Duff	2001	Democratic

Connecticut House of Representatives
District	Name	Assumed office	Party affiliation
137	Kadeem Roberts	2023	Democratic
140	Travis Simms	2018	Democratic
141	Tracy Marra	2023	Republican
142	Lucy Dathan	2018	Democratic
143	Dominique Johnson	2023	Democratic

==== United States Congress ====
Norwalk lies within Connecticut's 4th congressional district and is represented by Democrat Jim Himes in the United States House of Representatives. It is represented by Democrats Richard Blumenthal and Chris Murphy in the United States Senate.

== Education ==
Norwalk Public Schools operates public schools, while the community also has various private schools.

Norwalk was granted a town charter by the Connecticut General Court in 1651. On May 29, 1678, town records mention the establishment of community-supported teaching activities with a passage that reads:

"'At a town meeting... voted and agreed to hier a scole master to teach all the children in ye town to lerne to Rede and write; and that Mr. Cornish shall be hierd for that service and the townsmen are to hier him upon as reasonable terms as they can."

The school that was established in the 1670s was located near the Ludlow Square area of East Norwalk (near the former Roger Ludlow Junior High School).

== Sports ==
Baseball and softball are popular amateur sports with active leagues across many age groups in Norwalk. Four baseball fields and 16 Little League fields are in the city. Several of the fields, including Calf Pasture Beach, are illuminated for nighttime play. The fields at the Norwalk Little League team won the Little League World Series in 1952. The 14-year-old Babe Ruth League team won the championship in 2008. The Norwalk Biddy Basketball All-Star team Won the state and regional titles and then went on to the world championships in New Orleans, Louisiana, in 1986 and placed seventh in the world.

Being a coastal city, Norwalk is home to a great many water sports, including competitive swimming, recreational boating and fishing, sailing, windsurfing, and kayaking. The Norwalk River and inner Norwalk Harbor host rowing events and organizations. Norwalk resident Daniel Walsh won a bronze medal in Beijing with the U.S. Olympic rowing team in the 2008 Summer Olympics.

Three golf courses are in the city of Norwalk: Shorehaven Golf Club is a private club in East Norwalk, the Silvermine Golf Club is a private club in Silvermine (part of the course lies in the town of Wilton), and the Oak Hills Park golf course is a public course in West Norwalk.

The cross-town rivalry between the city's two largest high schools, Norwalk High School and Brien McMahon High School, is fierce, particularly for the football, basketball, soccer, and field hockey teams in the fall, as well as lacrosse, baseball, and softball teams in the spring. Brien McMahon High School's football team won the Fairfield County Interscholastic Athletic Conference and Class M State Football championship in 1994. McMahon High School's boys' lacrosse team won the state division 2 lacrosse championship in 2000.

== Media ==
News sources in Norwalk include News 12 Connecticut, a regional news channel for southwestern Connecticut and based in Norwalk. The Hour was an independent daily newspaper based in Norwalk and founded in 1871, which was purchased by Hearst Communications on April 12, 2016. NancyonNorwalk.com is a self-published, nonprofit news site founded in 2010 that covers local issues.

== Transportation ==
=== Highways ===
Interstate 95 and the Merritt Parkway lead through Norwalk, with several exits within the Norwalk city limits, and are the major thoroughfare through the city. U.S. Route 1 goes through the center of the city, mostly following local streets. The major north–south corridor in Norwalk is U.S. Route 7, which is an expressway throughout most of the route in the city. The expressway section ends at Grist Mill Road in Norwalk from where Route 7 resumes northbound along Main Avenue. Other state routes include Routes 53, 123, and 136.

=== Buses ===
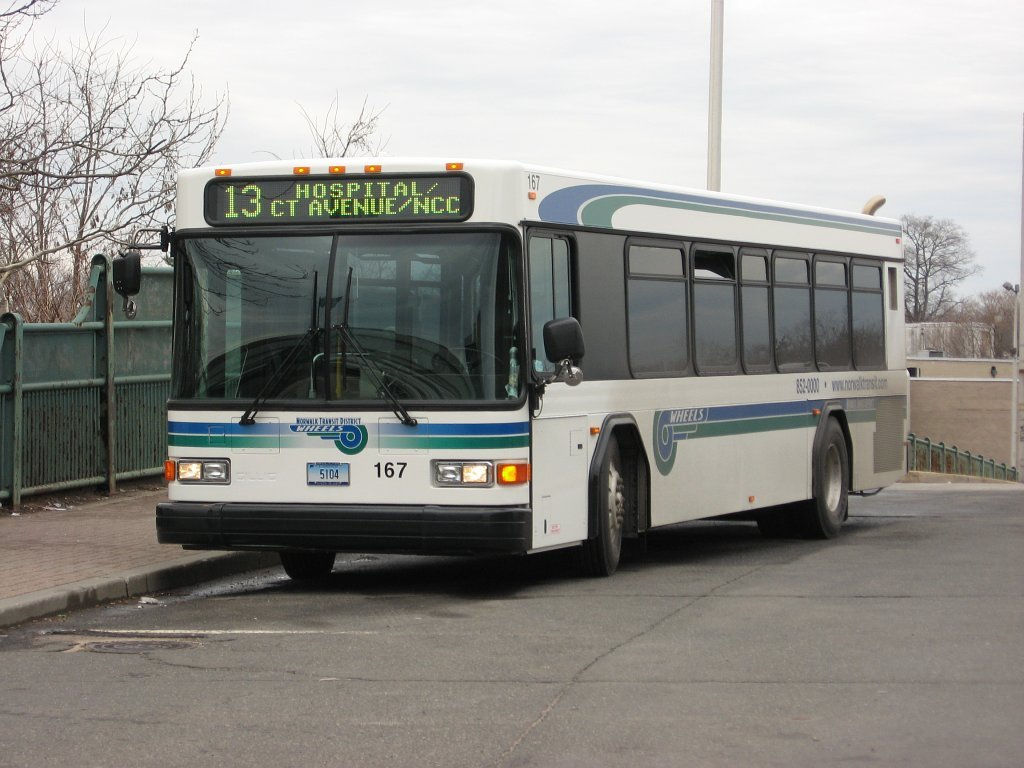
A Wheels bus at Wheels hub

Public transport bus service within Norwalk is provided by Norwalk Transit District. Norwalk Transit District operates fixed-route public bus service in Norwalk and Westport with evening and Sunday shuttles (serving South Norwalk, Main Avenue, and Connecticut Avenue) and commuter shuttles. Access to other cities through bus services Milford, Danbury, and Stamford. All fixed-route buses meet at the Transportation Hub.

=== Railroad ===
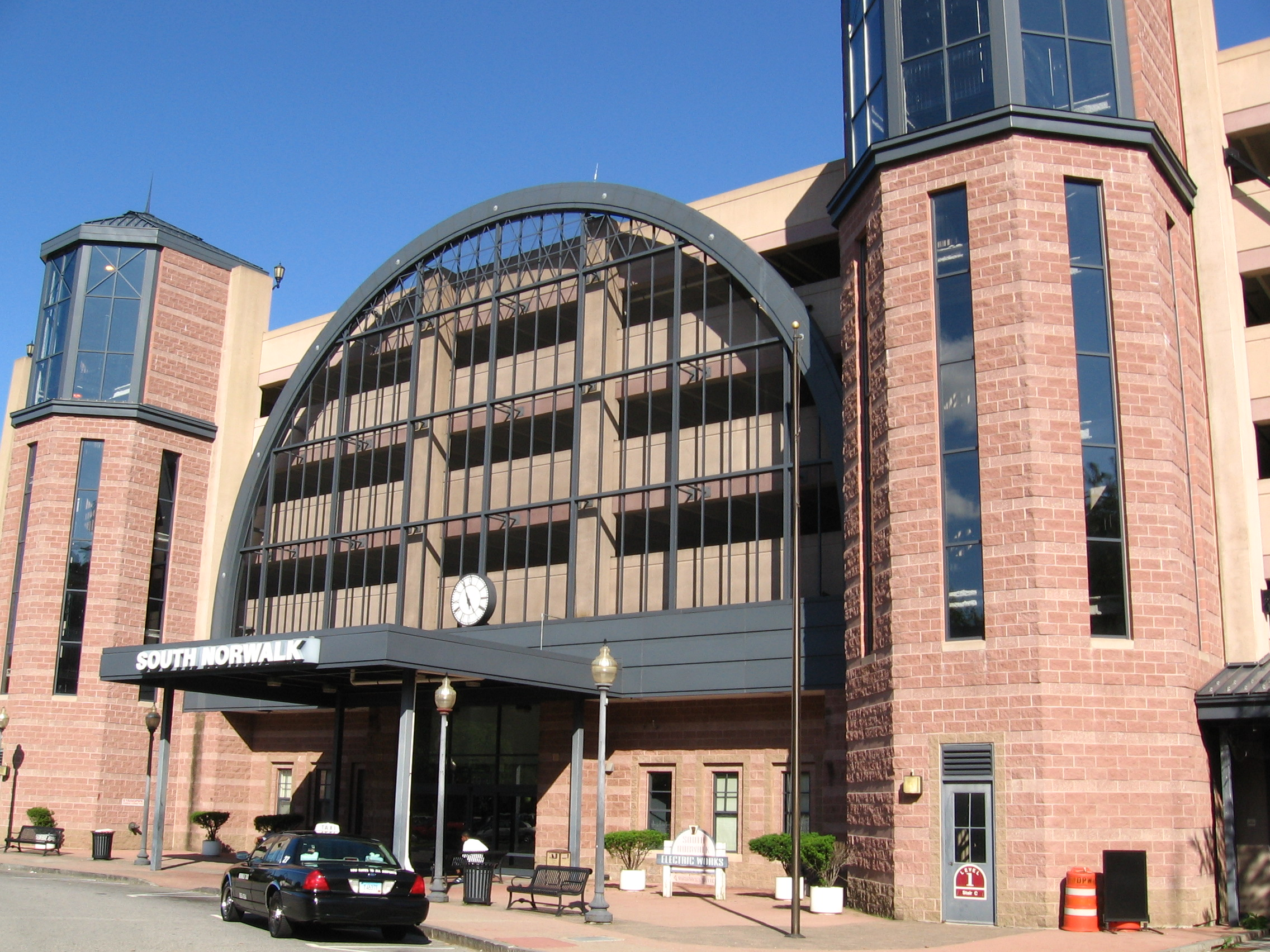
West entrance of the South Norwalk train station

The Metro-North Railroad's New Haven Line runs through and stops in Norwalk. The train goes west and east, with Grand Central Terminal and New Haven Union Station being the final stops. The Danbury Branch runs from South Norwalk to Danbury, CT. Four stations are in Norwalk, three of them on the main line which is: Rowayton, South Norwalk and East Norwalk. The fourth station, Merritt 7, is on the Danbury Branch. Metro-North provides commuter service for all four stations.

The structure at 47 Wall Street was formerly the Wall Street station of the Danbury Branch, which operated from 1896 to 1936. The city's trolley system barn also operated on Wall Street.

=== Airports ===
Norwalk is within reasonable distance of 11 airports – four general aviation, three regional, and four international.

General aviation airports	Distance from downtown/location
Sikorsky Memorial Airport	15 miles east in Stratford, Connecticut
Danbury Municipal Airport	18 miles north in Danbury, Connecticut
Waterbury–Oxford Airport	29 miles northeast in Oxford, Connecticut
Teterboro Airport	38 miles southwest in Teterboro, New Jersey

Regional airports	Distance from downtown/location
Westchester County Airport	16 miles west in Westchester County, New York
Tweed New Haven Airport	29 miles east in East Haven, Connecticut

International airports	Distance from downtown/location
LaGuardia Airport	34 miles southwest in Queens, New York
John F. Kennedy International Airport	38 miles southwest in Queens, New York
Stewart International Airport	45 miles northwest in Newburgh, New York
Newark Liberty International Airport	50 miles southwest in Newark, New Jersey
Bradley International Airport	68 miles northeast in Windsor Locks, Connecticut

== Infrastructure ==
=== Utilities ===
Electric power and natural gas in most of Norwalk are provided by Eversource Energy.

- The First Taxing District provides water to the Third, Fourth and Fifth Taxing Districts.

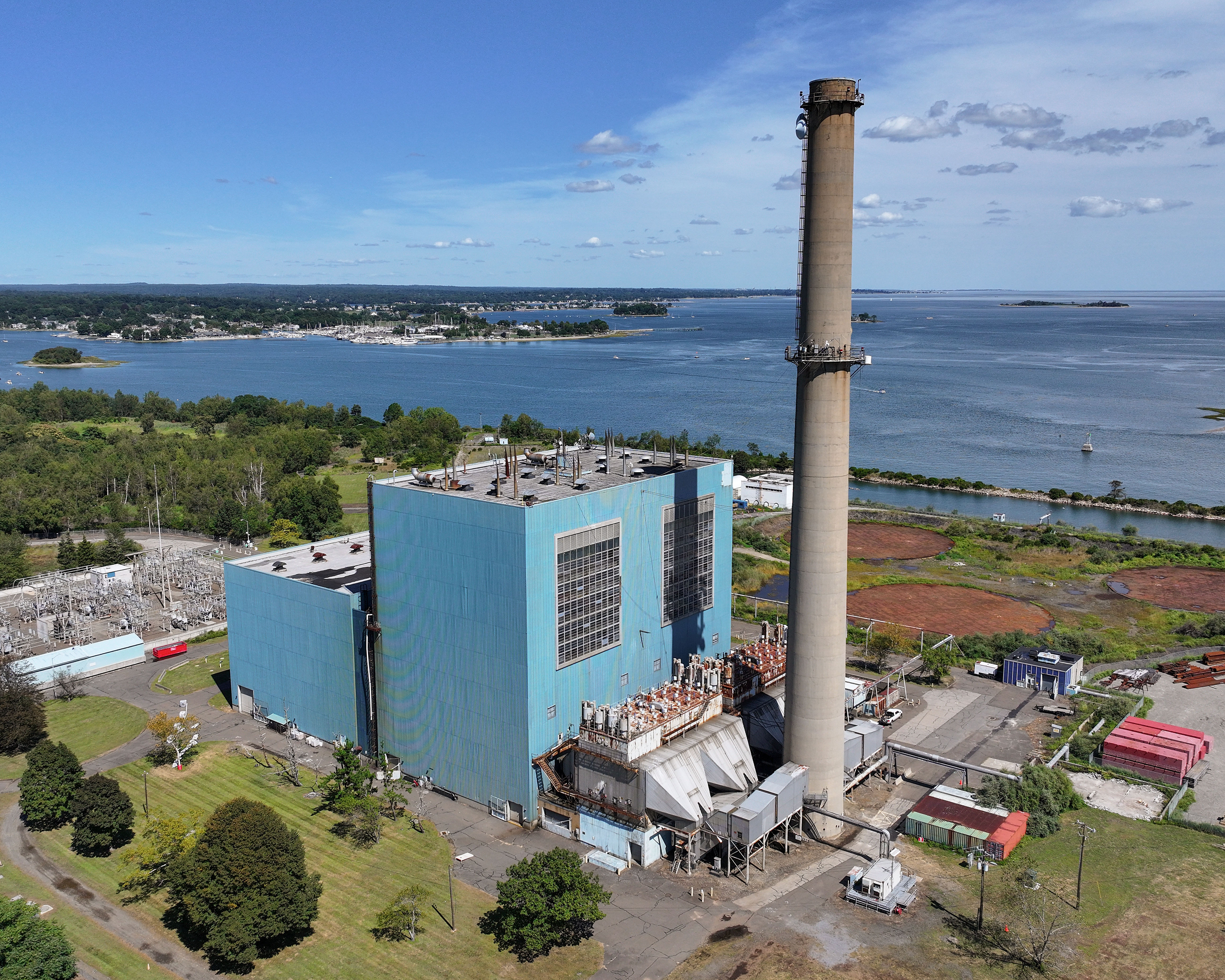
The now-abandoned Harbor Generating Station on Manresa Island

- The Second Taxing District serves sections of South Norwalk, East Norwalk, West Norwalk, Rowayton and Silvermine. and also owns and operates South Norwalk Electric and Water.
- The Third Taxing District provides electric power for East Norwalk.

The districts purchase wholesale power and arrange for its delivery to, and distribution within, their respective districts. Power lines and meters in East Norwalk, South Norwalk, and parts of Rowayton are maintained by the districts. Both the second (SNEW) and third (TTD) district electric departments belong to the six member Connecticut Municipal Electric Energy Cooperative which pools their wholesale power purchasing to obtain lower rates for their customers.

Connecticut Light and Power (now Eversource Energy) operated a power plant, Norwalk Harbor Station on Manresa Island, from 1960 to 1999 when it was acquired by NRG Energy, which then began its deactivation in 2013.

In 2004 the Third Taxing District installed three diesel powered generators at the Norden complex on Norden Place that were initially licensed only for emergency power supply. By summer 2008 the generators, with a combined capacity of 6 Megawatts, had been upgraded to allow licensed operation as regular power providers for the grid (not just emergency power).

In 2007 and 2008 the construction of the Middletown-Norwalk transmission line disrupted traffic along the Boston Post Road, but the completion of the line was hoped to help provide additional power to lower Fairfield County. In addition, a high-voltage undersea line runs from Manresa Island to Long Island to help provide electric power to Long Island Power Authority customers. In 2008, the city government of Norwalk started initial investigations of whether the city might resume generating power for sale to electricity customers in the city. The plant was permanently closed in 2013 and the site began remediation and transformation in 2025 as part of the Manresa Island Park project.

=== Emergency services ===
Norwalk Police Department serves as the city's police department, and Norwalk Fire Department serves Norwalk's fire protection district. Norwalk is served 24/7 by Norwalk Hospital and Norwalk Hospital EMS, a 911 paramedic service. The service consists of hospital-based paramedics and EMT-Is who serve Norwalk as well as New Canaan, Wilton, Weston, and Westport.

== In popular culture ==
- In J. D. Salinger's novel The Catcher in the Rye, Holden Caulfield's parents are attending a party in Norwalk the night he sneaks into his apartment to visit his sister, Phoebe.
- In Jonathan Franzen's novel The Corrections, Chip Lambert holds a "twelve-hour vigil" at a donut shop in Norwalk (stalking Melissa Paquette in neighboring Westport).

=== Films ===
Full-length features and documentary films, filmed or set in Norwalk:

- Hope Springs (2012)
- Confessions of a Shopaholic (2009)—filmed along Washington Street in South Norwalk.
- Birds of America (2008)
- College Road Trip (2008)—scenes filmed in town in mid-July 2007; shooting locations were the former Norwalk police headquarters building in Matthews Park, on the Merritt Parkway and along the Route 7 connector.
- Revolutionary Road (2008)
- The Six Wives of Henry LeFay (2008)—filmed in 2007 on Wall Street in Norwalk Center.
- The Life Before Her Eyes (2007)—Uma Thurman filmed a scene at Norwalk Community College in August 2006.
- Satan's Little Helper (2004)
- The Stepford Wives (2004)
- The Object of My Affection (1998)
- The Stepford Wives (1975)

=== Television ===
Partially or entirely recorded in Norwalk:

- Oprah Winfrey Presents: Mitch Albom's For One More Day
- House of Dark Shadows (1970 series) — "Abandoned Monastery" portions filmed at the Lockwood-Mathews Mansion.

== Sister cities ==
- Nagarote, Nicaragua (1986) (see Norwalk/Nagarote Sister City Project)
- Riobamba, Ecuador (2018)
