= South Wilton, Connecticut =

Census-designated place in Connecticut, United States

- Census-designated place
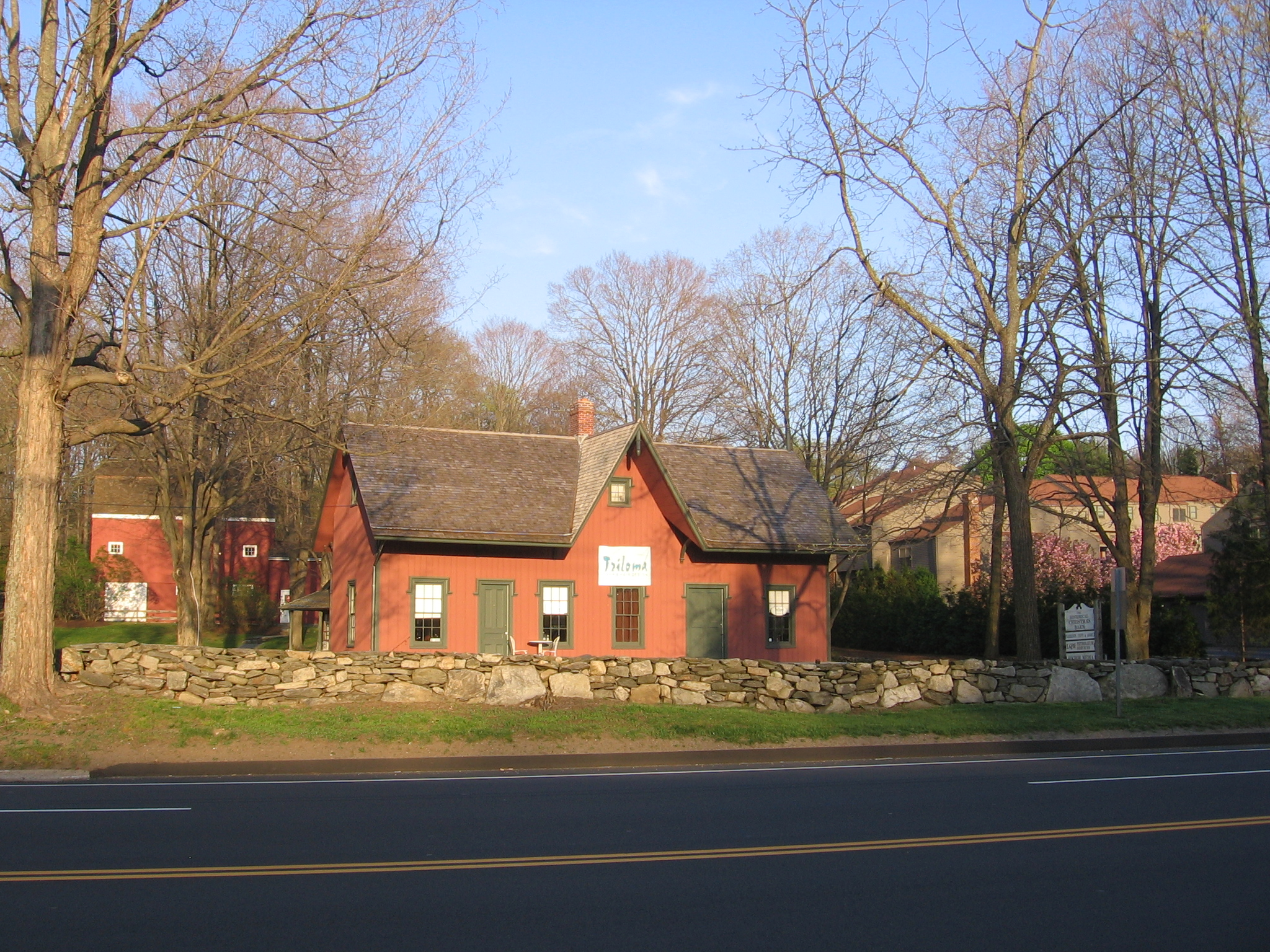
- Relocated Wilton Station in South Wilton

- Location within Connecticut Location within the United States
- Coordinates: 41°10′12″N 73°24′58″W
- Country: United States
- State: Connecticut
- County: Fairfield
- Town: Wilton

Area
  - Total: 1.15 sq mi (2.97 km^{2})
  - Land: 1.12 sq mi (2.90 km^{2})
  - Water: 0.027 sq mi (0.07 km^{2})
- Elevation: 140 ft (43 m)
- Time zone: UTC-5 (Eastern (EST))
  - Summer (DST): UTC-4 (EDT)
- ZIP Code: 06897 (South Wilton)
- Area codes: 203/475
- FIPS code: 09-71215
- GNIS feature ID: 2805969

South Wilton is a census-designated place (CDP) in the town of Wilton, Connecticut, United States. It is in the southern part of the town along U.S. Route 7, in the valley of the Norwalk River. The CDP is bordered to the north by Wilton Center and to the south by the city of Norwalk.

As of the 2020 census, South Wilton had a population of 1,447.

South Wilton was first listed as a CDP prior to the 2020 census.

== Demographics ==
=== 2020 census ===
As of the 2020 census, South Wilton had a population of 1,447. The median age was 45.3 years. 27.1% of residents were under the age of 18 and 20.9% of residents were 65 years of age or older. For every 100 females there were 87.0 males, and for every 100 females age 18 and over there were 77.9 males age 18 and over.

100.0% of residents lived in urban areas, while 0.0% lived in rural areas.

There were 601 households in South Wilton, of which 45.6% had children under the age of 18 living in them. Of all households, 54.4% were married-couple households, 11.5% were households with a male householder and no spouse or partner present, and 31.8% were households with a female householder and no spouse or partner present. About 26.1% of all households were made up of individuals and 18.1% had someone living alone who was 65 years of age or older.

There were 632 housing units, of which 4.9% were vacant. The homeowner vacancy rate was 0.7% and the rental vacancy rate was 6.4%.

Racial composition as of the 2020 census
Race	Number	Percent
White	1,084	74.9%
Black or African American	22	1.5%
American Indian and Alaska Native	1	0.1%
Asian	229	15.8%
Native Hawaiian and Other Pacific Islander	0	0.0%
Some other race	29	2.0%
Two or more races	82	5.7%
Hispanic or Latino (of any race)	68	4.7%
