= Charles E. Pont =

American painter

Charles Ernest Pont (6 January 1898 – 28 July 1971) was an American artist and Baptist minister. Although his ministerial career was not particularly noteworthy, he was a prolific artist in many media including watercolor, printmaking, oil, pen and ink, and pencil. His framed art not only hangs in hundreds of private and public collections, but can also be found in many realms of graphic design, including book and magazine illustration, greeting cards, sign painting and calligraphy, murals, typographic design, and decorative papers. While his style evolved with the times in which he lived, and was particularly influenced by modernism in the 1930s, he is best known for the fine precision of his prints and the realism of his watercolors.

== Early life ==
Charles Pont was born in Saint-Julien-en-Genevois, France, on 6 January 1898 to a Swiss mother and an unknown father. His mother abandoned him in New York City when he was three months old, and he was raised there by a German immigrant couple who had no other children. Informed of his adoption at age seventeen, Charles reverted to the name on his birth certificate, which included his natural mother's unmarried family name of Pont. Entering the work force at age fifteen in 1913, Pont quickly transitioned through twenty clerical and manual labor jobs by 1925. He registered for the draft in 1917, but a serious illness incapacitated him until the end of the First World War.

== Christian ministry ==
Given six months to live in 1918, Pont became a born-again Christian and eventually considered the ministry his life-calling. He frequently combined his artistic training with his ministry, giving many illustrated talks. The American Artists Group referred to him as "America's only artist-cleric". While still studying for ordination, Pont was appointed in 1939 to his first pastorate at Gilbert Memorial Church (now Georgetown Bible Church) in Georgetown, Connecticut. During this period he was also director (1940–1942) of the Old Fashioned New England Bible Hour, a radio program broadcast from Norwalk, Connecticut. Receiving his pastoral training at Eastern Baptist Theological Seminary (now Palmer Theological Seminary) in Pennsylvania, and Shelton College in New York City, he was ordained by the South Brooklyn Baptist Church in 1943, and moved later that year to become pastor of First Baptist Church of New Durham in North Bergen, New Jersey. Resigning that position in late 1944, he became for several years an itinerant preacher in the Eastern and Midwestern States. Unable to adequately support his family in that ministry, he returned to secular work about 1950, but remained available for the rest of his life as a guest and substitute speaker in numerous churches in Connecticut, New York and New Jersey. In the course of his ministry, Pont published two books, The Tabernacle Alphabet (Loizeaux Brothers, 1946), which he also illustrated, and The World's Collision (W.A. Wilde Co., 1956).

== Art career ==
Pont's artistic talent was already evident during secondary school, and he pursued a professional formation at Pratt Institute in Brooklyn and The Cooper Union in Manhattan. In 1933 he received a scholarship to continue his training with the American Artists League. His professional career began in 1925 as a carpenter and cabinet-maker in New York. Although he gave up this business in 1932, he never forgot these skills, and twenty years later designed and built his own home in Wilton, Connecticut.

In the midst of the Great Depression, Charles Pont turned to the fine arts as a full-time career, working chiefly as a book and magazine illustrator. Pursuing a nautical interest inherited from his adoptive father who had served in the German Imperial Navy, Pont became renowned as a maritime artist, painting covers for magazines such as Motor Boating, Yachting and Power Boating, as well as illustrating numerous marine books by authors such as Alan Villiers. He also illustrated numerous children's books by Joseph Leeming, Irving Simon, John Hooper and others, and Christian literature by such authors as Harry A. Ironside. From 1938 to 1941, he was paid by the federal Works Progress Administration to produce public art, and completed twenty-eight murals among other projects. During the 1930s he also turned to printmaking, receiving honors in wood engraving, lithography and etching.

While pursuing a second career as an itinerant preacher in the 1940s, Pont painted not only Biblical themes, but also landscapes in thirty states, as well as Canada and several European countries. Working with equal skill in oil, watercolor, ink, and printmaking, most of Pont's work remained nautical. In retired life he devoted himself to capturing the charm of the New England coast before all the 19th century sail lofts, docks and buildings were demolished. Giving up the ministry as a full-time occupation in the late 1940s, Pont turned again to commercial art for a living, and served as assistant art director for the New York publisher Grosset & Dunlap from 1954 until his retirement in 1963. Later, Pont taught art for Darien High School evening classes, and the Famous Artists School in Westport, both in Connecticut.

Pont's art was exhibited in his lifetime in practically every state as well as the 1939 New York World's Fair. His work in permanent public collections includes the Library of Congress, Smithsonian Institution, and Navy Department in Washington DC, the Metropolitan Museum of Art and New York Public Library in New York City, the Syracuse Museum, the Rochester Institute of Technology, and the Wilton, Connecticut, Town Hall, among many others.

Pont's professional associations included the American Artists Professional League, Southern Printmakers Society, American Water Color Society, New York Water Color Society, American Institute of Graphic Arts, and The Typophiles.

== Personal life ==
Pont was married in New York on 2 January 1925 to Dorothea Ford, one of five daughters of Irish immigrants. His only child, Joan Dorothea, was born 14 October 1927. At age fifty-two in 1950, Pont was reunited for the first time with his natural mother, Françoise Fournier-Pont (1872–1963). Charles Pont lived most of his life in New York City, moving in 1958 to the house he had built in Wilton, Connecticut. He died at home on 28 July 1971 aged seventy-three. His wife died in the same house in 1988, as did his daughter in 2006. Pont is survived by one grandchild and two great-grandchildren.
