= Wilton Center, Connecticut =

Census-designated place in Connecticut, United States

Coordinates: 41°11′25″N 73°25′55″W

- Census-designated place
- Location in Fairfield County and the state of Connecticut
- Country: United States
- State: Connecticut
- County: Fairfield
- Town: Wilton

Area
  - Total: 0.276 sq mi (0.71 km^{2})
  - Land: 0.276 sq mi (0.71 km^{2})
  - Water: 0.000 sq mi (0 km^{2})

Population (2010)
  - Total: 732
  - Density: 2,650/sq mi (1,020/km^{2})
- Time zone: UTC-5:00 (Eastern)
  - Summer (DST): UTC-4:00 (Eastern)
- Area code: 203
- FIPS code: 09-86380
- GNIS feature ID: 2631222

Wilton Center is a neighborhood/section and census-designated place (CDP) in the town of Wilton, Connecticut, United States. As of the 2020 census, Wilton Center had a population of 1,466. The CDP partially overlaps the Wilton Center Historic District.

== Geography ==
The CDP extends from Ridgefield Road (Connecticut Route 33) in the north to Wolfpit Road Connecticut Route 106 in the south, and is bordered to the east by the Metro-North Railroad Danbury Branch line. The western edge of the CDP is an irregular line about 0.3 miles (0.48 km) west of the Metro-North line. The historic district is largely along Ridgefield Road at the north end of the CDP. The Norwalk River flows from north to south through the eastern side of the CDP.

According to the United States Census Bureau, Wilton Center has a total area of 0.276 square miles (0.71 km^{2}), all land.

== Demographics ==
=== 2020 census ===
As of the 2020 census, Wilton Center had a population of 1,466. The median age was 48.1 years. 19.8% of residents were under the age of 18 and 25.1% of residents were 65 years of age or older. For every 100 females there were 83.0 males, and for every 100 females age 18 and over there were 79.9 males age 18 and over.

100.0% of residents lived in urban areas, while 0.0% lived in rural areas.

There were 703 households in Wilton Center, of which 29.0% had children under the age of 18 living in them. Of all households, 44.4% were married-couple households, 16.5% were households with a male householder and no spouse or partner present, and 36.3% were households with a female householder and no spouse or partner present. About 37.1% of all households were made up of individuals and 24.2% had someone living alone who was 65 years of age or older.

There were 737 housing units, of which 4.6% were vacant. The homeowner vacancy rate was 0.0% and the rental vacancy rate was 6.5%.

Racial composition as of the 2020 census
Race	Number	Percent
White	1,066	72.7%
Black or African American	37	2.5%
American Indian and Alaska Native	0	0.0%
Asian	199	13.6%
Native Hawaiian and Other Pacific Islander	0	0.0%
Some other race	45	3.1%
Two or more races	119	8.1%
Hispanic or Latino (of any race)	97	6.6%
