= Norwalk River Valley Trail =

- Length: 1.6 mi (2.6 km)
- Location: Norwalk, CT
- Trailheads: Union Street, Norwalk; Crescent Street, Norwalk (current section)
- Use: Hiking, biking, jogging, cross country skiing
- Difficulty: Easy and level (currently). Partially handicapped accessible
- Surface: Asphalt or wooded

The Norwalk River Valley Trail (NRVT) is a multi-use trail that is under construction. The plan for the trail is to run from Norwalk, Connecticut, to Danbury, Connecticut, stretching about 38 miles (61 km) passing through Wilton, Redding, and Ridgefield. The trail currently consists of a 1.6 miles (2.6 km) section in Norwalk with the trailheads at Matthews Park and New Canaan Avenue (Connecticut route 136). The trail generally follows the Norwalk River.

The trail is controlled by each respective town it passes through. Funding is provided primarily by the state, along with some private donations.

== Trail development ==
The idea for the Norwalk River Valley Trail aroused in 1995 to have a trail run along the Norwalk River. The trail will extend over 30 miles (48 km) from Calf Pasture Beach in Norwalk to Rogers Park in Danbury, passing through Wilton, Ridgefield, and Redding.
