= Eva L. Ogden =

American writer

- Born: February 17, 1853; New Canaan, Connecticut, U.S.
- Died: September 8, 1919 (aged 66); Goshen, New York, U.S.
- Other names: Eva L. Lambert
- Occupation(s): Poet, educator

Eva L. Ogden Lambert (February 17, 1853 – September 8, 1919) was an American writer and educator. Most of her published work was poetry for young readers, and texts for use in recitation.

== Biography ==
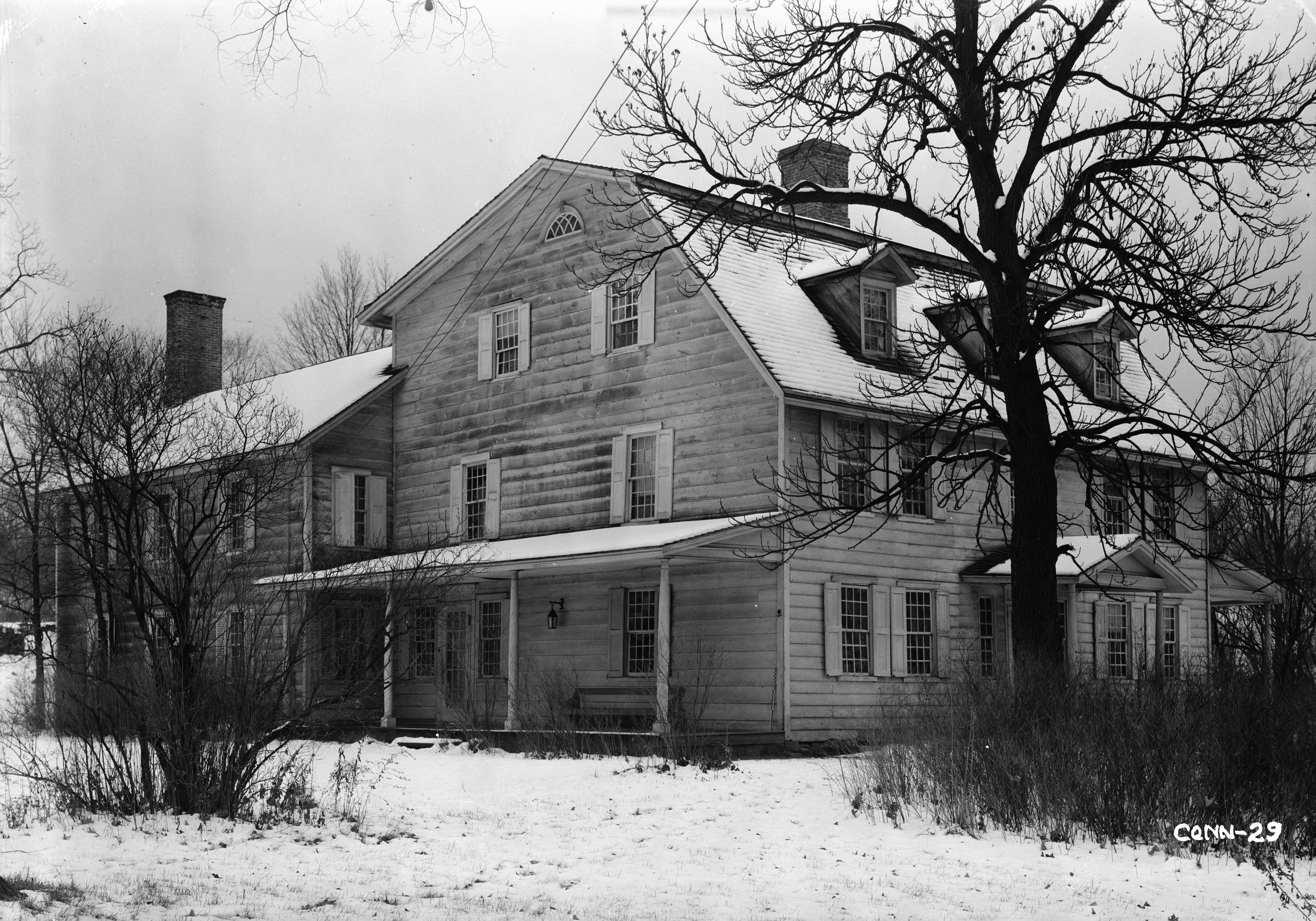
The David Lambert House, also known as Lilacstead, where Ogden lived and worked, she married in 1886. It is now owned by the Wilton Historical Society.

Ogden was born in New Canaan, Connecticut, the daughter of Sereno Edward Ogden and Sophia Phebe Botsford Ogden. In 1886, Ogden married educator David Samuel Rogers Lambert, and lived with him in the David Lambert House in Wilton. Together they ran the Wilton Academy, a boys' school, in the historic house.

Ogden's husband died in 1897; he was shot in their home, by burglars who also attacked her. One of the convicted killers was a former student at the Wilton Academy. In 1908, she gave a 25-pound fragment of an 18th-century statue of King George II to the Wilton, Connecticut, town clerk, Henry Chichester. She also gave her brother a 20-pound piece of the statue; that piece was donated to the Connecticut State Library in 1960.

Ogden died in 1919, at the age of 66, in Goshen, New York. Her grave is with her husband's, in Connecticut. The Lamberts had two children, David and Samuel; both sons died in infancy, but are mentioned by name on the couple's joint gravestone.

== Publications ==
Ogden's poems were published in magazines including St. Nicholas, Current Literature, The Youth's Companion, and Puck's Library. They were often anthologized, especially "The Sea" (1881), and recommended as good texts for recitation. "The Cold Storage Baby" (1902) is a science fiction story by Ogden about a living baby preserved for decades in a glass box.

All of the titles below are poems, unless otherwise noted.

- "The Miller of Dee" (1880)
- "Proud Prince Cham" (1881)
- "The Sea" (1881)
- "The Quest" (1882)
- "The Maid of Honor"(1882)
- "His Way" (1888)
- "A Christmas Legend" (1889)
- "Harder" (1893)
- "If" (1894)
- "In Lilac Time" (1896)
- "The Day After the Betrothal" (1899)
- "Mistress Sherwood's Victory" (1901, story)
- "The Cold Storage Baby" (1902, story)
- "Dame Quigley's Glass" (1903)
- "Mary's Meadowing" (1904)
- "A Night Before Christmas" (1907)
- "My World" (1907)
- "The Legend of Piddinghoe" (1909)
