= David Lambert House =

Historic house in Connecticut, United States

- U.S. National Register of Historic Places
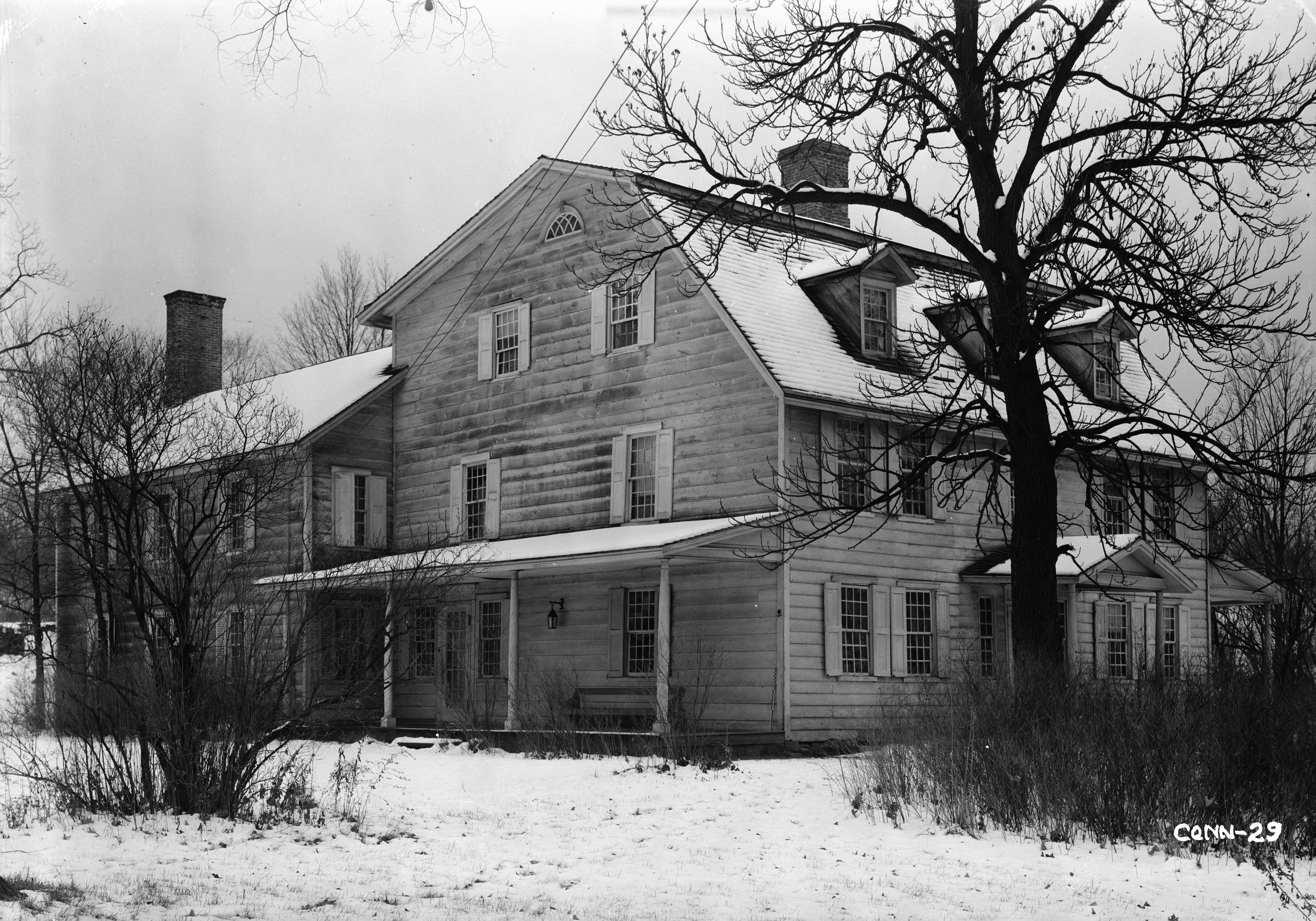

- Location within Connecticut Location within the United States
- Location: 150 Danbury Road, Wilton, Connecticut
- Coordinates: 41°10′50″N 73°25′18″W
- Area: 1 acre (0.40 ha)
- Built: c. 1726
- Architectural style: Colonial Revival, Colonial, Federal
- NRHP reference No.: 92000908
- Added to NRHP: July 24, 1992

The David Lambert House is a historic house museum at 150 Danbury Road in Wilton, Connecticut. Built about 1726 by one of the town's early settlers, it is a well-preserved colonial-era house with later Federal and Colonial Revival alterations. It is now owned by the local historical society. It was listed on the National Register of Historic Places in 1992.

== Description and history ==
The David Lambert House stands in Southern Wilton, on the East Side of Danbury Road (Connecticut Route 7) just south of its Junction with Westport Road (Connecticut Route 33). It is a 2 1/2-story wood-frame structure, five bays wide, with a clapboarded exterior and a large central chimney. Its roof is asymmetrical, with a gambreled front and a shallow sloping rear. The steep front slope is pierced by three gabled dormers. The main facade is five bays wide, with sash windows arranged around the central entrance. The entrance has Federal period sidelights and cornice, and is sheltered by a gabled Colonial Revival portico. The interior follows a typical central-chimney plan, with colonial-era and Federal period decorative elements.

The house was built about by David Lambert, one of Wilton's early settlers, and dates to circa 1726. Lambert purchased land in this area (then part of Norwalk) in 1722, and is recorded as having a "home lot" here in 1733. Lambert is credited with giving Wilton its name, which was given in honor of his father's English birthplace. He operated a tavern here, and his family continued to be prominent in Wilton affairs for many years. The house is now owned by the local historical society, which uses it as a museum and office.

== See also ==
- National Register of Historic Places listings in Fairfield County, Connecticut
- Eva L. Ogden
