= Connecticut Route 35 =

State highway in Fairfield County, Connecticut, US

Route 35
- Map of Fairfield County in southwestern Connecticut with Route 35 highlighted in red

Route information
- Maintained by CTDOT
- Length: 5.66 mi (9.11 km)
- Existed: 1932–present

Major junctions
- South end: NY 35 at the New York state line
- Route 102 in Ridgefield; Route 116 in Ridgefield
- North end: US 7 in Ridgefield

Location
- Country: United States
- State: Connecticut
- Counties: Fairfield

Highway system
- Connecticut State Highway System; Interstate; US; State; SSR; SR; Scenic
← Route 34	→ Route 37

Route 35 is a state highway in Connecticut, located entirely within the town of Ridgefield, Fairfield County. Route 35 begins as a continuation of NY 35 at the New York state line, and ends at U.S. Route 7 (US 7). The road is often used as an alternative to the congested Route 7. Originally part of New England Route 3 in the 1920s, Route 35 was designated in 1932.

== Route description ==
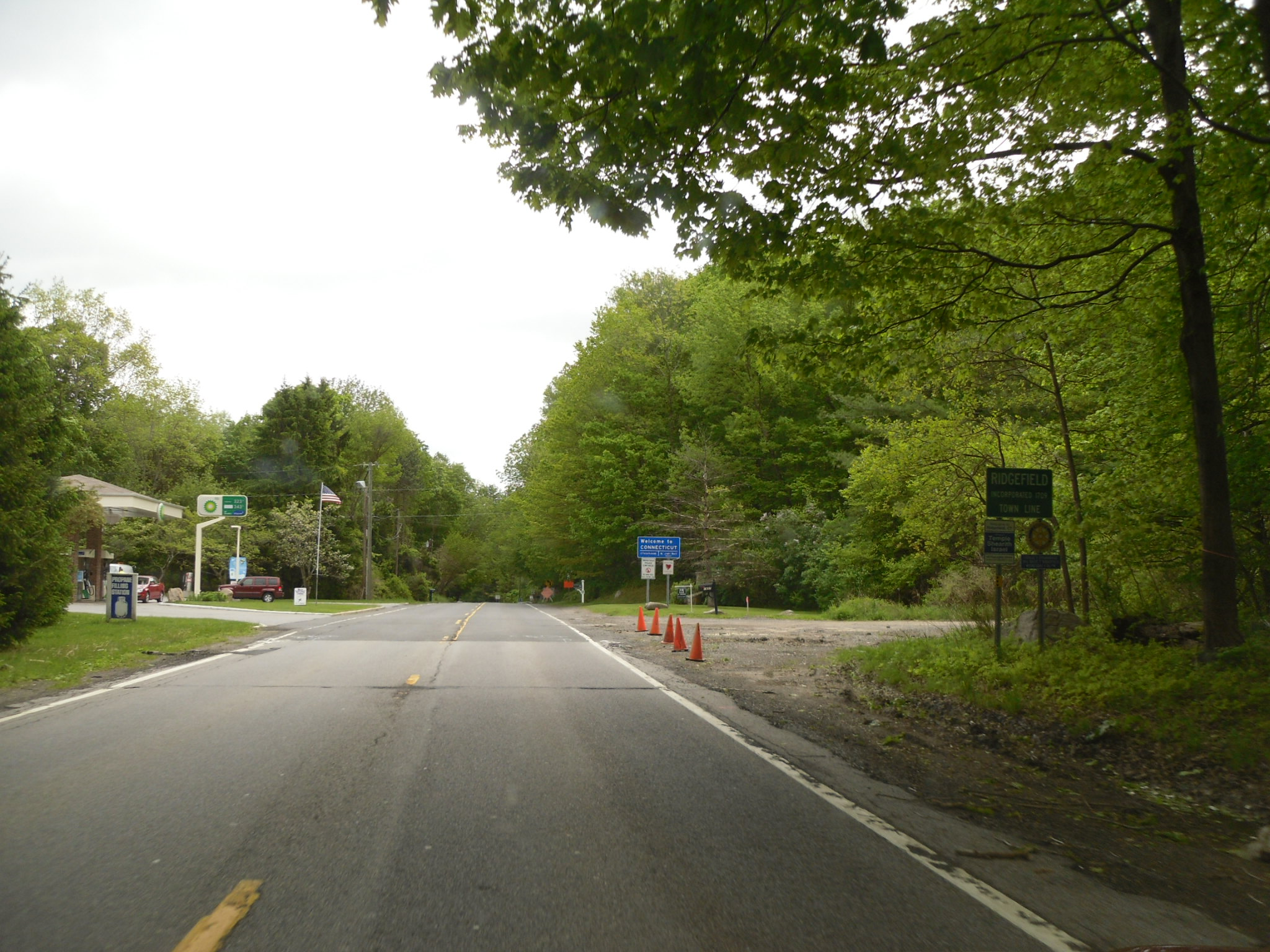
NY 35 approaching the CT state line, where CT 35 begins in the town of Ridgefield

Route 35 begins at the New York state line (where it continues west as NY 35) and heads east along South Salem Road and West Lane until Route 33 in downtown Ridgefield, about 1.8 miles (2.9 km) east of the state line. It then turns north along Main Street, taking over Route 33. After downtown Ridgefield, Route 35 turns right on Danbury Road while Route 116 begins straight ahead. Route 35 then proceeds in a northeast direction until it meets US 7 about 2.7 miles (4.3 km) later. Danbury Road continues as US 7.

== History ==
Modern Danbury Road in Ridgefield and Sugar Hollow Road in Danbury was first laid out as a turnpike in 1801 by the Danbury and Ridgefield Turnpike Corporation. The turnpike connected Ridgefield center and downtown Danbury. Tolls continued to be collected on the road until 1860 when the charter of the corporation was repealed.

Route 35 was originally part of New England Route 3 (designated in 1922), which was part of the main route connecting New York City and Hartford via Bedford and Danbury. Most of Route 3 became co-signed as U.S. Route 6 east of Danbury in 1927. A small portion south of Danbury was also assigned as part of U.S. Route 7 about a year later. In the 1932 state highway renumbering, the New England road numbering system was abandoned and the remaining section of old Route 3 west of US 7 was then designated as Route 35. Originally, Route 35 used West Lane from the state line to Main Street. This was realigned by 1934 to use South Salem Road (the modern alignment) instead. The original 35 became Route 35A. In 1963, this was renumbered as unsigned State Road 835. Around 1942, New York designated the continuation across the state line as New York State Route 35, creating a unified route from Peekskill to Ridgefield.

== Junction list ==
The entire route is in Fairfield County.

Location	mi	km	Destinations	Notes
Town of Ridgefield	0.00	0.00	NY 35 west – South Salem, Katonah	Continuation into New York
Town of Ridgefield	1.04	1.67	West Lane (SR 835 west)	Former Route 35A
Community of Ridgefield	1.80	2.90	Route 33 south – Wilton	Northern terminus of Route 33
Community of Ridgefield	2.01	3.23	Route 102 east – Branchville	Western terminus of Route 102
Community of Ridgefield	2.42	3.89	Catoonah Street (SR 822 west)	Former Route 102
Community of Ridgefield	2.96	4.76	Route 116 north – North Salem, NY	Southern terminus of Route 116
Town of Ridgefield	5.66	9.11	US 7 – Danbury, Brookfield, Wilton	Eastern terminus
1.000 mi = 1.609 km; 1.000 km = 0.621 mi

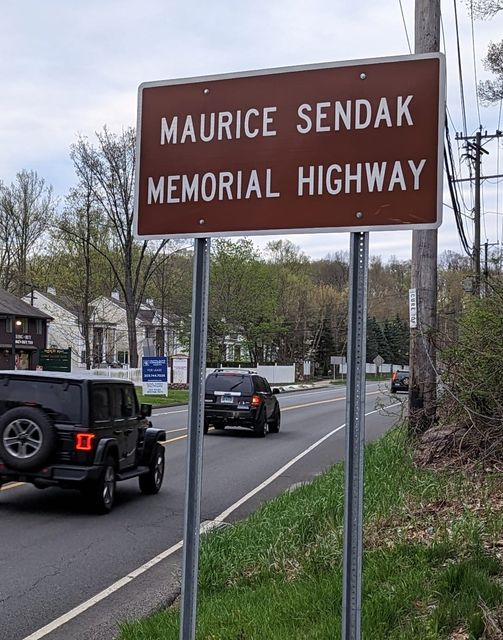
Road sign indicating the Maurice Sendak Memorial Highway, near the northern terminus of CT Rt. 35.

== Maurice Sendak Memorial Highway ==
In 2016, a 1.1-mile segment of Route 35, between Limestone Road and US 7, was designated as Maurice Sendak Memorial Highway, in honor of children’s author/illustrator Maurice Sendak, who was a longtime Ridgefield resident.
