= Connecticut Route 106 =

State highway in Fairfield County, Connecticut, US

Route 106
- Map of Fairfield County in southwestern Connecticut with Route 106 highlighted in red

Route information
- Maintained by CTDOT
- Length: 14.37 mi (23.13 km)
- Existed: 1963–present

Major junctions
- South end: I-95 / US 1 in Stamford
- Route 15 / Merritt Parkway in New Canaan; US 7 / Route 33 in Wilton
- North end: Route 53 in Wilton

Location
- Country: United States
- State: Connecticut
- Counties: Fairfield

Highway system
- Connecticut State Highway System; Interstate; US; State; SSR; SR; Scenic
← Route 104	→ Route 107

Route 106 is a state highway in southwestern Connecticut, running from Stamford to Wilton.

== Route description ==
Route 106 begins at a junction with I-95 and U.S. Route 1 (US 1) in the East Side of Stamford as Courtland Avenue then turning right on Glenbrook Road. It runs parallel to the New Canaan Line of the Metro-North Railroad, heading northeast through the northwest edge of Darien into the center of New Canaan. In Darien, the road is known as Hoyt Street. Upon entering the town of New Canaan, the road changes name to Old Stamford Road, where it has an interchange with Route 15 (Merritt Parkway) as it heads into Downtown New Canaan where it becomes Bank Street. It then continues north, briefly overlapping Route 124 for 0.62 miles (1.00 km) then heads eastward as East Avenue and Silvermine Road into the town of Wilton. In Wilton, the road is known as New Canaan Road and Wolfpit Road. Route 106 crosses the Norwalk River as well as the railroad tracks of the Danbury Branch then briefly overlaps US 7 and Route 33 for 0.18 miles (0.29 km) in downtown Wilton, then resumes its eastward journey along Sharp Hill Road then south along Chestnut Hill Road until its end at an intersection with Route 53.

== History ==
Route 106 was established as a result of the 1962 Route Reclassification Act from previously unsigned state-maintained roads. Middlesex Road, Hoyt Street, Old Stamford Road, and Park Street in Darien and New Canaan was taken over by the state in 1962 as SR 749. The following year, SR 749 was redesignated as part of Route 106. North of New Canaan, other former unsigned state roads (SR 403 and SR 414) were incorporated into the newly established Route 106. The route was extended to US 1 in Stamford in 1972. In 1998, the section in Wilton was moved from Belden Hill Road to Wolf Pit Road. Prior to the designation of modern Route 106, an older Route 106 along Center Road in Easton existed between 1935 and 1962. It connected Routes 58 and 59 via Easton Center.

== Junction list ==
The entire route is in Fairfield County.

Location	mi	km	Destinations	Notes
Stamford	0.00	0.00	I-95 / US 1 (East Main Street) – New York City, New Haven	Southern terminus; exit 9 on I-95
New Canaan	4.52	7.27	Route 15 / Merritt Parkway – New Haven, New York City	Exit 13 on Merritt Parkway
New Canaan	6.30	10.14	Route 124 south – Darien	Southern end of Route 124 concurrency
New Canaan	6.92	11.14	Route 124 north (Main Street)	Northern end of Route 124 concurrency
New Canaan	7.47	12.02	Route 123 – Ridgefield	
Wilton	12.26	19.73	US 7 south / Route 33 south – Westport	Southern end of US 7/Route 33 concurrency
Wilton	12.44	20.02	US 7 north / Route 33 north – Danbury, Ridgefield	Northern end of US 7/Route 33 concurrency
Wilton	14.37	23.13	Route 53 (Cedar Road)	Northern terminus
1.000 mi = 1.609 km; 1.000 km = 0.621 mi: Concurrency terminus
