= Connecticut Route 102 =

State highway in Fairfield County, Connecticut, US

Route 102
- Map of Fairfield County in southwestern Connecticut with Route 102 highlighted in red

Route information
- Maintained by CTDOT
- Length: 3.45 mi (5.55 km)
- Existed: 1932–present

Major junctions
- West end: Route 35 in Ridgefield
- East end: US 7 in Ridgefield

Location
- Country: United States
- State: Connecticut
- Counties: Fairfield

Highway system
- Connecticut State Highway System; Interstate; US; State; SSR; SR; Scenic
← Route 101	→ Route 103

Route 102 is a state highway in southwestern Connecticut running from the center of Ridgefield to the Branchville section of the same town.

== Route description ==
Route 102 begins at an intersection with Route 35 in Ridgefield center and heads east towards Branchville. It ends at a channelized intersection with U.S. 7 in Branchville, near the Branchville railroad station of the Danbury Branch of the Metro-North Railroad. The eastern terminus is located just west of the Ridgefield–Redding town line. The entire route is known as Branchville Road.

The entire length of Route 102 has been designated as the Robert Mugford Memorial Highway, named after a Connecticut Department of Transportation crew leader who was killed in August 2005 when a limousine struck him while placing orange safety cones along Route 7 in Norwalk. The limousine driver was found guilty and served 6 months in prison as well as permanent loss of his commercial drivers license. The portion of Route 7 where the accident occurred already had a commemorative name and the designation of nearby Route 102 was the compromise reached with the family.

== History ==
In the 1920s, Branchville Road was a secondary state highway known as Highway 329. In the 1932 state highway renumbering, Route 102 was created as a new route number for old Highway 329. At that time, Route 102 extended west of Route 35 along Catoonah Street, Barry Avenue, and West Mountain Road to the New York state line, where it continued as a local road. In 1963, as part of the Route Reclassification Act of 1961, the section west of Route 35 was supposed to be transferred to the town of Ridgefield. However, the town did not want to maintain that section of the road and the transfer remained in arbitration until 1979 when the state lost its case. In March 1979, the Route 102 designation west of Route 35, including the short overlap with Route 35, was officially removed and re-designated as State Road 822, an unsigned state-maintained road.

== Junction list ==
The entire route is in Fairfield County.

Location	mi	km	Destinations	Notes
Community of Ridgefield	0.00	0.00	Route 35 – Danbury, Wilton	Western terminus
Town of Ridgefield	3.45	5.55	US 7 – Danbury, Wilton	Eastern terminus; to Branchville station
1.000 mi = 1.609 km; 1.000 km = 0.621 mi
