= Carter Vail =

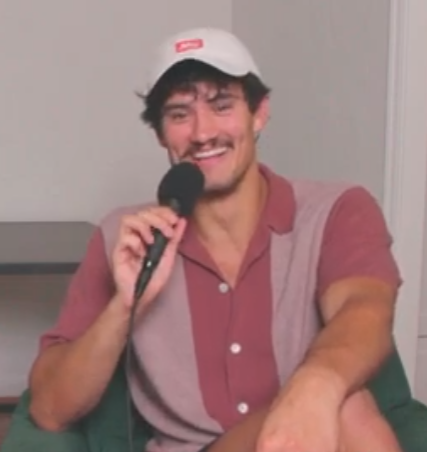
- In a 2024 interview
- Born: 1996 or 1997 (age 29–30)
- Education: University of Miami
- Occupations: Content creator; musician
- Years active: 2018–present
- Musical career
- Genres: Indie rock; comedy music
- Label: Assemble Sound
- Website: cartervail.com

Carter Vail (born 1996 or 1997) is an American content creator and musician. Vail first became popular in April 2024 after releasing a musical sketch on TikTok entitled "Dirt Man".

== Early life, education and career ==
Vail played in a band in middle and high school in Wilton, Connecticut.

He studied audio engineering at the University of Miami. He briefly worked at a guitar pedal factory after graduating from university. He quit his job at the factory after two weeks of working there. Before his factory job, he worked at music studios as a repair person. He and some friends then decided to open a studio in Nashville, Tennessee.

== Musical career ==
Vail first became known after the release of his 2018 debut song "Melatonin". His debut album Red Eyes was released in 2020.

He began to post "short comedy songs" to social media because of a lack of people hiring his studio for work. In April 2024, he released a comedy musical sketch on TikTok entitled "Dirt Man." The Boston Globe described the "roughly 30-second" bossa nova track as being "about a mythical, cowboy-hat-wearing figure who visits men at night and takes them to his mountain lair if they forget to leave some dirt under their pillows." The track went viral on the Internet, reaching 20 million views on social media by July 2024 and becoming his most popular song.

His musical inspirations include the bands Vampire Weekend and The National. He describes his non-comedy music as indie rock.

He signed to the Detroit-based record label Assemble Sound in December 2022. His LP 100 Cowboys was released on the label in July 2024. Vail's most recent album, Coydog, was released under RCA Records in October 2025.

== Personal life ==
As of June 2024, Vail lives in Los Angeles and is a full-time musician. His roommate is producer and songwriter Noah Tauscher.

== Discography ==
Partial list of studio albums, with selected details
Title	Album details
Red Eyes	Released: April 3, 2020; Label: Self-released; Format: Digital download, streaming
The Interstellar Tennis Championship Vol. II	Released: 2023; Format: Digital download, streaming
100 Cowboys	Released: July 19, 2024; Label: Assemble Sound; Format: Digital download, streaming
Coydog	Released: October 17, 2025; Label: RCA Records; Format: Digital download, streaming
