= Sloan-Raymond-Fitch House =

Historic house in Connecticut, United States

- U.S. National Register of Historic Places
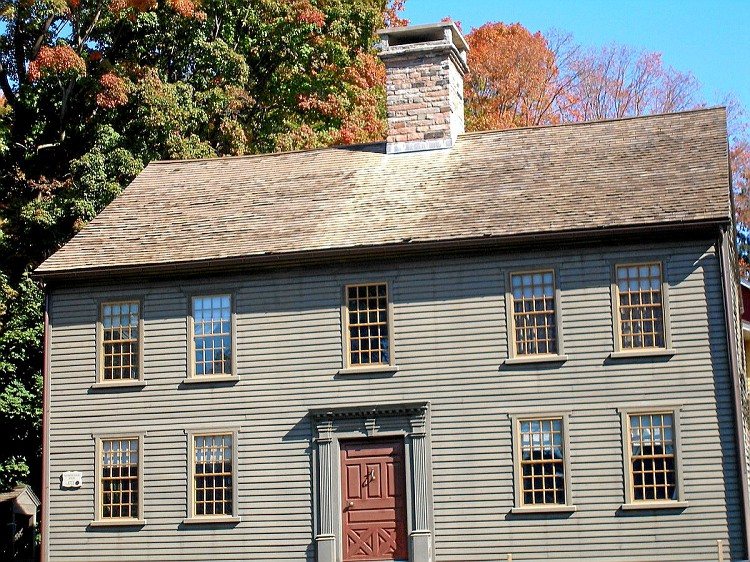

- Location within Connecticut Location within the United States
- Location: 224 Danbury Road, Wilton, Connecticut
- Coordinates: 41°11′18″N 73°25′32″W
- Area: 0.2 acres (0.081 ha)
- Built: 1772
- NRHP reference No.: 82004344
- Added to NRHP: April 29, 1982

The Sloan-Raymond-Fitch House is a historic house at 224 Danbury Road in Wilton, Connecticut. It is a 2 1/2-story wood-frame structure, five bays wide, with a side-gable roof and a large central chimney. A smaller two-story ell extends to the rear. The main block is evaluated to have been built sometime between 1760 and 1780, based on the construction methods used, while the ell is believed to be an older structure. The building has undergone some form of restorative work on several occasions, but has retained a significant amount of its original workmanship, and is a well-preserved 18th-century structure. The house has been moved from its original location. It is now on the same property as the Betts-Sturges-Blackmar House, and is part of a museum complex operated by the Wilton Historical Society.

The house was listed on the National Register of Historic Places in 1982.

== See also ==
- National Register of Historic Places listings in Fairfield County, Connecticut
