= Hurlbutt Street School =

- U.S. National Register of Historic Places
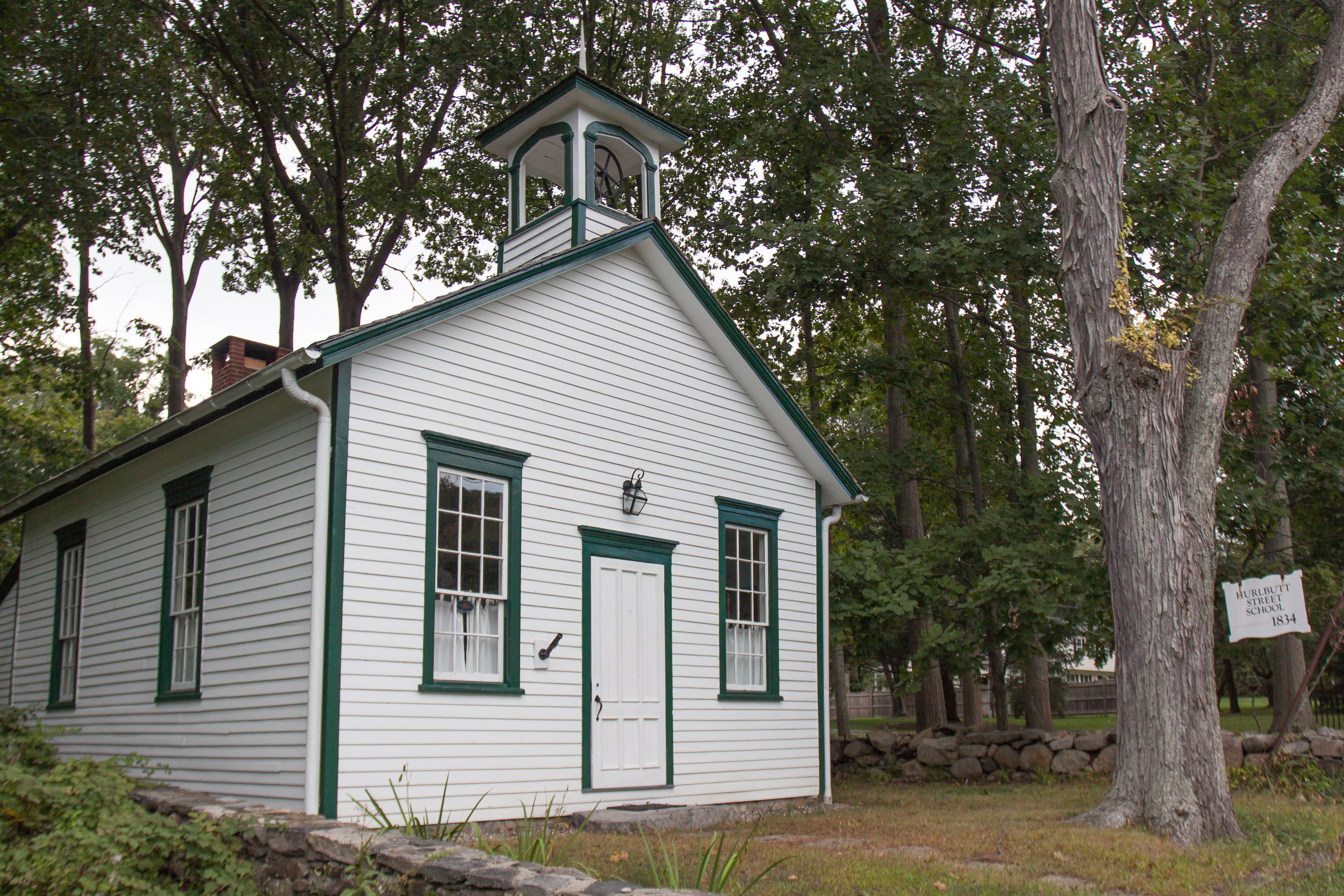

- Location within Connecticut Location within the United States
- Location: 157 Hurlbutt Street, Wilton, Connecticut
- Coordinates: 41°12′04″N 73°24′34″W
- Area: 0.3 acres (0.12 ha)
- Built: 1834
- NRHP reference No.: 96000774
- Added to NRHP: July 25, 1996

The Hurlbutt Street School is a historic one-room schoolhouse at 157 Hurlbutt Street in Wilton, Connecticut. Built in 1834, it served the town as a school for nearly a century, and was then converted into a local history museum. It is the town's best-preserved 19th-century district school building, and was listed on the National Register of Historic Places in 1996.

== Description and history ==
The Hurlbutt Street School stands in rural suburban eastern Wilton, on the west side of Hurlbutt Street between Friendlee Lane and Sharp Hill Road. It is a single-story wood-frame structure, with a gable roof and clapboarded exterior. The roof is capped by a belfry with pilastered arches that are topped by a cupola. A shed-roof addition extends to the rear. The main facade, set beneath one of the roof gables, is three bays wide, with sash windows flanking the center entrance. The interior is finished with plaster walls and pine flooring, and is decorated to show what an early 20th-century schoolhouse looked like. Not far from the schoolhouse stands an outhouse which is known to date to 1925 or earlier.

The schoolhouse was built in 1834, on a site nearby that had been used for schools since at least 1792. It was built by local townspeople at no cost to the town, and served as a district school until the town consolidated its schools in 1935. The local ladies' auxiliary, which had been formed a few years earlier to support improvements to the school, was then converted into a nonprofit organization dedicated to its preservation and conversion into a museum.

== See also ==
- National Register of Historic Places listings in Fairfield County, Connecticut
