= Marvin Tavern =

Historic tavern in Connecticut, United States

- U.S. National Register of Historic Places
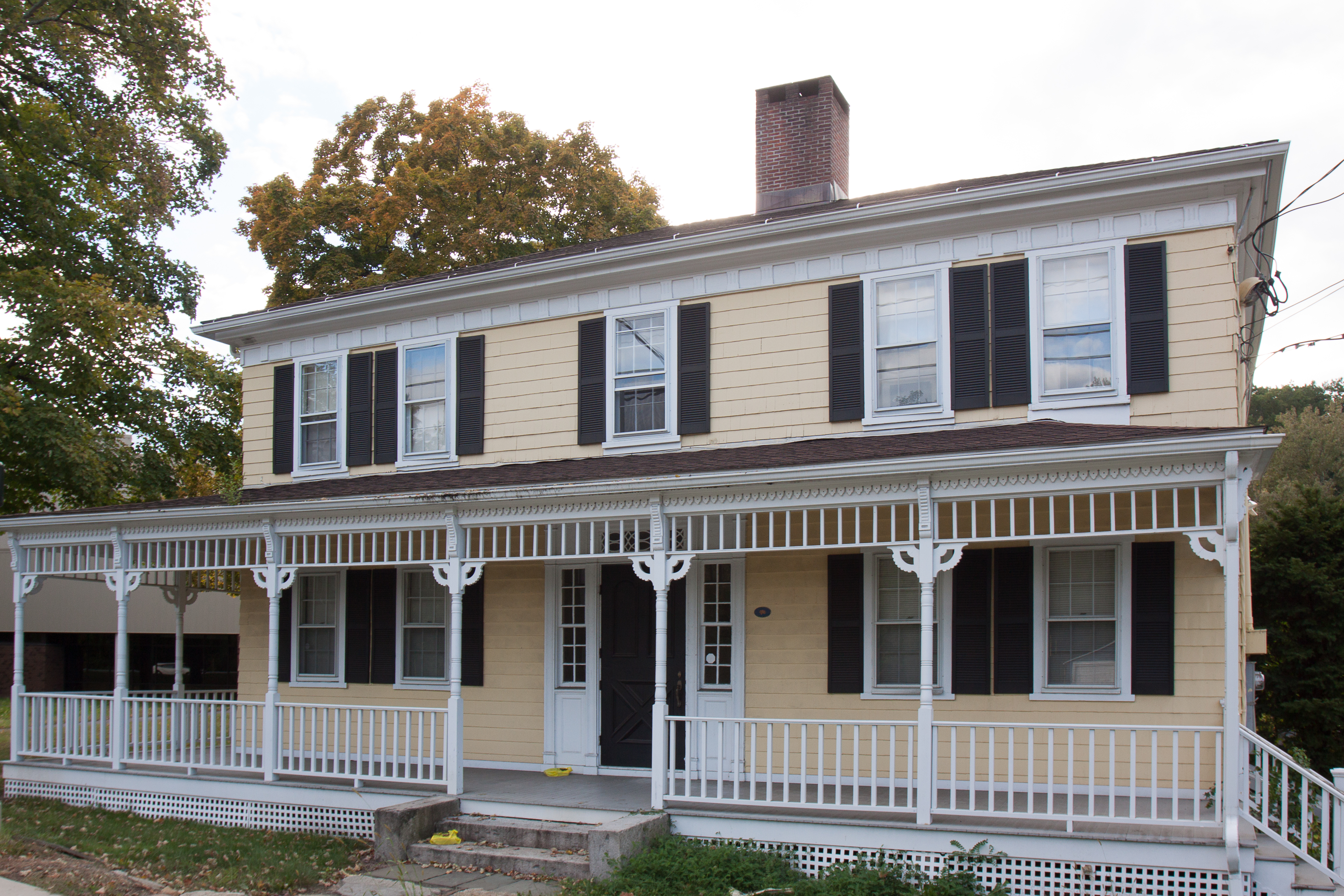

- Location within Connecticut Location within the United States
- Location: 405 Danbury Road, Wilton, Connecticut
- Coordinates: 41°12′42″N 73°25′58″W
- Area: 0.6 acres (0.24 ha)
- Built: 1760
- Architect: Marvin, Matthew V.
- Architectural style: Colonial, Georgian, Queen Anne
- NRHP reference No.: 84000806
- Added to NRHP: April 26, 1984

The Marvin Tavern, also known as Matthew Marvin House, is a historic house located at 405 Danbury Road in Wilton, Connecticut, Located adjacent to Wilton High School. It is a 2 1/2-story wood-frame structure, with a hip roof and a large central chimney. Although it was built c. 1760, its most prominent feature is its porch, added c. 1880, which features turned posts, a spindled frieze, and decorative jigsawn brackets. It is also of interest to architectural historians for a number of features, including its flared eaves, which were rare in the region before the 19th century.

The house was listed on the National Register of Historic Places in 1984.

== See also ==
- National Register of Historic Places listings in Fairfield County, Connecticut
