= Ridgefield (CDP), Connecticut =

Ridgefield, Connecticut
- Census-designated place
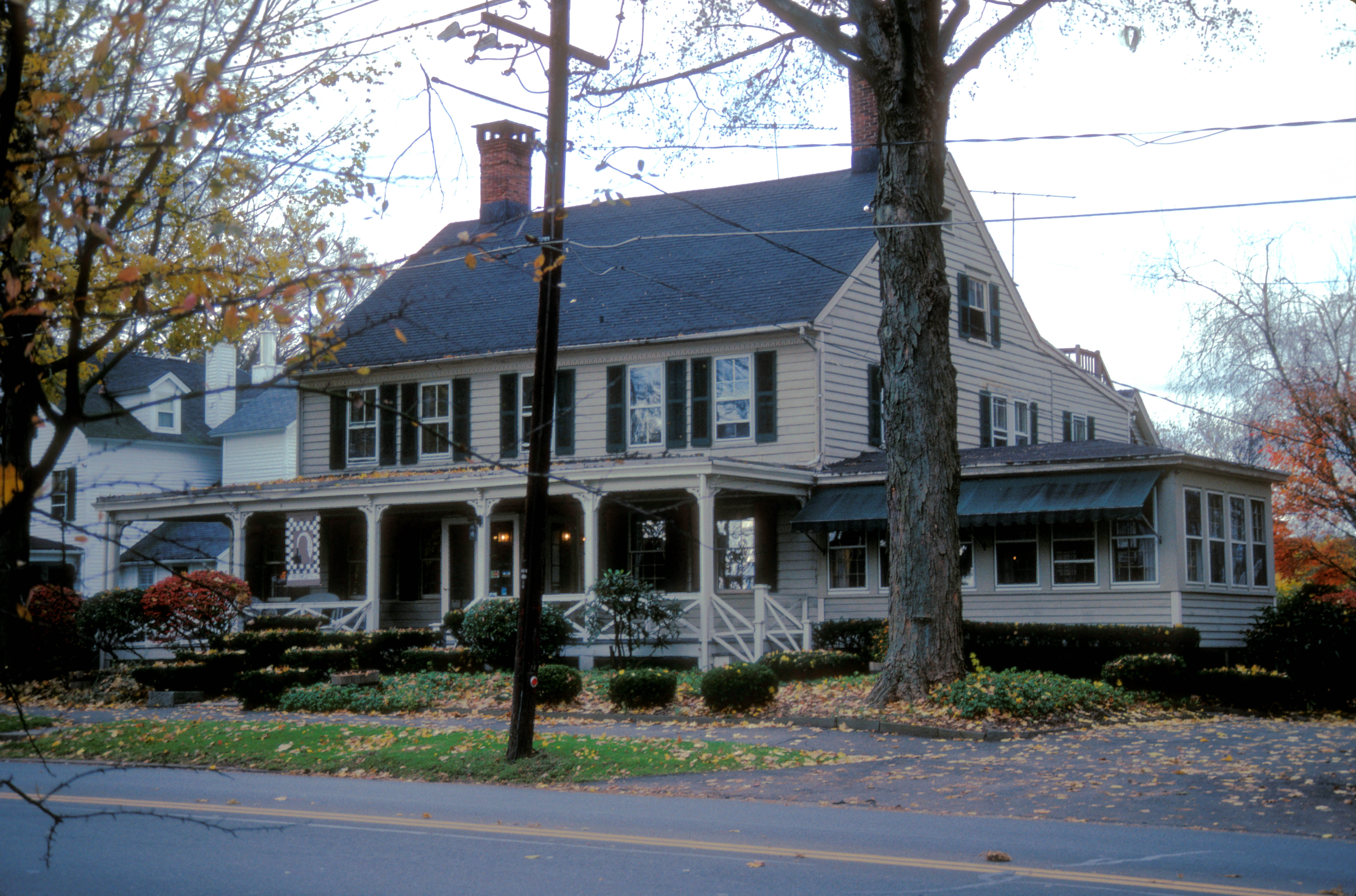
- Elms Tavern, built in 1799

- Location within the Western Connecticut Planning Region and the state of Connecticut
- Coordinates: 41°16′48″N 73°29′54″W
- State: Connecticut
- County: Fairfield
- Town: Ridgefield

Area
  - Total: 6.40 sq mi (16.58 km^{2})
  - Land: 6.40 sq mi (16.57 km^{2})
  - Water: 0.0077 sq mi (0.02 km^{2})
- Elevation: 749 ft (228 m)

Population (2010)
  - Total: 7,645
  - Density: 1,195/sq mi (461.5/km^{2})
- ZIP Code: 06877
- FIPS code: 09-63900
- GNIS feature ID: 2377856

Ridgefield is a census-designated place (CDP) in Fairfield County, Connecticut, United States. It consists of the primary central village in the town of Ridgefield and surrounding residential areas. As of the 2020 census, the population of the CDP was 7,596, out of 25,053 in the entire town.

== Geography ==
The CDP is in the southern part of the town of Ridgefield.

Roads include:

- Connecticut Route 33, Ridgefield's Main Street.
- Connecticut Route 35
- Connecticut Route 102 (Branchville Road) leads east from Main Street.
- Connecticut Route 116 (North Salem Road) leads northwest from the north end of Main Street.

According to the U.S. Census Bureau, the Ridgefield CDP has an area of 6.4 square miles (16.6 km^{2}), of which 0.01 square miles (0.02 km^{2}), or 0.11%, are water.

== Demographics ==
As of the census of 2010, there were 7,645 people, 3,046 households, and 2,018 families residing in the CDP. The population density was 1,195 inhabitants per square mile (461/km^{2}). There were 3,321 housing units, of which 275, or 8.3%, were vacant. The racial makeup of the CDP was 93.6% White, 1.0% African American, 0.1% Native American or Alaska Native, 3.0% Asian, 0.03% Native Hawaiian or Pacific Islander, 0.8% some other race, and 1.5% from two or more races. Hispanic or Latino of any race were 4.2% of the population.

Of the 3,046 households in the community, 36.0% had children under the age of 18 living with them, 56.8% were headed by married couples living together, 7.4% had a female householder with no husband present, and 33.7% were non-families. 30.0% of all households were made up of individuals, and 14.0% were someone living alone who was 65 years of age or older. The average household size was 2.51, and the average family size was 3.17.

27.8% of the CDP population were under the age of 18, 4.3% were from 18 to 24, 20.5% were from 25 to 44, 31.7% were from 45 to 64, and 15.4% were 65 years of age or older. The median age was 43.5 years. For every 100 females, there were 90.1 males. For every 100 females age 18 and over, there were 85.0 males.

For the period 2013–17, the estimated median annual income for a household in the CDP was $125,595, and the median income for a family was $165,333. The per capita income was $74,017. Male full-time workers had a median income of $112,273 versus $40,132 for females. About 0.9% of families and 2.5% of the population were living below the poverty line, including 2.9% of those under age 18 and 4.0% of those age 65 and over.
