= New York Watercolor Society =

The New York Watercolor Society, also known as the New York Water Color Society, was a "short-lived" organization founded in 1850 by in part by John William Hill. It led to the founding of the American Watercolor Society in 1866.

== History ==
It was an early watercolor organization, following the 1804 establishment of the first Watercolor Society in England called the Society of Painters in Water Colours, the present day renamed Royal Watercolour Society.

The name of the organization was sometimes confused with the New York Watercolor Club. For instance Childe Hassam was said to be the Society's first president (1889), but he was the first president of the New York Watercolor Club.

== See also ==
- Arts organizations based in New York City
