= Wilton Center Historic District =

Historic district in Connecticut, United States

- U.S. National Register of Historic Places
- U.S. Historic district
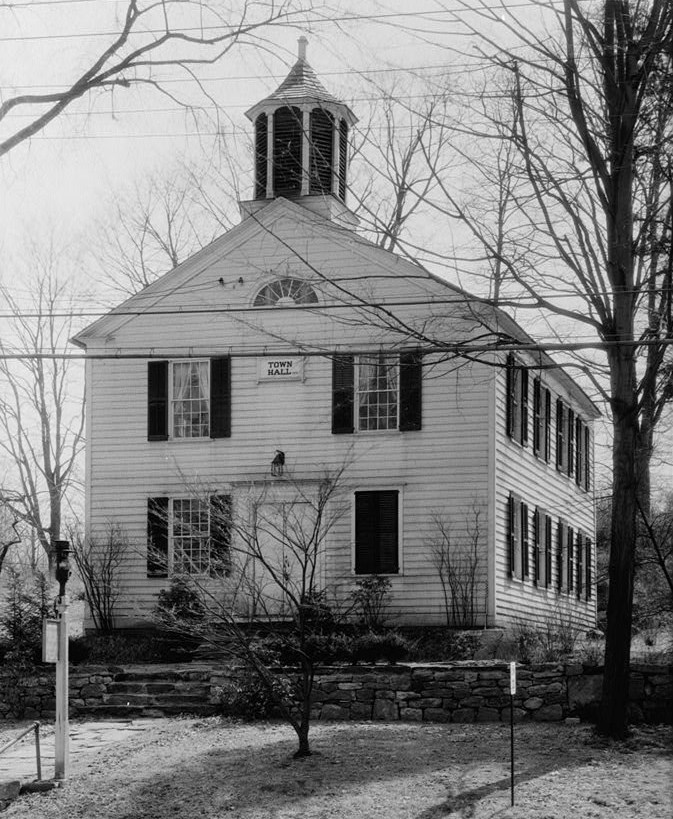
- Wilton Town Hall in 1937

- Location within Connecticut Location within the United States
- Location: Roughly, area around Junction of Lovers Lane and Belden Hill and Ridgefield Roads, Wilton, Connecticut
- Coordinates: 41°11′43″N 73°26′20″W
- Architectural style: Colonial Revival, Colonial, Federal
- NRHP reference No.: 92001003
- Added to NRHP: August 19, 1992

The Wilton Center Historic District in the town center area of Wilton, Connecticut, was established as a town historic district in 1970 and was listed on the National Register of Historic Places in 1992.

Wilton's town center was formed in 1726 when the first meetinghouse was built. That meetinghouse was replaced with a new building in 1738, and finally in 1790 by a third church, the current Congregational Church at 70 Ridgefield Road. That church is the oldest church building in Fairfield County and a central element of the historic district.

The historic district includes examples of Colonial Revival, Colonial, and Federal styles of architecture. In addition to the Congregational Church, some of the specific buildings located in the historic district are:

- Daniel Gregory House, 11 Belden Hill Road, built c. 1775
- Original Congregational Church Parsonage, 65 Ridgefield Road, built 1832
- Old Town Hall, 69 Ridgefield Road, built 1832
- Nathan Comstock House, 77 Ridgefield Road, built c. 1810
- Winton House, 80 Ridgefield Road, built 1926
- Halsey House, 98 Ridgefield Road, built 1934
- Deodate Davenport House, 108 Ridgefield Road, built 1791

The district includes the Wilton Academy. The shape of the district is very irregular.

== See also ==
- National Register of Historic Places listings in Fairfield County, Connecticut
- Wilton Center, Connecticut, a census-designated place
