= Connecticut Route 33 =

State highway in Fairfield County, Connecticut, US

Route 33
- Map of Fairfield County in southwestern Connecticut with Route 33 highlighted in red

Route information
- Maintained by CTDOT
- Length: 14.41 mi (23.19 km)
- Existed: 1932–present

Major junctions
- South end: I-95 / Route 136 in Westport
- Route 15 / Merritt Parkway in Westport; US 7 in Wilton
- North end: Route 35 in Ridgefield

Location
- Country: United States
- State: Connecticut
- Counties: Fairfield

Highway system
- Connecticut State Highway System; Interstate; US; State; SSR; SR; Scenic
← Route 32	→ Route 34

Route 33 is a 14.41-mile (23.19 km), secondary north–south state highway in the U.S. state of Connecticut, from Westport to Ridgefield.

== Route description ==
Route 33 begins at an intersection with Route 136 and I-95 in Westport. It heads north, intersecting with Route 1, Route 57, and Route 15 (Merritt Parkway) before crossing into Norwalk. Route 33 barely crosses the northeastern corner of Norwalk before continuing into Wilton. Where it passes through the Wilton Center Historic District.

In Wilton, Route 33 heads northwest, crossing Route 53 before joining Route 7 and Route 106, in that order, to form a triple concurrency. Route 106 leaves the concurrency shortly after joining, and Route 7 and Route 33 continue northwest for approximately another mile before Route 7 turns off to the north. Route 33 continues northwest and west before turning north into Ridgefield.

In Ridgefield, Route 33 continues north to end at an intersection with Route 35.

In Wilton, Route 33 is a Scenic Route known as Ridgefield Road from Old Ridgewood Road #1 to the Ridgefield town line.

== History ==
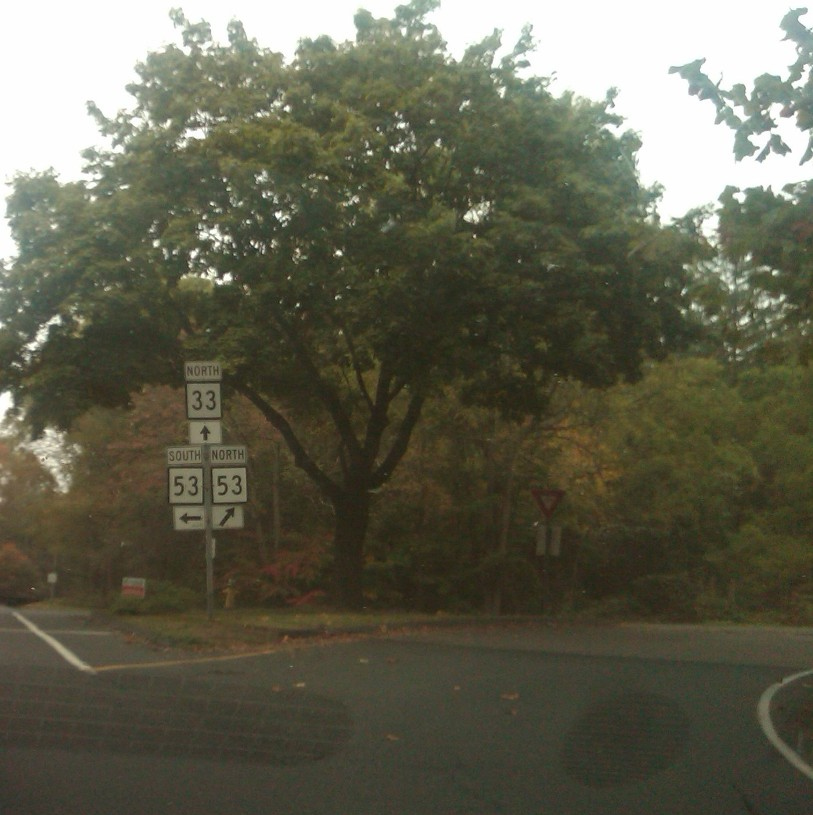
Intersection of Connecticut Route 33 and Connecticut Route 53.

Route 33 was commissioned in 1932 from parts of former 1920s state highways 304 and 176. In 1967, the northern end was truncated from New York state line to the intersection with modern Route 116 in Ridgefield. In 1978, the concurrency with Route 35 was deleted and the northern end truncated from Route 116 to its current location at Route 35.

== Junction list ==
The entire route is in Fairfield County.

Location	mi	km	Destinations	Notes
Westport	0.00	0.00	I-95 / Route 136 – New Haven, New York City, Saugatuck	Southern terminus; exit 17 on I-95; to Westport station
Westport	1.60	2.57	US 1 (Post Road) – Norwalk, Southport	
Westport	2.01	3.23	Route 57 north – Westport Center	Southern terminus of Route 57
Westport	3.35	5.39	Route 15 / Merritt Parkway – New Haven, New York City	Exit 20 on Merritt Parkway
Wilton	4.67	7.52	Route 53 – Weston, Norwalk	
Wilton	5.91	9.51	US 7 south to Route 15 / Merritt Parkway	Southern end of US 7 concurrency
Wilton	6.17	9.93	Route 106 south – Wilton Center	Southern end of Route 106 concurrency
Wilton	6.35	10.22	Route 106 north	Northern end of Route 106 concurrency
Wilton	7.18	11.56	US 7 north – Wilton station	Northern end of US 7 concurrency
Ridgefield	14.41	23.19	Route 35	Northern terminus
1.000 mi = 1.609 km; 1.000 km = 0.621 mi: Concurrency terminus
