= Norwalk River =

Coordinates: 41.100°N 73.415°W

Norwalk
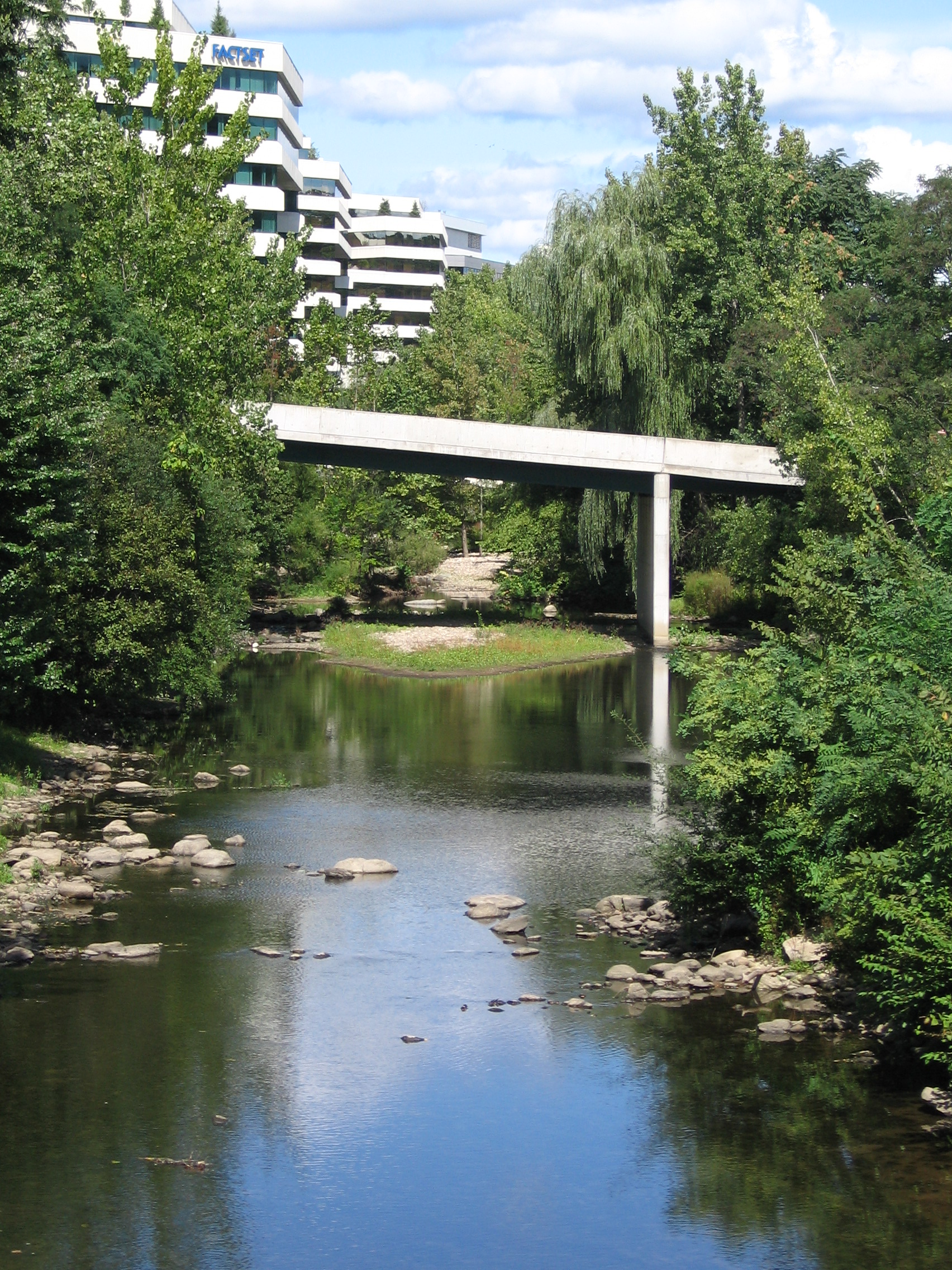

Location
- Country: United States

Physical characteristics
- Source
  - location: Ridgefield, Connecticut
  - elevation: 507 ft (155 m) at source to sea level at mouth
- Mouth
  - location: Long Island Sound at Norwalk, Connecticut
- Length: 23 mi (37 km)

The Norwalk River is a river in southwestern Connecticut, United States, approximately 21 miles (34 km) long. The word "Norwalk" comes from the Algonquian word "noyank" meaning "point of land".

== Description ==
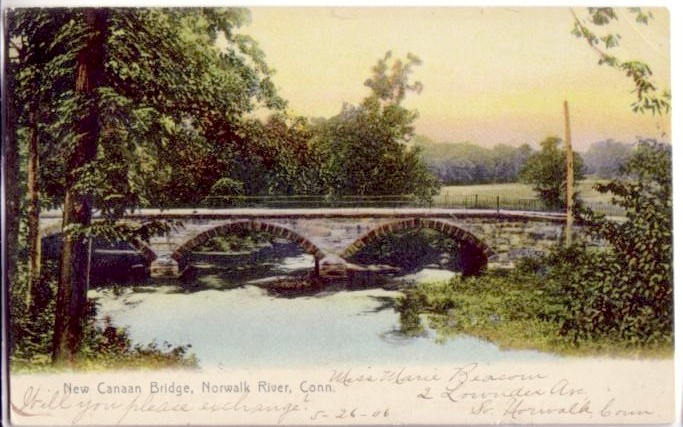
New Canaan Bridge over the river, from a postcard (1906)

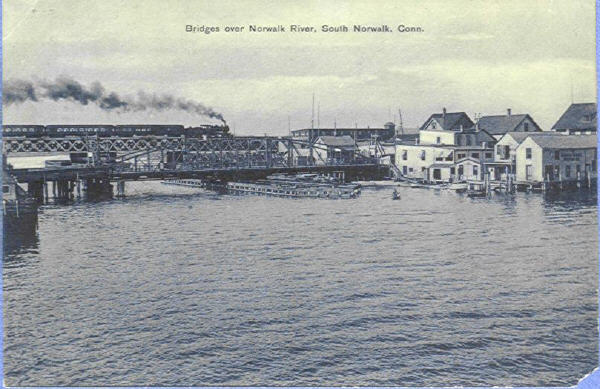
Railroad Bridge between South Norwalk and East Norwalk over the Norwalk River (from a postcard mailed in 1914)

The Norwalk River originates in ponds located in Ridgefield, Connecticut. These ponds empty into Ridgefield’s approximately 500-acre (2.0 km^{2}) "Great Swamp". The river continues through Ridgefield, and is augmented by the "Great Pond" (507 feet (155 m) above sea level), one of the purest lakes in Connecticut due to its being fed by underwater springs. The river is closely paralleled by U.S. Route 7 as it flows southward through Branchville, Georgetown, Wilton, and Norwalk, where it is joined by the Silvermine River and then flows into Norwalk Harbor and finally into Long Island Sound.

Recreational fishing continues to be a popular sport along the course of the river, in addition to oystering at the river’s mouth in Norwalk.

A 20-year-old man drowned in the river on May 24, 2009 while trying to save a boy who slipped into a strong current near Broad Street in Northern Norwalk, near the Route 7 Connector. The boy had been playing in knee-deep water. Jose Higareda, a Mexican immigrant living in Norwalk, jumped in the water with the boy's father, but Higareda was himself dragged downstream toward Deering Pond. The boy survived.

== Great Flood of 1955 ==
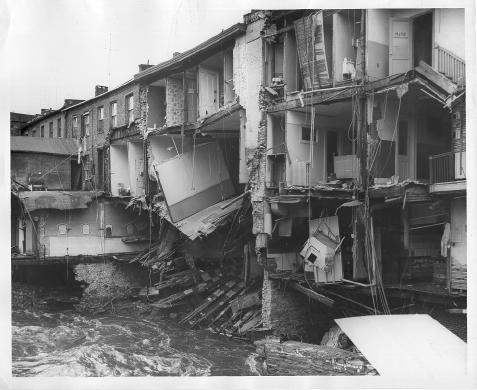
Norwalk, Main and Wall Street, October 16, 1955

Over the weekend of October 14–17, 1955, 12 to 14 inches (300 to 360 mm) of tropical storm rain caused the Norwalk River, along with many other Connecticut rivers, to severely flood. (The statewide destruction prompted President Eisenhower to declare a disaster area in Connecticut.) The flood of 1955 caused the most severe damage of any flood in the history of Norwalk. From the heavy rains some dams along the Norwalk River broke, sending walls of water surging downstream, knocking out bridges and additional dams. Many of the Norwalk River’s neighboring towns and communities suffered widespread devastation. Several people died in addition to millions of dollars' worth of damage along the Norwalk River watershed alone.

== Pictures ==
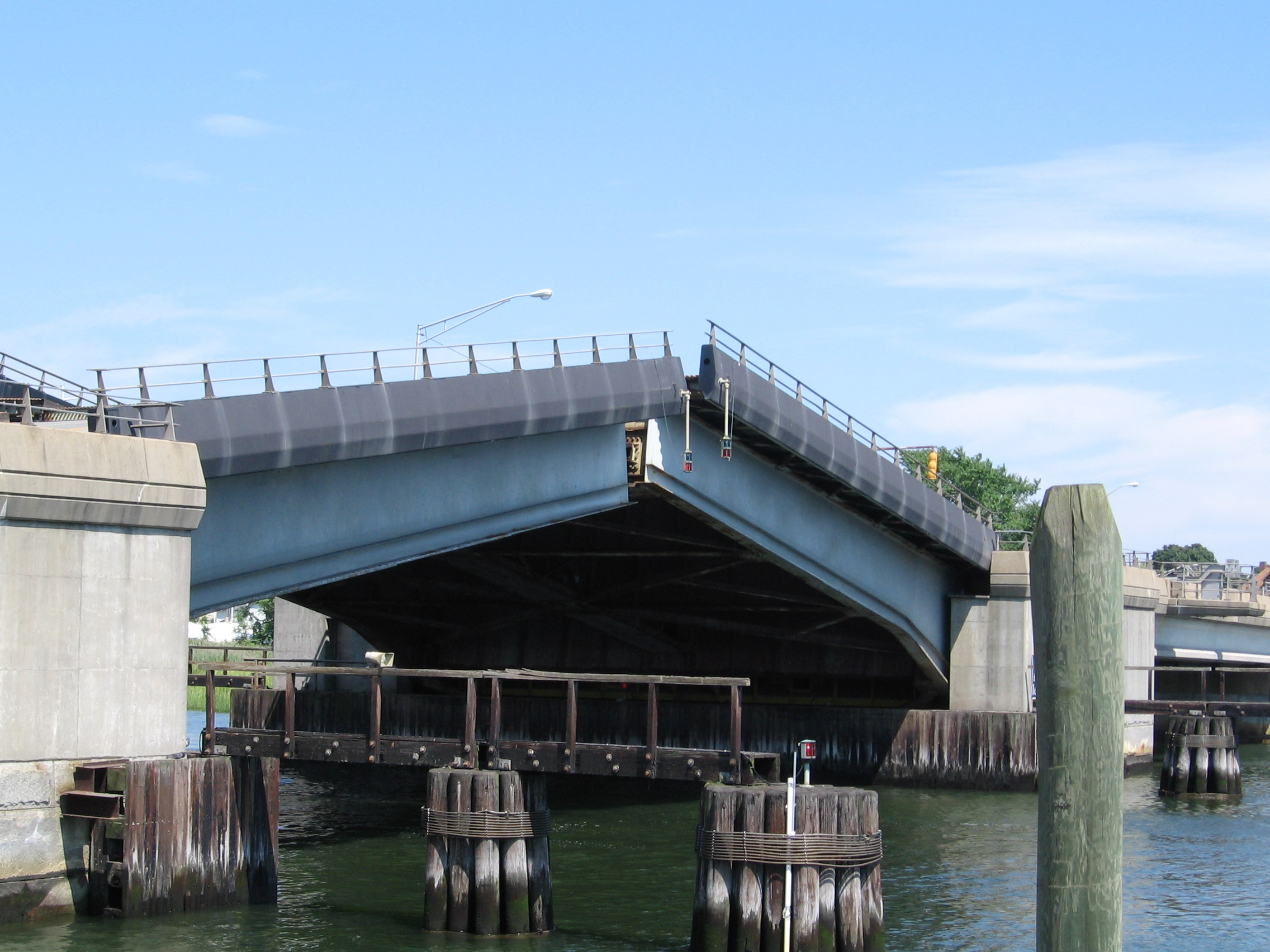
Stroffolino Bridge closing, Norwalk.

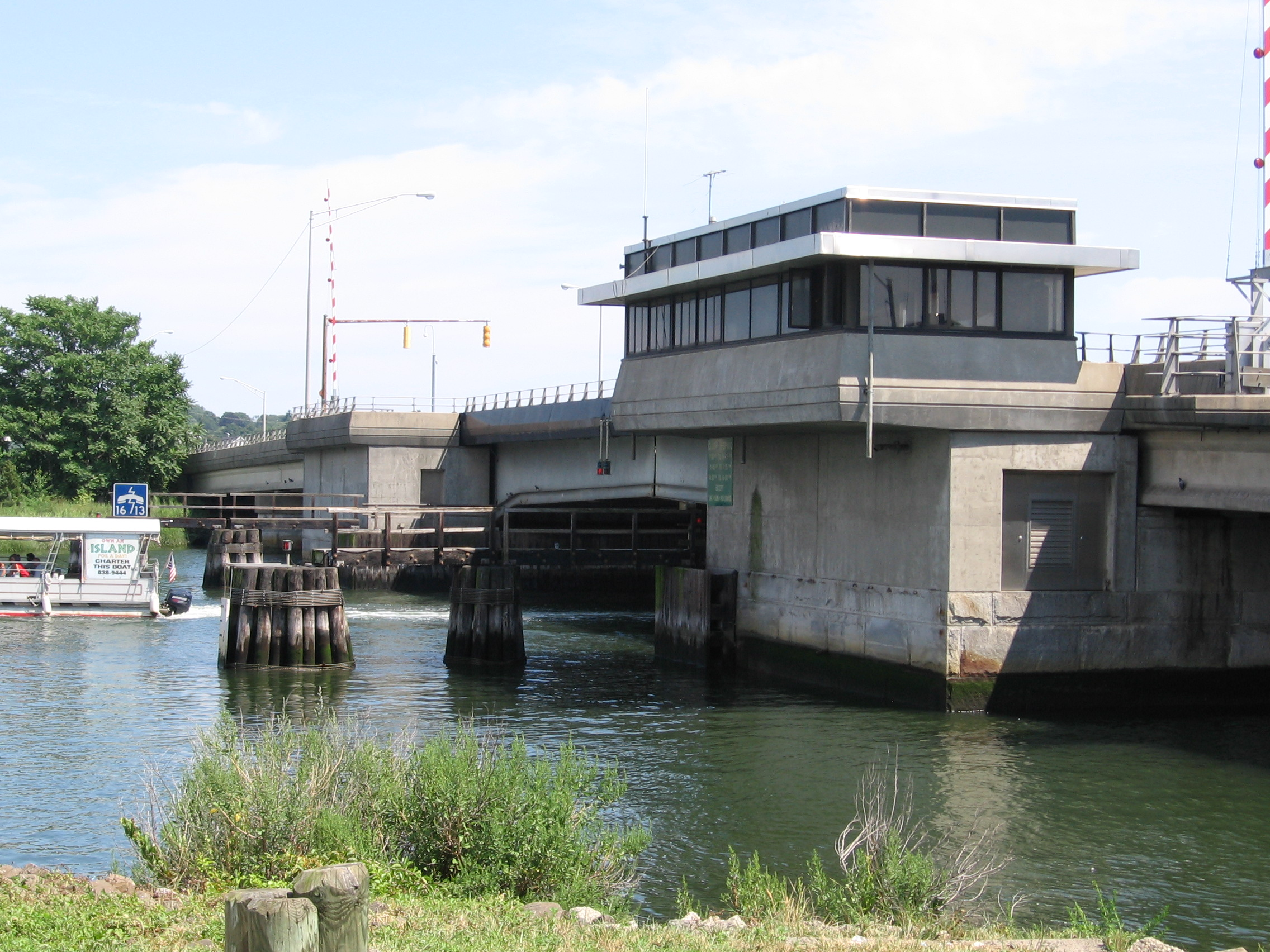
Stroffolino Bridge, north side.

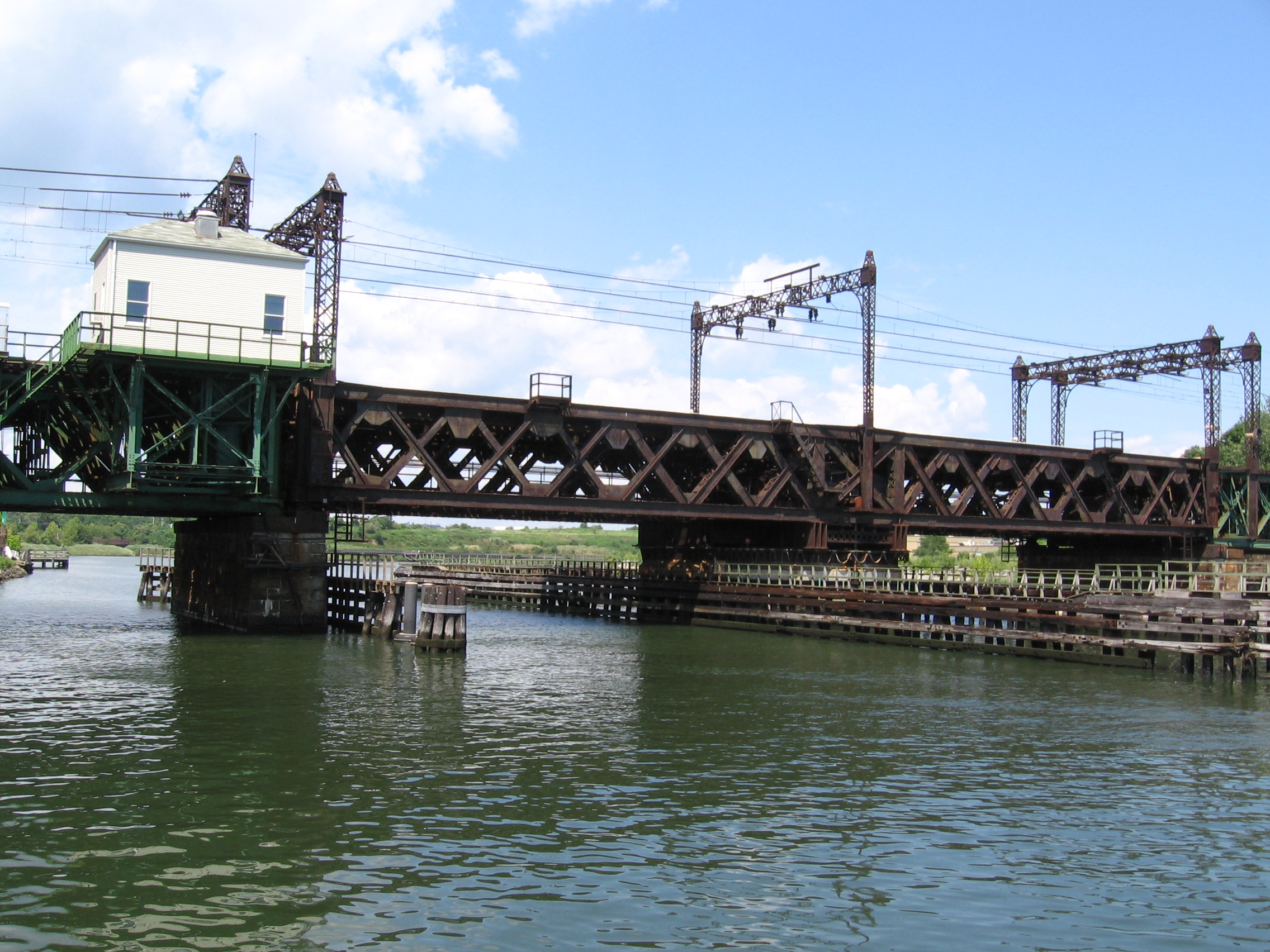
Swing railroad bridge, Norwalk.

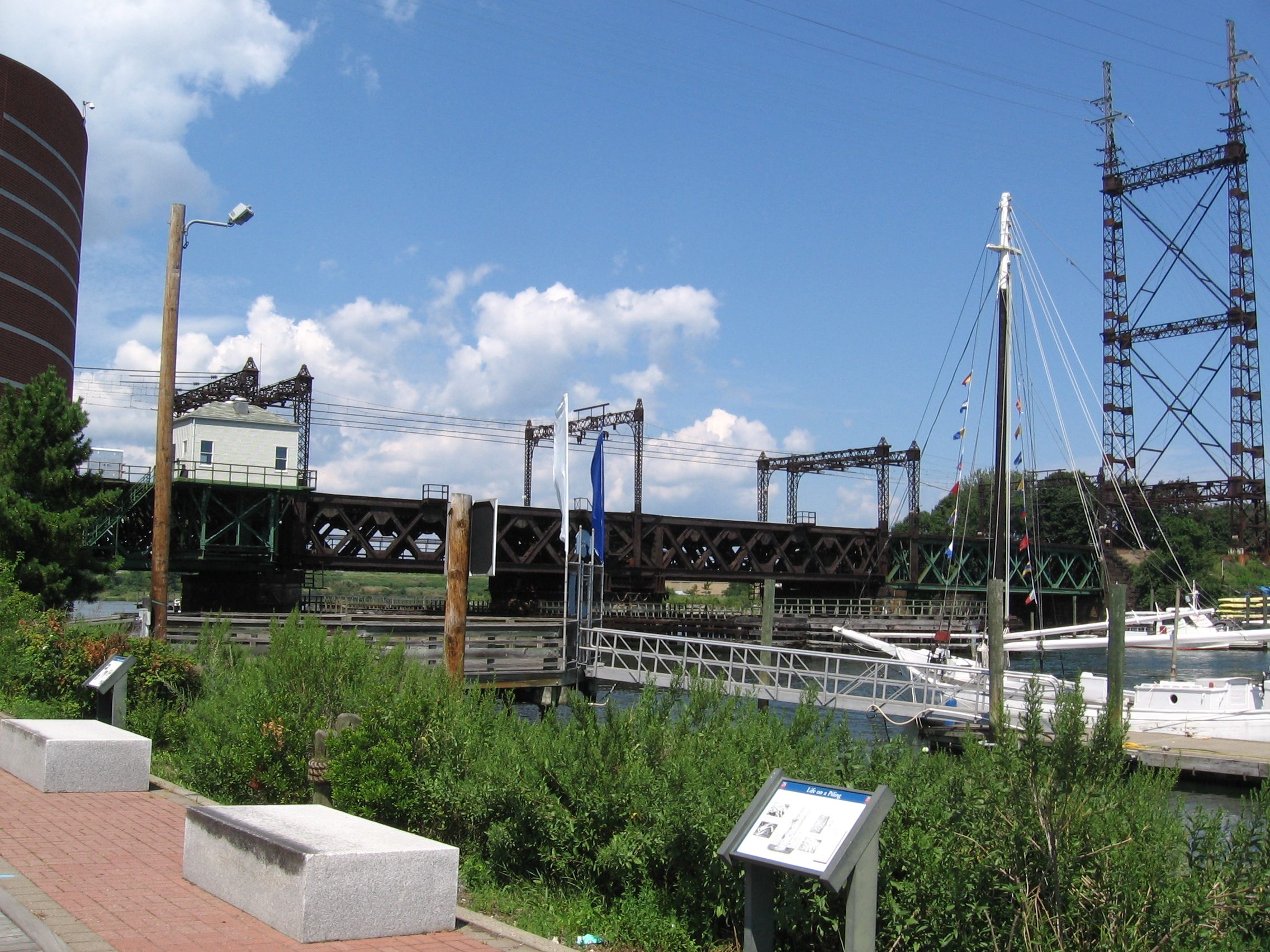
Swing Bridge in Norwalk, longer view.

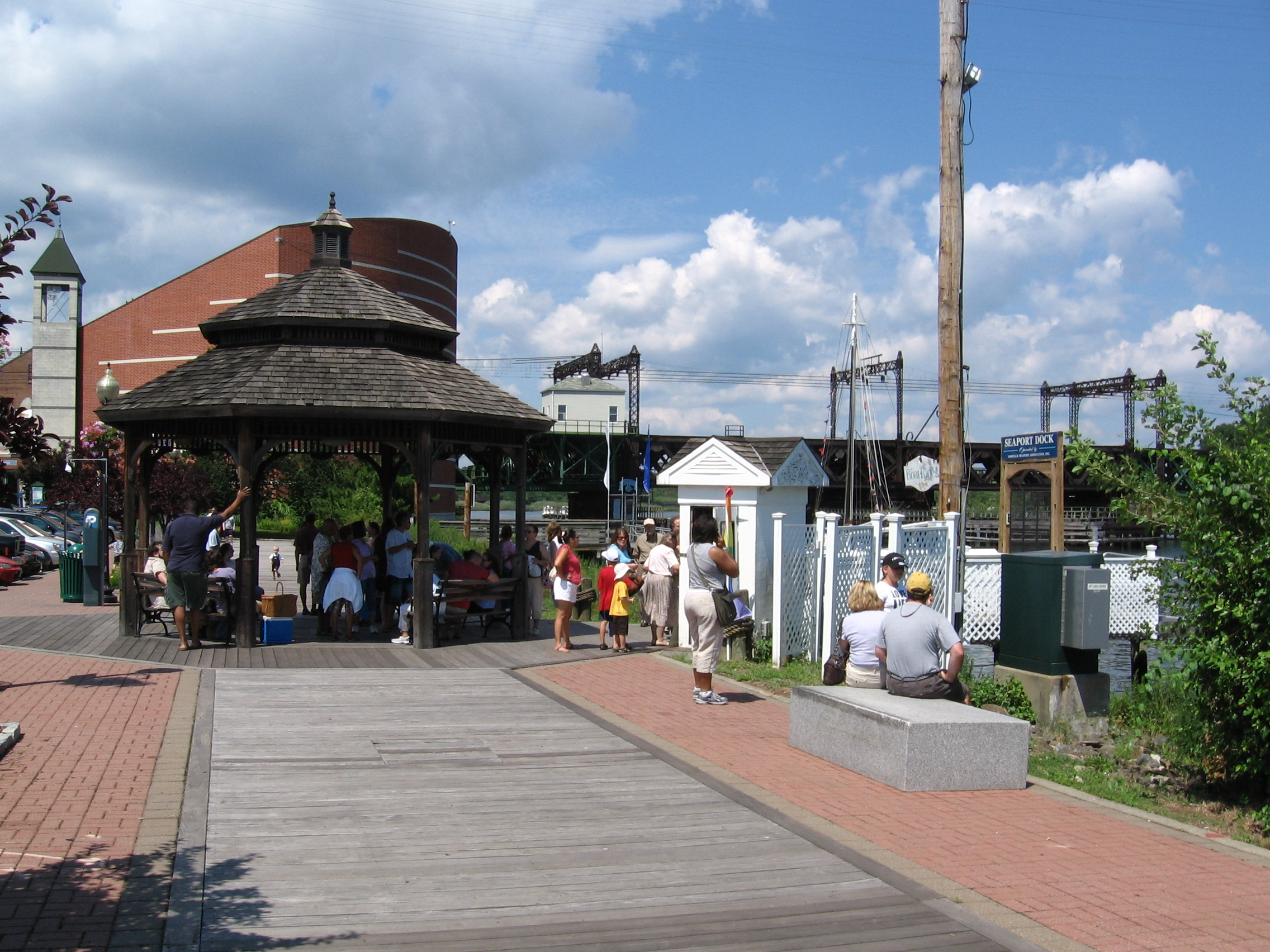
Waiting area for harbor tours, riverside, South Norwalk.

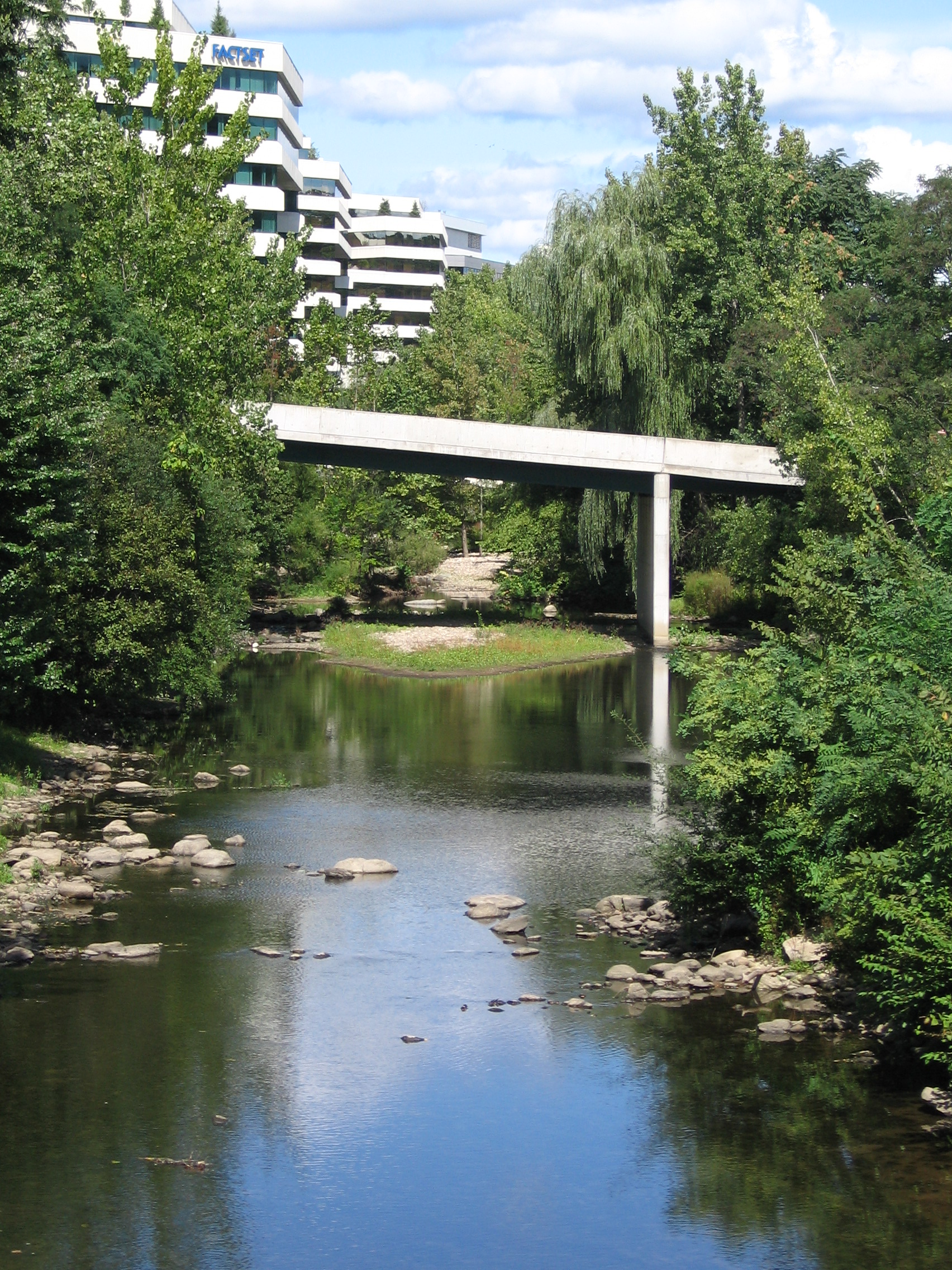
The river passes by numerous office buildings in Northern Norwalk.

== See also ==
- List of rivers of Connecticut
