= Wilton, Connecticut =

Town in Connecticut, United States

- Town
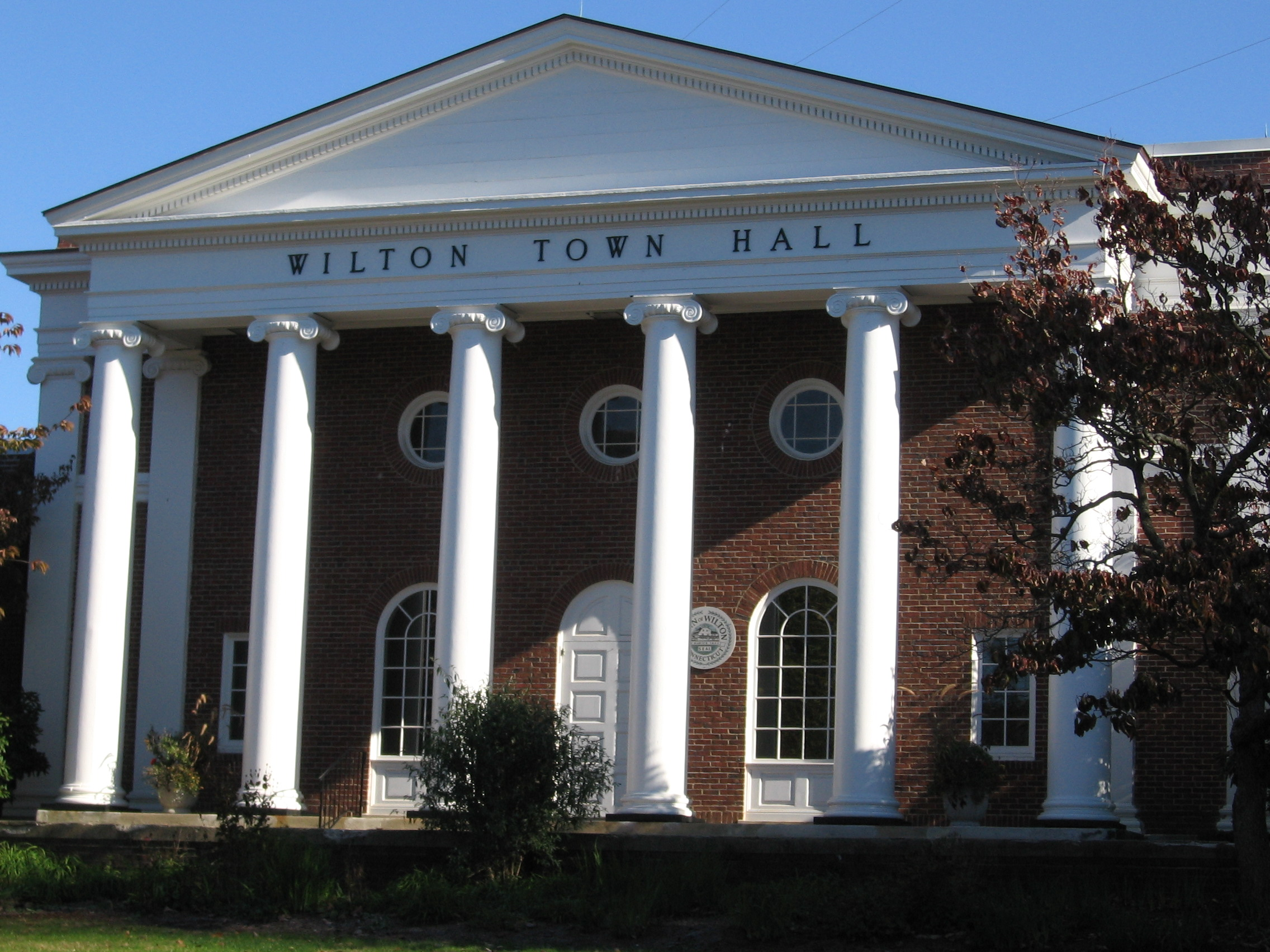

- Seal

- Coordinates: 41°12′N 73°26′W
- Country: United States
- U.S. state: Connecticut
- County: Fairfield
- Region: Western CT
- Incorporated: 1802

Government
  - Type: Selectman-town meeting
  - First selectman: Toni Boucher (R)
  - Selectmen: Rich McCarty (D); Matthew Raimondi (R); Ross Tartell (D); David Tatkow (D)

Area
  - Total: 27.4 sq mi (71.0 km^{2})
  - Land: 26.9 sq mi (69.8 km^{2})
  - Water: 0.42 sq mi (1.1 km^{2})
- Elevation: 335 ft (102 m)

Population (2020)
  - Total: 18,503
  - Density: 687/sq mi (265/km^{2})
- Time zone: UTC−5 (Eastern)
  - Summer (DST): UTC−4 (Eastern)
- ZIP Code: 06897
- Area codes: 203/475
- FIPS code: 09-86370
- GNIS feature ID: 0213535
- Website: www.wiltonct.org

Wilton is a town in Fairfield County, Connecticut, United States. As of the 2020 census, the town population was 18,503. The town is part of the Western Connecticut Planning Region.

Officially recognized as a parish in 1726, Wilton is a residential community with open lands, historic architecture such as the Round House, and many colonial homes. Many residents commute to nearby cities such as Stamford or New York City.

Wilton has offices for ASML, Breitling SA, Cannondale Bicycle Corporation, Melissa & Doug, and formerly Deloitte. The headquarters of AIG Financial Products, whose collapse played a role in the 2008 financial crisis, is located in Wilton.

The transformation from a small farming town to a suburban residential community has been controlled by zoning, efforts to preserve the town's colonial landmarks, and the reservation of almost 1,000 acres (400 ha) of open space for active and passive recreational use. The Cannondale Historic District, in north-central Wilton, retains its historic character and is listed on the National Register of Historic Places.

== History ==
=== Colonial days ===
The first written records of the areas that are now Wilton date back to 1640, when Roger Ludlow and his friends purchased land from the Indians between the Norwalk and Saugatuck Rivers and "a day's walk into the country." This land was called Norwalk.

The first settlers, called the Proprietors, arrived in Norwalk in 1651 and owned 50,000 acres (200 km^{2}) in common. On the outskirts of Norwalk's settled area, the Proprietors were allowed private ownership of land in a common planting field, but cattle, sheep, and hogs were grazed in a communal pasture area. The outer limit of this pasture approximates Wilton's present southern boundary.

By the end of the 17th century, the Norwalk Proprietors began to sell off the northern lands for settlement. The first non-Indian settlements in what is now Wilton were in the fertile lands of the Norwalk River valley, and on the ridges of Belden Hill, Chestnut Hill, and Ridgefield Road. In order to till the lands, the settlers had to clear the forests and remove hundreds of glacial rocks, which became the stone boundary walls that are treasured today.

The families who bought land in Wilton did not have their own church and were required to attend service in Norwalk each Sunday. When demand for Wilton lands increased in the early 18th century, the Proprietors realized that the land would be worth more if Wilton settlers did not have to make such a long trek each week.

By 1725 there were forty families living in Wilton who wanted their own Congregational church and were allowed by Norwalk to hire a minister (Robert Sturgeon, who also became the town's first schoolmaster), open schools and build roads. Therefore, in 1726, with the approval of both the Proprietors and the Wilton settlers, a petition to the General Court in Hartford created Wilton Parish, "a village enjoying parish privileges" but still part of the town of Norwalk. A copy of the petition is framed and on display in the Town Hall. (See also: Benjamin Hickox)

The Wilton Parish, organized as an ecclesiastical society, dealt with many problems of a secular nature as well. It dealt with such things as communal flocks, pounds for animals, and the regulation of the trades and taverns. The state of the roads was a constant source of comment in the society meeting, as was the inevitable subject of taxation. Although the village parish did not have the right to send a representative to the state legislature, it did have complete charge of both local education and military training. The first minister, Mr. Robert Sturgeon, was also Wilton's first schoolmaster.

As soon as the first meetinghouse was built in 1726, Wilton had a "center" of town, although other areas such as Belden Hill, Drum Hill, Pimpewaug and Chestnut Hill had already been settled by self-sufficient farmers. By 1738 the first meetinghouse had become too small, and a second was built on the corner of Sharp Hill Road. Less than sixty years later, this second meeting house had fallen into such disrepair that a third church was built in 1790 on Ridgefield Road where it still stands as the oldest church building in Fairfield County, Connecticut.

=== Revolutionary War ===
During the Revolutionary War, more than 300 men from Wilton served in some military unit. Among them was an African American named Cato Treadwell (1762–1849), who served three years in the 2nd Brigade of the Connecticut Line. In 1777, British forces passed through Wilton after raiding nearby Danbury. Several homes were burned along Ridgefield, Belden, Danbury, and Dudley roads, but the town remained intact. About 52 Revolutionary veteran graves are still identifiable in Wilton cemeteries.

=== 19th century ===
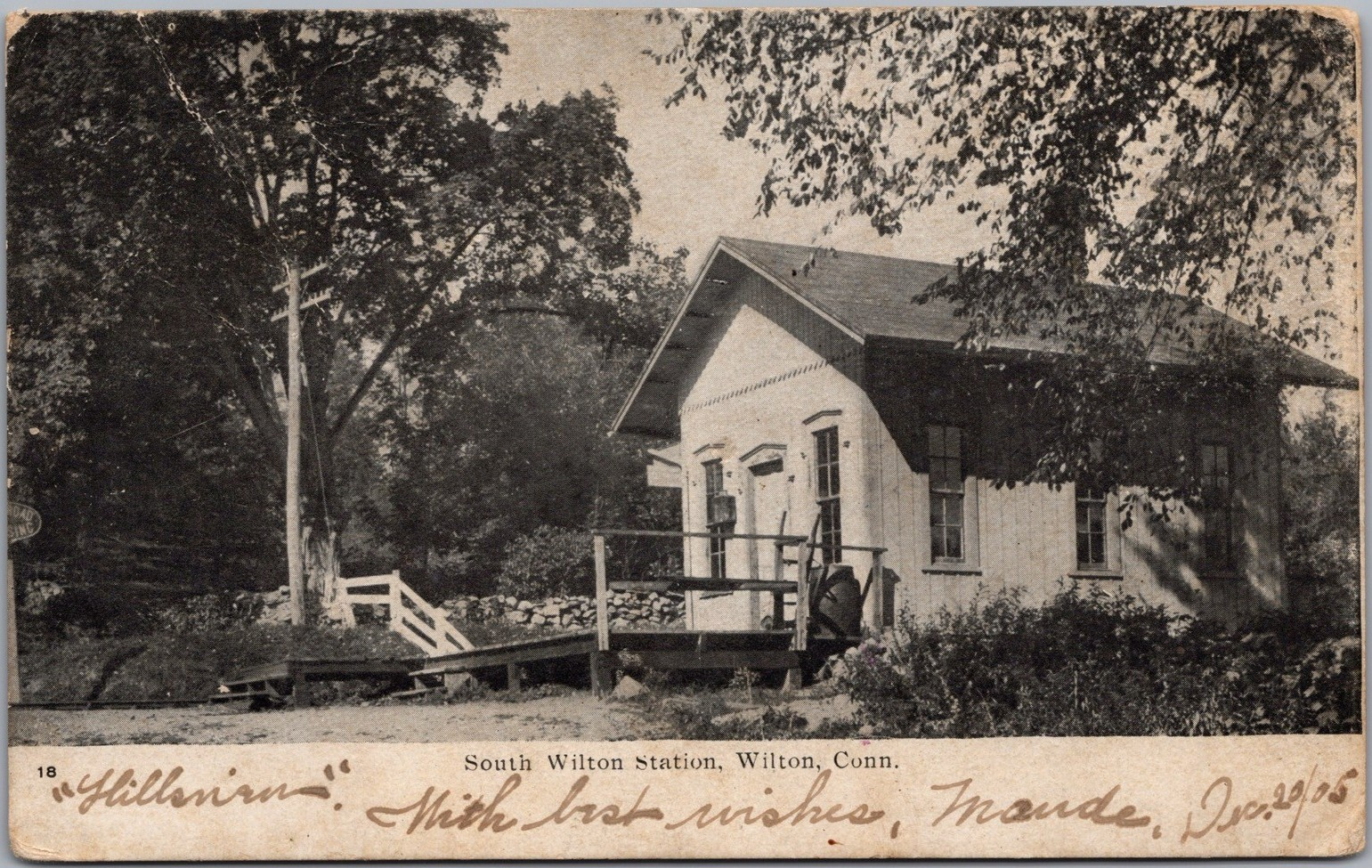
1900s postcard of South Wilton station

In 1802, despite Norwalk's objections, the people of Wilton sought and were granted separate Town government status by an act of the Connecticut General Assembly and became a political entity independent from Norwalk. The town chose the traditional New England Town Meeting-Selectmen form of government, which has been retained to this day.

In the 19th century, education became the responsibility of the school societies of nine separate school districts in Wilton. In addition, many Wilton children and those of well-to-do families of Norwalk and Stamford attended five private schools and academies in Wilton.

Wilton's population grew slowly from 1,728 in 1810 to 2,208 in 1860. Most of the land was farmland used for dairy herds, horses, or marketable crops. Farmers found their yield from the rocky soil to be very low at the same time that midwestern produce, made readily available by the railroads, began to compete with homegrown products, home industry expanded.

Industries such as shoemaking, shirt making, carriage building, and distilleries were common. Mills of various types were built along the streams and the Gilbert and Bennett Manufacturing Co. began producing wire sieves in 1834.

=== Civil War ===
Before the Civil War, the anti-slavery movement was strong in town. Wilton served as one of the stops on the Underground Railroad, a loosely organized escape route to Canada for runaway slaves, primarily at the house of William Wakeman, "an earnest abolitionist and undergrounder for many years." The Civil War itself had little impact on Wilton, although local businesses profited from wartime spending.

=== Industrial age ===
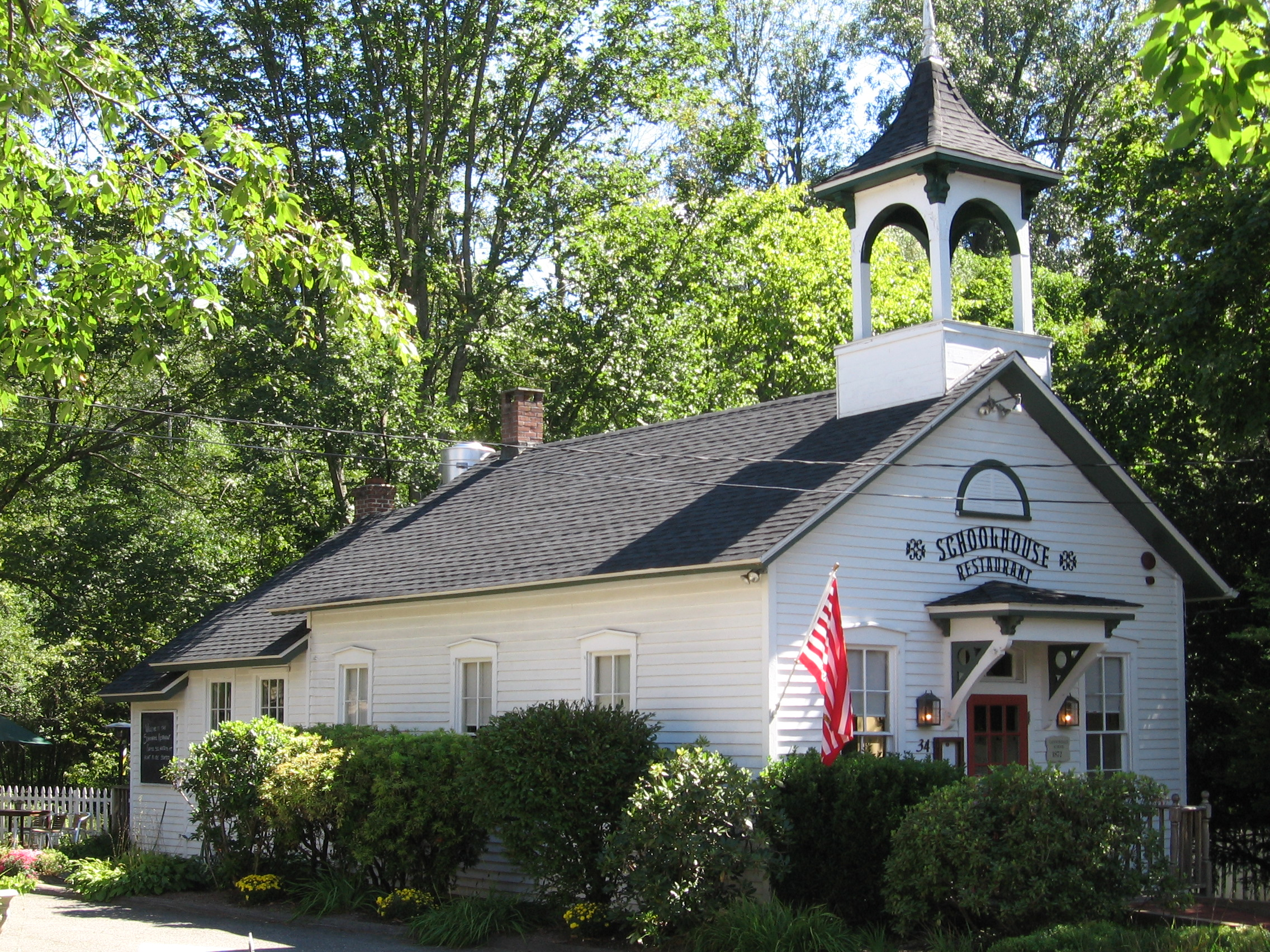
Cannondale School building (1872), now a restaurant

The coming of the railroad in 1852 brought few advantages to a community of home industry and farming, but offered easy access to bountiful western lands.

After the Civil War, Wilton's population declined as cities grew, industrialization increased, the market for home products dropped, and farms were abandoned. Its population declined by some 30% between 1860 and 1900. By 1900, the census showed only 1,598 people living in Wilton.

This depopulation enabled many 18th- and 19th-century homes to escape demolition and suburban development. Beginning in the 1910s, abandoned farms were discovered by New Yorkers for summer homes and in the 1930s, there were noticeable stresses at Town Meetings between the "old-timers" and the "new people." The community was changing from agricultural to one of commuters. By 1935, the last two of Wilton's nine schoolhouses—Belden Hill and Hurlbutt Street—had closed. The original nine school districts are consolidated into the Center school in Wilton Center.

Originating in its colonial origins, Wilton had developed in a rather haphazard, individualistic way: a house here and a store there. Shortly after World War II, a new phenomenon brought a new look to Wilton's landscape: the builder subdivision.

Light industry began moving into town. To plan for orderly growth, town zoning was adopted. With the growth in population and businesses came the corresponding need for new schools, new roads, executive offices, and more support services. The period of greatest growth was from 1950 to 1970, when the population grew from 4,558 to 13,572.

=== Dry to damp ===
Wilton was classified as a "dry" town until 1993, when the local ordinance was altered to permit the sale of alcoholic beverages in restaurants. The town was then referred to as "damp." On November 5, 2009, a referendum proposal was passed to allow liquor stores.

=== Wilton deaths on September 11, 2001 ===
On September 11, 2001, four town residents died in the terrorist attack on the World Trade Center: Edward T. Fergus Jr., 40; Peter Christian Fry, 36; John Iskyan, 41; and Edward P. York, 45. Wilton High School graduate John Henwood, 35, also died in the attack.

== Geography ==
According to the United States Census Bureau, the town has a total area of 27.4 square miles (71 km^{2}), of which 27.0 square miles (70 km^{2}) is land and 0.4 square miles (1.0 km^{2}), or 1.50%, is water, including the South Norwalk Reservoir. Wilton is bordered by Ridgefield to the northwest, Norwalk to the south, New Canaan to the southwest, Westport to the southeast, and Weston and Redding to the northeast. It is also bordered on the west by the hamlet of Vista in Lewisboro, Westchester County, New York.

=== Housing and land use ===
Wilton has about 500 surviving 18th- and 19th-century homes. In 2005, Marilyn Gould, the director of the Wilton Historical Society said:

People aren't taking down historic houses but the more modest homes that were built in the '50s and '60s.... What that's doing is changing the affordability of the town and the demographic of the town. Wilton used to have a wide demographic of people who worked with their hands—artisans, builders, mechanics. Now it's management and upper management.

Between 1999 and 2005, the town's voters endorsed spending $23 million through municipal bonds to preserve land.

South Norwalk Electric and Water (SNEW) has a reservoir on the western side of town with about 350 acres (1.4 km^{2}) of land, along with another 25 acres (100,000 m^{2}) adjacent in New Canaan. In the fall, hunters with bows and arrows—no more than 10 at a time—are allowed to hunt deer on the Wilton property, in order to keep down the number of deer in the area.

Wilton town center contains several local restaurants, boutiques, retail stores. These stores were added around 2000 next to the old Wilton Center, which consists of the Wilton Library, the Wilton Post Office, the Old Post Office Square, and the Village Market. In the southern part of town, US 7 contains a business district.

Recent nature access developments in town include the expansion of the Norwalk River Valley Trail, a multi-use trail designed to run between Norwalk and Danbury.

=== Neighborhoods ===
The southwestern corner of town includes part of the Silvermine neighborhood (which also extends into New Canaan and Norwalk). Georgetown, which is primarily within the town but also extends into Redding and partly into Weston, is in the northeastern corner of town. Other neighborhoods in town are South Wilton, Wilton Center, Gilbert Corners, Cannondale, and North Wilton.

== Demographics ==
Historical population
Census	Pop.	Note	%±
1820	1,818		—
1850	2,066		—
1860	2,208		6.9%
1870	1,994		−9.7%
1880	1,864		−6.5%
1890	1,722		−7.6%
1900	1,598		−7.2%
1910	1,706		6.8%
1920	1,284		−24.7%
1930	2,133		66.1%
1940	2,829		32.6%
1950	4,558		61.1%
1960	8,026		76.1%
1970	13,572		69.1%
1980	15,351		13.1%
1990	15,989		4.2%
2000	17,633		10.3%
2010	18,062		2.4%
2020	18,503		2.4%
U.S. Decennial Census

As of the census of 2000, there were 17,633 people, 5,923 households, and 4,874 families residing in Wilton. The population density was 654.3 inhabitants per square mile (252.6/km^{2}). There were 6,113 housing units at an average density of 226.8 per square mile (87.6/km^{2}). The racial makeup of the town was 95.55% White, 0.60% African American, 0.09% Native American, 2.69% Asian, 0.01% Pacific Islander, 0.27% from other races, and 0.79% from two or more races. Hispanic or Latino of any race were 1.53% of the population.

There were 5,923 households, out of which 46.6% had children under the age of 18 living with them, 75.4% were married couples living together, 5.4% had a female householder with no husband present, and 17.7% were non-families. Of all households 15.3% were made up of individuals, and 6.6% had someone living alone who was 65 years of age or older. The average household size was 2.91 and the average family size was 3.25.

The age distribution is 31.5% under the age of 18, 2.8% from 18 to 24, 25.6% from 25 to 44, 27.9% from 45 to 64, and 12.2% who were 65 years of age or older. The median age was 40 years. For every 100 females, there were 93.9 males. For every 100 females age 18 and over, there were 86.2 males.

The median income for a household in the town was $197,428, and the median income for a family was $217,415. Males had a median income of $190,000 versus $71,611 for females. The per capita income for the town was $65,806. About 1.3% of families and 2.9% of the population were below the poverty line, including 1.7% of those under age 18 and 6.6% of those age 65 or over.

== Arts and culture ==
=== Events ===
- Relay For Life
- Wilton Singers Holiday Feast - traditional holiday performance, usually first weekend in December, featuring the Wilton Singers and the Wilton High School Madrigal Singers.
- Jazz in the Garden takes place at Weir Farm every September.
- Wilton Rocks for Food is an annual concert by Wilton-based musicians who send all the proceeds to the Wilton Food Pantry and the Connecticut Food bank.
- Wilton's annual Street Fair and Sidewalk Sale is an outdoor sales event in the town center that occurs in the summer.

=== Listings on the National Register of Historic Places ===
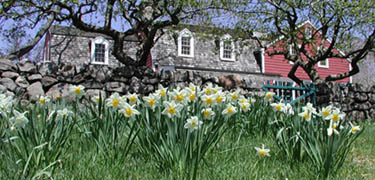
Weir Farm National Historic Site in Wilton

- Cannondale Historic District
- David Lambert House
- Georgetown Historic District
- Hurlbutt Street School
- Marvin Tavern
- Sloan-Raymond-Fitch House
- Weir Farm National Historic Site
- Wilton Center Historic District

== Parks and recreation ==
The Wilton Parks and Recreation Department offers a number of programs for all ages including pre-school programs, senior programs youth soccer and basketball. There are also many walking paths including part of the Norwalk River Valley Trail. Merwin Meadows is a picnic area for families with a pond, playground and athletic field.

== Government ==
Wilton town vote by party in presidential elections
Year	Democratic	Republican	Third Parties
2024	64.42% 7,054	33.69% 3,689	1.89% 207
2020	65.59% 7,676	32.63% 3,819	1.86% 218
2016	58.27% 6,055	36.44% 3,786	5.29% 550
2012	45.37% 4,589	53.62% 5,424	1.01% 102
2008	53.41% 5,569	46.04% 4,801	0.55% 57
2004	46.57% 4,823	52.35% 5,422	1.08% 112
2000	41.90% 4,086	54.52% 5,316	3.58% 349
1996	38.75% 3,451	54.55% 4,859	6.70% 597
1992	33.95% 3,402	51.32% 5,143	14.74% 1,477
1988	31.85% 2,964	67.51% 6,283	0.64% 60
1984	27.23% 2,462	72.46% 6,553	0.31% 28
1980	23.73% 1,117	59.91% 2,820	16.36% 770
1976	31.63% 2,566	67.95% 5,513	0.42% 34
1972	31.38% 2,378	67.63% 5,124	0.99% 75
1968	32.69% 1,995	64.85% 3,957	2.46% 150
1964	52.58% 2,553	47.42% 2,302	0.00% 0
1960	26.10% 1,121	73.90% 3,174	0.00% 0
1956	18.19% 612	81.81% 2,753	0.00% 0
1952	20.78% 598	79.04% 2,274	0.18% 5
1948	16.68% 352	78.59% 1,659	4.73% 100
1944	28.47% 505	71.53% 1,269	0.00% 0
1940	25.95% 424	74.05% 1,210	0.00% 0
1936	33.42% 428	66.58% 853	0.00% 0
1932	29.69% 307	70.31% 727	0.00% 0
1928	21.77% 185	85.53% 659	0.70% 6
1924	21.15% 143	73.82% 499	5.03% 34
1920	23.62% 133	72.82% 410	3.56% 20
1916	40.98% 150	58.75% 215	0.27% 1
1912	28.92% 96	50.00% 166	21.08% 70
1908	25.94% 90	73.48% 255	0.58% 2
1904	32.47% 113	67.24% 234	0.29% 1
1900	36.51% 138	62.44% 236	1.05% 4
1896	26.36% 102	71.32% 276	2.32% 9
1892	45.66% 184	51.36% 207	2.98% 12
1888	45.74% 188	51.83% 213	2.43% 10
1884	51.11% 206	48.89% 197	0.00% 0
1880	46.87% 210	53.13% 238	0.00% 0
1876	48.50% 226	51.50% 240	0.00% 0
1872	49.75% 192	50.25% 195	0.00% 0
1868	46.53% 188	53.47% 216	0.00% 0
1864	39.16% 148	60.84% 230	0.00% 0
1860	8.76% 31	66.94% 237	24.30% 86
1856	36.10% 135	63.90% 239	0.00% 0
1852	43.09% 131	56.91% 173	0.00% 0
1848	32.66% 113	63.88% 221	3.46% 12
1844	40.15% 153	59.85% 228	0.00% 0
1840	36.28% 119	63.72% 209	0.00% 0
1836	41.67% 70	58.33% 98	0.00% 0
1832	24.61% 47	74.87% 143	0.52% 1
1828	8.57% 9	91.43% 96	0.00% 0

Once a Republican bastion, Wilton has become increasingly Democratic in recent years. In 2008, Wilton voted for Barack Obama, who became the first Democratic candidate for U.S. President to carry the town since Lyndon B. Johnson in 1964. The town flipped back in 2012, voting for Mitt Romney, a former governor of neighboring Massachusetts. In 2016, voters in Wilton delivered a 22-point margin of victory to Hillary Clinton, the best performance for a Democratic presidential nominee in the town since Johnson in 1964. In 2019 and 2021, Republicans won the majority of local offices. In 2020, the town gave a 33-point margin to Joe Biden.

Wilton is a part of the 26th Senate District, represented by Ceci Maher. Wilton is also a part of the 42nd House District, currently represented by Keith B. Denning.

Since 2023, Wilton has been led by First Selectwoman Toni Boucher, a Republican serving her first four-year term after running unopposed. Boucher has long been involved in area politics, representing the 26th district in the state senate from 2009 to 2019.

Voter registration and party enrollment as of October 31, 2023
Party	Active voters	Inactive voters	Total voters	Percentage
Democratic	4,198	472	4,661	33.84%
Republican	3,086	305	3,391	24.61%
Unaffiliated	4,978	560	5,538	40.20%
Minor parties	172	15	187	1.35%
Total	12,425	1,352	13,777	100%

== Education ==
=== Public schools ===
The school district is the Wilton School District.

A total of about 3,750 students attend the town's four public schools: two elementary schools, Miller-Driscoll School (Grades Pre-K–2) and Cider Mill School (3–5); one middle school, Middlebrook School (6–8); and one high school, Wilton High School.

=== Private schools ===
- Seven Acres Montessori School, preschool through eighth grade

== Media ==
- The Wilton Bulletin, a weekly newspaper.
- GOOD Morning Wilton, an online daily news website.

== Infrastructure ==
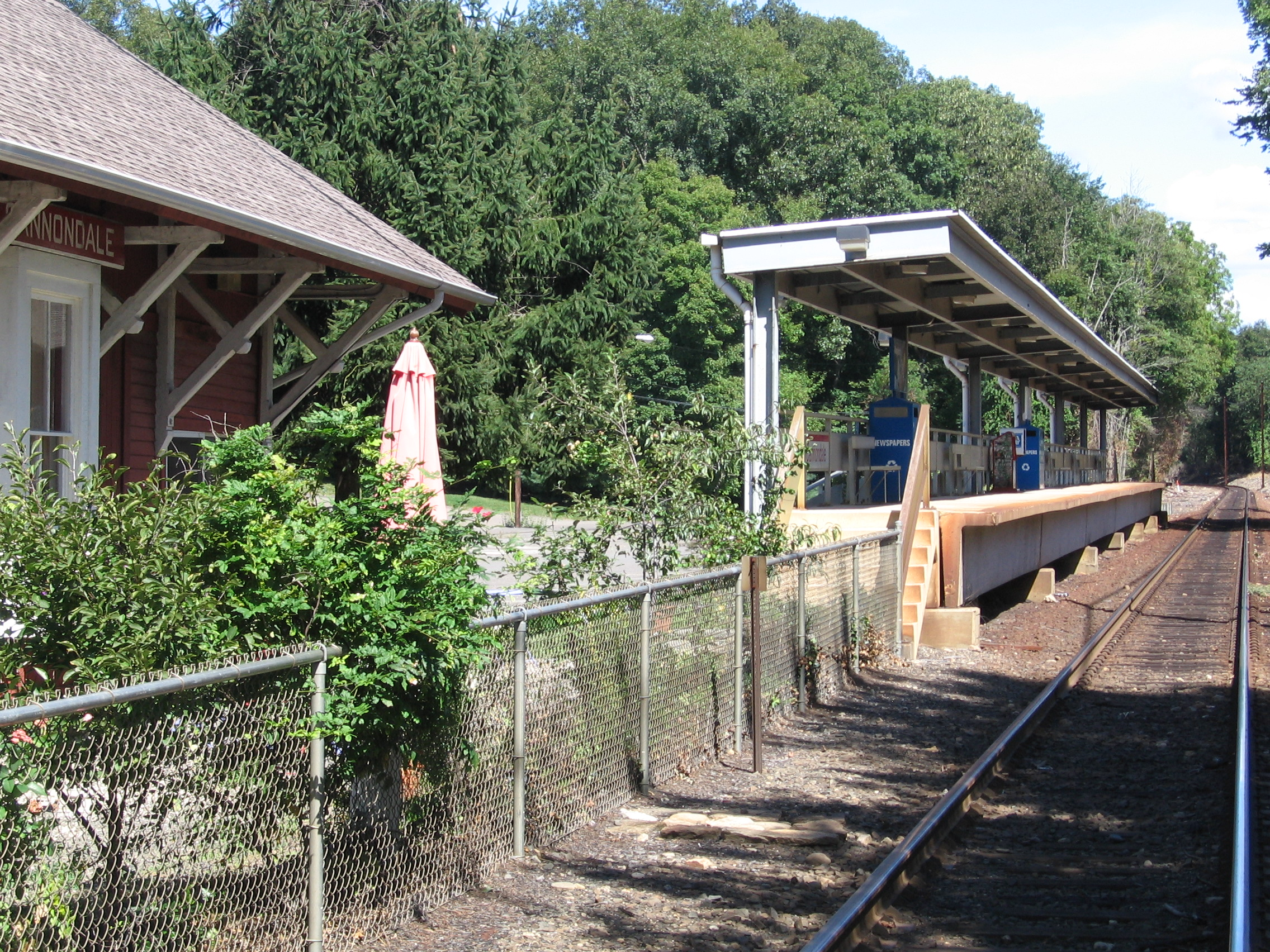
Cannondale station

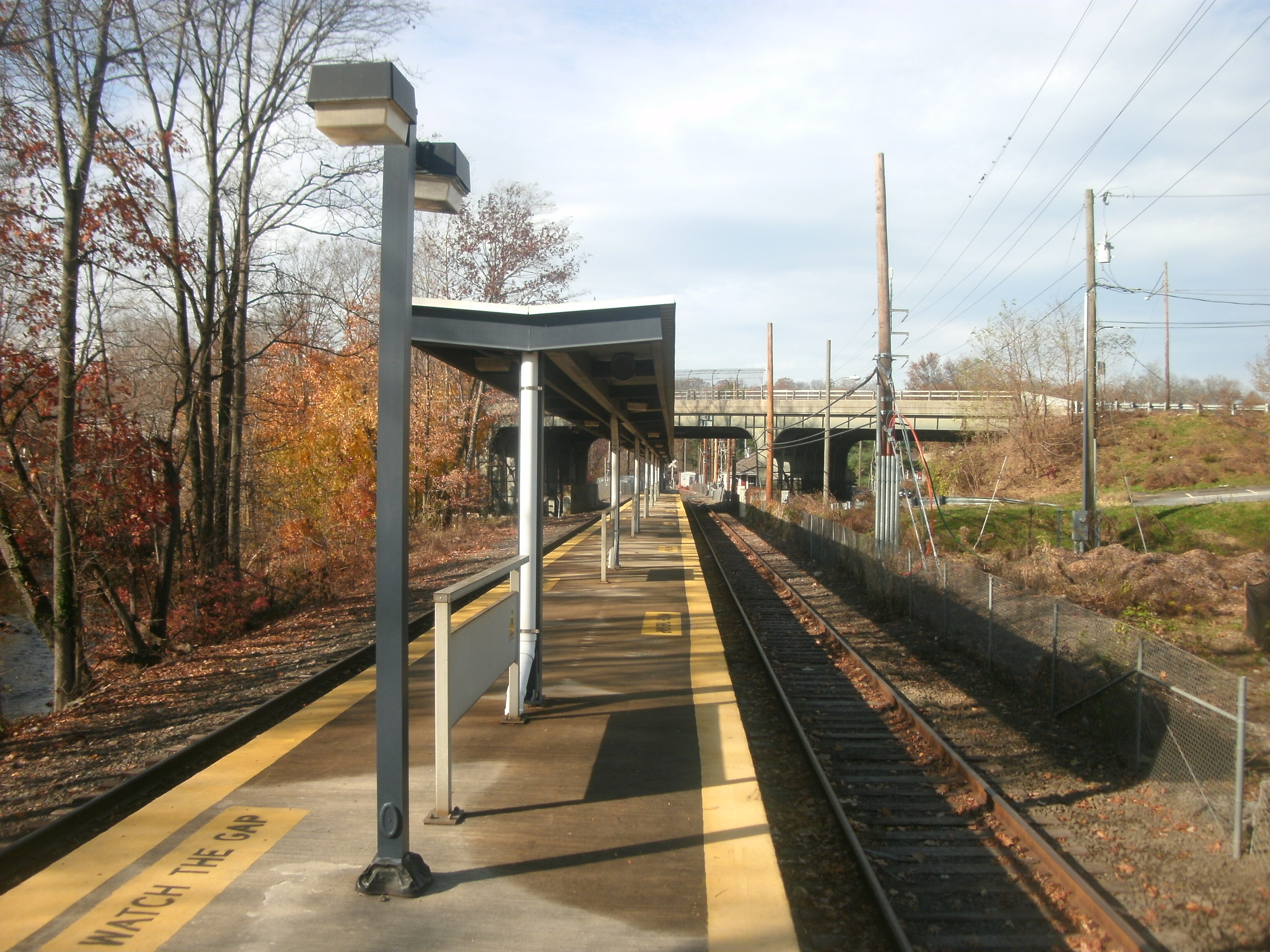
Wilton station

Wilton has two stations on Metro-North Railroad's Danbury Branch

=== Transportation ===
==== Highways ====
- U.S. Route 7
- Route 33
- Route 53
- Route 106

==== Railroad ====
Railroad stations include Wilton and Cannondale, both served by Metro-North Railroad's Danbury Branch. Historic stations include South Wilton (1852–1971), Kent Road (1976–1994), and Georgetown station (1852–1970).

==== Buses ====
The town is served by the 7 Link bus route of the Norwalk Transit District that runs between Norwalk and Danbury along the Route 7 corridor. A commuter shuttle bus during rush hours is available between South Wilton and the South Norwalk railroad station on the New Haven Line.

== Notable people ==
- Nico Benalcazar (born 2001), soccer player
- Theodore Bikel (1924–2015), actor, long-time resident
- Jeremy Black, actor
- Linda Blair, actress
- Chance Browne, cartoonist of syndicated comic strip Hi and Lois
- Dik Browne (1917–1989), cartoonist, creator of Hägar the Horrible and Hi and Lois
- Dave Brubeck, prominent jazz musician
- David Canary (1938–2015), actor, All My Children and Bonanza
- Paul Dano, actor, 2002 graduate of Wilton High School
- Ray Dalio, founder of Bridgewater Associates, richest person in Connecticut, resident in late 20th century
- Matt Davies, Pulitzer Prize-winning political cartoonist
- George Devol, inventor, engineer and manager, founder of first industrial robotics company Unimation.
- Abby Elliott, actress/comedian, daughter of Chris Elliott
- Chris Elliott, actor/comedian
- Ace Frehley, guitarist for Kiss, lived in Wilton from 1979–1986
- Charles Grodin (1935–2021), actor
- Johnny Gruelle, artist who created Raggedy Ann and Raggedy Andy
- June Havoc, actress, who also renovated buildings to create the Cannon Crossing center of small shops. Her sister Gypsy Rose Lee frequently visited her
- Daryl Hawk, documentary photographer, explorer
- Sterling Hayden, actor
- Henry Hazlitt, economics columnist, author, Wilton resident c. 1960s-1980s
- Patty Hearst, known as Patricia Hearst-Shaw, heiress, kidnapping victim, and actress
- Lydia Hearst-Shaw, supermodel and heiress
- Russell Hoban, writer; Lillian Hoban, writer and illustrator; and their daughter Phoebe Hoban, journalist and biographer
- Richard C. Hottelet, broadcast journalist and commentator, last of the Murrow's Boys
- Sam Hyde, comedian and a co-founder of the sketch comedy group Million Dollar Extreme (MDE)
- Ira Levin, writer, lived in Wilton in the 1960s and wrote in a March 27, 2007, letter to the New York Times that he based the fictional town of Stepford from his 1972 novel The Stepford Wives on Wilton
- Kristine Lilly, US Olympic Soccer Team, holds the world record for most professional soccer match appearances in history
- Katherine Maher, CEO of NPR
- Jay Manuel, America's Next Top Model director of photo shoots
- William Warder Norton, publisher
- Joe Pantoliano, actor
- Ingri and Edgar Parin d'Aulaire, writers and illustrators of children's books
- Aldo Parisot, cellist
- Dean Parisot, film and television director
- Sarah Phillips, fashion designer
- Steve Phillips, former NY Mets General Manager and former ESPN baseball analyst
- Charles E. Pont, artist and Baptist minister, lived here from 1958 until his death in 1971
- Jane Powell and Dickie Moore, actress and former child actor
- Randy Rasmussen, former left guard of the New York Jets for 15 years (1967–1981), started in Super Bowl III
- Vicki Sue Robinson, actress and singer
- John Scofield, grew up in Wilton, jazz guitarist
- Frank Sesno, journalist and professor
- Zachary Cole Smith, frontman of DIIV, went to elementary and middle school growing up in the town
- Carter Vail, content creator and musician, attended Wilton High School
- Donald B. Verrilli Jr., U.S. solicitor general from 2011 to 2016, graduated Wilton High School in 1975
- Christopher Walken, actor
- Marcy Walker, actress, lived in Wilton during the early 2000s
- Emily Weiss, founder of Glossier
- Cathie Wood, founder of ARK Investment Management
