= Hewlett =

Hewlett or Hewletts may refer to:

- Bill Hewlett, an American entrepreneur
- Hewlett (surname)
- Hewlett Johnson (1874-1966), English clergyman, Dean of Manchester and Dean of Canterbury
- Hewlett Thompson (born 1929), Anglican former Bishop of Exeter
- Hewlett, New York, a hamlet and census-designated place
- Hewletts Creek, a stream in North Carolina
- Hewlett House (Cold Spring Harbor, New York), on the National Register of Historic Places

== See also ==
- Hewlett-Packard, a technology corporation
