= James Hewlett =

James or Jamie Hewlett may refer to:

- James Hewlett (painter) (1768–1836), English flower painter
- James Hewlett (actor) (fl. 1821–1849), African-American Shakespearean actor
- James Monroe Hewlett (1868–1941), American Beaux Arts architect, scenic designer, and muralist
- Jamie Hewlett (born 1968), English artist, director, and songwriter
