= Silvermine, Connecticut =

Silvermine
- Unincorporated community
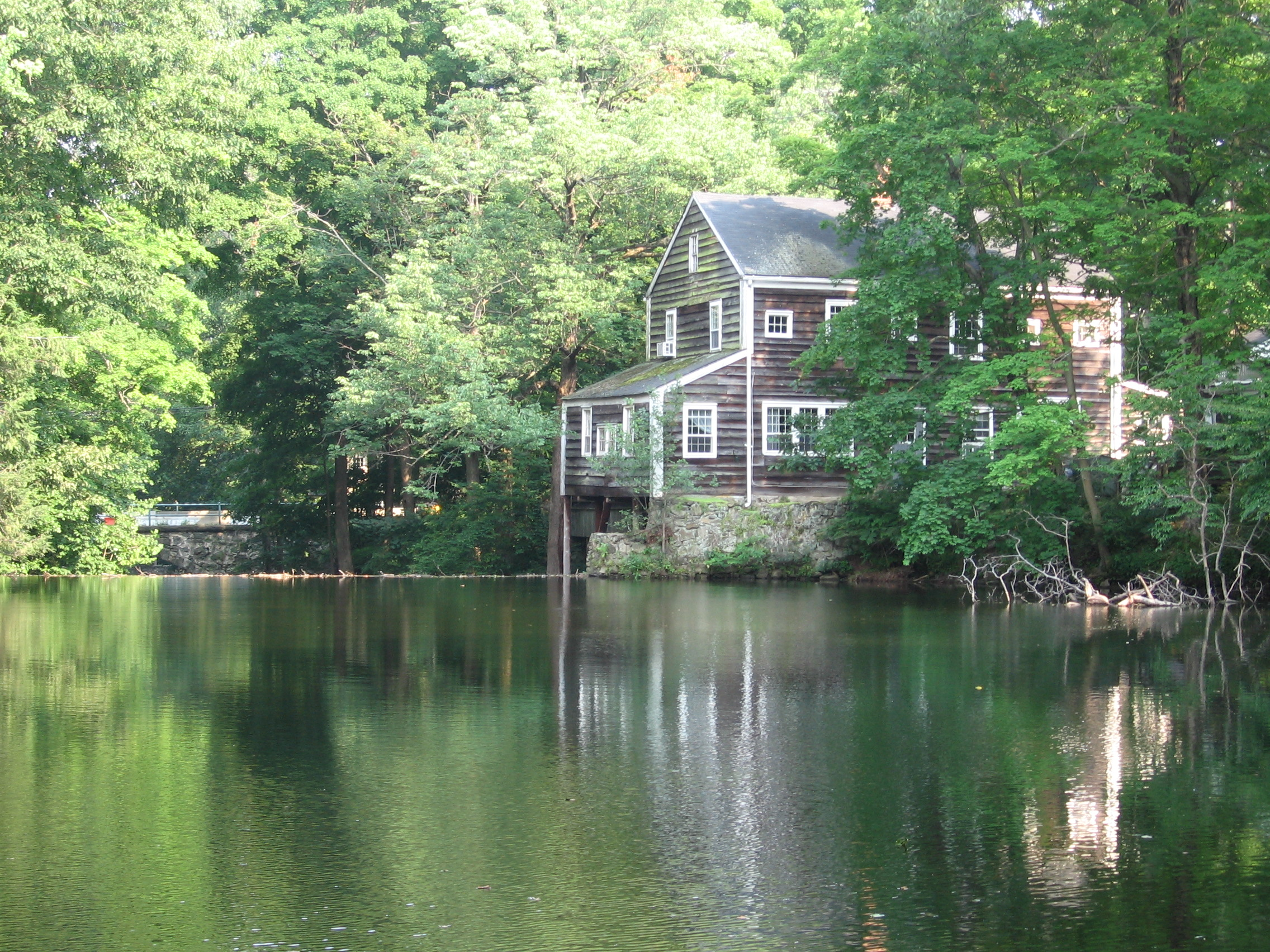
- Mill pond and grist mill at Silvermine Tavern

- Location within Connecticut Location within the United States
- Coordinates: 41°09′05″N 73°26′42″W
- Country: United States
- U.S. state: Connecticut
- County: Fairfield
- NECTA: Bridgeport-Stamford-Norwalk
- Region: Western CT
- City: Norwalk
- Elevation: 112 ft (34 m)
- Time zone: UTC-5 (Eastern)
  - Summer (DST): UTC-4 (Eastern)
- Area codes: 203/475
- GNIS feature ID: 210867

Silvermine is an unincorporated community in Fairfield County, Connecticut, United States that extends along the Silvermine River, across three southwestern Connecticut towns: Norwalk, New Canaan and Wilton.

The name "Silvermine" comes from old legends of a silver mine in the area, although no silver has ever been found. Silvermine, the nearest (50 miles) to New York City of the larger art colonies, remains the home of the Silvermine Guild Arts Center. The Silvermine Tavern, an inn occupying several historic buildings, also remains in the neighborhood. Silver Hill Hospital is just beyond the northern end of the neighborhood, in New Canaan near the Wilton border. There are two Silvermine community groups: The Silvermine Community Association and the Norwalk Association of Silvermine Homeowners.

== Settlement ==
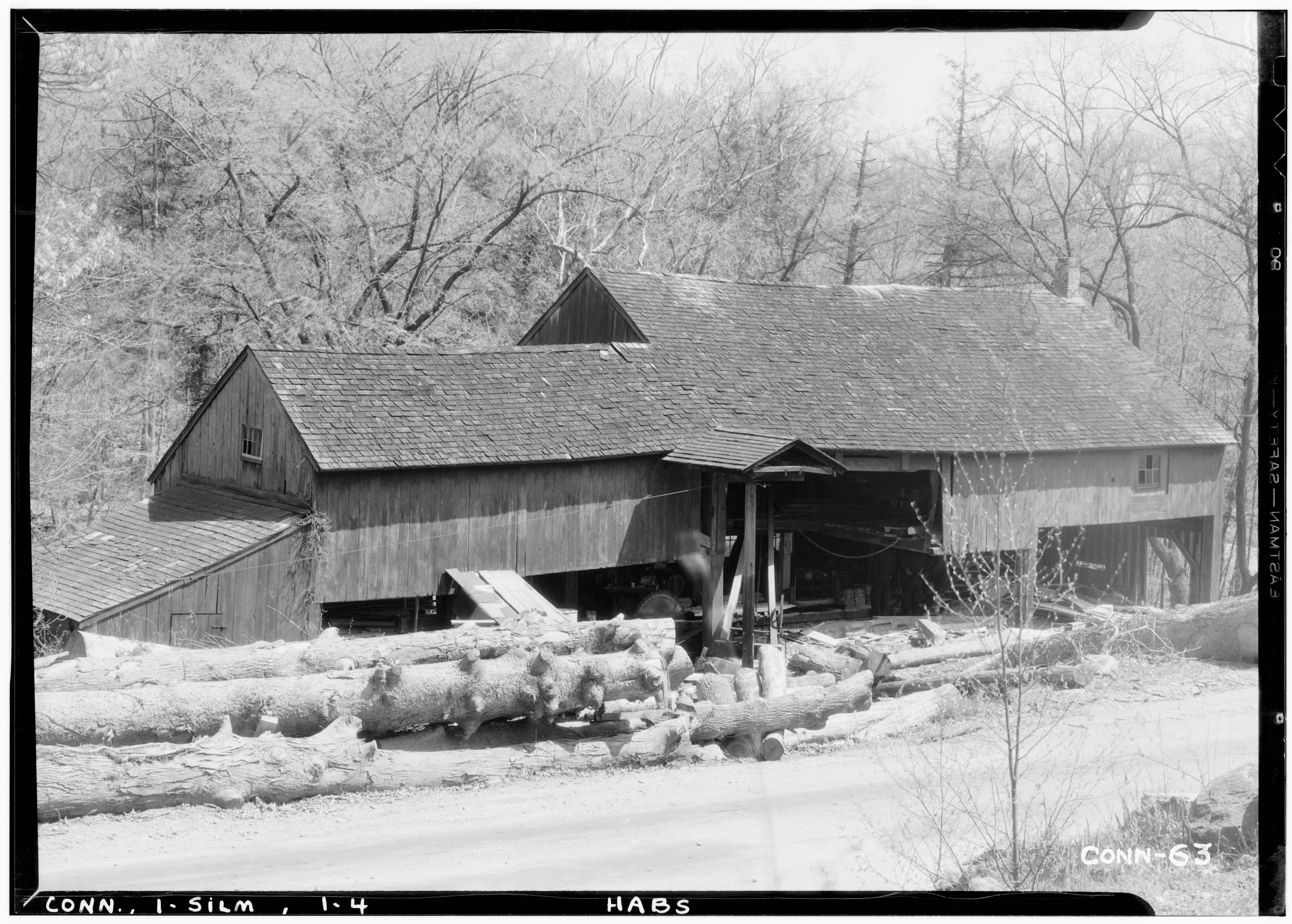
Buttery Sawmill (1672–1955), WEST, Silvermine, 27 April 1938

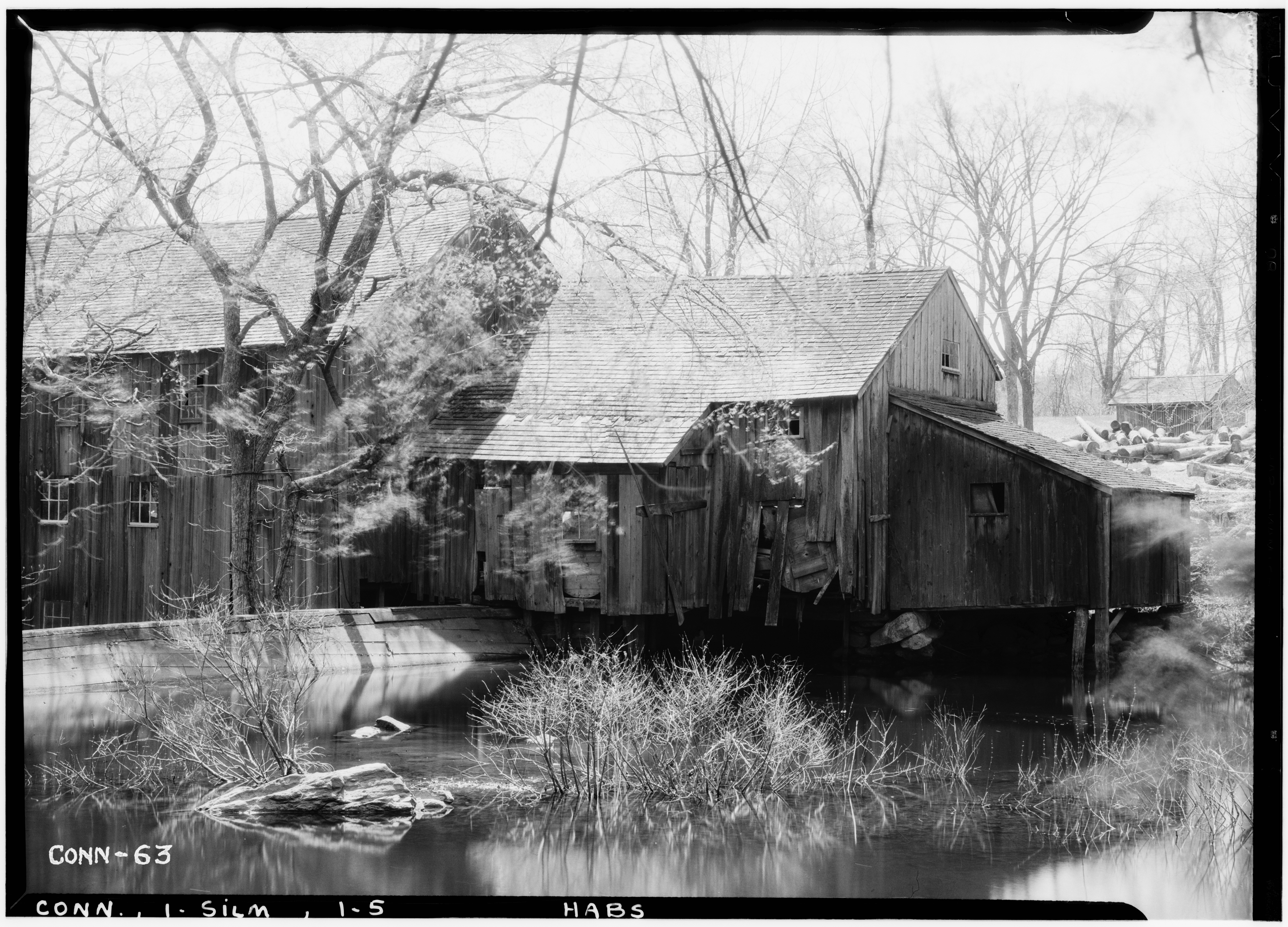
Buttery Sawmill, NORTH EAST, Silvermine, 27 April 1938, (in 1955, a “hundred-year-flood” undermined the mill)

Silvermine, once called Silver Mine, may have been well-settled by the late seventeenth century. In the eighteenth century, the Silvermine River was used for 12 or 13 mills in the neighborhood because it fell steeply enough for the water power to be profitably harnessed. The mills included a leather tanning works, sawmill, and spool works. First built in 1688 on the Silvermine River in Silvermine, Connecticut, the Buttery Sawmill burned down and was rebuilt in 1741.

== Perry Avenue Bridge ==
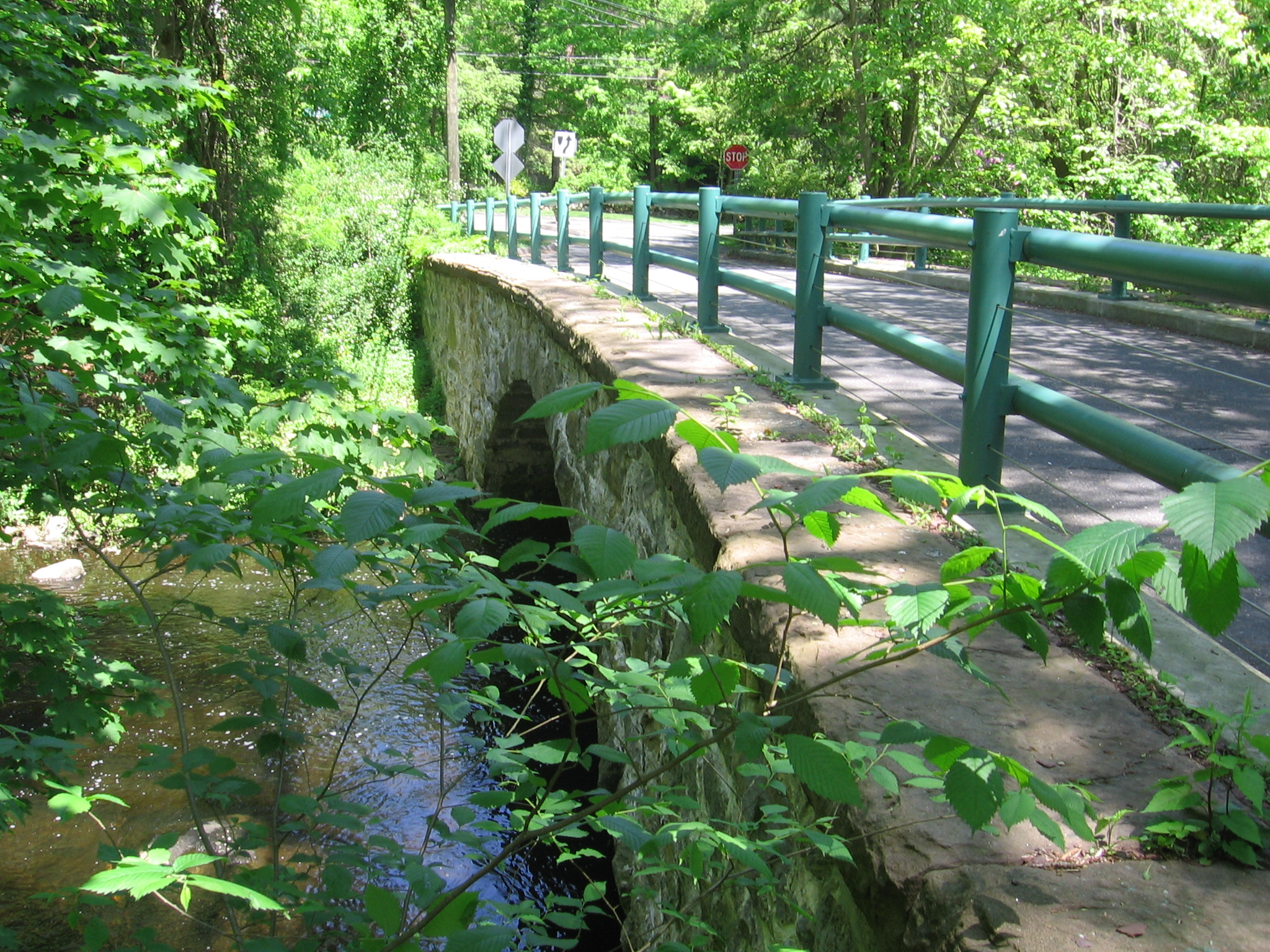
Perry Avenue Bridge, May 2012

In 1899, the present Perry Avenue Bridge was constructed. The one-lane stone bridge carries the road over Silvermine River near the Silvermine Tavern grist mill. In the flood of 1955, water flowed over the bridge. The span was put on the National Register of Historic Places in October 2006. That year one of the bridge's curbstones fell into the water, and for the six months before Memorial Day weekend in 2008 the span was closed as repairs were made. The bridge is so narrow that when at times when cars try to pass another, curbstones can be hit. The Norwalk city government spent $350,000 in repairs, which included masonry restoration, new railings, repaving and further narrowing so that drivers would not be tempted to try to pass. A parade with antique cars was held to celebrate the reopening of the bridge.

== Silvermine Art Guild ==
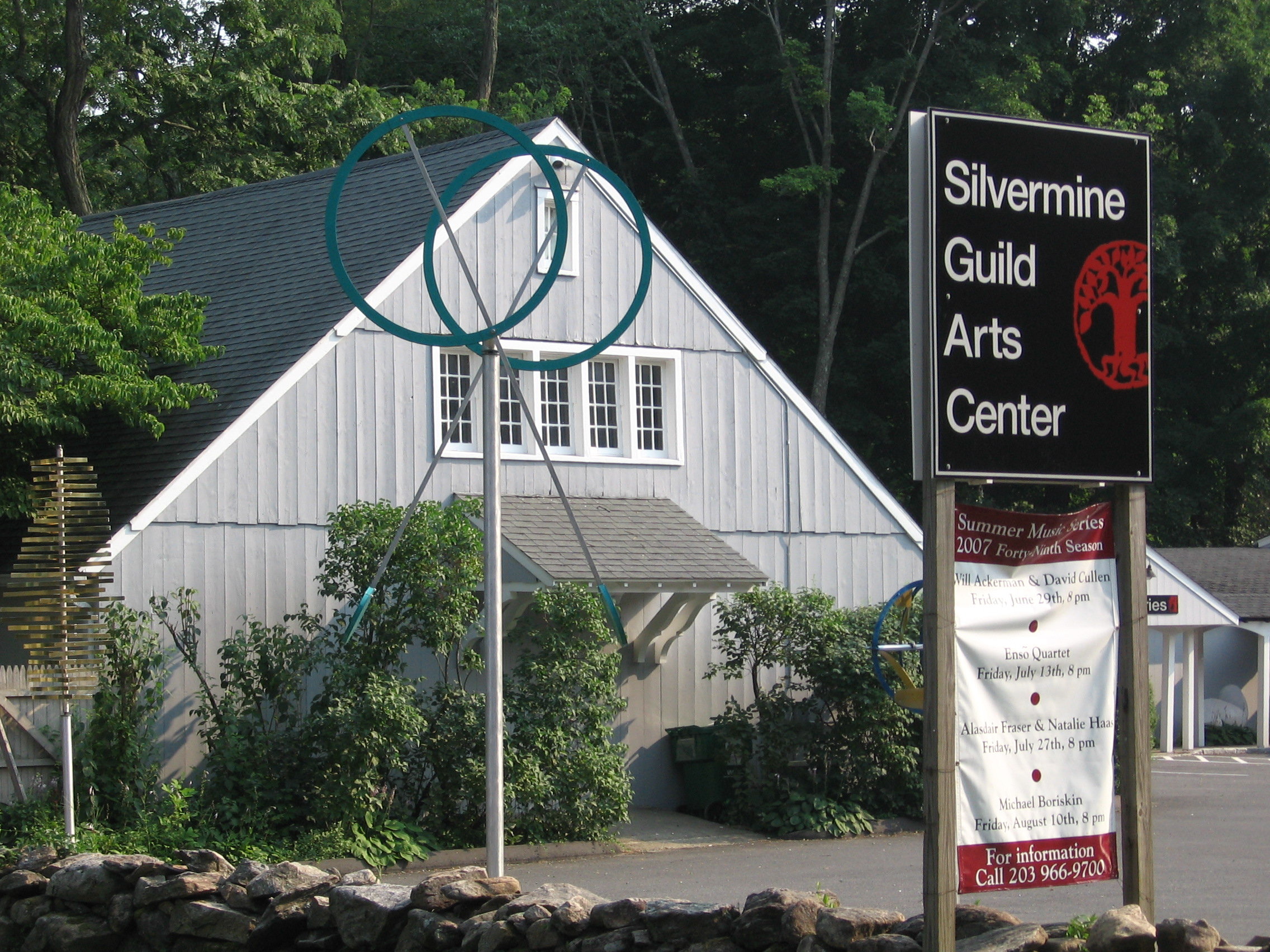
Silvermine Arts Center

In 1906, Solon Hannibal Borglum, a sculptor, moved to the New Canaan part of Silvermine and built a hillside studio. He was one of the leading figures in an emerging community of artists in the neighborhood and helped found the "Knockers Club", so named because when they would meet in Borglum's studio and discuss their art, a lot of frank criticism came out, knocking one another's work, they soon were known as The Silvermine Group of Artists.

In 1911, Frank Townsend Hutchens purchased The Old Mill House, The Guthrie-Hutchens Barn, The Blacksmith/Basket Shop, the White Mill (later called the original Village Room), and The Red Mill (Guthrie Knob Mill).

John Kenneth Byard, the husband of the artist Dorothy Randolph Byard, and a major antique dealer and expert on Colonial-era furniture, purchased 83 (to over 100) acres in Norwalk, New Caanan and Wilton. He also was instrumental in selling and financing other properties in Silvermine.

The retail stores along Silvermine Avenue were: Frank Buttery's Country Department Store, the Hyatt-Gregory Store, a barber shop, Guthrie’s meat business (now the Silvermine Market), and Mrs. Loudon’s combined Post Office and grocery.

"However vague and undefined as a geographical locality the place called Silvermine, Connecticut may be, there is nothing undefined or vague about the Silvermine Group of Artists. This group is a very definite thing, simply organized, with its purpose clearly stated, holding weekly meetings, admitting to membership only professional artists, and requiring for admission of new members a unanimous vote, maintaining independence, needing no patronage nor asking any. Its weekly meetings held in the hilltop studio of Solon Borglum, the sculptor, are not for relaxation. On the contrary, the member who brings his work to these meetings, as all members are not privileged to do, knows that he is sure of frank and competent criticism, which while it may not augment self-esteem it is very likely to result in self-improvement…There is therefore no lack of good pictures for the jury to select from when the time comes for the annual exhibition." Christian Science Monitor, 4 September 1915

In 1918, after WW1, in New York City, Solon Borglum opened a studio and founded the School of American Sculpture, closing upon his death.

In 1922, after Borglum's appendicitis death, the survivors founded the Silvermine Guild, the country’s longest-operating guild, and one of the largest and oldest art centers in New England. John Kenneth Byard purchased the original barn for the Silvermine Guild of Artists, and had it moved to Silvermine Avenue, becoming the studio, exhibition and performance space for the next two decades.

In 1924, the incorporated Silvermine Art Guild/Silvermine Guild of Artists (by 2024, the Silvermine Arts Center) founded the Silvermine College of Art.

Other artists in the group/neighborhood included: George Avison (writer, illustrator, landscape painter), Edmund Marion Ashe (1867–1941, a painter and an illustrator for New York-based newspapers), D. Putnam Brinley, William Boring (1859–1937, an architect and the Dean of Columbia School of Architecture), John Cassell, Richard Daggy, Johnny Gruelle (artist and creator of Raggedy Ann), Frank Townsend Hutchens (1869–1937, a portrait and landscape painter), Henry Grinnell Thomson (1850–1937, a painter of detailed still lifes), Howard L. Hildebrandt (1872–1958, a nationally recognized portrait, flora and landscape painter), Cornelia Ellis Hildebrandt (1876–1962, an award-winning miniaturist), Adele Klaer, E. Murray MacKay, Augustus Daggy, Clifton Meek, Addison Thomas Millar (1860–1913, Orientalist painter from Warren, Ohio), Sam Otis and Carl Schmitt.

Later members included D. Putnam Brinley (1879–1963, an impressionist and post-impressionist painter, muralist and early modernist), Hamilton Hamilton (1847–1928 a portrait and landscape artist), Leo Francis Dorn (1879–1964, commercial illustrator), and Frederick Coffay Yohn (1875–1933, commercial illustrator), Richard Buckner Gruelle (1851–1914), a tonalist landscape artist, father of Johnny Gruelle), Bernard Gutmann (1869–1936, impressionist and post-impressionist painter, printmaker and illustrator), Karl James Anderson (artist) (1874–1956), Helen Hamilton (1889–1970), and Charles Reiffel (1862–1942).

During the Second World War, most of the Guild properties were taken over by Civil Defense and the local chapter of the American Red Cross, the Barn was used for classroom space for returning war veterans. From 1943 to the end of the war, artists were paid for their work in war bonds at the Guild's Annual War Bond Exhibition.

In 1955, heavy rains caused the flooding of the Silvermine River, mostly destroying the Buttery Mill, with a section of the building used in a new secondary building, but it was never again used as a mill, ending its longest continuous usage as a mill in the history of the United States. Margaret Bourke-White took photographs of the 1955 flood for Life magazine.

In 1959, Spain Rodriguez left the Silvermine College of Art.

Starting in 1962, for ten years, the Silvermine Art Guild operated the Silvermine College of Art as an accredited two-year educational institution.

== Silvermine Tavern ==
In 1929, John Kenneth Byard started running the Silvermine Tavern, a tavern, restaurant and inn with 11 overnight rooms. The group of four historic buildings overlooking the mill falls on the Silvermine River consists of the grist mill building, the oldest, constructed in the seventeenth century, the tavern building, the coach house and the country store.

In the 1930s, actor Spencer Tracy frequently stayed in Silvermine and purportedly "holds the record for eating the most waffles at one sitting" at the old Grist Mill, when that building was a waffle shop.

In 1948 the tavern changed hands and was run by I.M. Weiss until, in 1973, Frank and Marsha Whitman took over the tavern. In 2007 the Whitmans announced they were selling it, with an asking price of $4.5 million, notifying their patrons about the sale with letters to longtime, loyal customers in an attempt to find a buyer who valued the traditions of the local institution, although the marketing was also going beyond that group to restaurateurs in Fairfield County and New York City. The business had 35 employees.

The president of the Connecticut Restaurant Association said in early 2007 that the tavern is a venerable institution, with loyal patrons who would not want dramatic changes to it. Brian Griffin, vice president of the Greater Norwalk Chamber of Commerce, called the business "one of the true New England taverns that we have left in the area, and it's absolutely a part of the neighborhood."

Aside from being a restaurant, Silvermine Tavern was a popular place for weddings and wedding receptions, as well as other private functions. It was also well known in the community for their Sunday Brunch. In recent years the restaurant's honey buns were popular.

The Silvermine Tavern closed on February 22, 2009, and subsequently the property was placed on the market for sale. The business re-opened for inn customers in 2010, but the restaurant remained closed to the general public. In 2012, the entire property was again placed on the market for sale.

== National Register of Historic Places listings ==
In 2003, the Norwalk Association of Silvermine Homeowners began a campaign to get the neighborhood recognized on the National Register of Historic Places. For years, the association wanted the entire neighborhood designated, but because of newer construction, the original proposal was broken up into several smaller sections. The group raised $13,000 on its own and, on June 26, 2006, the State Historic Preservation Office granted $7,000 to study the "core" area of the neighborhood in order to draw up a proposal. State Sen. Bob Duff, a Norwalk Democrat, helped get increased state funding for the State Historic Preservation Office which gave out the grant to the community. Duff told a local newspaper that four generations of his family have lived in the neighborhood.

The core area consists of Silvermine Tavern and 85 other historic buildings, about half of which are in Norwalk, with the rest in New Canaan, except for one in Wilton. The core area was listed in the National Register of Historic Places as a historic district, known as Silvermine Center Historic District, on June 23, 2009. NASH has initiated the development of applications for two additional possible historic districts, the Silvermine Avenue Historic District and the Perry Avenue Historic District.

The Perry Avenue Bridge in the neighborhood, built in 1899, was separately nominated for the National Register in mid-2006 and was listed on October 25, 2006.

== Neighborhoods ==
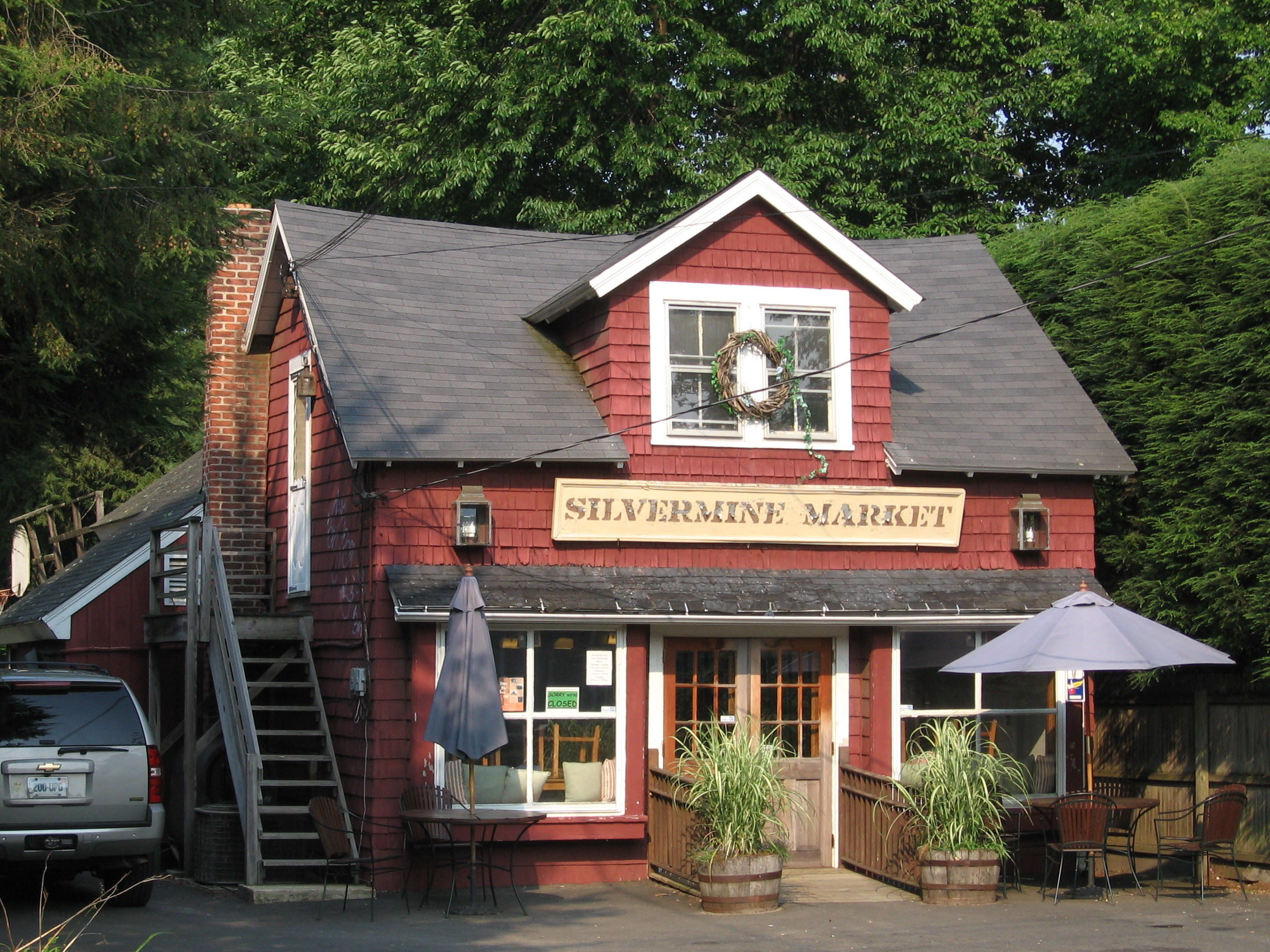
Silvermine Market, aside from the tavern and its associated store, the only other business in the neighborhood

According to the Silvermine Community Association, the northern boundary of the neighborhood is Huckleberry Hill Road in both Wilton and New Canaan. The neighborhood includes both sides of Thayer Drive and Wardwell Drive in New Canaan, Silvermine Road and the streets off it, east of the intersection with Carter Street and Canoe Hill Road. Carter Street is not in the neighborhood, but all of the streets east of it are.

In Norwalk, the neighborhood includes a bit of New Canaan Avenue near the New Canaan line and Purdy Road, Comstock Hill Avenue and streets off it, Silvermine Avenue just north of its intersection with Bartlett Avenue, Cliffview Drive, James Street and Riverview Drive, Perry Avenue north and west of Route 7 and North Seir Hill Road, south of its intersection with Vespucci Road, which is also in the neighborhood.

In Wilton, the neighborhood includes both sides of Seir Hill Road north to its intersection with Old Boston Road, the west side of Old Boston Road to its intersection with Highfield Road, both sides of Old Boston Road north of that to its intersection with New Canaan Road, the west side of Old Boston Road north of that to Huckleberry Hill Road, and the south side of Huckleberry Hill Road in Wilton and New Canaan.

== Notable people ==
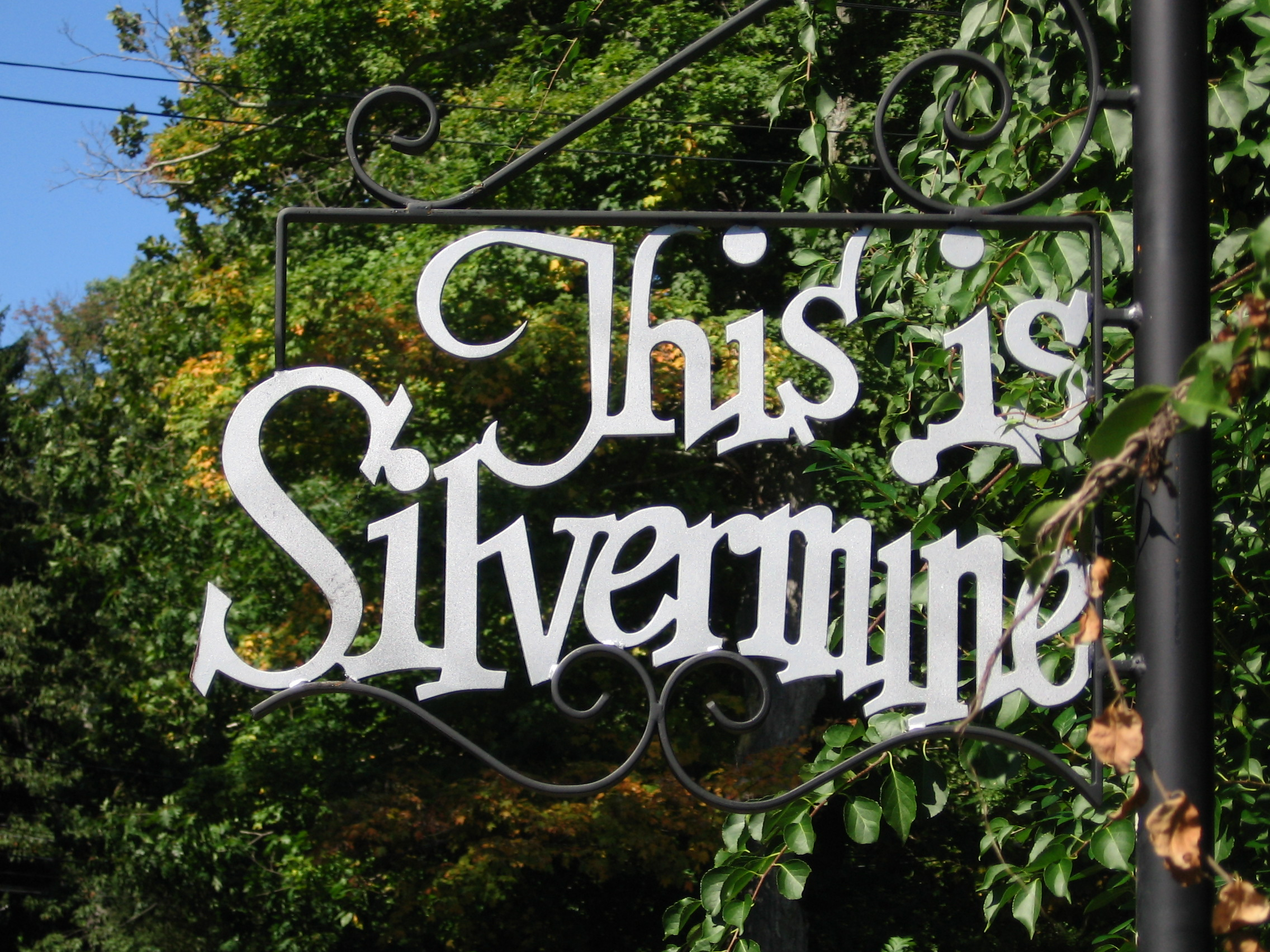
Sign on Perry Avenue in Norwalk

- Edmund Marion Ashe, a painter and an illustrator for New York-based newspapers
- Faith Baldwin, a writer
- Solon Borglum, a sculptor, lived in New Canaan.
- William Boring, designer of Ellis Island and Columbia University dean of architecture, lived in the "Sun House".
- D. Putnam Brinley, muralist and one of the organizers of the 1913 Armory Show. His residence in New Canaan, "Datchet House", was designed by fellow Silverminer Austin W. Lord.
- Frank Buttery, a baseball player
- Babs Costello, influencer
- Edward Eager, a playwright, lyricist, and author of children's books, lived on Silvermine Road in New Canaan.
- Johnny Gruelle, an artist and creator of Raggedy Ann, lived in Norwalk.
- Richard Buckner Gruelle, a tonalist landscape artist, father of Johnny Gruelle
- Bernard Gutmann, painter, printmaker and illustrator
- Hamilton Hamilton, portrait and landscape artist
- Eileen Heckart, an Academy Award-winning actress who starred on Broadway, film and television
- Evan Hunter, aka Ed McBain, born Salvatore Lombino, modern police mystery novelist
- Cornelia Ellis Hildebrandt, an award-winning miniaturist
- Austin W. Lord, painter, fellow of the American Institute of Architects, and dean of the School of Architecture at Columbia University.
- Addison Thomas Millar, Orientalist painter from Warren, Ohio
- Vance Packard, journalist and social critic
- Verneur Pratt, inventor of the microfilm reader, lived in the Keeler-Pratt House in the 1920s. His laboratory and studio was the 1876 carriage barn on the property.
- DeAnn L. Prosia, printmaker
- Charles Reiffel, lithographer and post-Impressionist painter
- Spain Rodriguez, Silvermine College of Art student
- Carl Schmitt, a painter and poet, lived in Wilton) Many of his descendants still live in the Silvermine area.
- James Scripps Booth, heir to the Scripps-Booth Car Company, acquired by General Motors in 1918
- Marion Telva, a singer with New York's Metropolitan Opera, lived in the former residence of Johnny Gruelle.
- Spencer Tracy, the actor, was a frequent guest at the Silvermine Tavern.
- John Vassos, industrial designer and founding member of the Industrial Designers Society of America, and chief of the OSS "Spy School" in Cairo during World War II.
- Frederick Coffay Yohn, commercial illustrator

== In popular culture ==
- Faith Baldwin set six novels in a fictionalized version of Silvermine called "Little Oxford."
- Local author Edward Eager wrote two novels about children living in Silvermine: Magic or Not (1959) and The Well-Wishers (1960). In the books, there is a real silver mine.
- The 1998 movie The Object of My Affection starring Jennifer Aniston featured scenes in and around the property.

== See also ==
- National Register of Historic Places listings in Fairfield County, Connecticut
