= Hewlett (surname) =

Hewlett is a surname. Notable people with the surname include:

- Aaron Hewlett (c.1820–1871), the first African-American instructor at Harvard University
- Addison Hewlett (1912–1989), North Carolina politician and attorney
- Annie Hewlett (1887–1974), English-Canadian writer and artist
- Arthur Hewlett (1907–1997), British actor
- Bill Hewlett (1913–2001), American engineer, co-founder of Hewlett-Packard
- David Hewlett (born 1968), British-born Canadian actor, writer, director and voice actor
- Donald Hewlett (1920–2011), British actor
- Flora Hewlett (1914–1977), American philanthropist
- Frank Hewlett (1913–1983), American journalist and war correspondent
- Hilda Hewlett (1864–1943), British aviation pioneer
- James Hewlett (painter) (1768–1836), English flower painter
- James Hewlett (actor) (fl.1821–1849), African-American Shakespearean actor
- James Monroe Hewlett (1868–1941), American Beaux Arts architect, scenic designer, and muralist
- Jamie Hewlett (born 1968), English comic book artist
- John Hewlett (1762–1844), English reverend and biblical scholar
- Joseph Hewlett (1800–1847), English clergyman, schoolmaster and novelist
- Kate Hewlett (born 1976), Canadian actress
- Locklan Hewlett, American football player
- Mark Hewlett (born 1974), Rhodesian-born radio and television personality
- Martinez Hewlett (born 1942), American biologist
- Matthew Hewlett (born 1976), English footballer
- Maurice Hewlett (1861–1923), English historical novelist, poet and essayist
- Peter Hewlett (born 1941), Zimbabwean farmer and politician
- Richard Hewlett (American Revolutionary War) (1729–1789), Royalist soldier
- Richard G. Hewlett (1923–2015), American historian
- Rosie Hewlett (born 1995), English author
- Siobhan Hewlett, British-Irish actress
- Steve Hewlett (journalist) (1958–2017), British journalist
- Thomas Hewlett (1882–1956), British Conservative Party politician and industrialist
- Thomas Hewlett, Baron Hewlett (1923–1971), British industrialist
- Timothy Y. Hewlett (1896–1986), American architect and artist.
- William Hewlett (regicide), officer in charge of the soldiers at the execution of King Charles I in 1649
- W. H. Hewlett (1873–1940), Canadian composer, conductor, and organist
