= Rock Hall Museum =

Rock Hall Museum can refer to:

- Rock Hall (Lawrence, New York), restored house museum
- Rock Hall Museum (Rock Hall, Maryland), a museum in Maryland
