= Hewletts Creek =

Stream in North Carolina, USA

Hewletts Creek Tributary to Intracoastal Waterway
- Location of Hewletts Creek mouth Hewletts Creek (the United States)

Location
- Country: United States
- State: North Carolina
- County: New Hanover County

Physical characteristics
- Source: Cape Fear River divide
  - location: Wilmington, North Carolina
  - coordinates: 34°10′56″N 077°53′52″W
  - elevation: 32 ft (9.8 m)
- Mouth: Intracoastal Waterway
  - location: Masonboro, North Carolina
  - coordinates: 34°10′53″N 077°50′07″W
  - elevation: 0 ft (0 m)
- Length: 4.69 mi (7.55 km)
- Basin size: 11.09 square miles (28.7 km^{2})
- Discharge
  - location: Intracoastal Waterway
  - average: 18.37 cu ft/s (0.520 m^{3}/s) at mouth with Intracoastal Waterway

Basin features
- Progression: east and southeast
- River system: Atlantic Ocean
- Tributaries
  - left: unnamed tributaries
  - right: unnamed tributaries
- Bridges: Robert E. Lee Drive, NC 132, Holly Tree Road, Cascade Road, Pine Grove Drive

Hewletts Creek is a stream in New Hanover County, North Carolina, in the United States. It is the only stream of its name in the United States.

Hewletts Creek was named for a family of settlers.

== Variant names ==
According to the Geographic Names Information System, it has also been known historically as:

- Hewlet Creek
- Hewlets Creek

== Course ==
Hewletts Creek rises on the Cape Fear River divide in Pine Valley Country Club of Wilmington, North Carolina and then flows east and southeast to the Intracoastal Waterway in Masonboro, North Carolina.

== Watershed ==
Hewletts Creek drains 11.08 square miles (28.7 km^{2}) of area, receives about 57.9 in/year of precipitation, and has a wetness index of 586.63 and is about 11% forested.

== See also ==
- List of rivers of North Carolina
