= Perry Avenue Bridge =

- U.S. National Register of Historic Places
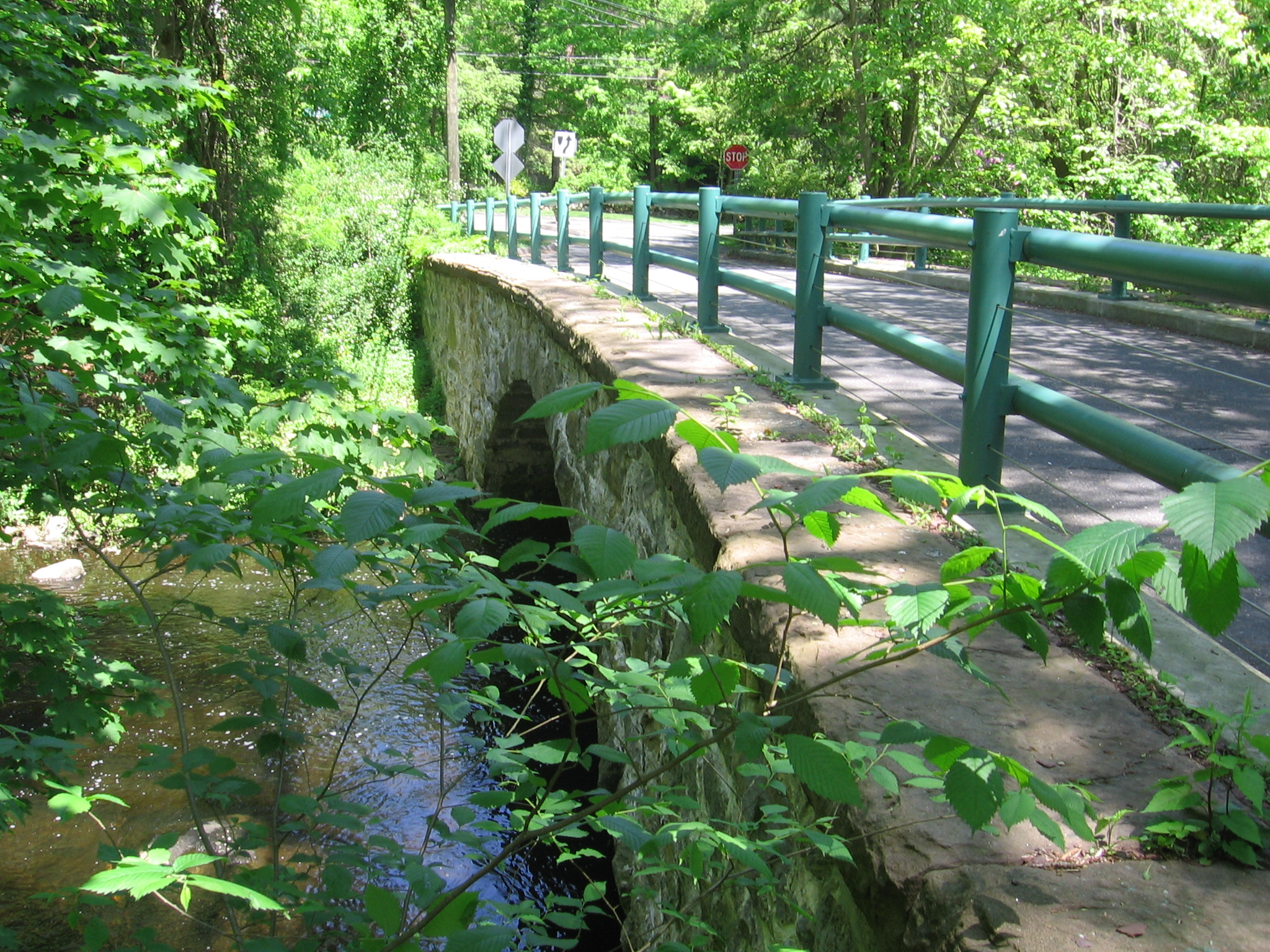
- Upstream side of bridge looking northeast, May 18, 2012

- Location within Connecticut Location within the United States
- Location: Perry Avenue over Silvermine River, Norwalk, Connecticut
- Coordinates: 41°9′4″N 73°26′45″W
- Area: 0.1 acres (0.040 ha)
- Built: 1899
- Architectural style: Single-span Arch-deck
- NRHP reference No.: 06000951
- Added to NRHP: October 25, 2006

The Perry Avenue Bridge is a historic bridge spanning the Silvermine River in the Silvermine section of Norwalk, Connecticut. It was built in 1899 and was listed on the National Register of Historic Places in 2006.

Its depiction in paintings and photographs by artists of nearby art schools has been repetitive. It "has come to represent the history and character of the Silvermine region in Fairfield County."

Features include a cut stone ring and rusticated brownstone curbing.

The 1955 flood ripped rocks from its spandrels, making it impassable.

== See also ==
- Silvermine River Bridge
- Silvermine Avenue Bridge
- National Register of Historic Places listings in Fairfield County, Connecticut
- List of bridges on the National Register of Historic Places in Connecticut
