= Carl Schmitt (artist) =

American painter

Carl Schmitt (May 6, 1889 – October 25, 1989) was an American painter, etcher, pastelist, and writer.

== Life ==
=== Education and early career ===
Schmitt was born in Warren, Ohio, the son of Jacob A. Schmitt (1861–1952), a music professor and organist, and Grace Tod Wood Schmitt (1864–1949). He left Warren High School before graduating to study art in New York City under the patronage of Zell Hart Deming, editor of the local Warren Tribune newspaper and a prominent local patron of the arts. After a year at the Chase School, Schmitt enrolled at the National Academy of Design studying with Emil Carlsen. He graduated from the NAD in 1909, winning top honors for his work in still life. While still a student at the Academy, Schmitt made his first visit to Silvermine, Connecticut, then home of the Silvermine Group of Artists, an artist colony under the leadership of sculptor Solon Borglum. He first exhibited with the Silvermine Group in 1910. After Borglum's death in 1922 Schmitt was a charter member of the Silvermine Guild of Artists (now the Silvermine Arts Center).

=== Friendship with Hart Crane ===
Upon returning from a year of study at the Accademia di Belle Arti in Florence (cut short by the First World War), Schmitt returned to Warren, where he received a number of commissions from prominent local citizens including Joseph G. Butler, Jr. and Henry K. Wick. In 1916 Schmitt returned to New York, where he established a studio in the Stuyvesant Square neighborhood. Hart Crane, then an unknown poet and newly arrived in New York, was a frequent visitor to Schmitt's studio apartment in the early part of 1917. Crane and Schmitt had met in Warren the previous year through Crane's aunt and Schmitt's patron Zell Hart Deming. Just before moving to New York, Crane wrote to Schmitt about his life in Cleveland, Ohio. In one of his first letters to his mother from New York, Crane wrote, "Carl is a more wonderful man than you have any idea. A tremendous thinker!" A little later he wrote to his father: "Nearly every evening since my advent has been spent in the companionship of Carl. Last night ... we talked until twelve, or after, behind our pipes. He has some splendid ideas." Crane got to know some of the poets and writers in Schmitt's circle, including Conrad Aiken. Although they would each pursue their own interests and friends in later years, Schmitt and Crane carried on an extensive correspondence, Crane sending drafts of his poems to Schmitt for his review. They saw each other for the last time in 1925 in New York with Zell Hart Deming. Crane described his friend at this meeting: "He was as always, looked and acted exactly the same as we remember him." A portrait of Crane by Schmitt, done almost 50 years later, is now in the National Portrait Gallery in Washington, DC.

=== Growing recognition and hardship ===
Upon being drafted into the U.S. Army in 1917, Schmitt worked drawing maps in Washington, DC. While on leave in October 1918, he married Gertrude Lord, daughter of Austin W. Lord, a prominent New York architect and member of the Silvermine Group of Artists. They settled in Silvermine, their home for the remainder of their lives, where their family would grow to ten children.

Over the next twenty-five years Schmitt's work was accepted at major national exhibitions, including Carnegie International (1920–29, 1932, 1934) those at the Art Institute of Chicago (ten times between 1912 and 1936), the Corcoran Gallery of Art (six times between 1912 and 1928), the National Academy of Design (four times between 1913 and 1924), the Pennsylvania Academy of Fine Arts (six times between 1912 and 1930), as well as numerous exhibitions in Silvermine and at galleries in New York. He was a guest at Yaddo in 1928, where he met the poet Stanley Kunitz and painter Elizabeth Sparhawk-Jones. His painting The Picnic was chosen for the art exhibition at the Century of Progress International Exposition in Chicago in 1933.

In the 1930s Schmitt caught the attention of Catholic social activist Peter Maurin, founder of the Catholic Worker newspaper, which published a series of articles about him in late 1934. Catholic Worker contributing writer Donald Powell recalls the first time he met Schmitt: "Several of us had gathered to discuss social justice. I remember his stating that social justice could be obtained only by starting with the individual; that is, when the individual was just, society was just, and that the Catholic could do the most by example. Which means, in effect, that Catholics must be converted to Catholicism before attempting to convert non-Catholics to it." Maurin himself wrote an essay about Schmitt for the newspaper, later reprinted in his book Catholic Radicalism.

Financial hardship led Schmitt to sign up for the Public Works of Art Project in 1934; in 1936 Schmitt worked for the Federal Arts Project (the visual arts branch of the Works Progress Administration). He completed fifteen works (7 oil paintings and 8 drawings) which were distributed in various public buildings in Connecticut. Shortly thereafter, an attack of tuberculosis forced him to cease work and seek treatment at a sanatorium in Tagliacozzo, Italy. His wife and family of ten children joined him there in 1938 but they all returned to the United States upon the outbreak of World War II the following year. Three of Schmitt's sons soon returned to Europe to fight on the front lines.

A friend described him during these difficult years: "A fellow of medium height, with a shock of dark brown hair, light brown eyes (Pan's eyes) and a deeply lined face. He looks, and is, ill-nourished. When painting he gets pains in the back of his neck and in his back and becomes so keyed up that he cannot eat. But he still worries the canvas with his brushes and fingers until at least part of his vision is realized."

=== Later years ===
After the war Schmitt preferred to work in relative isolation in Silvermine for the next 50 years, exhibiting locally or by invitation. A large retrospective exhibit was held in New Canaan, Connecticut in 1980, featuring over 100 of his works. In an interview done during the exhibition he stated: "I tried not to exhibit unless I had to. I hate to see [my paintings] go out. I don't like to show. It's an interruption to painting but I feel I owe it to people. I've never sought publicity." He continued to paint well into his nineties and celebrated his one hundredth birthday at his home in Silvermine surrounded by family and friends. He died in Norwalk, Connecticut a few months later.

== Artistic philosophy ==
From a 1921 letter to editor of the Catholic magazine America:

[I]t is good to remember that nothing but Catholic philosophy has ever bred an esthetic philosophy producing works which satisfy at once the sensuous, emotional, intellectual, and imaginative man. No other philosophy can coordinate these faculties.

From the essay "Ritual: The Gate" (1925):

Whenever in the past we have had mystical life and corporate life existing one in the other, a unity with stress laid upon the mystical (that is, Religion) there we have had art. Where there is Life there is art. Where there is true religion art cannot be stopped. Where there is no true religion art cannot be encouraged by a million uplifters.

From a 1963 newspaper interview:

Art must be based on vision, not expressionism. Having aims and ideals in art is pretty rough and expressionism is not the aim.

From a 1978 newspaper interview in conjunction with a retrospective exhibit of the work of Silvermine artists:

I'm a visionary, an experimenter. I'm trying to extend the laws of painting; science has introduced hues the old masters never had. I tried to cope with hues and make them organic. That is impressionism, making forms which the old masters didn't have.

== Selected writings ==
- "A Caution." The Pagan, November 1918.
- "Korčula, in the Adriatic." Scribner's Magazine, February 1929, with reproductions of four prints by Schmitt.
- "A Note on Europe." The American Review, September 1937.
- "Rome and Form." Liturgical Arts, November 1946.
- "Ritual: The Gate," "The Critic," and "And/Or" in Carl Schmitt: The Vision of Beauty (Wilton, CT: The Carl Schmitt Foundation and Scepter Publishers, 2013). ISBN 9781594171819
- Selected essays at the Carl Schmitt Foundation website

== Critical responses to Schmitt's work ==
From a review of an exhibition of religious art at a gallery in New York in 1922:

Mr. Schmitt's work brings to mind momentary flashes of such great painters as Botticelli, El Greco, and Rembrandt, or the quiet reaches of Puvis de Chavannes. Mr. Schmitt works with the independence of authentic vision, following but seldom the established traditions. His conceptions are fresh, spontaneous and virile, but there is at the same time an interwoven peace and remoteness which gives the right sense of balance.

From a review of the Exhibit of Well-Known Artists, Pittsburgh, 1923:

Carl Schmitt has the uncanny power of imparting life to his work. Not by the simulation of vigor through technic but through the ability to make his paintings creative. He is at a decided disadvantage at a large exhibition where the observer cannot isolate Schmitt's canvases from the surrounding inanities.

From a review of the 1926 Carnegie International exhibition:

Carl Schmitt turned away from the assurance of popularity as a pleasant painter to become one of our potentially great painters, although he works in more or less obscurity. Frequently, his themes suggest religious subjects. He never troubles about the conventional associations of his subjects but uses them to indulge his ardent love for richly colored compositions of involve forms in which the human figure does not distract the eye but it is a unit of a co-ordinated whole.

From another review of the same exhibition:

Schmitt is a young American who has exhibited for many years at the Carnegie Institute and who commands admiration from his colleagues but is yet undiscovered by art patrons at large. His originality of invention combined with his disciplined technic promises a future in which he will be regarded as the logical heir of the great Americans such as Homer and Eakins, even though the language he speaks be quite different from the idiom in which they expressed their pictorial ideas ...Carl Schmitt seems to be one of the few modern painters ... that promises to survive the flood of the competently commonplace and the falsely modish. It is a verification of the integrity upon which the international exhibition is organized to realize that Carl Schmitt has succeeded year after year in gaining admittance to the internationals without personal acquaintance with a single member of the various types of juries who have selected these so differing shows. He is the logical modern heir of the few great American painters and it adds considerably to the honor of the international to have constantly recognized his talent.

From a review by Padraic Colum of a one-man-show at the Park Avenue Galleries in New York in 1930:

In all these religious paintings there is something that is very seldom found in the art of today, that is as rare in painting as it is rare in poetry—the quality of rapture. I had seen some of these pictures before and in a place that had a different atmosphere from that of a picture gallery. I had seen them in the painter's house, on rough walls, hanging above where children played or where a family sat at a meal. In these surroundings they had seemed natural and right—they had enshrined the reality that was around. And here beside the Silvermine River in Connecticut I talked with a man who might have worked in one of the cathedrals or belonged to a mediaeval guild of craftsmen, a man who considers art in relation to an economy utterly different from the one that is dominant among us in the world today.

From a review of a local one-man-show by Schmitt in 1947:

Carl Schmitt, over some 17 years of experiment, has redeveloped the cinquecento technique of painting in glazes over a gesso-like ground. The method that gives to the old masters their brilliant translucent depth, that gem-like color value that no straight painting, for all its virtuosity, seems able to attain ... The still-lifes are remarkable. Carl Schmitt seems to be able to bring the same sense of indoor peace and contentment that the old Dutch masters gave their interiors.

== Legacy ==
In 1996 the Carl Schmitt Foundation was established to perpetuate Schmitt's legacy as an artist, thinker, and man. In 2010–11 a retrospective exhibit was held at the New Canaan Historical Society in New Canaan, Connecticut, featuring two dozen of his works as well as memorabilia and photographs from his life and career. In 2013, Carl Schmitt: The Vision of Beauty, a book of reproductions of Schmitt's paintings along with a selection from his writings, was published by the Carl Schmitt Foundation and Scepter Publishers.

Schmitt's work can be found the collections of the Butler Institute of American Art, the National Portrait Gallery, the Shelburne Museum, the Florence Griswold Museum, the Carl Schmitt Foundation in Silvermine (Wilton), Connecticut, as well as in many private collections across the United States.
