= Hamilton Hamilton =

19th-century American landscape painter

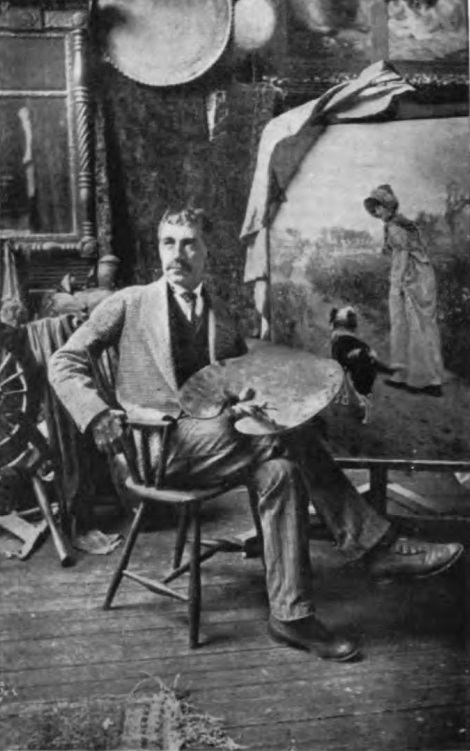
- Hamilton in his studio, 1895
- Born: 1 April 1847; Oxford, England
- Died: 4 January 1928 (aged 80); Norwalk, Connecticut, US
- Education: Self-taught, protege of John Ruskin
- Known for: Painting
- Awards: National Academician, National Academy of Design

Hamilton Hamilton (1 April 1847 – 4 January 1928) was a painter and etcher, known mostly for his landscapes of the American West. Born in Oxford, England, he lived most of his life in the Eastern United States. He painted landscapes in New York, Connecticut, the American West, England, and France. He also painted portraits and drew illustrations.

== Artistic career ==
Hamilton Hamilton was born in Oxford, England, on 1 April 1847. While young, he was a protégé of John Ruskin. In 1872, he began his mostly self-taught career as a portrait artist in Buffalo, New York. He created 47 landscape paintings during an 1873 expedition to Colorado which were chosen to be part of the 1876 Centennial Exposition in Philadelphia. He spent 1878 and 1879 painting in Pont-Aven, Brittany, alongside Barbizon School painters.

He moved to New York City in 1881 and shortly after began to practice genre painting and etching. He became an associate member of the National Academy of Design in 1886 and a National Academician in 1889. Until the end of the century, he and his family resided alternately in upstate New York, Long Island, Colorado, and England. In 1907 and 1908, Hamilton spent two years painting landscapes in Southern California. In 1912 he and his family permanently moved to Norwalk, Connecticut. There he became involved with the Silvermine group of artists led by Solon Borglum. After Borglum's death, he and others founded the Silvermine Guild of Artists. At the time of his death, he was known as the dean of the group.

His works are in the Metropolitan Museum of Art, the Phoenix Art Museum, the National Gallery of Art, the Akron Art Museum, and the East Hampton Historical Society.

== Artistic style ==
Hamilton was known for his landscape paintings of the American West, New York, Connecticut, England, and France. He used multiple layers of colors to execute his landscapes, suggesting the influence of Impressionism. He also did portraiture and illustrations.

== Personal life ==
Hamilton married Helen McIlhenney (sister of artist Charles Morgan McIlhenney). In 1889, they had twin daughters, Helen and Marguerite, who served as his models. Both daughters grew up to be artists; Helen in particular became a noted Post-Impressionist landscape painter.

Hamilton died in Norwalk, Connecticut, on 4 January 1928, aged 80.

== Paintings ==
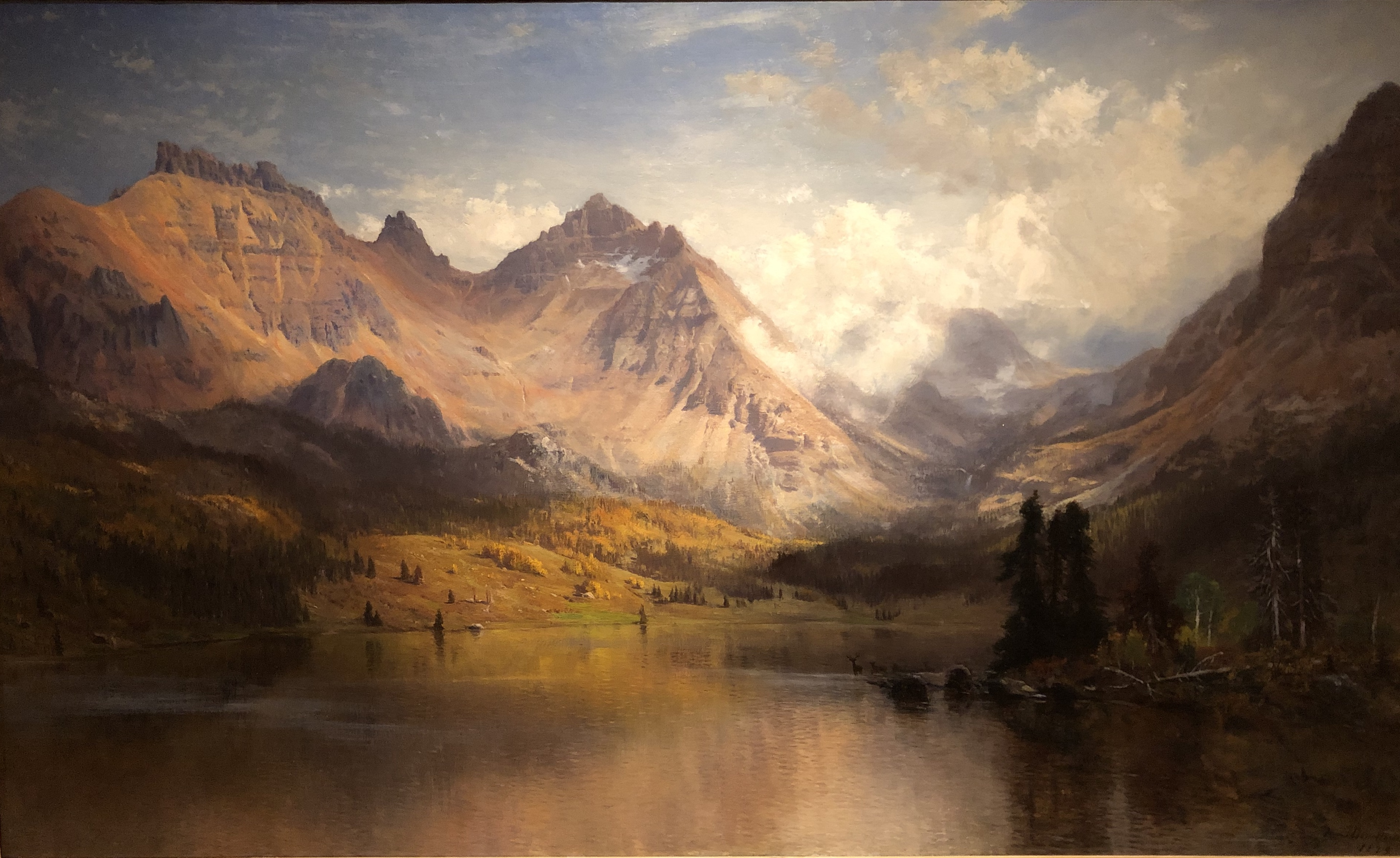
Trout Lake, Colorado (1879)

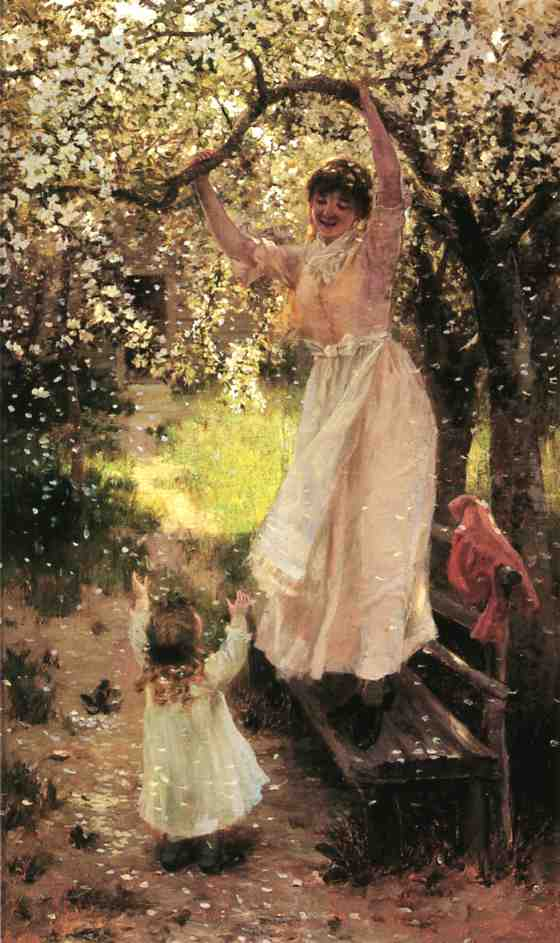
Falling Apple Blossoms

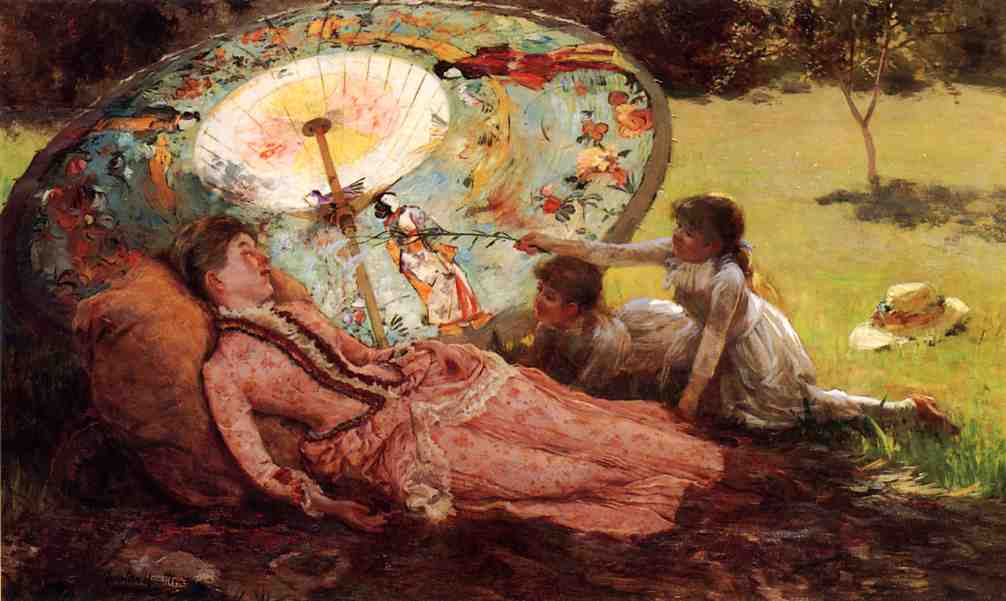
Lady with a Parasol

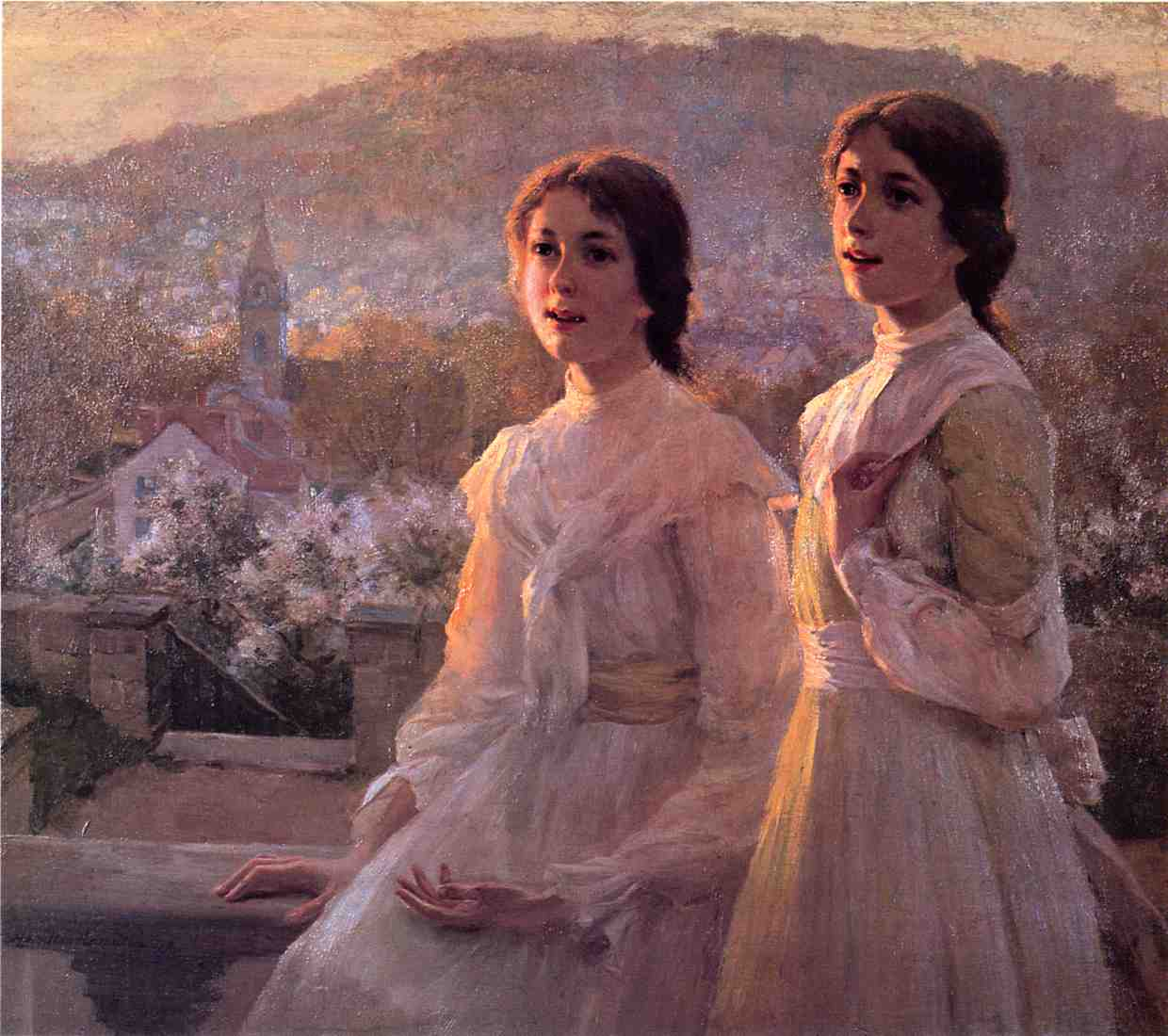
Lil Southern Belles (1894)

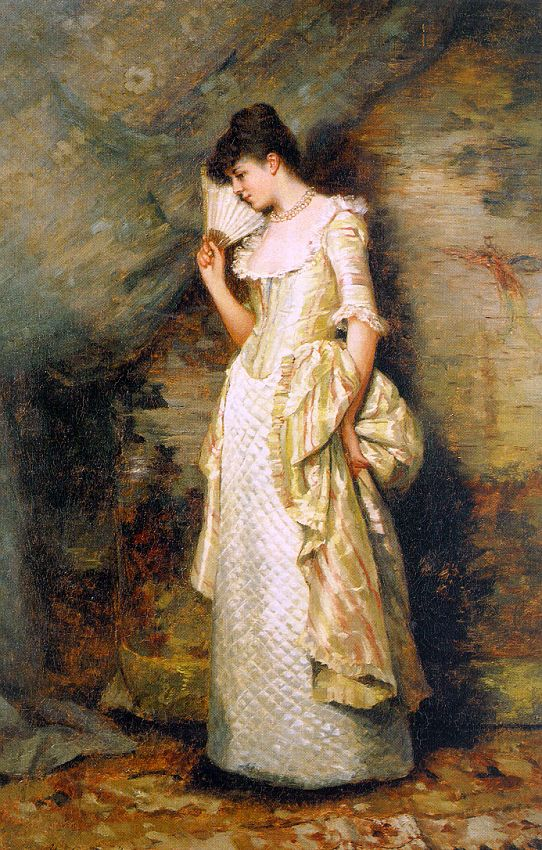
Woman with a Fan
