= D. Putnam Brinley =

American painter

Daniel Putnam Brinley
- Born: March 8, 1879; Newport, Rhode Island
- Died: July 31, 1963 (aged 84); New Canaan, Connecticut
- Education: Art Students League of New York, New York City
- Known for: Murals, Landscape art
- Movement: Modernism, Impressionism
- Awards: Architectural League of New York Gold Medal of Honor

Daniel Putnam Brinley (March 8, 1879 – July 31, 1963) was an American muralist and painter. He was born in Newport, Rhode Island, the son of Edward Huntington Brinley and Rebecca Maitland Porter Brinley. Brinley spent his childhood at his parents' home in Cos Cob, Connecticut, where he was known affectionately as "Put". During the 1890s, he came to the attention of local artists when he watched them at work. Brinley studied at the Art Students League of New York from 1900 to 1902. While there, he studied with Bryson Burroughs, Benjamin West Clinedinst, and Henry Siddons Mowbray, and was most influenced by Kenyon Cox and John Henry Twachtman.

== Life and career ==
In 1904, Brinley married his childhood friend, Kathrine Gordon Sanger, whom he had begun courting during the 1890s. Kathrine would later achieve fame in her own right as an author of travel books. The two of them spent the next four years traveling through Europe, including trips to Rome, Florence, Venice, Switzerland, and the Netherlands. They then spent nearly two years in Paris, where Daniel was influential in organizing the New Society of American Painters in Paris. Brinley had previously been an impressionist landscape painter under Twachtman's influence, but he studied art independently while abroad and began to gravitate toward the Modernist school of art.

In 1908, the Brinleys returned to the United States, and Daniel established a studio in New York City. During this period his work was heavily influenced by the modernist movement, with flattened forms and a deeper hued palette. Brinley had his first one-man show at Madison Avenue Galleries in 1910, exhibited at Alfred Stieglitz's gallery at 291, and helped organize the 1913 Armory Show. He was also a founding member of the Association of American Painters and Sculptors and the Grand Central Art Galleries. In 1914 the Brinleys built a home, Datchet House, in Silvermine (New Canaan) Connecticut, designed by their friend Austin W. Lord, and spent part of each year there for the remainder of their lives. In 1919, Brinley is returned to France after the First World War to see the ravages of destruction. He was so shocked that he decided, with the "Young Men's Christian Association" (Y.M.C.A), to paint the crumbling buildings in order to never forget this devastation. His drawings were gathered in a French book named "Ruines de Guerre" (War of Ruines). Brinley was a charter member of the Silvermine Guild of Artists in 1922.

During the 1930s Brinley earned considerable fame and profit from his murals. A biographical sketch of Brinley featured in the 22nd edition of Who's Who in America, issued in the early 1940s, identified him as Republican and of the Episcopalian faith. In 1930, Brinley was elected into the National Academy of Design as an Associate member.

Brinley died on July 31, 1963, in New Canaan, following a brief illness. He was survived only by his wife.

== Notable works ==
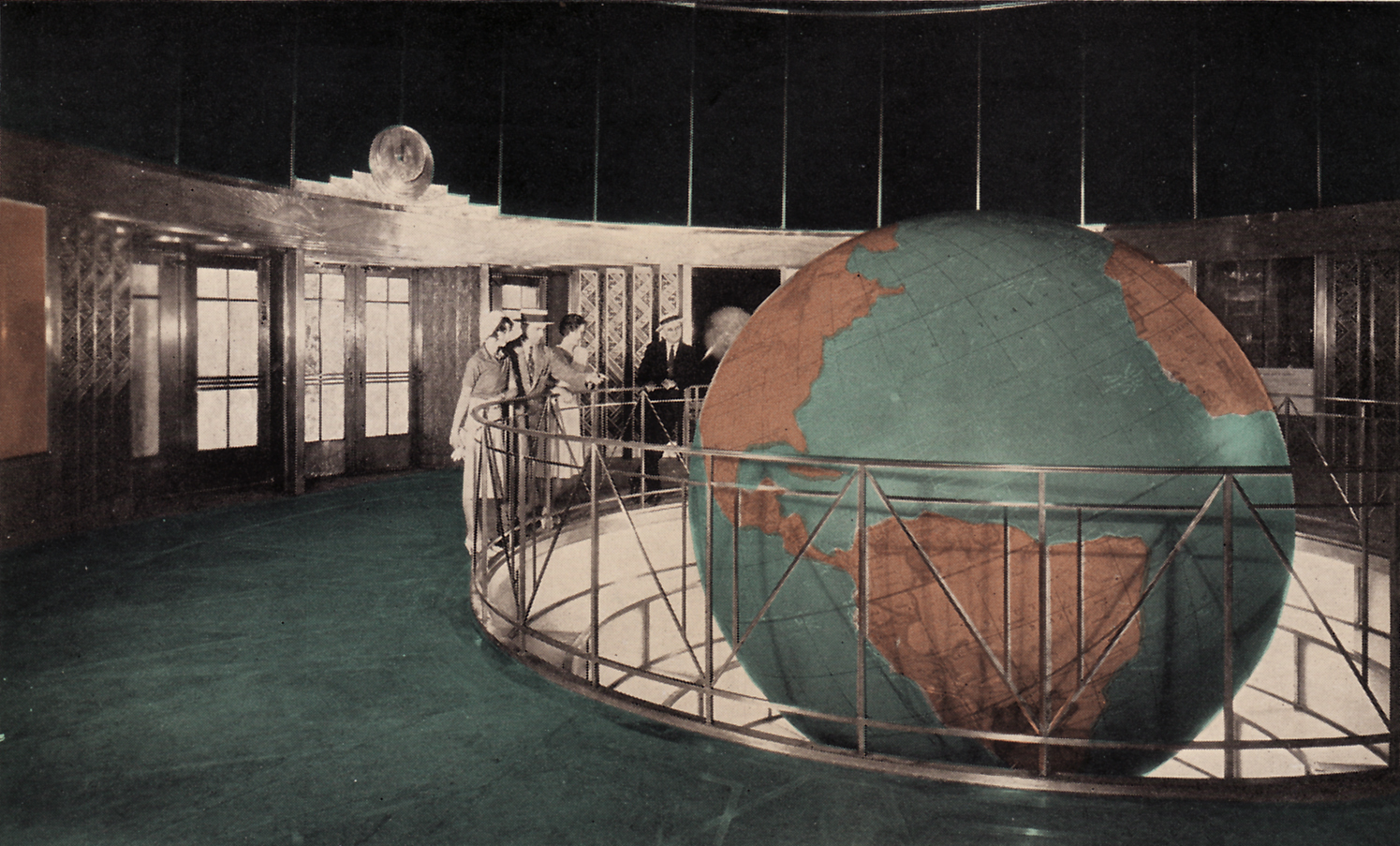
The lobby of the Daily News Building in New York City features Brinley's Great Terrestrial Globe.

At the time of Brinley's death, many obituaries noted the decorative maps that he created for Liberty Memorial, in Kansas City, Missouri. These maps, painted in 1926, continue to be a permanent exhibit in Memory Hall of the National World War I Museum, which is now part of the Memorial site. Brinley also created a mural for the Brooklyn Savings Bank, for which he was awarded the Gold Medal of Honor of the Architectural League of New York. Finally, he created the Great Terrestrial Globe that sat in the lobby of the Daily News Building in New York City.
