= Babs Costello =

American social media influencer and retired educator

Barbara "Babs" Costello
- Born: 1948 (age 77–78); Chicago, Illinois
- Education: Marquette University (BA)
- Occupations: Influencer, retired educator

Barbara "Babs" Costello, who goes by Brunch with Babs on social media, is an American writer, social media influencer and retired educator. Dubbed "America's grandma", she is best known for her content on TikTok. She has also written two cookbooks, Celebrate with Babs and Brunch with Babs, and a children's book, Did Your Mother Ever Tell You?

== Biography ==
Costello grew up on the west side of Chicago and earned a BA in English with a minor in Education from Marquette University. She worked as a middle school teacher before she started her family, and after that began teaching and running a preschool called The Growing Tree. She also moved to Connecticut. She has also lived in Virginia.

She began making TikTok videos after her retirement, at the urging of her daughter: she first thought the platform was for dancing videos, which she was unwilling to do, but was persuaded to create a cooking video instead. After beginning, though, she became inspired to continue, feeling that she was able to give people "the sense that life would go on" during COVID-19. Her videos are focused on food and cleaning: one of her most popular is a guide to extracting the guts from a pumpkin.

She has emphasized self-care and healthcare, and has been tapped to help Astellas advertise their treatment for geographic atrophy. She has also partnered with Eli Lily to advertise their tool for testing for signs of Alzheimer's disease, discussing her mother's experience with the condition.

Her first cookbook, Celebrate with Babs, was released in 2022. Her second cookbook, Every Day with Babs, was released in 2025 and includes recipes such as an Easter rack of lamb. It also included a message from the publisher that wasn't removed, suggesting photoshopping Costello's arms to be thinner, resulting in online outrage at the publishers. Her first children's book, Did Your Mother Ever Tell You, was released on April 7, 2026, and emphasizes classic sayings reworked. Her cleaning-focused book Homemaking with Babs will be released in September 2026.

She was named to the TikTok Discover List in 2026. She has been featured on Good Morning America. She is signed to CAA. She was dubbed "America's grandma" by ABC News, and has been called on to discuss things from Easter and Mother's Day traditions to cleaning techniques and holiday hosting advice. She is also considered one of the leaders of "Grandmacore".

== Personal life ==
She is half-Lebanese and half-Italian. She has four children and nine grandchildren.

She resides in a historical cottage and former basket shop in Silvermine, Connecticut, which she decided to restore despite being told it'd be cheaper to tear down and replace.
