= Austin W. Lord =

American architect and painter

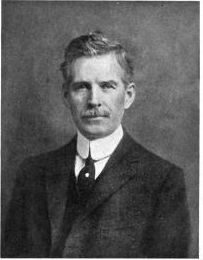
- Born: June 27, 1860; Rolling Stone, Minnesota
- Died: January 19, 1922 (aged 61); Silvermine (Wilton), Connecticut
- Occupation: Architect
- Buildings: William A. Clark House; Edward S. Harkness House; Masonic Temple, Brooklyn
- Projects: Administration Buildings, Isthmian Canal Commission, Panama

Austin Willard Lord FAIA (June 27, 1860 – January 19, 1922) was an American architect and painter. He was a partner in the firm of Lord & Hewlett, best known for their work on the design of the former William A. Clark House on Fifth Avenue in New York.

== Education and early career ==
Lord was born in Rolling Stone, Minnesota, the son of Orville Morrell Lord (1826–1906), one of the first settlers in the area. After receiving his initial training at the Minnesota State Normal School at Winona and in architects' offices in Minnesota, he entered the Massachusetts Institute of Technology in 1884. In 1887 he married Margaret Gage (or Gaige) of Winona, and the following year he traveled alone to Europe on a Rotch Traveling Scholarship. He spent the 1889–90 academic year studying in the ateliers of Honoré Daumet and Charles Girault in Paris, after which he visited Germany, Belgium, Spain, and Italy.

On his return to the United States in 1890, Lord joined the firm of McKim, Mead, and White, where he worked on such projects as the Brooklyn Museum of Arts and Sciences, the Metropolitan Club, and buildings at Columbia University. There he met James Monroe Hewlett, with whom he formed a partnership which was to endure until Lord's death in 1922. Among the architects who worked at the firm were Washington Hull (1895–1909), Electus D. Litchfield (1901–08) and Hugh Tallant (who had been a partner with Henry Beaumont Herts since 1897 before joined Lord and Hewlett in 1911). During various times the firm was also known as "Lord, Hewlett and Hull" or (more infrequently) "Lord, Hewlett and Tallant."

Also in 1894, Lord, under the aegis of Charles F. McKim, was appointed Director of the American School of Architecture in Rome (later the American Academy in Rome), where he stayed until 1896.

In 1899, William A. Clark, a wealthy businessman (and later U. S. senator) from Montana, commissioned Lord, Hewlett, & Hull to design a large house for him to be built on Fifth Avenue in New York City. (Clark had commissioned the firm to design his mausoleum in Woodlawn Cemetery in the Bronx in 1897.) In 1904 the commission led to a major legal dispute within the firm which was only resolved in 1908, and the house was not completed until 1911.

Lord and Hewlett were also entangled in a legal dispute over the Department of Agriculture Building to be erected on the National Mall in Washington, DC. Although the firm won the national design competition for the building (over submissions by such prominent firms as Carrère and Hastings and Peabody and Stearns), the U. S. Supreme Court ruled that the appropriation made by the U. S. Congress for the project covered only the basic design of the building, and that the firm was never asked to proceed with detailed plans, let alone the actual construction.

== Later career ==
In 1912, Lord was appointed Trustees Professor of Architecture and Director of the School of Architecture at Columbia University. In the same year he was selected by George W. Goethals to design the administration buildings for the Isthmian Canal Commission in Panama. "Lord spent the month of July 1912 on the Isthmus studying the topography of the land and local conditions that would affect the design of the buildings. The agreement was that he would return to New York to work out a general scheme in which all of the buildings "from Toro Point to Taboga Island would be of a prevailing style." Due to mutual frustration between Lord and Goethals, Lord resigned from the project in August 1913. Lord's consequent neglect of his work at Columbia led to concern on the part of the trustees of the university and eventually to his dismissal from his position there in 1915.

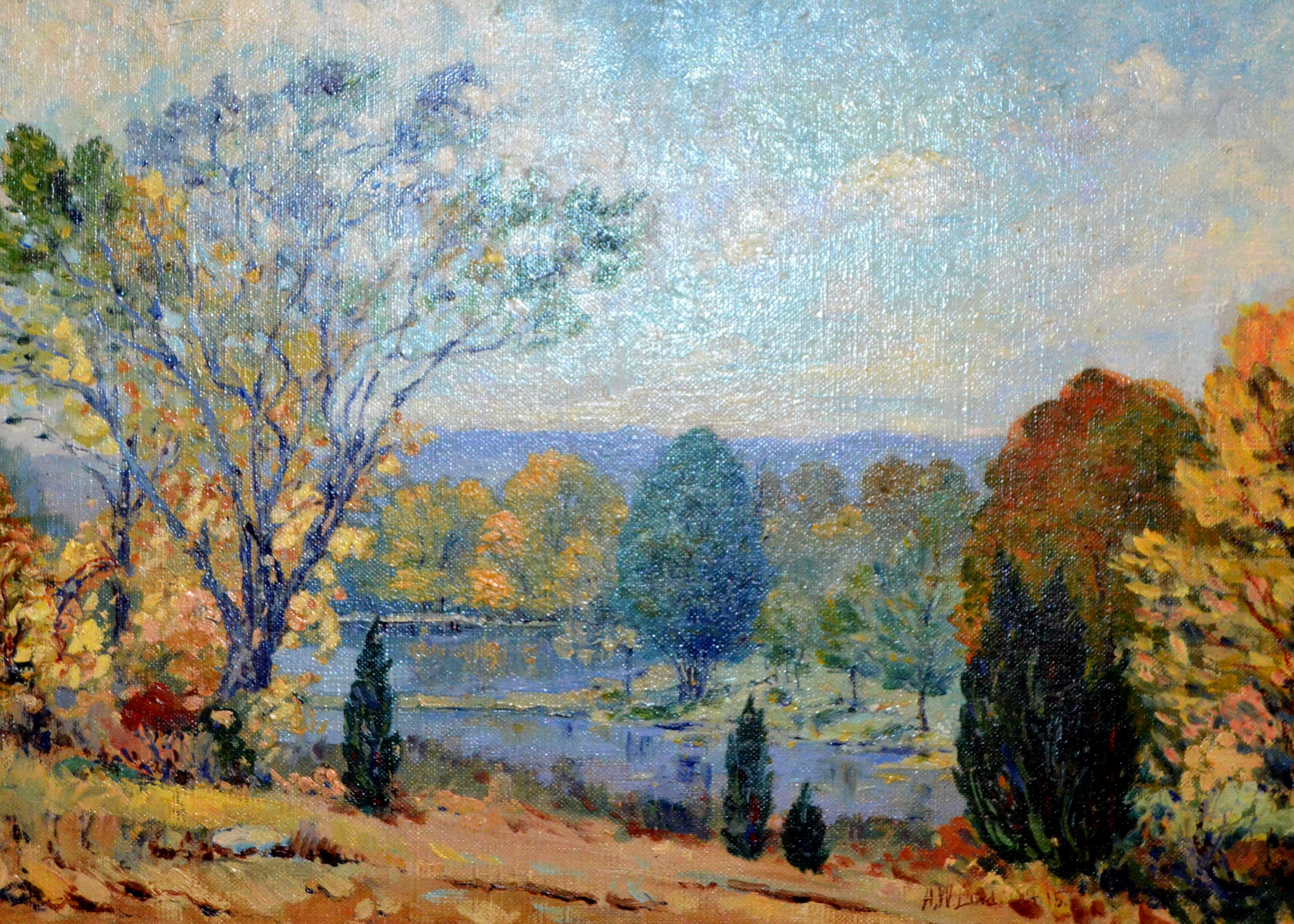
Wilton River, Silvermine Conn. Oct. 1915

Shortly after leaving his post at Columbia, Lord retired to Silvermine, Connecticut, where he had bought a large farmhouse and had been active in the artists' colony there, the Silvermine Group of Artists, since its formal establishment in 1909. Although his partnership with Hewlett was to remain until his death, it was about this time that Lord began to devote most of his energies to painting. This was due in part to his friendship with another member of the Silvermine Group, the painter Carl Schmitt, who married his daughter Gertrude in 1918 and settled permanently in Silvermine the following year. In addition to being part of exhibitions at Silvermine and other local venues, including a one-man show in Winona, Lord's work was shown at the National Academy of Design, the Pennsylvania Academy of Fine Arts, the Art Association of Newport, and the Mahoning Institute in Youngstown, Ohio.

Lord died in Silvermine in 1922.

== Professional memberships ==
- Salmagundi Club
- American Institute of Architects from 1901; fellow, 1903
- Architectural League of New York
- American Geographical Society fellow, 1901
- Society of Beaux-Arts Architects, charter member, 1894; president, 1908

== Selected works ==
All works attributed to Lord and Hewlett unless otherwise noted.

- 1894 – Rockaway Hunting Club and enlargement, 1903 Cedarhurst, New York
- 1897–1911 – William A. Clark house, New York City (demolished 1927)
- 1904 – City Club of New York, New York City (now the City Club Hotel)
- 1904–06 – Branch libraries of the Queens Borough Public Library: Far Rockaway, 1904 (destroyed by fire, 1966); Flushing, 1905 (demolished mid-1950s); Elmhurst, 1906 (demolished 2012); South, 1905 (demolished 1970); Newtown, 1906
- 1905–08 – Branch libraries of the Brooklyn Public Library: Bedford, 1905; Fort Hamilton, 1907; Brownsville, 1908
- 1907 – Masonic Temple, Brooklyn (with Pell and Corbett)
- 1907 – Austin W. Lord house, Water Witch Club Historic District, Middletown Township, New Jersey
- 1911 – Library, Smith College, Northampton, Massachusetts
- 1910 – Edward S. Harkness house, Waterford, Connecticut – now Harkness Memorial State Park, NRHP-listed
- 1913 – Administration Buildings, Isthmian Canal Commission, Panama (Austin W. Lord only)
- 1913 – D. Putnam Brinley house and studio, "Datchet," Silvermine, Connecticut; renovated 2014
- 1919 – Brooklyn Hospital
