= Verneur Edmund Pratt =

Verneur Edmund Pratt was an American entrepreneur and inventor. Pratt started his career working in sales at Sears, Roebuck, and Company. In 1924 Pratt published a book entitled Selling by Mail: Principles and Practice. He started a company called the Sales Guild Company. In the 1920s he ran a small advertising company called Pratt and Lindsey out of 461 Eighth Avenue in New York. During this time period Pratt lived in a house now known as the Keeler-Pratt house in the Silvermine area of Norwalk, Connecticut. His laboratory and studio was the 1876 carriage barn on the property. By the 1930s Pratt was also renting an apartment in the building at 102 Bedford Street in New York's Greenwich Village.

Pratt invented the Optigraph an early microfilm reader. This development led to the formation of the International Filmbook company to manufacture and sell microfilm reading equipment. An innovative approach to film reading was the use of cassettes that allowed for rotating the view of the film. Unfortunately, the expense of this innovation led to the bankruptcy of International Filmbook.

Along with Edmund C. Pratt Verneur was awarded United States Patent 2999477 for a fire alarm (September 12, 1961). Edmund Pratt and the estate of Verneur Pratt were also assigned United States Patent 3388245 (invention attributed to Donald R. Larsen) for a Multicolor lighting apparatus (July 11, 1968).
