= Silvermine River =

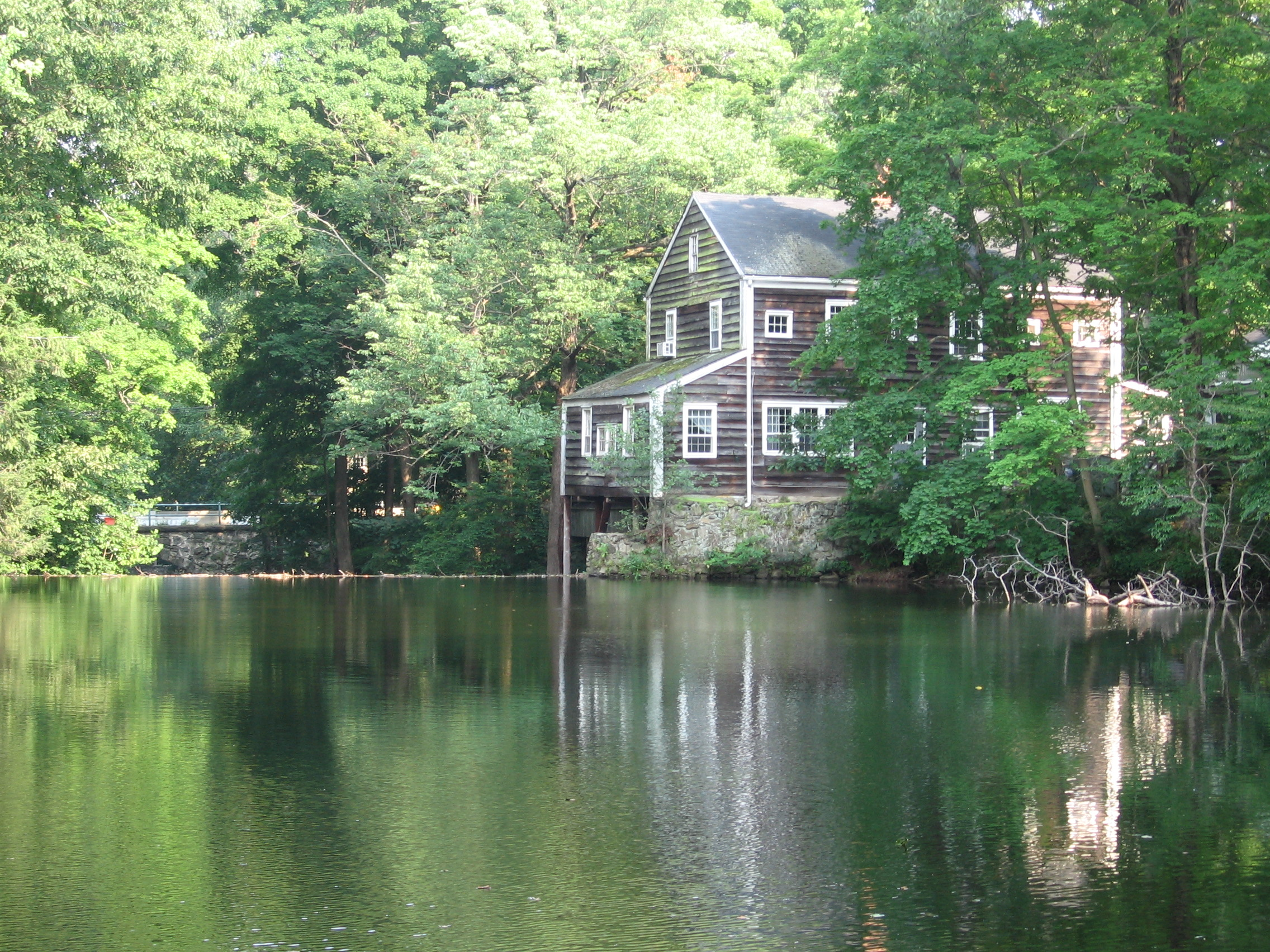
- Mill pond along the river in the Silvermine neighborhood

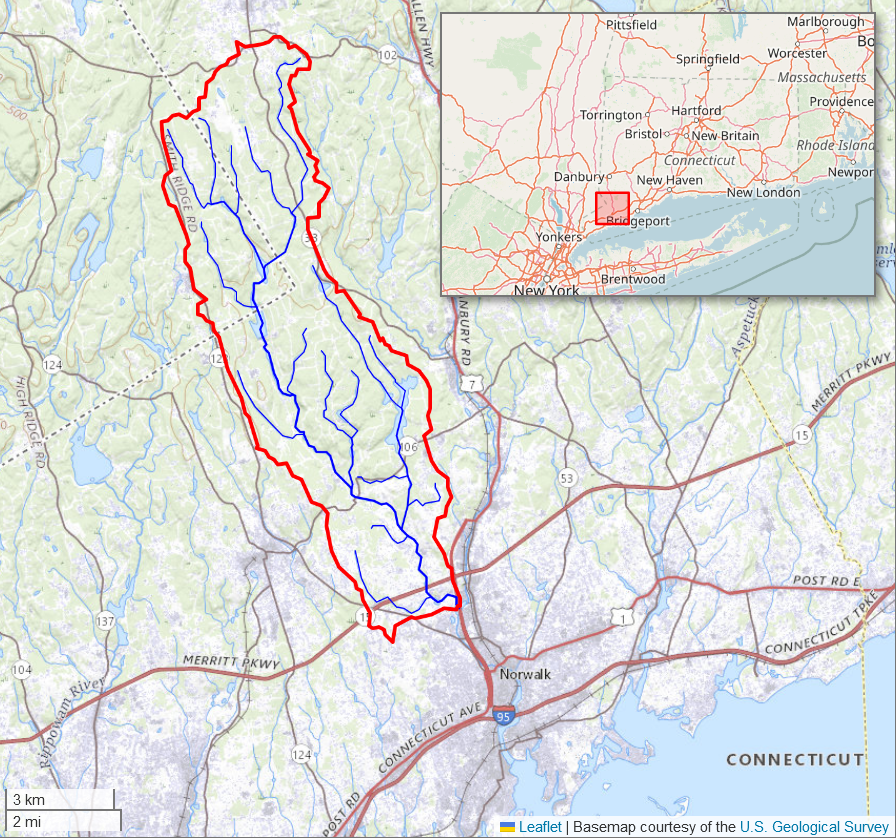
- Map of the Silvermine River watershed

Location
- United States: New York, Connecticut

Physical characteristics
- Source: West Branch Silvermine River
  - location: just east of Flat Rock Drive, Ridgefield, CT
  - coordinates: 41.255°N 73.514°W
  - elevation: 700 feet (210 m)
- 2nd source: East Branch Silvermine River
  - location: pond northwest of Whipstick Road and Nod Road, Ridgefield, CT
  - coordinates: 41.269°N 73.482°W
  - elevation: 700 feet (210 m)
- Mouth: Norwalk River
  - location: north end of Deering Pond
  - coordinates: 41.134°N 73.430°W
- Length: 8.4 miles (13.5 km)
- Basin size: 59 square kilometres (23 mi^{2})

The Silvermine River is an 8.4-mile-long (13.5 km) river that flows through the towns of Norwalk, Wilton, New Canaan and Ridgefield, Connecticut. It is spanned by the 1899 Perry Avenue Bridge in the Silvermine neighborhood, and by the Silvermine River Bridge that carries the Merritt Parkway. It is a tributary of the Norwalk River which it joins at the north end of Deering Pond.

== See also ==
- List of rivers of Connecticut
