= Edmund Marion Ashe =

American illustrator and painter

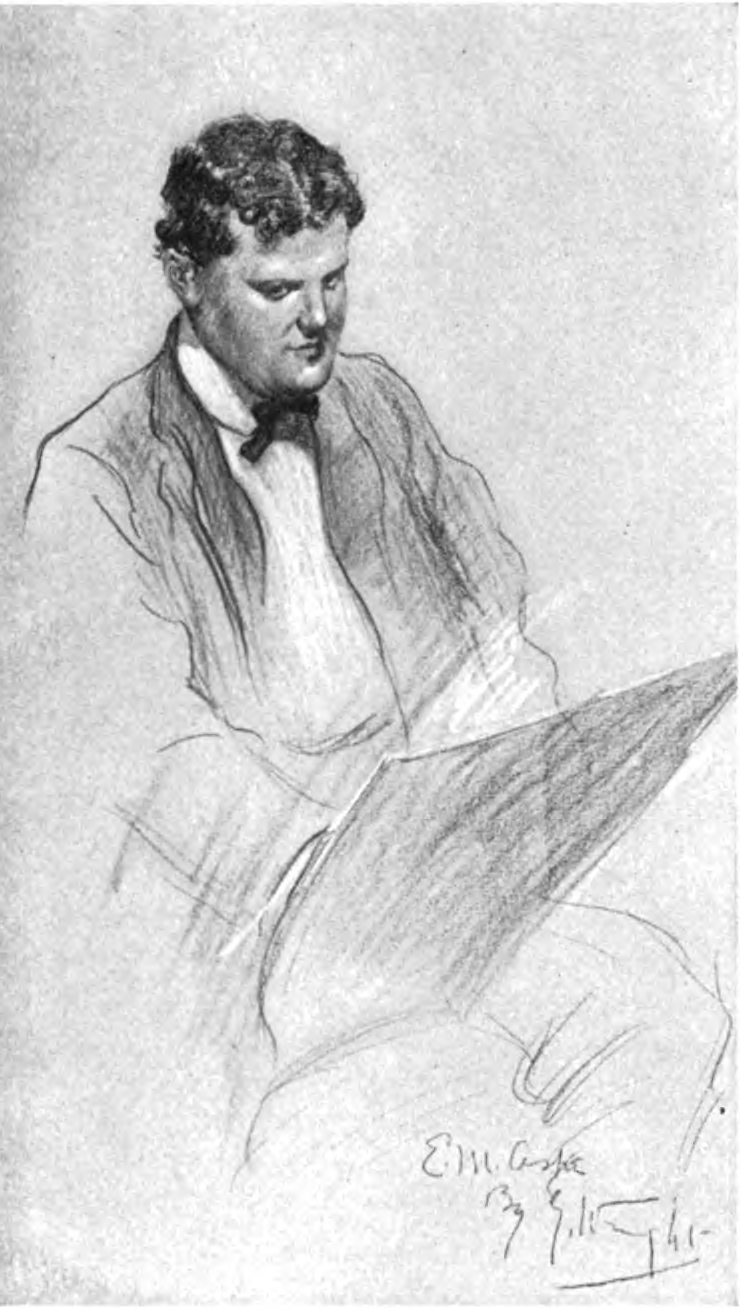
- portrait by George Wright
- Born: 19 June 1870; New York City
- Died: 1941 (aged 70–71); Westport
- Alma mater: Metropolitan Museum of Art Schools; Art Students League of New York
- Occupation: Designer

Edmund Marion Ashe (1867–1941) was an American artist. He was most known for his varying styles of art, which included faithful representations of factories, posters of World War I bond drives, and watercolors of the Gibson Girl.

== Early life and education ==
Edmund Ashe was born in New York, and grew up in Staten Island, New York.

Ashe studied at the Metropolitan Art School and the Art Students League with John Ward Stimson and Charles Vanderhoof.

== Career ==
Ashe began his career as an illustrator for magazines, including Collier's, Harper's Magazine, and Scribner's Magazine. He illustrated the book, In Camp with a Tin Soldier (1892) by John Kendrick Bangs. His illustrations could also be found in Richard Harding Davis' works, like Her First Appearance (1901), Ransom's Folly (1902), and The Bar Sinister (1903).

From 1896 to 1909, Ashe was the White House artist-correspondent for Leslie's Weekly, New-York Tribune, and New York World during President William McKinley's and President Theodore Roosevelt's years in office. In fact, he was good friends with President Roosevelt.

Ashe was a founding member of the Silvermine Artists Guild in Norwalk, Connecticut. Other members included Addison Miller, Putnam Brinley, Clifton Meek. He was also a part of the Society of Independent Artists, and New York Watercolor Club. In 1901, Ashe joined the Society of Illustrators, making him one of the organization's first members. In 1905, Ashe moved to Westport, Connecticut, and founded an art colony with George Hand Wright.

During his time as White House artist-correspondent in Washington, D.C., Ashe also taught at the Art Students League and William Merritt Chase's New York Art School. In 1920, he moved to Pittsburgh, Pennsylvania. Ashe was hired as an associate professor of painting at the Carnegie Institute of Technology. Eventually, he became the Head of the Department of Painting and Design.

== Artwork ==
Ashe's earliest oil paintings were in the impressionist style. During the first decade of the 20th century, his artwork became darker in tone with broader brushstrokes. It has been described as a more "progressive realist approach."

Many of Ashe's paintings depicted the life of the working man in manufacturing and labor. Often the subject matter centered on industry jobs like steel-making, glass blowing, and oil drilling. In 1938, a series of his three paintings were commissioned for the Steidle Building of the College of Earth and Mineral Sciences at Pennsylvania State University, in University Park. These images portrayed the three major areas of business in Pennsylvania: steel, coal, and petroleum.

Ashe was also known for his watercolors of the Gibson Girl, the 1900 "fashion ideal" for women. Besides paintings, he also drew posters for World War I. One poster depicted a soldier throwing a grenade. It read, "Lend the way they fight, buy bonds to your utmost."

In 1913, Ashe's work was exhibited at the Armory Show in New York City. His work was also show at the Ferargil Galleries in 1929 and the Carnegie Institute in 1931. Quite often he was an exhibitor with the Associated Artists of Pittsburgh. In 1932, 1935, and 1939, Ashe was chosen by the Carnegie Institute for the exhibition of Pittsburgh artists.

His work has also appeared in two posthumous exhibitions: "American Illustration 1890-1925: Romance, Adventure & Suspense," at the Glenbow Museum in Calgary, Canada; "When Coal was King: Paintings from the Steidle Collection," at the Westmoreland Museum of American Art in Greensburg, Pennsylvania.

== Personal life ==
In 1893, Edmund M. Ashe married Estelle Egbert in West New Brighton, Staten Island, New York. They had two children, Dorothy and Edmund Jr. His son was also an artist, and drew illustrations for newspapers and The American Weekly after World War II.

Ashe retired in 1939. He moved to Charleston, South Carolina, but returned to Westport, Connecticut a few years later. He died in 1941.
