= Hewlett House (Cold Spring Harbor, New York) =

Historic house in New York, United States

- U.S. National Register of Historic Places
- Location within New York Location within the United States
- Location: 559 Woodbury Rd., Cold Spring Harbor, New York
- Coordinates: 40°50′13″N 73°27′12″W
- Area: 6 acres (2.4 ha)
- Built: 1815
- MPS: Huntington Town MRA
- NRHP reference No.: 85002533
- Added to NRHP: September 26, 1985

Hewlett House is a historic home located at Cold Spring Harbor in Suffolk County, New York, United States. It is a two-story, gable roofed dwelling built about 1815 and enlarged in the 1870s. It features a one-story, shed roof front porch with a bracketed cornice and square columns.

It was added to the National Register of Historic Places in 1985.
