= Masonboro, North Carolina =

- Former census-designated place
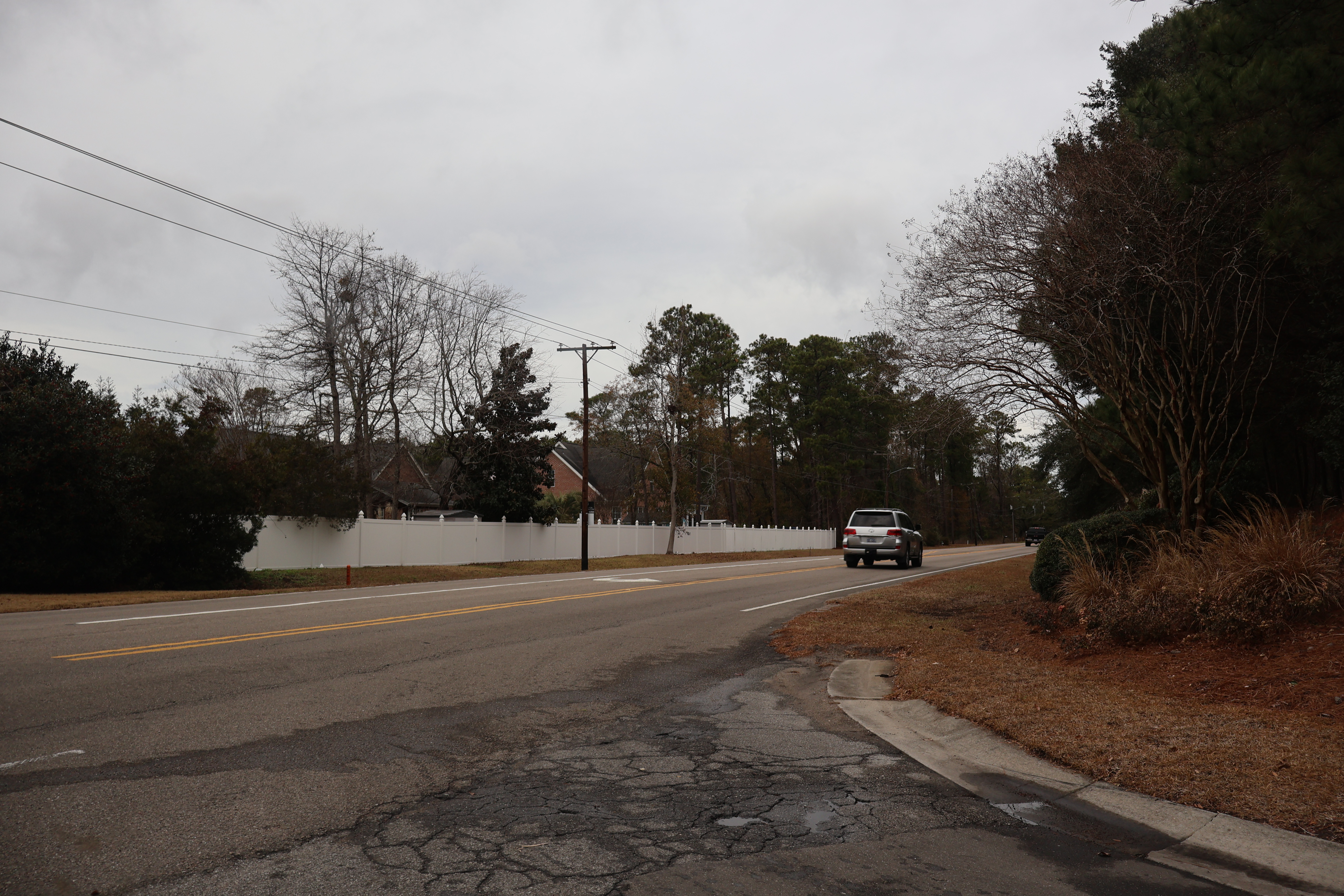
- Masonboro Loop Road in Wilmington (originally located in Masonboro before annexation)

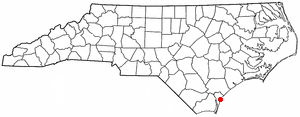
- Location of Masonboro, North Carolina
- Coordinates: 34°10′12″N 77°52′16″W
- Country: United States
- State: North Carolina
- County: New Hanover
- City: Wilmington
- Established: 1735

Area
  - Total: 6.6 sq mi (17.2 km^{2})
  - Land: 6.0 sq mi (15.5 km^{2})
  - Water: 0.66 sq mi (1.7 km^{2})
- Elevation: 23 ft (7 m)
- Time zone: UTC-5 (Eastern (EST))
  - Summer (DST): UTC-4 (EDT)

Masonboro was a census-designated place (CDP) in New Hanover County, North Carolina, United States. The last census count in 2000 was 11,812. Masonboro was located southeast of Wilmington near the Atlantic coast.

== History ==
The Grand Lodge of Ancient Free and Accepted Masons of North Carolina lists the existence of a Masonic Lodge in Masonborough, New Hanover county. The name is "Solomon" which was chartered by England in 1735. A post office called Masonboro operated from 1890 until 1891. A large share of the early settlers being Masons caused the name to be selected.

In 2000, it was fully annexed into the city limits of Wilmington.

== Geography ==
According to the United States Census Bureau, the CDP had a total area of 6.6 square miles (17 km^{2}), of which 6.0 square miles (15.5 km^{2}) is land and 0.6 square miles (1.6 km^{2}) (9.65%) is water.

== Demographics ==
Historical population
Census	Pop.	Note	%±
1980	3,729		—
1990	7,010		88.0%
2000	11,812		68.5%

At the 2000 census, there were 11,812 people, 4,253 households and 3,474 families residing in the CDP. The population density was 1,970.5 per square mile (761.4/km^{2}). There were 4,452 housing units at an average density of 742.7 per square mile (287.0/km^{2}). The racial makeup of the CDP was 93.62% White, 3.35% African American, 0.28% Native American, 1.32% Asian, 0.02% Pacific Islander, 0.32% from other races, and 1.09% from two or more races. Hispanic or Latino of any race were 1.17% of the population.

There were 4,253 households of which 42.3% had children under the age of 18 living with them, 73.0% were married couples living together, 6.9% had a female householder with no husband present, and 18.3% were non-families. 14.3% of all households were made up of individuals and 4.6% had someone living alone who was 65 years of age or older. The average household size was 2.78 and the average family size was 3.08.

28.8% of the population were under the age of 18, 5.0% from 18 to 24, 30.3% from 25 to 44, 26.7% from 45 to 64, and 9.2% who were 65 years of age or older. The median age was 38 years. For every 100 females there were 96.0 males. For every 100 females age 18 and over, there were 92.8 males.

The median household income was $65,110 and the median family income was $68,005. Males had a median income of $51,707 compared with $34,740 for females. The per capita income for the CDP was $27,519. About 2.9% of families and 4.3% of the population were below the poverty line, including 5.8% of those under age 18 and 2.5% of those age 65 or over.
