= Joseph Thomas James Hewlett =

English Church of England clergyman, schoolmaster and novelist

- Born: 30 April 1800; St. Pancras, Middlesex, Kingdom of Great Britain
- Died: 24 January 1847 (age 46); Little Stambridge, Essex, United Kingdom of Great Britain and Ireland
- Occupations: clergyman, schoolmaster, novelist
- Spouse: Charlotte Elizabeth Hewlett
- Children: 9

Joseph Thomas James Hewlett (30 April 1800 – 24 January 1847) was an English clergyman, schoolmaster and novelist.

== Life ==
=== Education ===
Hewlett was baptised at the Old Church of St. Pancras, Middlesex on 21 June 1800, the son of Joseph Hewlett, gent. of St. Pancras, and Frances Batchelor of Westminster, Middlesex. He was educated at the Charterhouse in Surrey, where he was placed by Lord High Chancellor Eldon. His father withdrew him from the school on 16 November 1818 after taking an active part in objecting to the imposition of fines. Hewlett matriculated at Worcester College, Oxford on 13 May 1818 at the age of 18, obtaining a BA on 5 February 1822 and an MA on 25 May 1826.

=== Marriage and children ===
On 16 June 1824 at St Giles' Church, Oxford, Hewlett, who was then living in the Oxfordshire parish of Rotherfield Peppard, married Charlotte Elizabeth Hewlett of the parish of St. Giles. Their children were Charlotte Elizabeth (born 12 June 1825, baptised at St Giles' on 24 July 1826, her father a clergyman), Martha (baptised aged four months at St Giles' on 28 December 1827, her father a clergyman), Joseph Inglis, Frances Mary (both baptised at St Giles' on 21 August 1833, their father a clergyman), Agnes, Caroline, Thomas (all three baptised in Abingdon, Oxfordshire on 5 January 1837), Frederick Leary (baptised in Abingdon on 2 November 1838) and Blanche (born in Berkshire in 1840).

=== Occupations ===
Hewlett took holy orders and was headmaster of Abingdon School in Abingdon, Oxfordshire from 1827 to 1839. His life after that was a prolonged struggle with poverty. He moved to Letcombe Regis in Berkshire by 1840 and began writing novels to make a living.

On 9 October 1840, Lord High Chancellor Cottenham presented Hewlett to the rectory of Little Stambridge near Rochford in Essex. This opportunity was made possible by the intercession of Hewlett's former schoolfellow Fox Maule, the later Lord Panmure. Hewlett suffered from malaria fever and died at Little Stambridge on 24 January 1847. He was buried in Essex on 7 February 1847

== Writings ==
Hewlett's first novel, Peter Priggins, the College Scout (1841), was published anonymously and edited by his close friend, the man of letters and practical joker Theodore Hook. The novel Parsons and Widows contains the first known use of the word "imbibition" to refer to a person's drinking, where previously the word had been used scientifically to refer to soaking and absorption or figuratively to the taking in of knowledge. This novel, which treats of the "Curate of Mosbury", presents a veiled description of himself. Hewlett also contributed many articles to The New Monthly Magazine, including a series of humorous tales and sketches under the title of "Æsop Illustrated".

=== Works ===
- Peter Priggins, the College Scout (3 vols., London: Henry Colburn, 1841, with illustrations by Phiz (Hablot Knight Browne), edited by Theodore Hook)
- The Parish Clerk (3 vols., London: Henry Colburn, 1841)
- Poetry for the Million; poems.... By a Member of Parliament (8 vols., London 1842; 2nd series 1843)
- College Life; or the Proctor's Note-Book (3 vols., London: Henry Colburn, 1843)
- Parsons and Widows (novel, 3 vols., London: Henry Colburn, 1844 and 1857)
- Dunster Castle: An Historical Romance of the Great Rebellion (London: Henry Colburn, 1846)
- Great Tom of Oxford (novel, 3 vols., London: Henry Colburn, 1846)
