= James Monroe Hewlett =

American architect and painter (1868–1941)

- Born: James Monroe Hewlett; August 1, 1868; Rock Hall (Lawrence, New York); United States
- Died: September 18, 1941 (aged 73); Martin's Lane, Lawrence, NY; United States
- Occupations: Architect, muralist
- Spouse(s): Anna Willets (1867–1920; deceased); 10 children Estelle Rodgers Wilbur(1890–1967; until his death); 1 child
- Children: David Hewlett; Anne Hewlett Fuller; Anglesea Hewlett Abbot; Willets Hewlett; Arthur Thomas Hewlett

James Monroe Hewlett (August 1, 1868 – October 18, 1941) was an American Beaux Arts architect, scenic designer, and muralist.

Hewlett was born into an old Long Island family at Rock Hall in Lawrence, New York. He is descended from a long line of Hewletts for which the town of Hewlett, New York is named.

Hewlett graduated from Columbia University School of Mines in 1890. During his time at Columbia, Hewlett studied architecture under William Robert Ware and was captain of the varsity football team. After a year of study at the École des Beaux-Arts in Paris, he joined the prestigious architectural firm of McKim, Mead & White, where he met his future business partner Austin W. Lord. In 1894, he and Lord founded the New York architectural firm of Lord and Hewlett. The firm designed many notable buildings and monuments.

Monroe, as he was known by his friends and colleagues, was president of the Brooklyn chapter of American Institute of Architects, a founding member the Digressionists, President of the Architectural League of New York, and headed the National Society of Mural Painters. He was also a member of the National Academy of Design, Vice-President of the American Institute of Architects, Director of the American Academy in Rome, and Chairman of the committee for erecting Carnegie Libraries in Brooklyn.

James Monroe Hewlett was the father-in-law of Buckminster Fuller and is credited with the creation of the mural of the heavens on the ceiling of Grand Central Terminal in New York City. "Hewlett and Fuller founded a construction company together which used Soundex, a Celotex product in modules for house construction".

A mural at the Bronx County Courthouse depicting Jonas Bronck's arrival was created in the early 1930s.
