= Addison Thomas Millar =

American painter

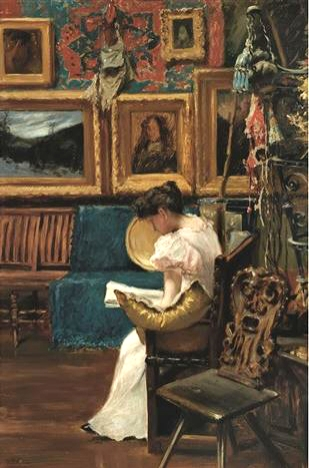
Alice Chase (Mrs. William Merritt Chase) in her husband's studio

Addison Thomas Millar (4 October 1860, Bazetta Township, Trumbull County, Ohio – 8 September 1913, South Norwalk, Connecticut) was an American painter and artist; best known for his genre scenes and Orientalist paintings.

== Biography ==
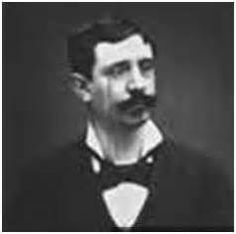
Millar

He was born to William H. Millar and Permelia Kennedy Millar. His father had emigrated to the United States from Scotland in 1845. He grew up in Warren, Ohio. During his primary education, he took some painting lessons from John Bell (1846-1895), a local landscape painter.

In his late teens, he won three consecutive awards from The Youth's Companion, in their annual art contests. This prompted his parents to allow him to go to Cincinnati to take formal lessons from the genre painter, De Scott Evans. Following these studies, he set himself up as a portrait painter in Cleveland.

By 1883, he was living in New York City, where he attended the Art Students League. In addition, he attended the Shinnecock Hills Summer School of Art with William Merritt Chase. In 1894, he went to Paris, where he studied at the Académie Julian with Jean-Joseph Benjamin-Constant and Giovanni Boldini.

He remained in Europe for several years, travelling and painting. In 1895, while visiting Spain with his friend Chase, he crossed over to Algiers; a trip which would provide inspiration for many of his best known works.

He held exhibits in cities across the country, including shows in Philadelphia, Boston and Chicago. He held memberships with the Society of American Artists and the National Academy of Design.

He and his wife were both killed when an express train ran into their car in South Norwalk, Connecticut.

In addition to the Smithsonian Institution, the New York Public Library, the Boston Museum of Fine Art and the Bibliothèque nationale de France, his work has been featured at the Detroit Institute of Arts, the Library of Congress and the Rhode Island School of Design.

== Legacy ==
In 2011, an auction in Connecticut sold Millar's “Rue du Sphinx, Algers” for $7,200.

When Mike and Karen Pence moved into the Vice-President's Residence, the couple added several pieces of artwork to the home. They borrowed landscapes by American artists from the Smithsonian's archives, one of which was Millar's “The Waterfall.”

== Other selected paintings ==
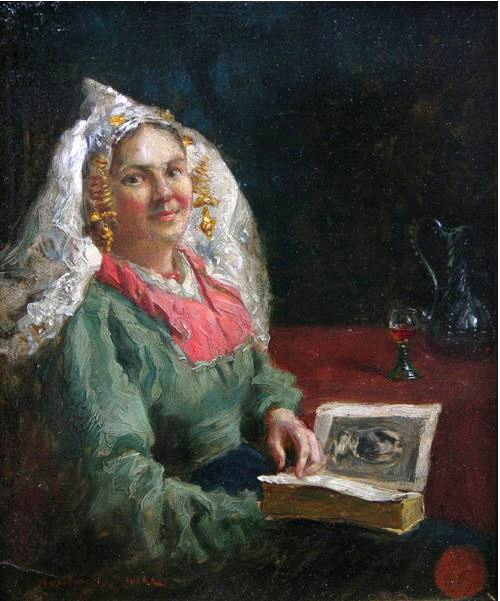
A Zeeland Peasant Woman

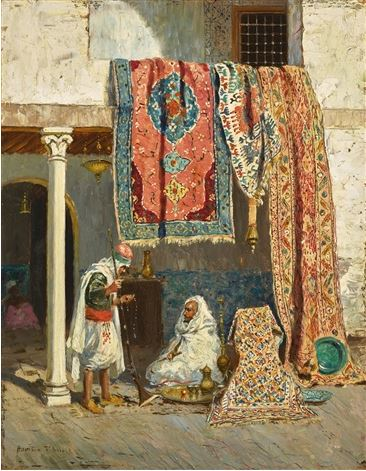
The Carpet Seller

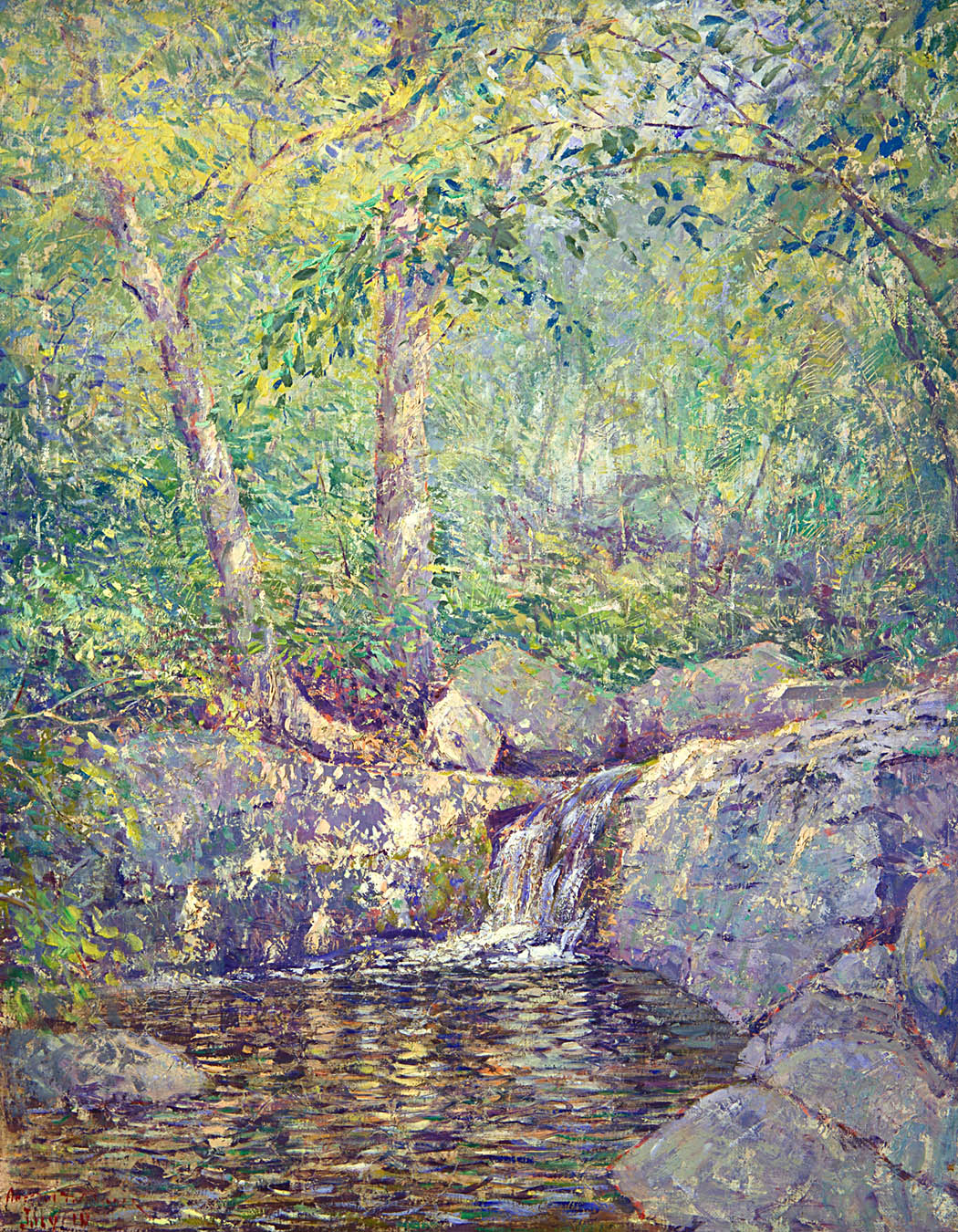
The Waterfall

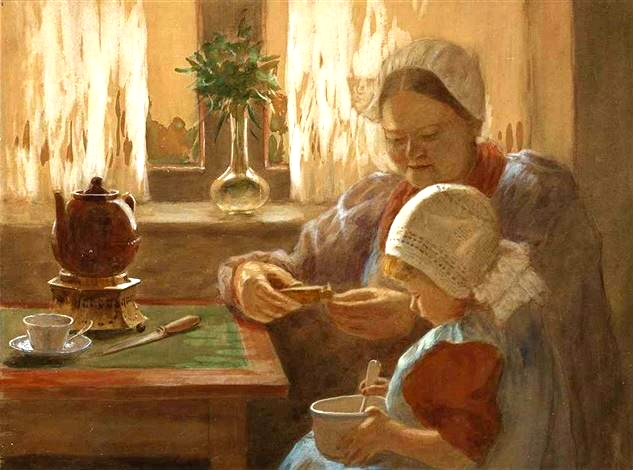
Breakfast
