= Rock Hall (Lawrence, New York) =

Historic house museum in New York, United States

- U.S. National Register of Historic Places
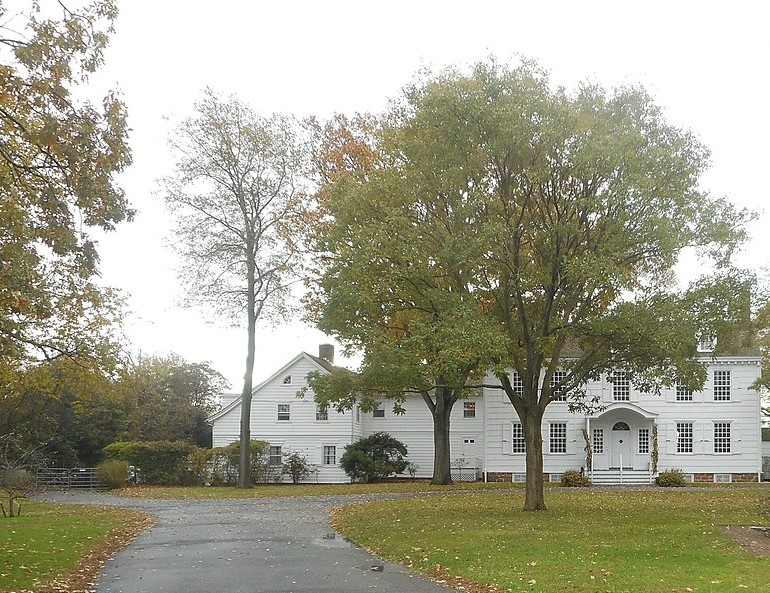
- Main façade of Rock Hall

- Location within Long Island Location within New York Location within the United States
- Location: 199 Broadway, Lawrence, New York
- Coordinates: 40°36′32″N 73°44′5″W
- Area: 3 acres (1.2 ha)
- Built: c. 1767
- Architectural style: Georgian, Federal
- Website: friendsofrockhall.org
- NRHP reference No.: 76001230
- Added to NRHP: November 21, 1976

Rock Hall is a historic house museum and park owned and operated by the Town of Hempstead, located within Lawrence, a village in Nassau County, on Long Island, in New York, United States.

== History ==
The house was built about 1767 by Josiah Martin (1699–1778), a British sugar planter from the West Indian island of Antigua, and stands on a manorial, park-like setting overlooking Jamaica Bay. It is a 2 1/2-story, Georgian-style frame dwelling, with a T-shaped frame wing. It is five bays wide, with a central portico shielding the main entry. During the early 1950s, the Town of Hempstead restored the house to its original appearance. It was listed on the National Register of Historic Places in 1976.
