= James Hewlett (painter) =

English flower painter

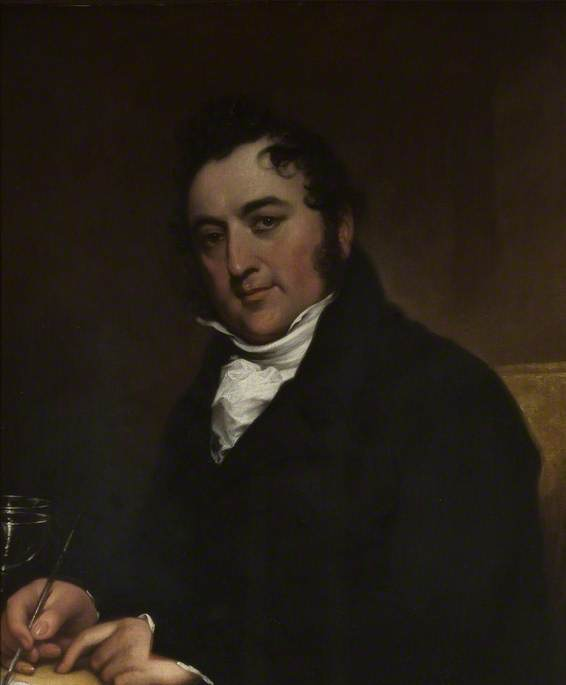
Self Portrait, Seated at a Table (middle-aged)

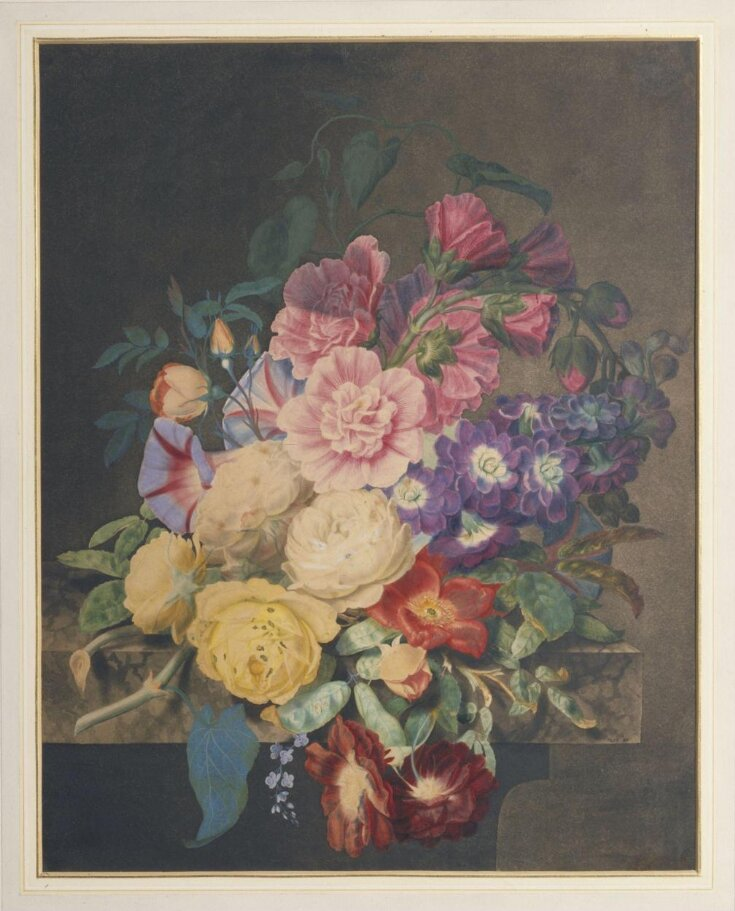
Hollyhocks, Roses, &c. (c. 1795–1836)

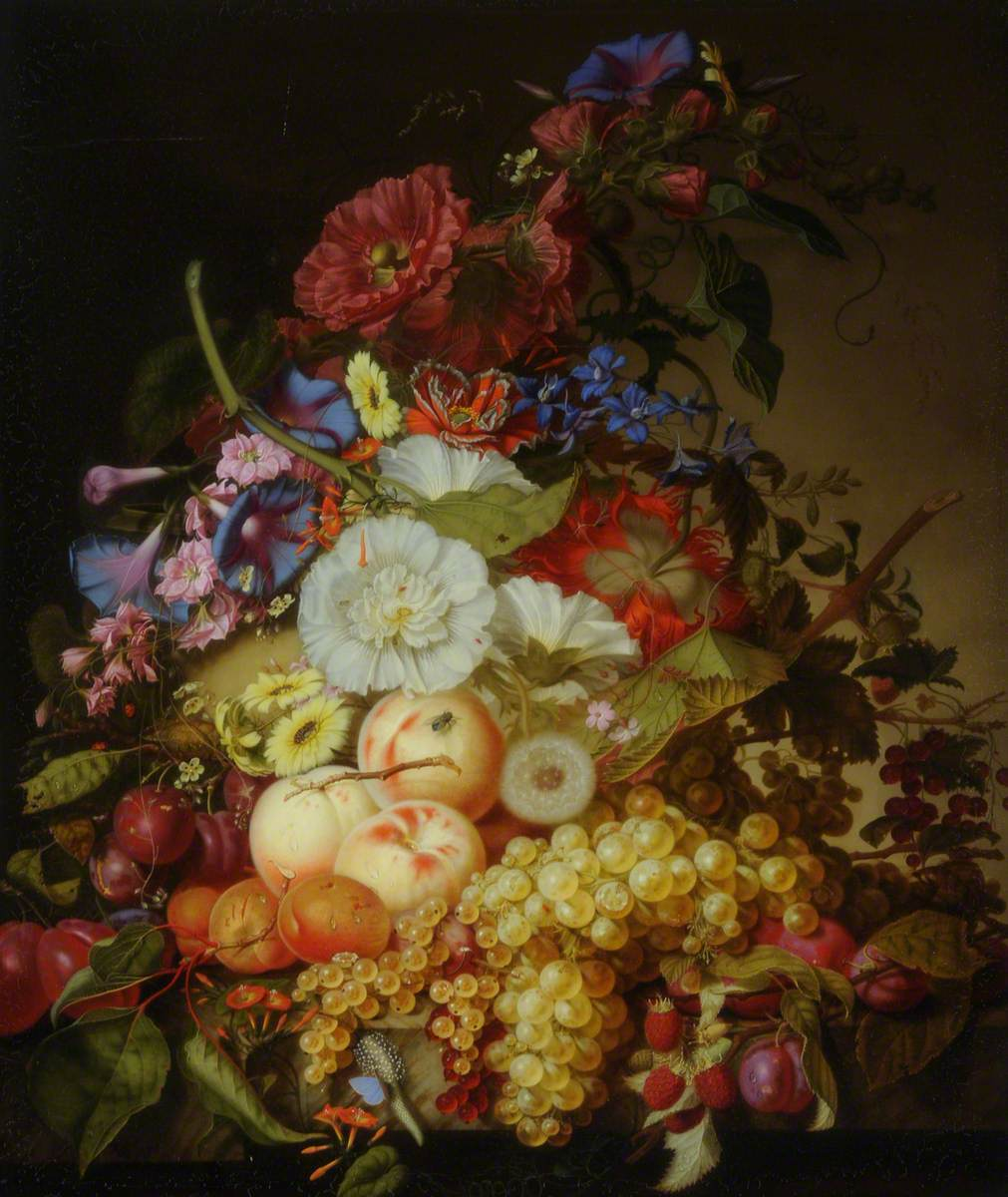
Still Life with Fruit and Flowers on a Stone Ledge (1799–1836)

James Hewlett (1768–1836) was an English flower-painter.

== Life ==
James Hewlett, born on 15 September 1768, was the son of a gardener and an associate in boyhood of John Britton, the Wiltshire antiquary. He practised chiefly at Bath, painting flowers in water-colours, which are noted for good drawing, colour, and botanical accuracy. He occasionally painted other subjects, such as gipsies, and contributed to the Royal Academy and other exhibitions.

=== Death ===
He died at Park House, Isleworth, on 18 August 1836, and was buried in Isleworth Church, where a monument was erected by his widow.

== Works ==
- London (Victoria and Albert Museum): Flowers (5 paintings).

== Likenesses ==
- James Hewlett, self-portrait, oils (middle-aged), Victoria Art Gallery, Bath;
- John Varley, profile pencil drawing, Victoria Art Gallery, Bath.

== Identity ==
Another painter of the same name, whose relationship is undetermined, practised at Bath at an earlier date. Queen Charlotte visited his studio in 1817. It is difficult to distinguish their works. The elder Hewlett died at Notting Hill, London, in 1829. The sister of one was the wife of Benjamin Barker.
