= Brigham Young (disambiguation) =

Brigham Young (1801–1877) was an American colonizer and president of The Church of Jesus Christ of Latter-day Saints (LDS Church).

Brigham Young may also refer to:

== People ==
- Brigham Young, Jr. (1836–1903), American Mormon missionary and leader in the LDS Church
- Brigham Morris Young (1854–1931), another son of Brigham Young

== Landmarks ==
- Brigham Young Complex, a U.S. National Historic Landmark in Salt Lake City, Utah
- Brigham Young Monument

== Universities ==
- Brigham Young University, a university in Provo, Utah owned by the LDS Church
- Brigham Young University–Hawaii, a university in Laie, Hawaii owned by the LDS Church
- Brigham Young University–Idaho, a university in Rexburg, Idaho owned by the LDS Church

== Art, entertainment, and media ==
- Brigham Young (film), a 1940 American film
- Brigham Young: American Moses, a 1985 biography by Leonard J. Arrington
- Brigham Young (Mahonri Young statue)
