= Dorothy Weir Young =

American painter

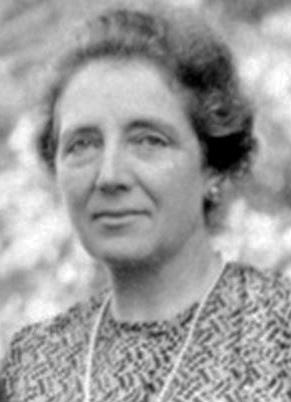
- Born: June 18, 1890; New York City, US
- Died: May 28, 1947 (aged 57)
- Occupation: Artist
- Spouse: Mahonri Young
- Parent(s): J. Alden Weir; Anna Baker Weir

Dorothy Weir Young (June 18, 1890 – May 28, 1947) was an American artist. She was the daughter of the American Impressionist artist J. Alden Weir, and later married sculptor Mahonri Young. Dorothy Young was the primary author of The Life and Letters of J. Alden Weir, which was published posthumously.

== Early life ==
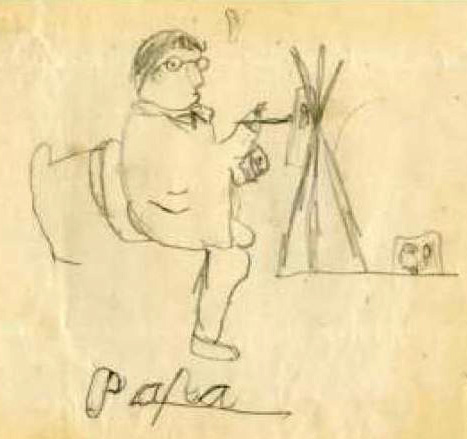
Sketch of J. Alden Weir by Dorothy Weir Young in 1896. Graphite on paper.

Dorothy Weir Young was born on June 18, 1890, to J. Alden Weir and Anna Baker Weir in New York City. She was the couple's second daughter. Her father was a well-known American impressionist painter. Young recalled visiting the studio of James McNeill Whistler as a young girl with her family. Young trained under him and later became a professional artist herself. She studied art at the National Association of Women Painters and Sculptors at the Brooklyn Museum. Weir often participated in the puzzles in the Brooklyn Daily Eagle newspaper and was featured as one of their lucky puzzle winners multiple times.

In 1911, she began studying at the National Academy of Design. She studied many fields including oils, watercolors, and woodblock prints. During World War I, Young gave financial support to children from Belgium. She also became first aid and surgical certification from the American Red Cross.

== Career ==
Young's father greatly influenced her decision to become an artist. Although he died in 1919, she continued to study and practice art. During her lifetime she made more than 400 pieces of artwork in various media. In 1922, she was on the committee for the opening of the Duncan Phillips Memorial Art Gallery. Some of her work was displayed in 1935 as part of a flower painting exhibit by the American Woman's Association. Her work was also shown at the Brooklyn Museum, the National Academy of Design, the Pennsylvania Academy, and the Stockbridge Art Association. Much of her work depicts nature and the outdoors. Much of her artwork is displayed at the Museum of Art at Brigham Young University.

=== Awards ===
Young's artwork in woodblocks and oil paintings won prizes during her lifetime. Young received the Joan of Arc bronze medal from the National Association of Women Painters and Sculptors in 1928. The following hear she was the recipient of the Crowinshield prize from the Annual Exhibit of Paintings and Sculpture of the Stockinbridge Art Association. In 1940, she was indicted into the National Association of Women Artists. That same year she was also inducted into the Who's Who in American Art.

== Gallery ==
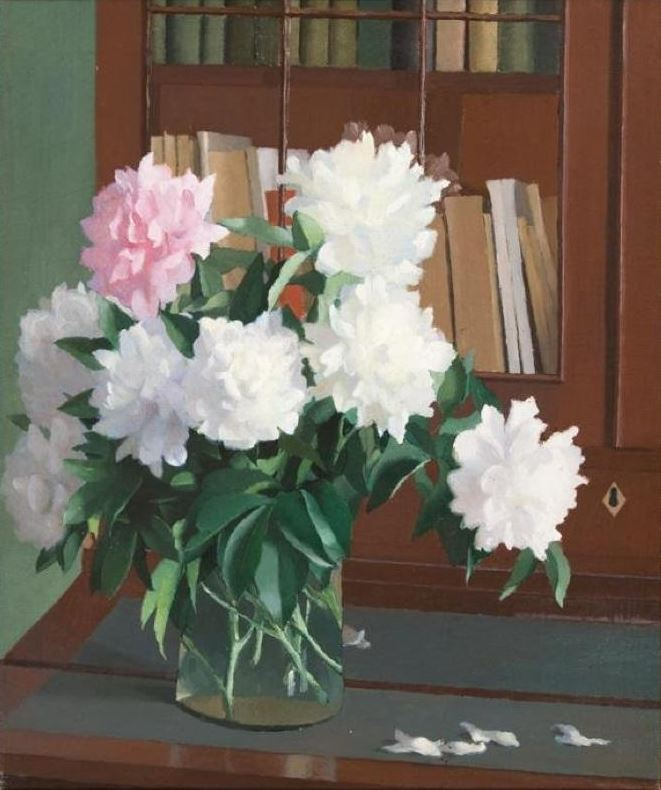
Still Life of Peonies
Oil on canvas

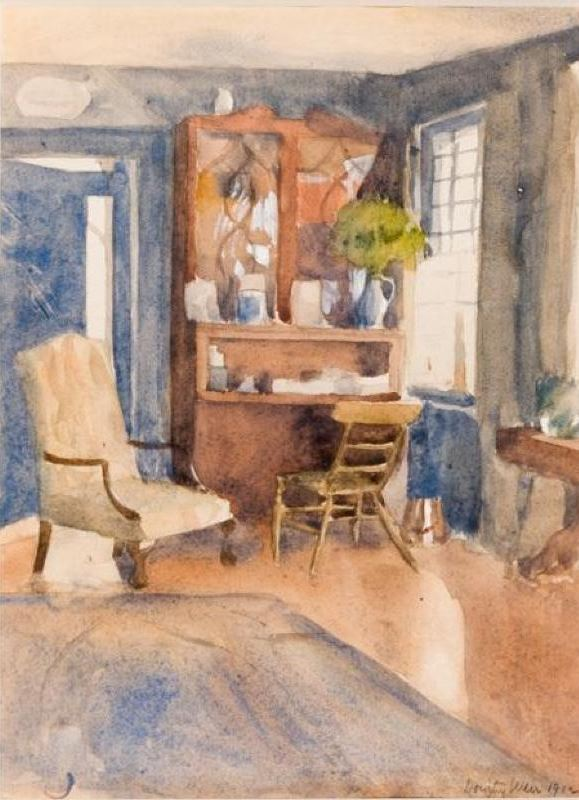
Interior of the Living Room at Weirs Farm
Watercolor on paper
c. 1930

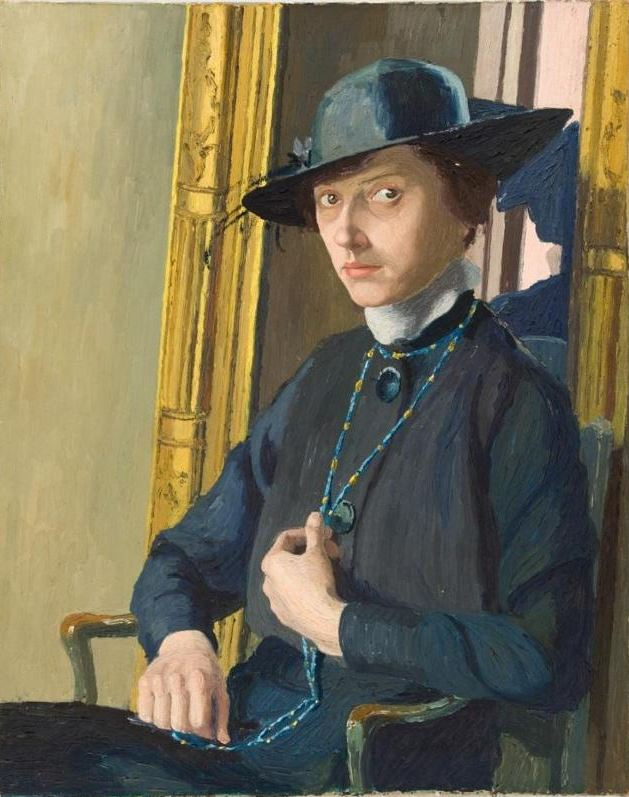
Seated Portrait of a Woman in a Black Dress and Hat
Oil on canvas

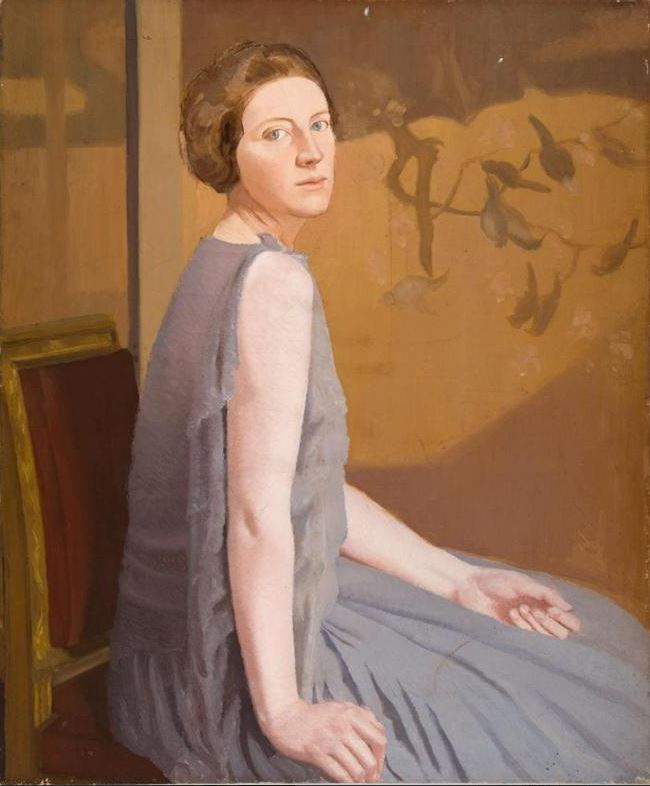
Seated Portrait by Dorothy Weir Young
Oil on canvas

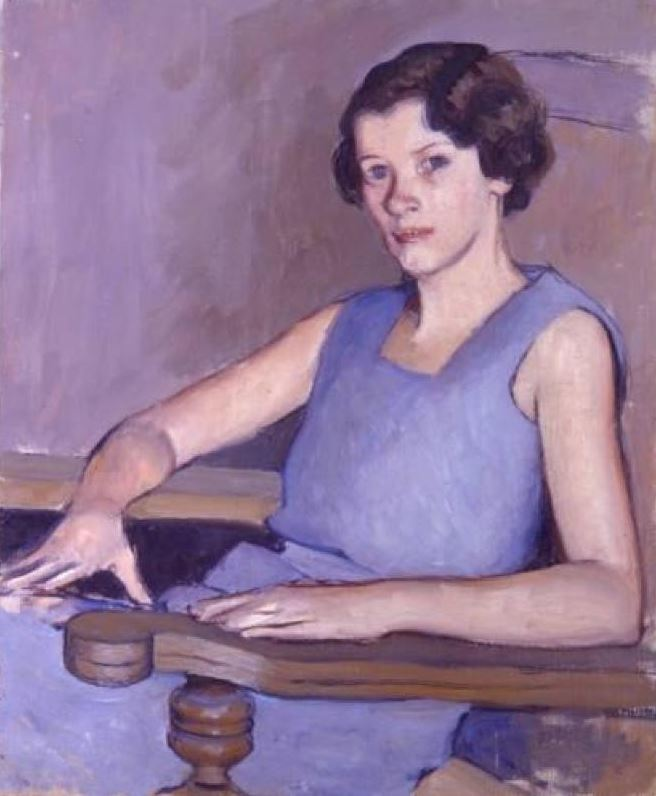
Portrait of Theresa Knoche
Oil on canvas
c. 1920

== Later life ==
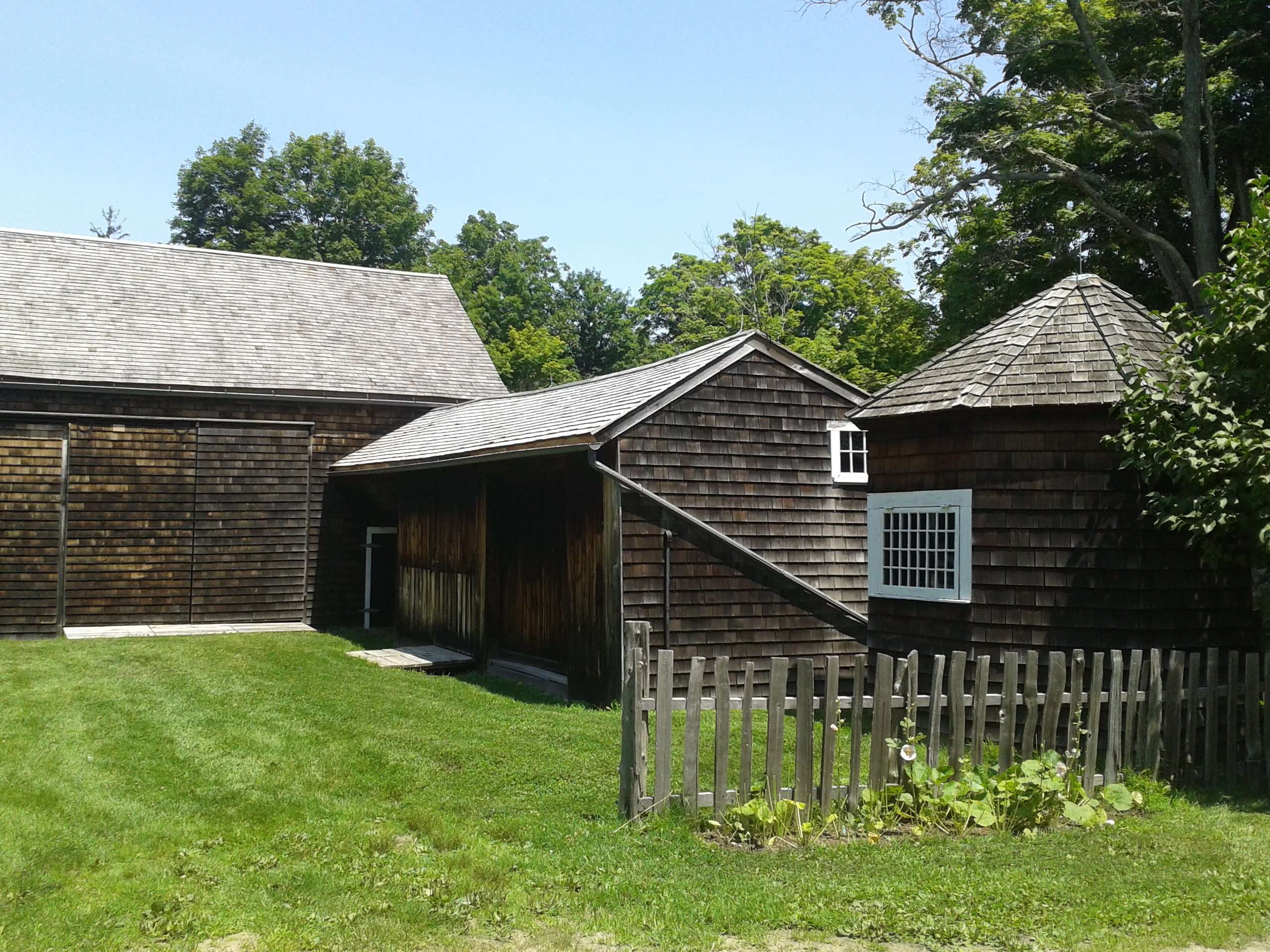
Weir Farm National Historic Site

She married Mahonri Young, a sculptor, in February 1931. They spent a lot of their time together in Branchville, Connecticut, where they built a studio in 1932. The couple traveled to Utah on various occasions because her husband was the sculptor of the This is the Place Monument. As she got older, her health declined. She died on May 28, 1947, in New York from cancer.

Throughout her life, Young had been working on a biography for her father called The Life and Letters of J. Alden Weir. The book was published posthumously in 1960. During her lifetime she also worked hard to preserve her father's farm; the Weir Farm National Historic Site was established in 1990. It is the only National Park in the United States that is dedicated to painting. The park is over 60 acres and includes the Weir House, the Weir Pond, and the Weir and Young Studio.
