= Mahonri Young =

American sculptor

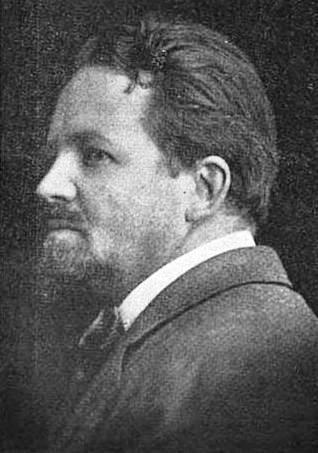
- Young in 1913
- Born: Mahonri Mackintosh Young; August 9, 1877; Salt Lake City, Utah Territory
- Died: November 2, 1957 (aged 80); Norwalk, Connecticut, U.S.
- Resting place: Salt Lake City Cemetery, Utah
- Known for: Sculpting
- Notable work: Seagull Monument (1913); This is the Place Monument (1947); Brigham Young (1949)
- Movement: Social realism
- Spouse(s): Cecelia Sharp; Dorothy Weir
- Relatives: Waldemar Young (brother); Brigham Young (grandfather)

Medal record

Art competitions

Representing the United States

Olympic Games
Gold medal – first place	1932 Los Angeles	Sculpture: Statues

Mahonri Mackintosh Young (August 9, 1877 – November 2, 1957) was an American social-realist sculptor and artist. During his lengthy career, he created more than 320 sculptures, 590 oil paintings, 5,500 watercolors, 2,600 prints, and thousands of drawings. However, he is primarily recognized for his sculpture. His work includes landscapes, portraits, busts, life-size sculptures, monuments, and engravings. Regardless of his medium of choice, his work is characterized by spontaneity; he often preferred to prepare his work with quick sketches on the scene. He felt this made his work more natural as compared to using a model in the studio. He was fairly commercially successful during his life, though he did not find success until his mid-30s. Large commissions for sculptures from the Church of Jesus Christ of Latter-day Saints (LDS Church) were particularly lucrative for him.

Born into a family of rich Mormon pioneer heritage, Young was the grandson of the second President of the LDS Church and first Governor of Utah, Brigham Young. Young was introduced to art by his father at an early age. He quit school at seventeen years old and worked engraving and portrait making jobs at various newspapers in Salt Lake City to make money for art lessons and for art school in New York and later, Paris. He lived most of his life in New York City where he became associated with "The Eight" and the Ashcan School. He ignited his commercial success in New York; however, arguably two of his most famous works, the This Is The Place Monument and the Seagull Monument are featured prominently in Salt Lake City, Utah. One of his other well-known works is a statue of Brigham Young which resides at the Statuary Hall at the United States Capitol Building in Washington, D.C. At various times during his career, Young taught at the Art Students League. Most of Young's work resides at Brigham Young University.

== Early years ==
Mahonri Mackintosh Young was born on August 9, 1877, in Salt Lake City, Utah Territory. He was the oldest child of Mahonri Moriancumer Young, owner of Deseret Woolen Mill which he had inherited from his father Brigham Young, and Agnes Mackintosh. Young enjoyed the time he spent living in rural Utah at the factory; he considered this his "golden age" in Utah. Young was given the name of his father, named after the character Mahonri Moriancumer from the Book of Mormon, widely known as the "Brother of Jared". Moriancumer was omitted due to its peculiarity and was, instead, replaced by Mackintosh, his mother's maiden name. His grandfather, Brigham Young, was the second president of the Church of Jesus Christ of Latter-day Saints (LDS Church), governor of Utah territory in 1851, and director of the Mormon pioneers to Utah. Mahonri Mackintosh was likely the last grandchild born before the death of Brigham Young on August 29 and the last to receive a blessing from him.

Young's mother came from a polygamist marriage in the Midwestern United States. Though she did not meet her father, Daniel Mackintosh until she was older than one, he died when she was three years old and her mother raised her alone. Young's parents had attended the University of Deseret (now University of Utah) together. They married in October 1876 in the Endowment House in Salt Lake City. After their marriage, Agnes's mother Ellen moved into their home. Young's twin brothers, Winfield Scott (Winnie) and Waldemar (Wally) were born on July 1, 1880; they grew to be successful, a newspaperman and a screenwriter respectively. While ill with appendicitis, his father introduced Young to sculpture by carving objects for him out of wood. For his safety, his father gave him clay to model animals, sparking his interest in art at a young age. Young's father died when he was about seven years old. His father's death provided Young with the motivation to become a successful sculptor. His mother never remarried but was forced to sell the factory for less than half its worth due to financial concerns. Despite this, Agnes was able to provide for the living expenses of her family.

His family moved into a small house in Salt Lake City where Young began school. At eleven years old, his mother bought him a woodcarving kit from which he carved a four-inch bas relief of Julius Caesar from a fence post. After seeing the piece, a book salesman called him a "genius", leading his family to call him "the genius". Due to mediocre grades and always feeling behind his classmates, Young quit school after eighth grade. He spent time reading and studying about art, making friends with other young, aspiring artists. His childhood friends included John Held Jr. and Lee Greene Richards. He created his first sculpture when he was thirteen. At a young age, Young found formal education to be a waste of time. Young said that the only thing he learned that was of any value to him was that he should look at the point where a line would end rather than the point of the pencil. However, despite his disinterest in formal education, he read avidly with favorite authors being Ralph Waldo Emerson and Montaigne. Early influences from the Mormon families around him led him to be disinterested in maintaining LDS Church activity. Examples of these influences included abuse of the law of plural marriage and excessive piety among church members.

Young was athletic and participated in baseball and football teams. However, after an injury during a football game, he broke his left arm and after it was incorrectly reset and then rebroken to be properly set, his left arm remained slightly smaller than his right for the entirety of his life. His early interest in athletics influenced the subject of his art, as he often sculpted and depicted athletes competing in various sports, the most prominent sport being boxing. He also developed his interest in nature and bird watching which further influenced themes and subjects of his art. His uncle introduced Young to ranch life, in which he became extremely interested. His mother was adamant that he pursue a different career. Although Young did not become a rancher, themes of ranching and the American West were frequent in his art. Young learned about the art style of Jean-François Millet from reading magazines, which taught him about form, space, light, and movement in art. An article about Millet convinced Young to quit school, get a job, and take art lessons. Determined to become a sculptor, Young realized that he had not sculpted since he was five years old, so he decided he may have better luck being an illustrator.

== Salt Lake City and New York education ==
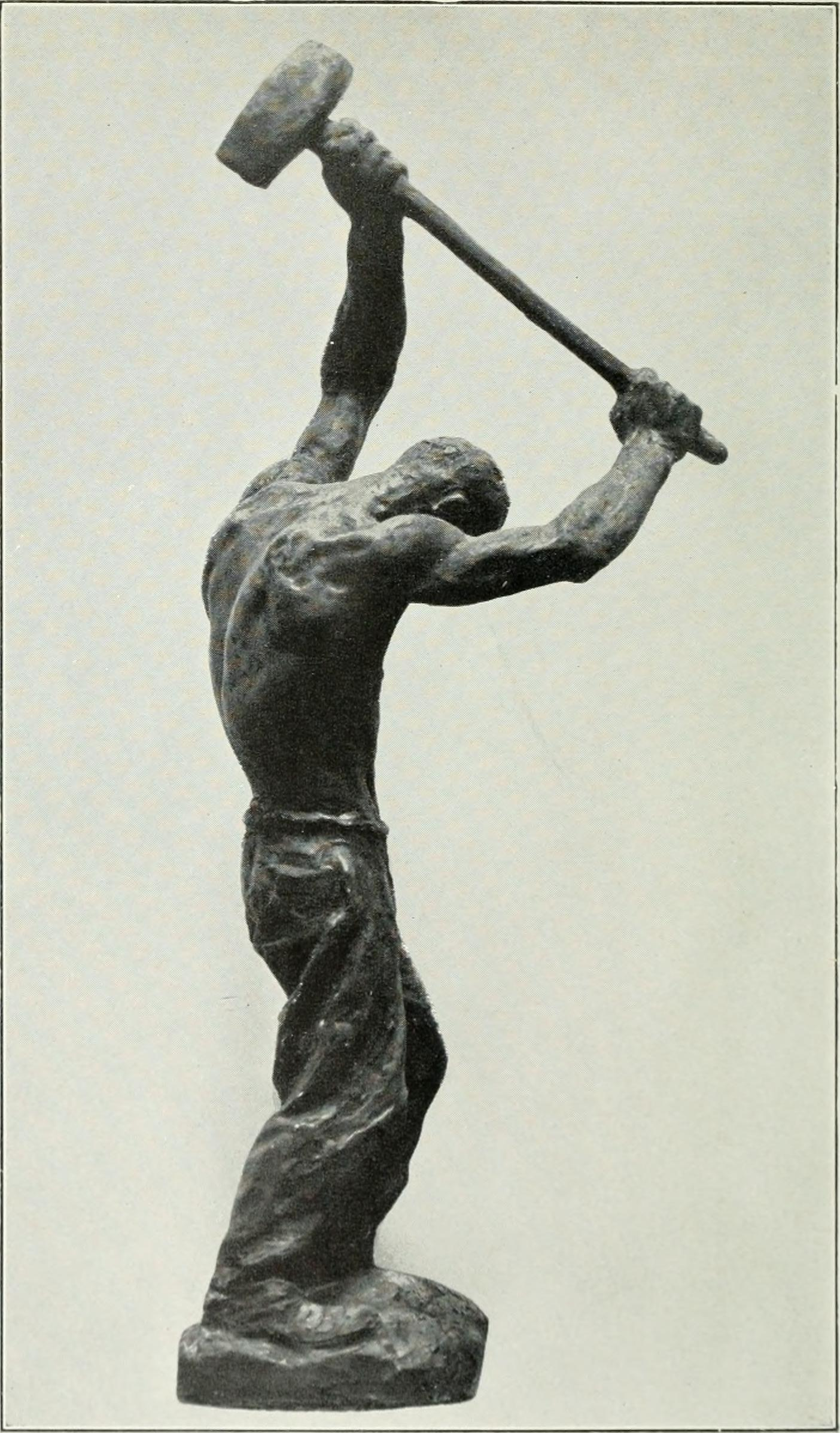
The Heavy Sledge, 1912. Brigham Young University Museum of Art, Provo, Utah

Rather than attend ninth grade, Young chose to pursue an artistic education under local artist James Taylor Harwood, John Hafen, and Edwin Evans. He had initially applied to the University of Utah, but his application was denied because he had not graduated high school. Instead, Young worked in a curio shop and a stationery shop to make money for lessons with Harwood. However, he was delayed in attending lessons due to a necessary appendectomy. Harwood was unimpressed by Young, believing that he was a lazy artist and did not work hard. Young's philosophy, however, was that there is no virtue in working hard, but rather thinking hard. Furthermore, Young liked to quickly sketch an observation which he would later turn into a drawing, but being a traditionalist, Harwood viewed this technique as cheating and an "artistic crime". Although Young had not yet sculpted in class, one day, Young and a classmate sculpted the mask of Laocoön with details from the David and Laughing Faun. Young was not trained in sculpture and had not sculpted since he was five years old. Despite his lack of experience, his instructors praised his sculptures and his natural talent. However, he would not sculpt again until he studied in Paris. Young saved money earned as a Salt Lake Tribune portrait artist, but took his subsequent demotion to an engraver as a blow to his ego.

Using the money he saved, he attended the Art Students League of New York between 1899 and 1901. In New York, Young was fascinated by the Industrial Revolution and decided that he would make art to reflect the themes of the Industrial Revolution. At the Art Students League, Young took classes with George Bridgeman and Kenyon Cox. He began using realist techniques; he would look at artistic models quickly and then attempt to draw his or her memorized features. Although Young disliked Bridgeman as an instructor, Young maintained a spot as second in the class. In contrast, Young greatly admired Cox as an instructor. During his time in New York, he suffered from insomnia, which he attempted to remedy by reading Shakespeare and magazines. Young lived on a tight budget and spent most of his time studying or attending art exhibits. After running out of money, Young had to return to Salt Lake City after eight months instead of his intended nine.

== Paris education ==
In Salt Lake City, Young worked for the Salt Lake Herald as an engraver and did some drawings for Deseret News. Even though he contracted the Spanish flu, Young became manager of the photoengraving shop for the Herald and saved enough money to travel to Paris, France, in 1901 to study at the Académie Julian. Young received extra money to study from his mother who had arranged for a settlement of a part of Brigham Young's estate as well as donations from family and members of the LDS Church.

He studied until 1905, where he studied with Jean-Paul Laurens and Jean-Antoine Injalbert. Unimpressed by the traditional styles taught in Paris, Young did not believe he learned anything at the Académie in France until 1903, when he was able to work more independently and develop his realistic style. He started studying painting and after achieving personal goals painting and after more artistic education from a trip to Italy, he returned to studying sculpture and etching in 1903. Young indicated that one must learn to be thick skinned in class to be able to withstand the criticism of both professors and other students. Most of his instruction in anatomy came from independent study of books. He found that he could not stomach anatomy classes at the Ecole des Beaux-Arts, not because of cadavers, because he had not yet made it to that point in the lectures, but because of the overwhelming stench of un-showered students and sweat which gave him unbearable headaches.

Young's most important etching in Paris was The Forge Rue St. Jacque. It was exhibited in 1903, bringing public attention to Young's etchings. His first original sculptures, The Shoveler and The Man Tired were completed in 1903. Young did not agree with the use of models in his sculpting, because he believed it took away from the naturalness of the piece. For his sculptures, he found that sketches and observation over time made for more natural results and a better depiction of motion. He nervously sent Man Tired and The Shoveler to the American Art Association show in 1903 and achieved great success. His sculptures were featured in the Paris Herald in an article about the American Art Association show. His sculptures were sent to the New Salon in Paris for liberal art, were placed in the main gallery, and received critical acclaim. He spent all of his time looking at art in exhibitions or sketching on the street which garnered him criticism from his classmates for being lazy. Young, however, felt that he could learn more by observing rather than by working and studying in the studio.

During the summer of 1903, Young returned to Salt Lake City, having run out of money. In Salt Lake City, Young continued to sketch. Fortunately for Young, his mother borrowed enough money for him to spend another two years studying in Paris. In New York, on his way to Paris, Young participated in an amateur boxing match and broke his thumb which prevented him from sculpting for a few months, so he attempted water coloring instead. He had some modeled drawings hung in the Paris Old Salon, which led him to experiment drawing with more models. His model Bovet-Arthur was displayed in the New Salon. Young frequently used this man Bovet-Arthur as a model for his work while he was in Paris. Young did a parody piece called The Toilet, but it was never exhibited, and Young destroyed it in 1905. He destroyed some other work that was not accepted to salons. He later admitted regretting destroying his work and never destroyed another piece. (Note: Because Young vowed to never destroy another piece of work, he was devastated when he found his Isis Theatre mural in the dumpster twenty years after he completed it.) Heber J. Grant, president of the LDS European Church mission at the time, gave Young money to cast some of Young's statues in bronze. During his last two years studying in France, he visited galleries and studios of well-known artists. Continuing to develop his style of realism, Mahonri Young was one of the first young American sculptural realists.

== Career ==
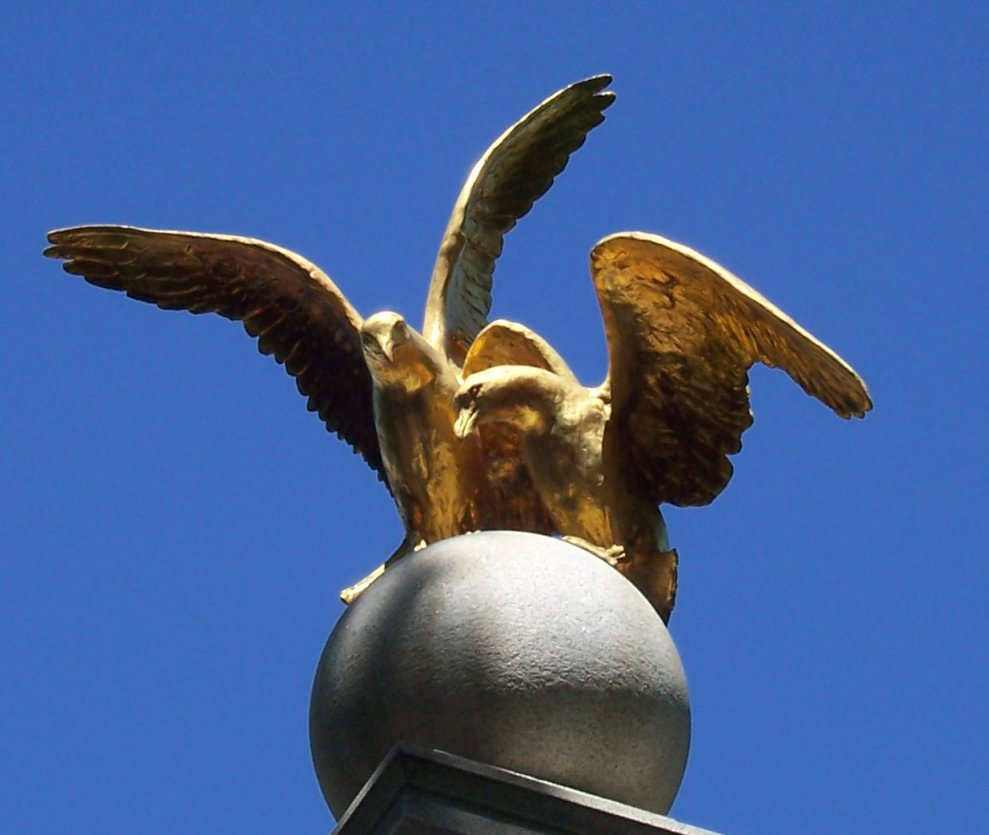
Seagull Monument, 1913. Temple Square, Salt Lake City, Utah

Mahonri Young returned to Utah in 1905, needing to find a way to make a living. Due to his lack of success and financial troubles, Young considered years 1905 to 1910 his "five years of exile". His first commission was a butter sculpture for Frost Creamery for the Utah State Fair called The Dairy Maid. Later, Young established a mildly successful art class at the YMCA, but the class was canceled after one of his students started an art club that took away his students in 1906. He managed to maintain some private lessons. Young hoped to make a commission by making and selling a bust of B.H. Roberts, but he did not have money to bronze it until 1908. However, Robert's first wife refused to buy the bust because it did not adequately portray her husband's personality. Young finally received more commission when he and Lee Greene Richards completed a mural for the Isis Movie Theatre, using themselves as models for the characters. This was the first outside mural done in Utah and the only one done by Young. However, news stories about the murals kept being killed, leading Young to believe there was a conspiracy against realist artists. However, there were few career prospects in the United States, as the art scene was dominated by conservative juries who were unwilling to take a chance on unknown artists and were uninterested in unique or groundbreaking styles. Museums and exhibitionists wanted to showcase academic art and did not want to showcase American art. Consequently, Young found it difficult to sell or exhibit his work in the United States. He found little success during his first five years back in the United States. However, a group of realists called "The Eight" hosted an independent exhibition in 1908 in Philadelphia, igniting the success realist artists could find in the United States.

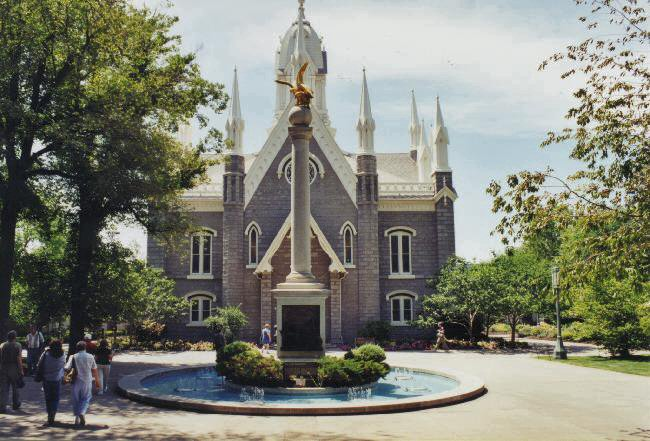
Seagull Monument, 1913. Temple Square, Salt Lake City, Utah

Young improved his reputation by making a bust of Alfred Lambourne. In early 1907, the LDS Church granted Mahonri Young permission to create a life-size sculpture of Joseph Smith, the first president of the LDS Church, using his death mask. After the LDS Church rejected his work, Young offered to redo the piece and make an additional statue of Hyrum Smith, Joseph Smith's brother. These statues were accepted and currently reside on Temple Square. Despite financial troubles, Young married Cecelia Sharp on February 19, 1907. Young had initially seen Sharp while both in Paris where Sharp had been studying piano; they had not yet met and Sharp had to travel back to Utah due to her father's health beginning to fail. In Utah, they attended the same LDS Church where Sharp's father was a bishop, but they had not yet met because Sharp was five years older than Young. Young and Sharp met in 1906 while Sharp was giving private piano lessons in Salt Lake City and fell in love. Young made a bust of Sharp in 1906. Polished and beautiful, the bust was different than anything he created during his career.

Young and Sharp's first child, Cecelia Agnes Young, known as "Agnes" or "Aggie", was born on April 25, 1908. Continually aware of the revolt of "The Eight", Young traveled to New York in 1908 and 1909 to determine whether he could be successful in New York. After he presented an idea to construct a Seagull Monument to the LDS Church, they were excited about the project, but were unable to fund it. He instead sculpted a frieze to go above the LDS Gymnasium. This was the last project he completed in Utah before he moved to New York. Young felt that he could relate to the styles and the goals of "The Eight", so he and his family moved to New York in 1910. In New York, Young was a founding member of the Society of American Etchers. He did not find success until 1912, which was a turning point in his career. In 1911, Young won the Helen Foster Barnett prize for Bovet-Arthur a Laborer, displayed at the National Academy. His first New York exhibition was held in 1912. Stevedore was shown at the Metropolitan Museum in New York. In the same year, Young was elected to the National Academy of Design as an Associate. Moreover, in 1912, Young proposed the Seagull Monument to the LDS Church a second time, stressing the personal importance of the monument to Presiding Bishop of the LDS Church Charles W. Nibley. The LDS Church offered Young a contract for the completion of the Seagull Monument, offering him a $200 per month advance for his living expenses. Mahonri "Bill" Sharp Young was born on July 23, 1911, in New York.

Following the Seagull contract, Young was offered a contract to create art for a Hopi Indian exhibition for the American Museum of Natural History. He visited Arizona, New Mexico, and Utah to get inspiration and then returned to New York to complete the project with his colleague Howard MacCormick. Young was offered some commission to create dioramas for Navajo and Apache tribes as well. The Seagull Monument was unveiled and dedicated on Temple Square on October 1, 1913. A member of the Association of American Painters and Sculptors and because of the similar artistic goals and interests, Young became friends with some members of the Ashcan School and joined them in arranging the 1913 Armory Show, which sought to introduce patrons to new styles and movements in art. The Armory show included realism and introduced more abstract styles such as Cubism. Young disliked abstract art styles. In fact, Young believed the emerging styles of surrealism and abstract expressionism that began to appear later in his life were "a greater threat than Communism". In 1915 Young became a member of The Brooklyn Society of Etchers (Today known as the Society of American Graphic Artists or SAGA). The Society's objective was, as it is today, to advance the fine works of American etchers. Young's six etchings, "Noon", "Ensign Peak", "The Main Digger" (which was listed for $18), "Kite Fliers", "Pavers" and "The Sand Pit" were all exhibited at The Brooklyn Society of Etcher's first exhibition at the Brooklyn Museum, NY in 1916. Also in 1915, he featured nine pieces at the Panama–Pacific International Exposition where he was awarded the silver medal. Young's Apache sculptures were unveiled at the American Museum of Natural History in 1916. Cecelia Sharp died of cancer in 1917 after which Young returned to Paris to continue studying art. He resided in Paris from 1925 to 1927. In Paris, he taught students, one of whom was Mary Tarleton. Tarleton and Young maintained a romantic relationship for a few years. Tarleton, 27 years his junior, confessed her love to Young but refused his many marriage proposals. Their relationship and consistent correspondence came to an end in 1930. In 1923, Young was elected to the National Academy of Design as an Academician. In 1924, Young unveiled his Navajo statues at the American Museum of Natural History in New York.

In 1926, E. W. Marland commissioned a statue of a pioneer woman; he invited twelve artists to submit sculptures to be considered for the monument. Young submitted a sculpture but lost to Bryant Baker. Young considered this the greatest disappointment of his career. Young's statues of Prize Ring boxer bronzes were shown at the Rehn Galleries in New York in 1928, their first exhibition. In 1929, Young crafted a bronze of Joe Gans for Winfield Sheehan, a Fox Film executive at the time. Young married Dorothy Weir, daughter of painter J. Alden Weir on February 17, 1931 and promptly moved to the Weir family farm in Connecticut. Young maintained a studio at the Weir estate which has become Weir Farm National Historic Site. Young first met Weir at 1921 at a dinner to discuss plans for the Phillips Memorial Gallery, one of the books for the gallery was intended to be dedicated to Weir's father. When Young returned to Paris to teach and work on his art from 1925 to 1927, they were reacquainted and became friends. After returning to New York, Young proposed marriage to Weir a few times, but she hesitated having never been married and feeling responsibility to care for her aging stepmother.

In 1932, Young competed in the Art competitions at the 1932 Summer Olympics with eight boxing statues. The Knockdown, which he had sculpted in the 1920s in Paris, won the gold medal for sculpture. In 1934, he began teaching at the Art Students League. The same year, his etching Pont Neuf was featured in Fine Prints of the Year, 1933. In 1941 Life magazine called him "the George Bellows of American sculpture." "Industry" and "Agriculture", a statue of factory worker with tools and a statue of a farmer sharpening his blade, were displayed at the 1939 New York World's Fair. These large sculptures stood at the fair's entrance.

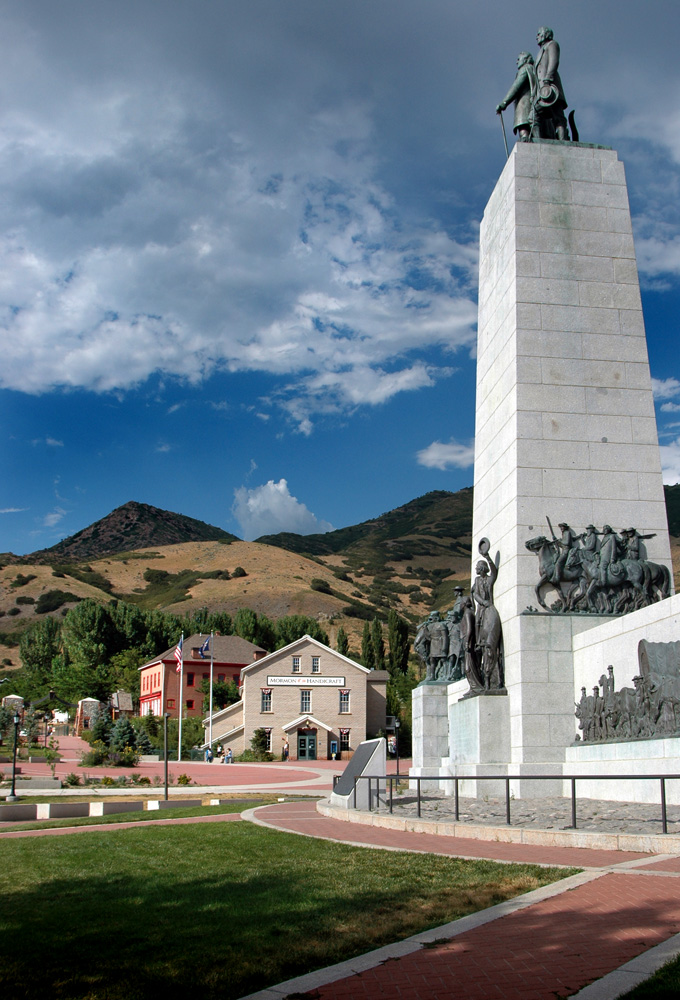
This is the Place Monument, 1947. Salt Lake City, Utah

== This is the Place Monument ==
Mahonri Young had a unique relationship with the LDS Church. Since his teenage years, he did not attend church, follow the Word of Wisdom, or pay tithing to the LDS Church. However, he did admire several LDS Church leaders and was proud of his pioneer heritage. Despite his lack of activity in the LDS Church, he lobbied heavily to work on several projects for the church. Largely considered to be his most important artistic work, Young was especially proud of This Is The Place Monument located at This Is the Place Heritage Park in the foothills of Salt Lake City. The most artistically significant relief on the monument depicts the Donner Party. The monument was intended to commemorate the 100th anniversary of Brigham Young and the Mormons' arrival in the Salt Lake Valley in 1847. As early as 1935, a committee had been chosen to consider artists' proposals of the monument. Young did extensive research and sketching for the project, confident he would be awarded the chance to create the monument. After lobbying the committee for almost five months, he returned to New York, frustrated that he had not yet secured the project. He decided to lobby U.S. senators from Utah to gained federal funding for the project which offended committee member John D. Giles. Giles told Young that he could not give him a contract because they were waiting on funding from the LDS Church; however, Giles was actually stalling time to find a different artist to complete the project. The committee decided to make the monument proposal a competition, which worried Young because of his experience with the Pioneer Woman Competition. John Fairbanks, a younger artist, had already completed prominent statues and memorials for the LDS Church; he was Young's fiercest competition. LDS President Heber J. Grant chose Young's design in 1939, because it highlighted prominent figures Brigham Young, Heber C. Kimball, and Wilford Woodruff rather than a covered wagon, as in the Fairbanks design.

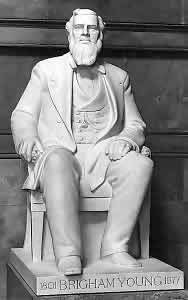
Brigham Young, 1949. National Statuary Hall Collection, United States Capitol, Washington, D.C.

Young was awarded $50,000 to build the monument in 1939 when he was 62 years old. After he was granted the contract, many of the artistic qualities sought by Young were vetoed by representatives from Utah state government, the LDS Church, and descendants of pioneers. For example, Young wanted pioneer leaders in realistic clothing like they would have worn when entering the Salt Lake Valley on July 24, 1847. However, Young's vision of leaders like Brigham Young and Heber C. Kimball in suspenders and bloomers was deemed undignified. Instead, pioneer leaders were portrayed in heavy formal overcoats. Young worked on the statues at Weir farm, assisted by Spero Anargyros. The monument was dedicated on July 24, 1947, on the one-hundredth anniversary of Brigham Young's party reaching the Great Salt Lake Valley. It is the largest sculpted monument in Utah. Even though Young was paid $50,000 for the monument, he believed that he was owed $11,000 extra according to the terms of the contract. He was angry when he was denied the money and eventually became frustrated enough to write to the president of the LDS Church George A. Smith directly. George Q. Morris of the Quorum of the Twelve Apostles severely reprimanded Young for contacting Smith and Young was never paid the extra $11,000. Young resented this alleged contract breach for the rest of his life.

In 1947, Young was elected a member of the American Academy of Arts and Letters. Dorothy Weir died on May 28, 1947. Young continued to live there after her death. His last major work was for the State of Utah. He created a six-foot monument of Brigham Young seated for the Statuary Hall in the United States Capitol Building. The work was unveiled in Washington, D.C., in 1950. He carved this work at the American Academy in Rome, Italy. During a visit to Utah in the same year, he was made an honorary member of the Sons of Utah Pioneers Club. In 1955, Young participated in the Armory Show Commemorative Exhibition in New York City. In January 1957, Young had a serious stroke and in October 1957, he had an ulcer attack. Young died in Norwalk, Connecticut, on November 2, 1957, from the result of bleeding ulcers complicated by pneumonia; he was eighty years old. He was buried in the Salt Lake City Cemetery at the Young family plot, next to Cecelia Young.

== Style and works ==
Although Mahonri Young was taught the classical style which prevailed in the French art institutes of the time, and was surrounded by colleagues who sought to reject the classical style with impressionistic and post-impressionistic styles, Young was disinterested in depicting idyllic or naturalistic images and was more concerned with depicting the realities of life that surrounded him. Consequently, Young's work is often associated with social realism, as his work depicted laborers, immigrants, minorities, the West, and man's interaction with nature. At the time, Young felt isolated by his traditionalist instructors and colleagues who penned Young's work as "dishonest". The size of his work ranged from larger monuments to small sculptures which he typically did in the social realist style. His most recurring subject matter included animals, Native Americans, the boxing ring, ranch life, and laborers. Young greatly admired the work of Cyrus Dallin and Young's work often had parallels to that of Dallin's.

Mahonri Young was versatile in his subject matter and methods, yet his works were united in "powerful elegance". He was proficient in various mediums and techniques such as etching, drawing, watercolor, oil, gouache, and sculpture, which included his lesser known work on medals and reliefs. Even though he is known for his sculpture, he always kept a sketchbook with him and would use pen and ink, oil, and watercolor to depict scenes he saw on the farm. However while art critic, Frank Jewett Mather praised Young's drawings, etchings, and sculpture, he qualified Young's painting as average, suggesting that Young may have commenced painting at too old of an age or perhaps did not approach it with the same effort and care with which he approached his other mediums. Additionally, compared Young's work to that of Jean-François Millet, Honoré Daumier, and Constantin Meunier. Though Young vehemently denied it, some critics accused Young of imitating Millet's work. Young's work, particularly his earlier pieces, was also heavily influenced by Auguste Rodin. Young's sculpture of fighting boxers, Right to the Jaw is characteristic of Rodin's style with its curves and opposing diagonal movements. Young's experience as a sketch artist for the Salt Lake Tribune gave him a spontaneous style that he believed benefited his art. Young excelled in "depicting figures in motion" and "the psychological nuances of gesture". Rather than emphasize light, appearance, and technical skill as had prevailed in traditionalist art, Young preferred to emphasize rhythm, balance, movement, form, and design.

== Legacy ==
Mahonri Young's career lasted more than fifty years with his works displayed in over fifty museums and galleries in the United States and Europe. Upon his death, his estate constituted 320 pieces of sculpture, 590 oil paintings, 5,500 watercolors, 2,600 prints, and thousands of drawings. Young was the first Utah artist to have his work displayed in the Metropolitan Museum of Art in New York. Moreover, Young received nearly every award offered to artists in Utah. The Springville Museum of Art called Young "Utah's most famous New York-based artist". According to the Encyclopedia of Mormonism, Young gained a national reputation for his sculpture and graphic art. Guy Pène du Bois said, "Mahonri Young belongs among...those who of the strain of Michelangelo, Titian, Rubens, Goya, Renoir, and Millet...he is a rare sculptor in America". Young was a member of the American Watercolor Society. In 1940, the Addison Gallery of American Art hosted a retrospective exhibit of Young's various works. In 1999, the Brigham Young University Museum of Art in Provo, Utah opened a year-long exhibition of Mahonri Young's work called "Mahonri: A Song of Joys". The Young family donated over 7,000 various works of Young to Brigham Young University. Additionally, the BYU Museum of Art held an exhibition of Young's work during summer 2019.

== See also ==
- Statues of Joseph and Hyrum Smith
- Technical High School (Salt Lake City)
