= Statue of Brigham Young =

Statue in the United States Capitol

Brigham Young
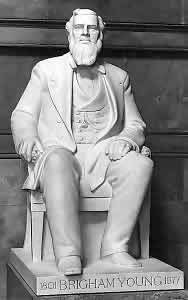
- The statue in the National Statuary Hall Collection
- Artist: Mahonri Young
- Medium: Marble sculpture
- Subject: Brigham Young
- Location: Washington, D.C., United States

Brigham Young is a marble statue by Mahonri Young representing the Mormon religious leader of the same name, installed in the United States Capitol, in Washington D.C., as part of the National Statuary Hall Collection. It is one of two statues donated by the state of Utah, and is unusual in the collection in that Young is portrayed sitting down. The statue was unveiled by Alben William Barkley on June 1, 1950.

== History ==
The commission for the Brigham Young statue was highly sought after, particularly by Young and Avard Fairbanks. The final choice of the sculptor was left to the three surviving daughters of Brigham Young. Young had sculpted Brigham Young before, including him in the central group of the This is the Place Monument unveiled in Salt Lake City in 1947, which the family approved of. They did not like Cyrus Dallin's portrayal of Young. The statue was unveiled in Washington by Mable Young Sandborn, then Brigham Young's last surviving child.
