= Brigham Young: American Moses =

1985 biography by Leonard Arrington

- Dust jacket from the 1985 Knopf edition.
- Author: Leonard J. Arrington
- Language: English
- Subject: Brigham Young
- Genre: Biography
- Publisher: Alfred A. Knopf
- Publication date: April 1985
- Publication place: United States
- Media type: Print (Hardcover)
- Pages: 522
- ISBN: 0-394-51022-4
- OCLC: 11443615
- Dewey Decimal: 289.3/32/0924 B 19
- LC Class: BX8695.Y7 A85 1985
- Followed by: 1986 University of Illinois Press paperback

Brigham Young: American Moses is a biography written by Leonard J. Arrington about Brigham Young, a leader in the Latter Day Saint movement and the second president of the Church of Jesus Christ of Latter-day Saints. Alfred A. Knopf published the book in 1985, and reviewers and historians have called it "the definitive Mormon history" and "necessary reading" for understanding Young's life and character.

== Background ==
Upon becoming the Church Historian of The Church of Jesus Christ of Latter-day Saints (LDS Church), Leonard J. Arrington showed interest in writing a biography of Brigham Young, who had led the church (first as president of its Quorum of the Twelve Apostles and then as its general president) from 1844 until his death in 1877. With an immense amount of manuscript material found in the basement of the Church Administration Building, Arrington proposed a seven-volume biography to the First Presidency. However, Spencer W. Kimball, church president at the time, only approved a one-volume work. Kimball suggested that Arrington take on the biography as a privately funded endeavor in order to spare the Church of direct ties to the work and any potential inaccuracies or misinterpretations. In addition, Kimball told Arrington, "I would like to see a really good, one-volume biography of Brigham Young before I die", thus producing a sense of a deadline.

== Production ==
In 1979, Alfred A. Knopf published Arrington's well-received The Mormon Experience: A History of the Latter-day Saints. Later that year, Knopf contracted Arrington to also write a biography of Brigham Young. Until 1982, Arrington was Church Historian and had access to and drew upon diaries and letters not available to previous biographers to profile Brigham Young. Discovered in the Church Administration Building in the early-1970s, it had taken until 1977 to fully catalog the Young papers. While a large research team was involved in producing the Young biography, church leadership instructed that only Arrington be credited as the author. Arrington completed a first draft of the biography in seven months. The revising process took several years. The church's First Presidency had asked Arrington to submit the manuscript to them for review before submitting it to Alfred A. Knopf, which had agreed to publish it. Knopf released Brigham Young: American Moses in 1985. It was the first Young biography written with complete access to all archived materials produced during the Young era. In the book, Arrington critically examined a major period of Mormon history, though some reviews claimed he didn't cover enough of some intriguing aspects.

=== Conflict ===
As Arrington had contracted many research assistants in his work for the biography, some believed that he gave too little attribution to his contributors. Reviewers of the work thought that Arrington's writing was too dependent on the research of others without giving them proper credit. According to historian F. Ross Peterson, "doing the Brigham Young biography is one of the things that caused a degree of conflict between [Arrington] and his staff at the Church. Some of them felt [the book] was theirs." Out of his entire staff, Arrington supposedly relied very heavily on the work of historian Ronald Esplin, whose research was instrumental in writing the book. In addition to the conflict involving the researching staff, several of Arrington's colleagues in the church's Historical Department believed that he was intentionally obstructing the work of Donald Moorman, who was also working on a biography of Brigham Young at the same time. According to Gene Sessions, an employee of the Historical Division at the time, Moorman wanted to write "definitive biography of Brigham Young," but Arrington "refused to let [him] use the copying machines. [Arrington] said, 'You can see the Young stuff as long as you hand-copy it.'" Arrington's lack of cooperation prevented Moorman from completing thorough research on Brigham Young, despite having been given necessary access to the Young papers by Joseph Fielding Smith, previous Church Historian and church president.

=== Title ===
In an interview with Arrington in 1995, Ken Verdoia asked why he chose the subtitle American Moses. Arrington answered,

Brigham was the same sort of a leader as Moses in serving people for a long period of time, in achieving their goal of entering into a kingdom blessed by God ... there's ... no trick reason why I should have used American Moses. I thought Moses was a person understood by nearly everybody, and that Brigham was something for us that Moses was for the people of Israel. He led his people figuratively and quite literally, and they survived because of that leadership and their faith.

== Reception ==
Brigham Young: American Moses was critically acclaimed within the Latter-day Saint community. Many considered it "the definitive Mormon History". Scholars outside Latter-day Saint circles also praised American Moses for its rigor and breadth. In Reviews in American History, historian Martin Ridge wrote that American Moses "meets the highest standards of scholarship. Arrington writes Mormon history at its best." Reviewers continued to praise American Moses into the twenty-first century. In 2012, online review magazine Blogcritics described the book favorably as being "the definitive study of the man [Brigham Young] and is highly recommended." In her chapter in the 2015 Oxford Handbook of Mormonism, historian Jan Shipps considered American Moses "necessary reading for understanding the origin, character, and life of the 'lion of the Lord.'" John G. Turner, author of a 2012 biography of Young, described American Moses as a "rich portrait of Brigham Young" which "captures the playful, astute, and humorous sides of Young's personality, as well as his faith and persistence."

Nevertheless, in his biography of Arrington, Gregory Prince contends there was "a general critique" of American Moses "that Leonard [Arrington] had pulled too many punches" because he admired Young. In her 1986 review, Shipps assessed American Moses as being "not a sanitized official biography" and wrote it "includes more than enough information to fill out a 'warts and all' portrait that clarifies Young's position in Mormon and American history." However, in her assessment, American Moses underplayed Young's directive style of leadership and his religious charismata. Shipps concluded, "As otherwise informative and valuable as is this work [American Moses], in that area it presents a serious misreading of the life and times of the 'Lion of the Lord.'" Meanwhile, reviewer Harold T. Muir believed Arrington's treatment of the Mountain Meadows Massacre was insufficient. Muir agreed with Arrington that "The charge that Young ordered or somehow 'inspired' the massacre is so far fetched and based on such tortuous logic that Arrington cannot be blamed for ignoring it," but he criticized American Moses for lacking detail about the aftermath of the massacre and the extent of Young's involvement in impeding federal investigations. According to Arrington's colleague Robert Kent Fielding, Arrington "said no, he was not going to deal with [the Massacre]. He was going to leave that for other scholars."

== Awards ==
In 1984, before its actual release by Knopf, Brigham Young: American Moses was the first to receive the prestigious "David Evans and Beatrice Cannon Evans Biography Award". It also won the 1985 Mormon History Association’s Best Book Award and was nominated as a “distinguished work of biography” by the National Book Critics Circle.

== Contents ==
Table of Contents

1. Boyhood in Vermont and New York
2. Conversion and Commitment
3. Apostle
4. The Missouri Interlude
5. The British Mission
6. Nauvoo
7. City of Joseph
8. The Pioneer Trek to the great Basin
9. To Zion
10. The Colonizer President
11. President of the Church
12. Friendship and Caution
13. Governor of Utah
14. Zion Grows
15. Governor and Counselor
16. Public Image and Private Reality
17. Protecting the Kingdom
18. The Last Year
19. The Legacy of Brigham Young
