= Brigham Young =

American religious leader (1801–1877)

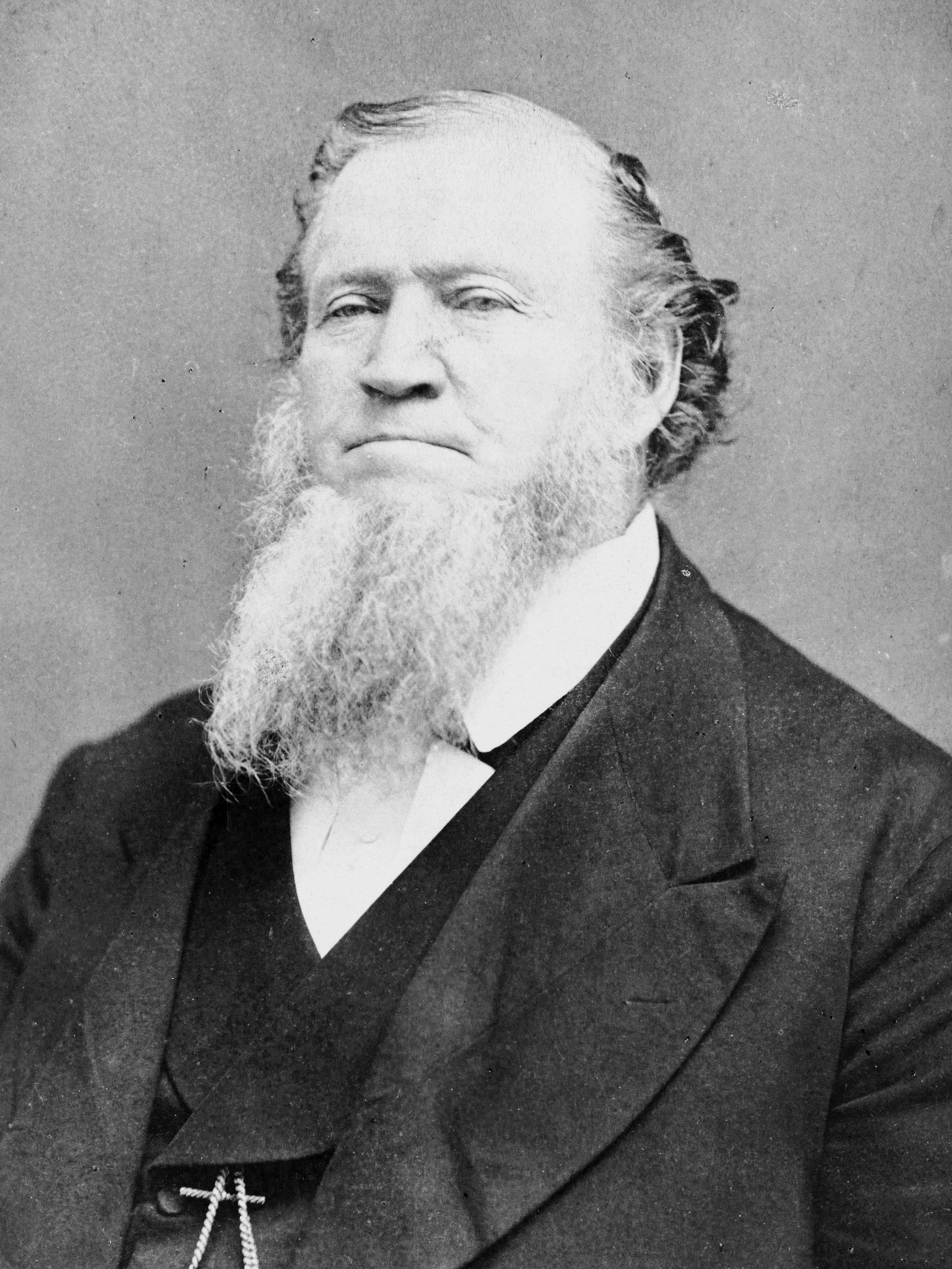
- Young, c. 1865

2nd President of the Church of Jesus Christ of Latter Day Saints (Note: Spelled unhyphenated until 1851.)
- December 27, 1847 – August 29, 1877
- Predecessor: Joseph Smith (Note: A succession crisis followed after the killing of Joseph Smith in 1844. Several people claimed succession as President of the Church, including Young himself, who was selected to the position in 1847.)
- Successor: John Taylor

President of the Quorum of the Twelve Apostles
- April 14, 1840 – December 27, 1847
- Predecessor: Thomas B. Marsh
- Successor: Orson Hyde
- End reason: Became President of the Church

Quorum of the Twelve Apostles
- February 14, 1835 – December 27, 1847
- Called by: Three Witnesses
- End reason: Became President of the Church

LDS Church Apostle
- February 14, 1835 – August 29, 1877
- Called by: Three Witnesses
- Reason: Initial organization of Quorum of the Twelve
- Reorganization at end of term: No apostles immediately ordained (Note: A year after Young's death, Orson Hyde died and Moses Thatcher was ordained an apostle. The First Presidency was not reorganized until October 10, 1880, after which Francis M. Lyman and John Henry Smith were ordained. Orson Pratt died in 1881, and the Quorum of the Twelve did not have twelve members again until October 16, 1882, when George Teasdale and Heber J. Grant were ordained.)

1st Governor of Utah Territory

In office
- February 3, 1851 – April 12, 1858
- Predecessor: Position established
- Successor: Alfred Cumming

Personal details
- Born: June 1, 1801; Whitingham, Vermont, U.S.
- Died: August 29, 1877 (aged 76); Salt Lake City, Utah Territory, U.S.
- Cause of death: Ruptured appendix
- Resting place: Brigham Young Cemetery; 40.7703°N 111.8856°W
- Spouse(s): 56 (See List of Brigham Young's wives) (Note: Estimates vary, and researchers state that not all of the fifty-six marriages were sexual relationships. Young did not live with a number of his wives or publicly hold them out as wives, which has led to confusion on the number and their identities. One source from BYU, the LDS Church's largest university, estimates that thirty-one of his marriages were eternity-only ceremonies that did not involve sex.)
- Children: 57
- Signature

Brigham Young (/ˈbrɪɡəm/ BRIG-əm; June 1, 1801 – August 29, 1877) was an American religious leader and politician. He was the second president of the Church of Jesus Christ of Latter-day Saints (LDS Church) from 1847 until his death in 1877. He also served as the first governor of the Utah Territory from 1851 until his resignation in 1858.

Young was born in 1801 in Whitingham, Vermont, and raised in Upstate New York. After working as a painter and carpenter, he became a full-time LDS Church leader in 1835. Following a short period of service as a missionary, he moved to Missouri in 1838. Later that year, Missouri governor Lilburn Boggs signed the Mormon Extermination Order, and Young organized the migration of the Latter Day Saints from Missouri to Illinois, where he became an inaugural member of the Council of Fifty. In 1844, while he was traveling to gain support for Joseph Smith's presidential campaign, Smith was killed by a mob, igniting the Illinois Mormon War and triggering a succession crisis in the Latter Day Saint movement. After negotiating a ceasefire, Young was unanimously elected as the church's second president in 1847. During the Mormon exodus, Young led his followers west from Nauvoo, Illinois, via the Mormon Trail to the Salt Lake Valley. Once settled in Utah, he ordered the construction of numerous temples, including the Salt Lake Temple. He also formalized the prohibition of black men attaining priesthood and directed the Mormon Reformation. An advocate for education, Young sought to establish the higher education institutions that would later become the University of Utah and Brigham Young University.

After arriving in Utah, Young founded Salt Lake City and established the State of Deseret before being appointed Utah's first territorial governor by President Millard Fillmore in 1850. As governor, Young allowed polygamy, supported slavery and its expansion into Utah, and led the efforts to legalize and regulate slavery in the 1852 Act in Relation to Service, based on his beliefs on slavery. He exerted considerable power over the territory through his theocratic political system, theodemocracy. After President James Buchanan appointed a new governor of the territory, Young declared martial law and re-activated the Nauvoo Legion, beginning the Utah War. During the conflict, the Utah Territorial Militia committed a series of attacks that resulted in the mass murder of at least 120 members of the Baker–Fancher immigrant wagon train, known as the Mountain Meadows Massacre. The following month, the Aiken massacre was perpetrated on Young's orders. In 1858, the war ended when Young surrendered, agreeing to resign as governor and allow federal troops to enter the Utah Territory in exchange for a pardon granted to Mormon settlers from President Buchanan.

A polygamist, Young had 56 wives and 57 children. His teachings are contained in the 19 volumes of transcribed and edited sermons in the Journal of Discourses. His legacy and impact are seen throughout the American West, including numerous memorials, temples, and schools named in his honor. In 2016, Young was estimated to have around 30,000 descendants.

== Early life ==
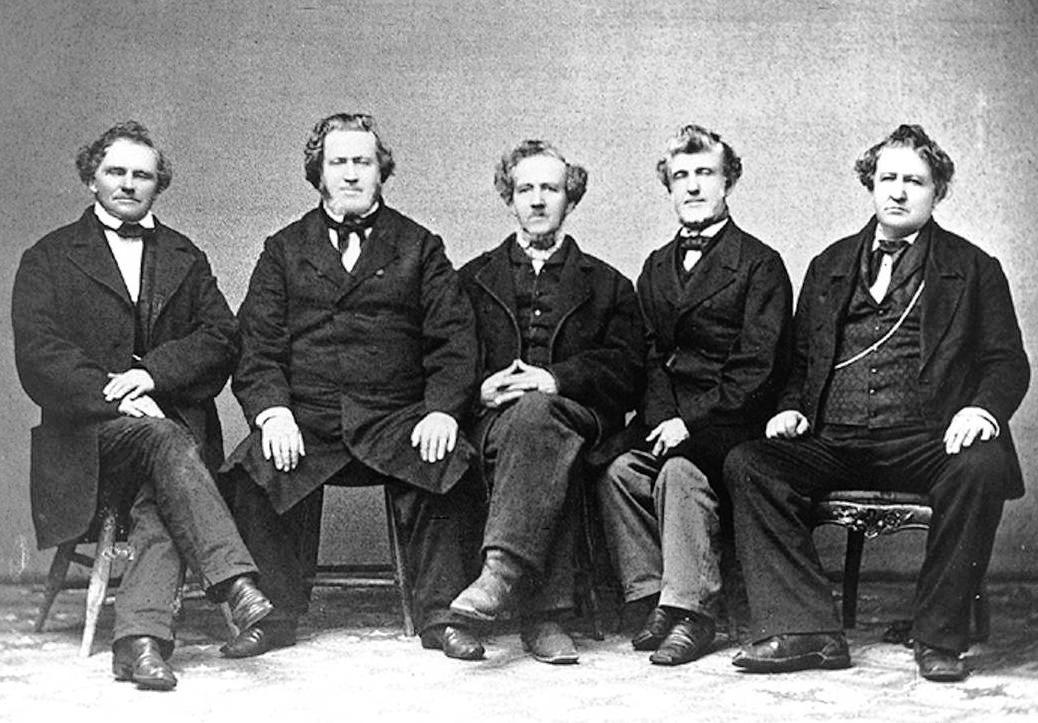
The five sons of John and Abigail Young. From left to right: Lorenzo Dow, Brigham, Phineas H., Joseph, and John.

Young was born on June 1, 1801, in Whitingham, Vermont. He was the ninth child of John Young and Abigail "Nabby" Howe. Young's father was a farmer, and when Young was three years old his family moved to upstate New York, settling in Chenango County. Young received little formal education, but his mother taught him how to read and write. At age twelve, he moved with his parents to the township of Genoa, close to Cayuga Lake. His mother died of tuberculosis in June 1815. Following her death, he moved with his father to Tyrone, New York.

While there, Young's father remarried to a widow named Hannah Brown and sent Young off to learn a trade. Young moved to Auburn, New York, where he was an apprentice to John C. Jeffries. He worked as a carpenter, glazier, and painter. One of the homes that Young helped paint in Auburn belonged to Elijah Miller and later to William Seward, and is now a local museum. With the onset of the Panic of 1819, Jeffries dismissed Young from his apprenticeship, and Young moved to Port Byron, which was then called Bucksville. Young reported having a strict Puritan-style Christian upbringing. He used tobacco but did not drink alcohol. He refused to sign a temperance pledge, however, stating that "if I sign the temperance pledge I feel that I am bound, and I wish to do just right, without being bound to do it; I want my liberty."

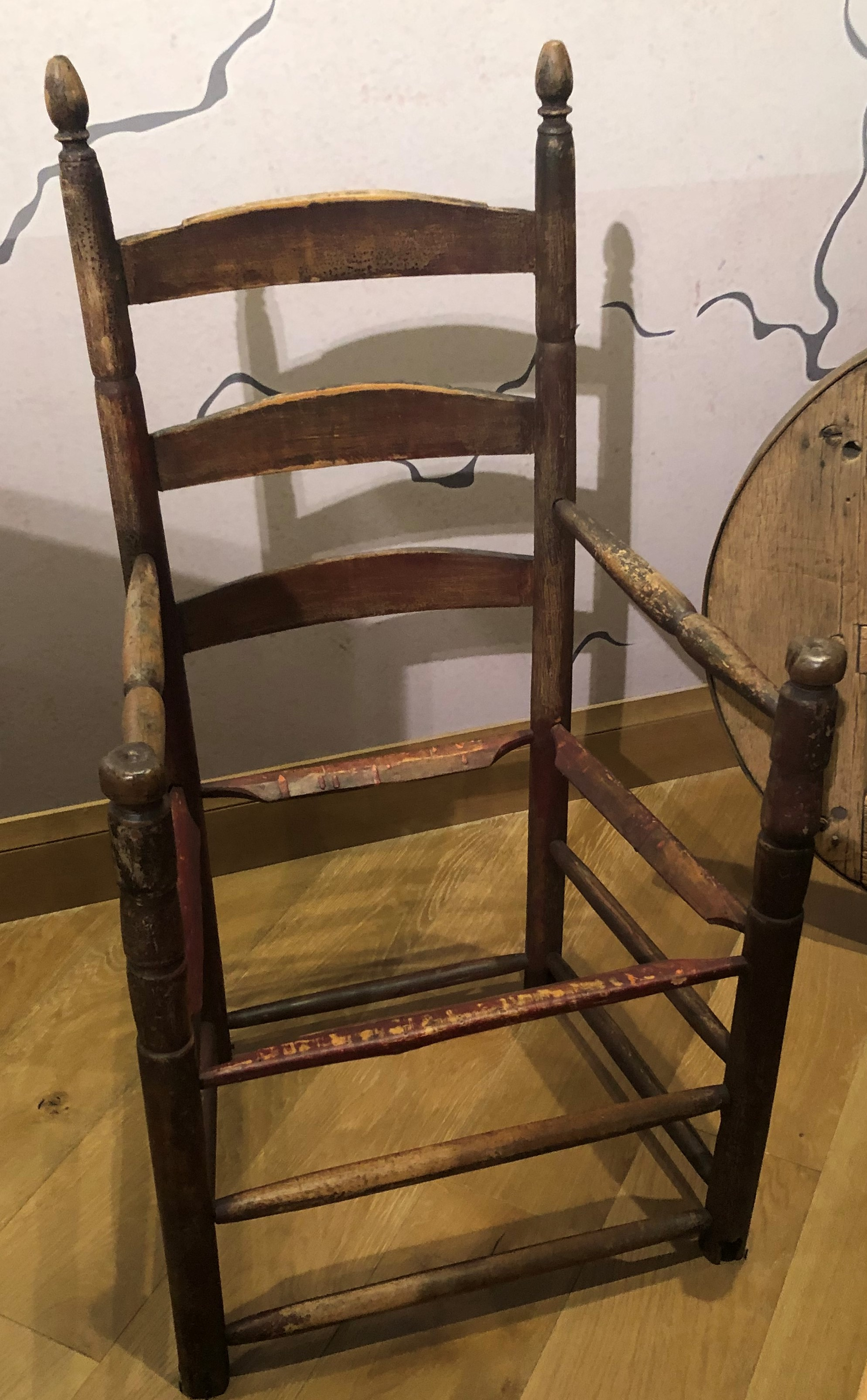
Chair made by Young, who was a carpenter early in his life

Young married Miriam Angeline Works, whom he had met in Port Byron in October 1824. They first resided in a small house adjacent to a pail factory, which was Young's main place of employment at the time. Their daughter, Elizabeth, was born on September 26, 1825. According to William Hayden, Young participated in the Bucksville Forensic and Oratorical Society. Young converted to the Reformed Methodist Church in 1824 after studying the Bible. Upon joining the Methodists, he insisted on being baptized by immersion rather than by their normal practice of sprinkling. In 1828, the family moved briefly to Oswego, New York, on the shore of Lake Ontario, and in 1828 to Mendon, New York. Young's father, two brothers, and sister had already moved to Mendon. In Mendon, Young first became acquainted with Heber C. Kimball, an early member of the LDS Church. Young worked as a carpenter and joiner, and built and operated a saw mill.

=== Latter Day Saint conversion ===
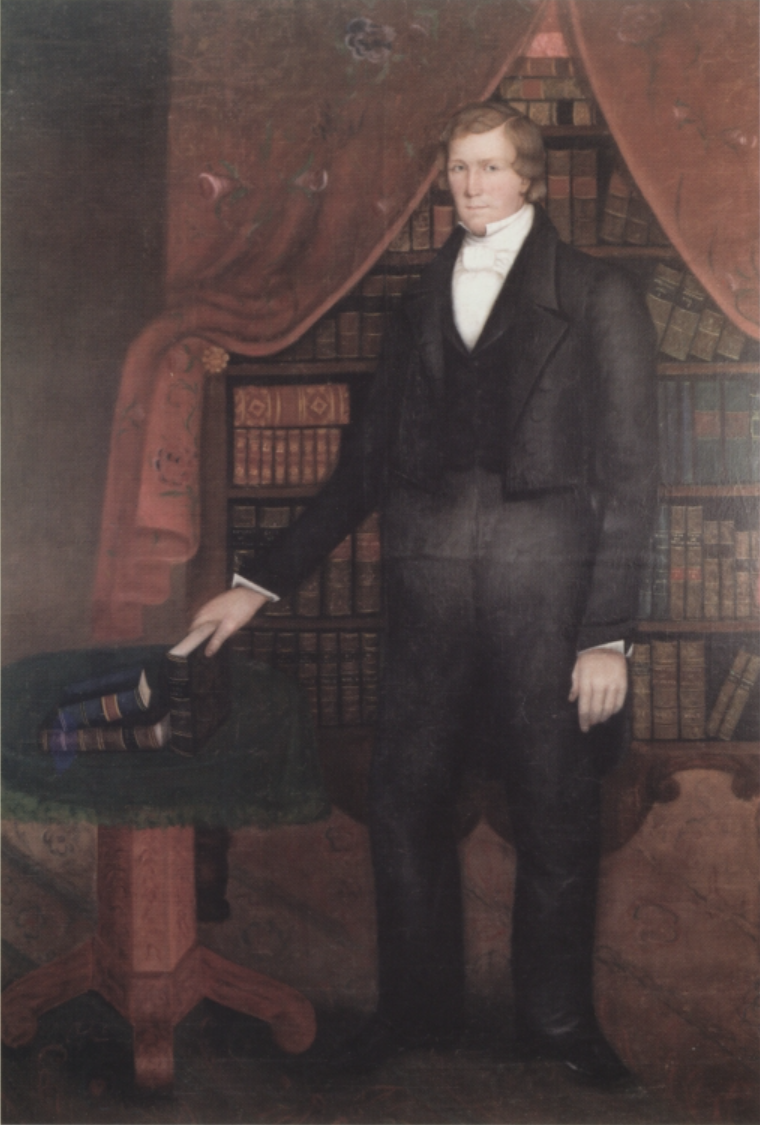
1845 portrait displayed in the Nauvoo Temple celestial room. Young titled the painting, Delivering the Law of the Lord. On the table are a Book of Mormon and Bible, and a third book titled, "Law of the Lord,"

By the time Young moved to Mendon in 1828, he had effectively left the Reformed Methodist Church and become a Christian seeker, unconvinced that he had found a church possessing the true authority of Jesus Christ. Sometime in 1830, Young was introduced to the Book of Mormon by way of a copy that his brother, Phineas Howe, had obtained from Samuel H. Smith. Young did not immediately accept the divine claims of the Book of Mormon. In 1831, five missionaries of the Latter Day Saint movement—Eleazer Miller, Elial Strong, Alpheus Gifford, Enos Curtis, and Daniel Bowen—came from the branch of the church in Columbia, Pennsylvania, to preach in Mendon. A key element of the teachings of this group in Young's eyes was their practicing of spiritual gifts like speaking in tongues and prophecy. This was partly experienced when Young traveled with his wife, Miriam, and Heber C. Kimball to visit the branch of the church in Columbia.

After meeting Joseph Smith, Young joined the Church of Christ on April 9, 1832. He was baptized by Eleazer Miller. Young's siblings and their spouses were baptized that year or the year afterwards. In April 1832, a branch of the church was organized in Mendon; eight of the fifteen families were Youngs. There, Young saw Alpheus Gifford speak in tongues, and in response, Young also spoke in tongues. Young and Kimball spent the summer following their baptism conducting missionary work in western New York, while Vilate Kimball cared for Young's family. After Miriam died of consumption, Vilate continued to care for Brigham's children while he, Heber, and Joseph Young traveled to visit Joseph Smith in Kirtland, Ohio. During the visit, Brigham spoke in a tongue that Smith identified as the "Adamic language".

After visiting Joseph Smith in Kirtland, Brigham set out to preach with his brother Joseph in the winter of 1832–1833. Joseph had been a Reformed Methodist preacher and the two made a similar "preaching circuit" in eastern Canada. They described the Book of Mormon as the "stick of Joseph", mentioned in Ezekiel 37. Young continued to preach in eastern Canada in the spring and accompanied two Canadian converts to Kirtland in July 1833. Young and his two daughters moved to Kirtland along with the Kimball family later that summer. Here he became acquainted with Mary Ann Angell, a convert to the faith from Rhode Island, and the two were married in February 1834 and obtained a marriage certificate on March 31, 1834. (Note: Sources list February 18 as the marriage date, while another lists it as February 10.)

In May 1834, Young became a member of Zion's Camp and traveled to Missouri. He returned to Kirtland with members of the camp in August. After his return to Kirtland, Young did carpentry, painting, and glazing work to earn money. He also worked on the Kirtland Temple and went to a grammar school. His third child and first son, Joseph A. Young, was born shortly after his return. Mary Ann, who was pregnant at the time, had provided for Young's two daughters and the children of her brother Solomon Angell and their friend Lorenzo Booth while Young was away with Zion's Camp.

== LDS Church service ==
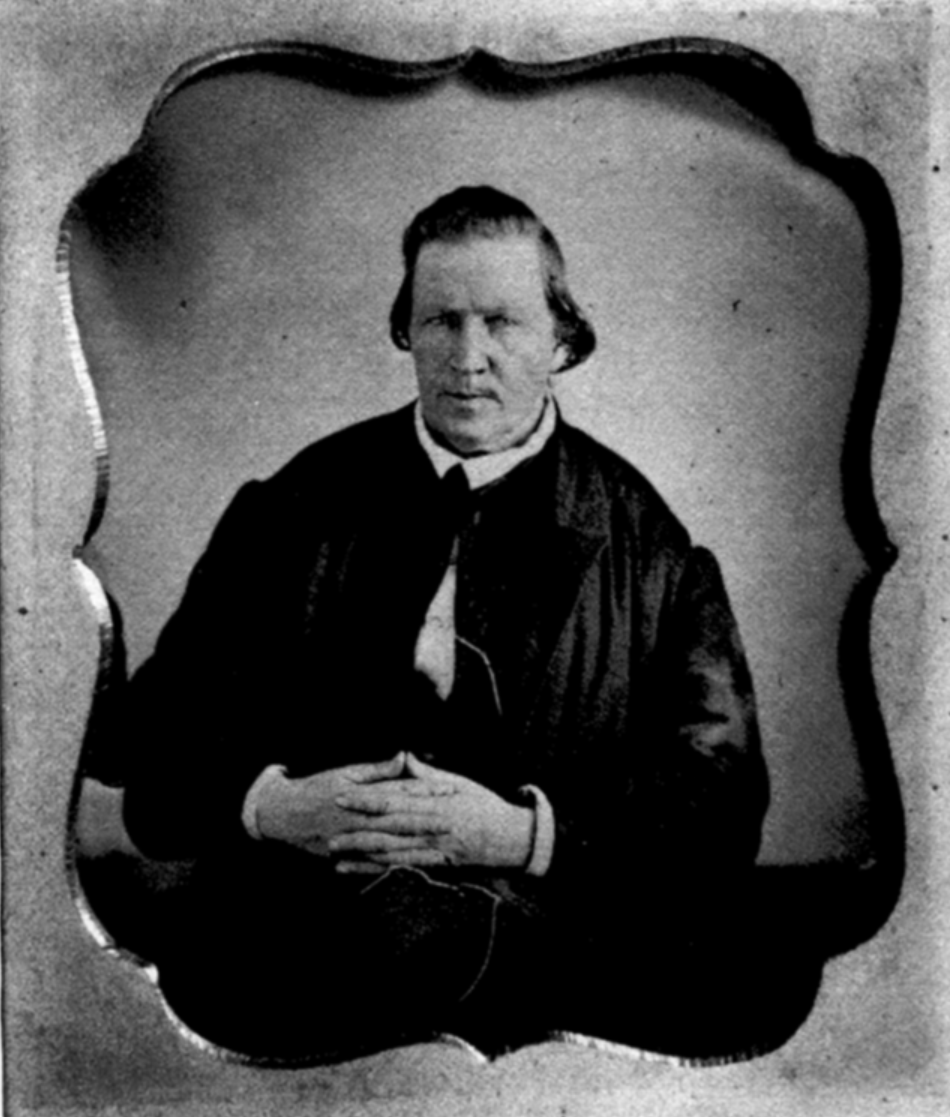
Young, c. 1857

At a conference on February 14, 1835, Brigham Young was named and ordained a member of the Quorum of the Twelve Apostles. On May 4, 1835, Young and other apostles went on a mission to the east coast, specifically in Pennsylvania and New York. His call was to preach to the "remnants of Joseph", a term people in the church used to refer to indigenous people. In August 1835, Young and the rest of the Quorum of the Twelve issued a testimony in support of the divine origin of the Doctrine and Covenants. He oversaw the finishing of the Kirtland temple and spoke in tongues at its dedication in 1836. Shortly afterwards, Young went on another mission with his brother Joseph to New York and New England. On this mission, he visited the family of his aunt, Rhoda Howe Richards. They converted to the church, including his cousin Willard Richards. In August 1837, Young went on another mission to the eastern states. He then returned to Kirtland where he remained until dissenters, unhappy with the failure of the Kirtland Safety Society, forced him to flee the community in December 1837. He then stayed for a short time in Dublin, Indiana, with his brother Lorenzo before moving to Far West, Missouri, in 1838. He was later joined by his family and by other members of the church in Missouri. He became the oldest member of the Quorum of the Twelve Apostles when David Patten died after the Battle of Crooked River. When Joseph Smith arrived in Far West, he appointed Young, along with Thomas Marsh and David Patten, as "presidency pro tem" in Missouri.

Under Young's direction, the quorum organized the exodus of Latter Day Saints from Missouri to Illinois in 1838. Young also served a year-long mission to the United Kingdom. There, he showed a talent for organizing the church's work and maintaining good relationships with Joseph Smith and the other apostles. Under his leadership, members in the United Kingdom began publishing Millennial Star, a hymnal, and a new edition of the Book of Mormon. Young also served in various leadership and community organization roles among church members in Nauvoo. He joined the Nauvoo city council in 1841 and oversaw the first baptisms for the dead in the unfinished Nauvoo temple. He joined the Masons in Nauvoo on April 7, 1842, and participated in an early endowment ritual led by Joseph Smith that May and became part of the Anointed Quorum. Young and the other apostles directed the church's missionary work and the immigration of new converts from this point forward. Young served another mission to the Eastern seaboard.

During his time in Nauvoo, Joseph Smith introduced the doctrine of plural marriage among church leaders. Young performed the sealing ordinances for two of Joseph Smith's plural wives in early 1842. Young proposed marriage to Martha Brotherton, who was seventeen years old at the time and had recently immigrated from Manchester, England. Brotherton signed an affidavit saying that she had been pressured by Young and then Smith to accept polygamy. The affidavit was created at John C. Bennett's request, after his excommunication and in conjunction with his distribution of false information combined with true information about the church's practice of polygamy. Brigham Young and William Smith discredited Brotherton's character, and Brotherton herself did not associate with the church afterwards. Young campaigned against Bennett's allegations that Joseph Smith practiced "spiritual wifery"; Young knew of Smith's hidden practice of polygamy. He also helped to convince Hyrum to accept polygamy.

Young married Lucy Ann Decker in June 1842, making her his first plural wife. Young knew her father, Isaac Decker, in New York. Lucy was still married to William Seeley when Young married her. Young supported her and her two children while they lived in their own home in Nauvoo. Lucy and Young had seven children together. Young was one of the first men in Nauvoo to practice polygamy, and he married more women than any other polygamist while in Nauvoo. While in Nauvoo, he married Clarissa Decker, Clarissa Ross, Emily Dow Partidge, Louisa Beaman, Margaret Maria Alley, Emmeline Free, Margaret Piece, and Zina Diantha Huntington. These wives bore him children after they moved to Utah. He also married in Nauvoo, but did not have children with Augusta Adams Cobb, Susannah Snively, Eliza Bowker, Ellen A. Rockwood, and Namah K. J. Carter. Eight of Young's plural marriages in Nauvoo were to Joseph Smith's widows.

Young traveled east with Wilford Woodruff and George A. Smith from July to October 1843 on a mission to raise funds for the Nauvoo temple and its guesthouse. Young's six-year-old daughter Mary Ann died while he was on this mission. On November 22, 1843, Young and his wife Mary Ann received the second anointing, a ritual that assured them that their salvation and exaltation would occur. In March 1844, Brigham Young was an inaugural member of the Council of Fifty, which later organized the Mormon exodus from Nauvoo.

In 1844, Young traveled east again to solicit votes for Joseph Smith in his presidential campaign. In June 1844, while Young was away, Joseph Smith was killed by an armed mob who stormed the jail where he was awaiting trial for the charge of treason. Young did not learn of the assassination until early July. Several claimants to fill the leadership vacuum emerged during the succession crisis that ensued. Church members gathered at a meeting on August 8, 1844, with the intent to choose between two claimants, Young and Sidney Rigdon, the senior surviving member of the church's First Presidency. At the meeting, Rigdon argued no one could succeed Smith and that he (Rigdon) should become Smith's "spokesman" and guardian of the church. Young argued that the church needed more than a spokesman and that the twelve apostles, not Rigdon, had "the fullness of the priesthood" necessary to succeed Smith's leadership. Young claimed access to revelation to know God's choice of successor because of his position as an apostle. The majority of attendants voted that the Quorum of the Twelve was to lead the church. Many of Young's followers stated in reminiscent accounts (the earliest in 1850 and the latest in 1920) that when Young spoke to the congregation, he miraculously looked or sounded exactly like Smith, which they attributed to the power of God. (Note: Historians have come to different conclusions on whether contemporary records support this "transfiguration of Brigham Young" (also sometimes called the "mantle phenomenon") as an authentic experience, whatever its causation. One source is skeptical of the "mantle phenomenon" as historically authentic. Another church source considers the "mantle phenomenon" historically authentic. Van Wagoner argues that of the contemporary accounts, "none ... references an explicit transfiguration, a physical metamorphosis of Brigham Young into the form and voice of Joseph Smith", and that later reminiscences simply parroted each other as "a 'contagious' thought ... spread through the populace to create a 'collective mind'" to uphold the Latter-day Saints' claims of succession from Smith. Jorgensen argues that two 1844 accounts stating respectively that "Elijah's mantle had truly fallen upon the 'Twelve'" and that "Young 'favours Br Joseph both in person, manner of speaking more than any person ever you saw looks like another" (412) provide contemporary "mantle accounts". Jorgensen also notes that the two earliest reminiscences which comprehensively described the "mantle experience" were written in 1850 by Caroline Barnes Crosby and Emily Smith Hoyt, not male priesthood leaders, but women in the church's laity.) Young began acting as the church's president afterwards, though he did not yet have a full presidency. He also led the Anointed Quorum. Young led the church as president of the Quorum of the Twelve until December 5, 1847, when the quorum unanimously agreed to organize a new First Presidency with Young as president of the church. A church conference held in Iowa sustained Young and his First Presidency on December 27, 1847.

Not all church members followed Young. Rigdon became the president of a separate church organization based in Pittsburgh, Pennsylvania, and several other potential successors emerged to lead what became other denominations of the movement.

Before departing Nauvoo, Young focused on completing the Nauvoo temple. After the exterior was completed on December 10, 1845, members received their temple endowments day and night, and Young officiated many of these sessions. An estimated 5,000 members were endowed between December 10, 1845, and February 1846. With the repealing of Nauvoo's charter in January 1845, church members in Nauvoo lost their courts, police, and militia, leaving them vulnerable to attacks by mobs. Young instructed victims of anti-Mormon violence on the outskirts of Nauvoo to move to Nauvoo. Young negotiated with Stephen A. Douglas and agreed to lead church members out of Nauvoo in the spring in exchange for peace. Some Mormons counterfeited American and Mexican money, and a grand jury indicted Young and other church leaders in 1845. When officers arrived at the Nauvoo temple to arrest Young, he sent William Miller out in Young's hat and cloak. Miller was arrested but released when it was discovered he was not Brigham Young. Young himself condemned the counterfeiting. John Turner's biography states: "it remains unclear whether Young [...] had sanctioned the bogus-making operation". The indictment of Young and other leaders, combined with rumors that troops would prevent the Mormons from leaving, led Young to start their exodus in February 1846.

== Migration west ==
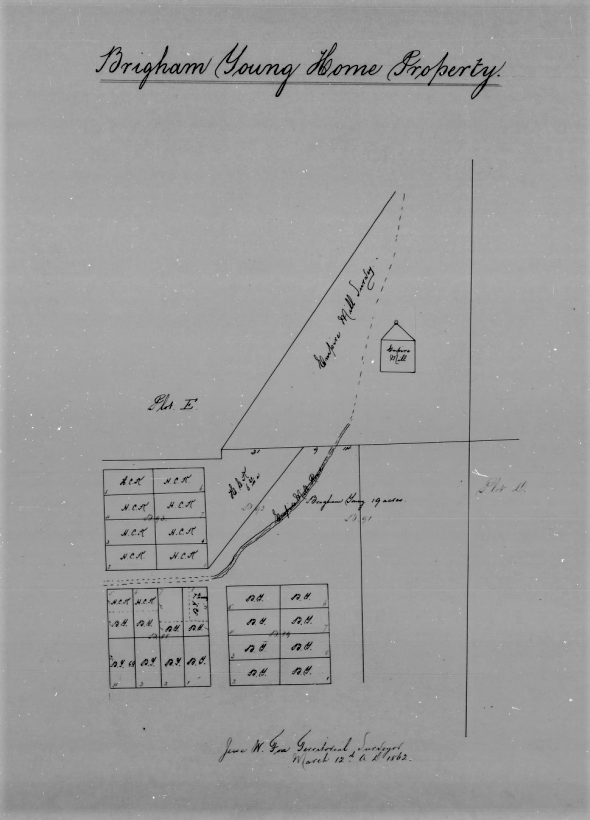
Young's home property, surveyed in 1862

Repeated conflict in Nauvoo led Young to relocate his group of Latter-day Saints to the Salt Lake Valley, which was then part of Mexico. Young organized the journey that would take the Mormon pioneers to Winter Quarters, Nebraska, in 1846, before continuing on to the Salt Lake Valley. By the time Young arrived at the final destination, it had come under American control as a result of war with Mexico, although U.S. sovereignty would not be confirmed until 1848. Young arrived in the Salt Lake Valley on July 24, 1847, a date now recognized as Pioneer Day in Utah. Two days after their arrival, Young and the Twelve Apostles climbed the peak just north of the city and raised the American flag, calling it the "Ensign of Liberty".

Among Young's first acts upon arriving in the valley were the naming of the city as "The City of the Great Salt Lake" and its organization into blocks of ten acres, each divided into eight equal-sized lots. On August 7, Young suggested that the members of the camp be re-baptized to signify a re-dedication to their beliefs and covenants. Young spent just over a month in the Valley recovering from mountain fever before returning to Winter Quarters on August 31. Young's expedition was one of the largest and one of the best organized westward treks, and he made various trips back and forth between the Salt Lake Valley and Winter Quarters to assist other companies in their journeys.

After three years of leading the church as the President of the Quorum of the Twelve Apostles, Young reorganized a new First Presidency and was sustained as the second president of the church on December 27, 1847, at Winter Quarters. Young named Heber C. Kimball as his first counselor and Willard Richards as his second. Young and his counselors were again sustained unanimously by church members at a church conference in Salt Lake City in September 1850.

== Governor of Utah Territory ==
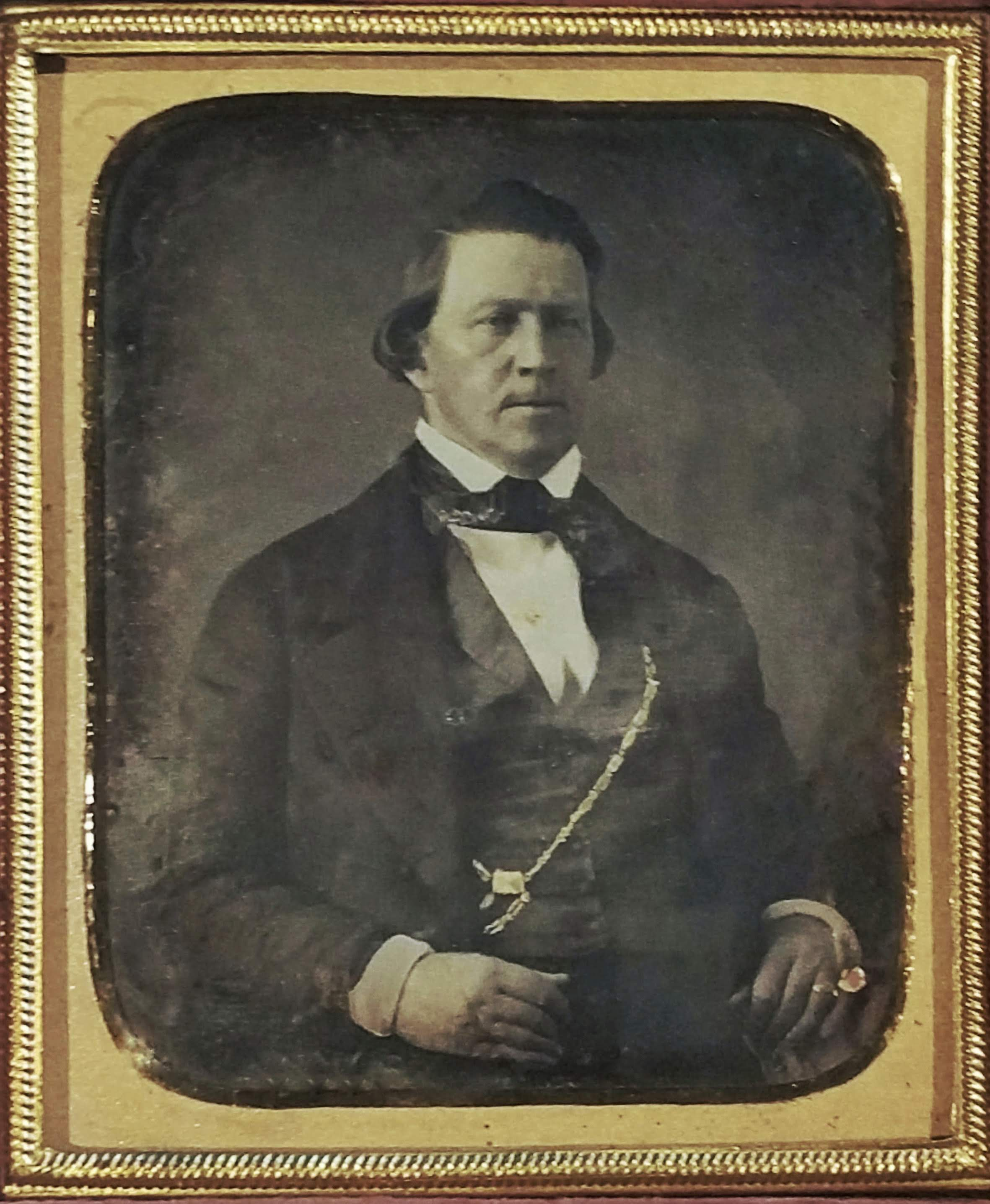
1853 daguerreotype of Young

The Utah Territory was created by Congress as part of the Compromise of 1850. As founder of Salt Lake City, Young was appointed the territory's first governor and superintendent of American Indian affairs by President Millard Fillmore on February 3, 1851. He was sworn in by Justice Daniel H. Wells for a salary of $1,500 a year and named as superintendent of Indian Affairs for an additional $1,000. During his time as governor, Young directed the establishment of settlements throughout present-day Utah, Idaho, Arizona, Nevada, California, and parts of southern Colorado and northern Mexico. Under his direction, the Mormons built roads, bridges, forts, and irrigation projects; established public welfare; organized a militia; issued a "selective extermination" order against male Timpanogos; and after a series of wars, eventually made peace with the Native Americans. Young was also one of the first to subscribe to Union Pacific stock, for the construction of the First transcontinental railroad. He also authorized the construction of the Utah Central railroad line, which connected Salt Lake City to the Union Pacific transcontinental railroad. Young organized the first Utah Territorial Legislature and established Fillmore as the territory's first capital.

Young established a gold mint in 1849 and called for the minting of coins using gold dust that had been accumulated from travelers during the Gold Rush. The mint was closed in 1861 by Alfred Cumming, gubernatorial successor to Young. Young also organized a board of regents to establish a university in the Salt Lake Valley. It was established on February 28, 1850, as the University of Deseret; its name was eventually changed to the University of Utah. In 1849, Young arranged for a printing press to be brought to the Salt Lake Valley, which was later used to print the Deseret News periodical.

In 1851, Young and several federal officials—including territorial Secretary Broughton Harris—became unable to work cooperatively. Within months, Harris and the others departed their Utah appointments without replacements being named, and their posts remained unfilled for the next two years. These individuals later became known as the Runaway Officials of 1851.

Young supported slavery and its expansion into Utah and led the efforts to legalize and regulate slavery in the 1852 Act in Relation to Service, based on his beliefs on slavery. Young said in an 1852 speech, "In as much as we believe in the Bible ... we must believe in slavery. This colored race have been subjected to severe curses ... which they have brought upon themselves." Seven years later in 1859, Young stated in an interview with the New York Tribune that he considered slavery a "divine institution ... not to be abolished".

In 1856, Young organized an efficient mail service known as the Brigham Young Express and Carrying Company, which transported mail and passengers between Missouri and California. In 1858, following the events of the Utah War and Mountain Meadows Massacre, he stepped down to his gubernatorial successor, Alfred Cumming.

== LDS Church president ==
Young served for 29 years as the LDS Church president and is the longest-serving in that role.

=== Educational endeavors ===
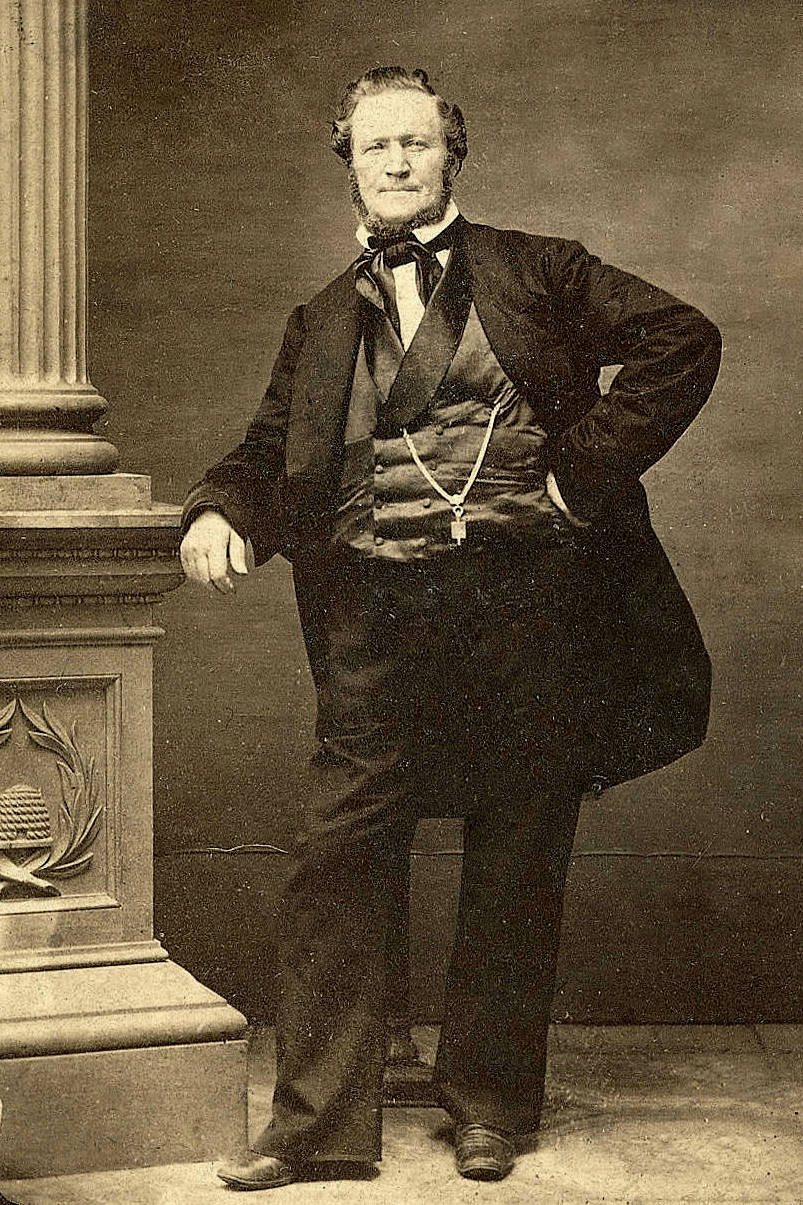
Young photographed by Charles Roscoe Savage, 1855

During time as prophet and governor, Young encouraged bishops to establish grade schools for their congregations, which would be supported by volunteer work and tithing payments. Young viewed education as a process of learning how to make the Kingdom of God a reality on earth, and at the core of his "philosophy of education" was the belief that the church had within itself all that was necessary to save mankind materially, spiritually, and intellectually.

On October 16, 1875, Young deeded buildings and land in Provo, Utah, to a board of trustees for establishing an institution of learning, ostensibly as part of the University of Deseret. Young said, "I hope to see an Academy established in Provo ... at which the children of the Latter-day Saints can receive a good education unmixed with the pernicious atheistic influences that are found in so many of the higher schools of the country." The school broke off from the University of Deseret and became Brigham Young Academy in 1876 under the leadership of Karl G. Maeser, and was the precursor to Brigham Young University.

Within the church, Young reorganized the Relief Society for women in 1867 and created organizations for young women in 1869 and young men in 1875. The Young Women organization was first called the Retrenchment Association and was intended to promote the turning of young girls away from the costly and extravagant ways of the world. It later became known as the Young Ladies Mutual Improvement Association and was a charter member of the National Council of Women and International Council of Women.

Young also organized a committee to refine the Deseret alphabet—a phonetic alphabet that had been developed sometime between 1847 and 1854. At its prime, the alphabet was used in two Deseret News articles, two elementary readers, and in a translation of the Book of Mormon. By 1870, it had all but disappeared from use.

=== Temple building ===
Young was involved in temple building throughout his membership in the LDS Church, making it a priority during his time as church president. Under Smith's leadership, Young participated in the building of the Kirtland and Nauvoo temples. Just four days after arriving in the Salt Lake Valley, Young designated the location for the Salt Lake Temple; he presided over its groundbreaking years later on April 6, 1853. During his tenure, Young oversaw construction of the Salt Lake Tabernacle and announced plans to build the St. George (1871), Manti (1875), and Logan (1877) temples. He also provisioned the building of the Endowment House, a "temporary temple", which began to be used in 1855 to provide temple ordinances to church members while the Salt Lake Temple was under construction.

=== Teachings ===
The majority of Young's teachings are contained in the 19 volumes of transcribed and edited sermons in the Journal of Discourses. The LDS Church's Doctrine and Covenants contains one section from Young that has been canonized as scripture, added in 1876.

==== Polygamy ====
The Community of Christ, considered Young the "Father of Mormon Polygamy". In 1853, Young made the church's first official statement on the subject since the church had arrived in Utah. Young acknowledged that the doctrine was challenging for many women, but stated its necessity for creating large families, proclaiming: "But the first wife will say, 'It is hard, for I have lived with my husband twenty years, or thirty, and have raised a family of children for him, and it is a great trial to me for him to have more women;' then I say it is time that you gave him up to other women who will bear children." Young believed that sexual desire was given by God to ensure the perpetuation of humankind and believed sex should be confined to marriage.

==== Adam-God doctrine and blood atonement ====
One of the more controversial teachings of Young during the Mormon Reformation was the Adam–God doctrine. According to Young, he was taught by Smith that Adam is "our Father and our God, and the only God with whom we have to do". According to the doctrine, Adam was once a mortal man who became resurrected and exalted. From another planet, Adam brought Eve, one of his wives, with him to the earth, where they became mortal by eating the fruit of the tree of knowledge of good and evil. After bearing mortal children and establishing the human race, Adam and Eve returned to their heavenly thrones where Adam acts as the god of this world. Later, as Young is generally understood to have taught, Adam returned to the earth to become the biological father of Jesus. The LDS Church has since repudiated the Adam–God doctrine.

Young also taught the doctrine of blood atonement, in which the atonement of Jesus cannot redeem an eternal sin, which included apostasy, theft, fornication (but not sodomy), or adultery. Instead, those who committed such sins could partially atone for their sin by sacrificing their life in a way that sheds blood. The LDS Church has formally repudiated the doctrine as early as 1889 and multiple times since the days of Young.

==== Race restrictions on temples, priesthood, and interracial marriage ====
Young is generally considered to have instituted a church ban against conferring the priesthood on men of black African descent, who had generally been treated equally to white men in this respect under Smith's presidency. After settling in Utah in 1848, Young announced the ban, which also forbade blacks from participating in Mormon temple rites such as the endowment or sealings. On many occasions, Young taught that blacks were denied the priesthood because they were "the seed of Cain". In 1863, Young stated: "Shall I tell you the law of God in regard to the African race? If the white man who belongs to the chosen seed mixes his blood with the seed of Cain, the penalty, under the law of God, is death on the spot. This will always be so." Young was also a vocal opponent of theories of human polygenesis, being a firm voice for stating that all humans were the product of one creation.

Throughout his time as prophet, Young went to great lengths to deny the assumption that he was the author of the practice of priesthood denial to black men, asserting instead that the Lord was. According to Young, the matter was beyond his personal control and was divinely determined rather than historically or personally as many assumed. Young taught that the day would come when black men would again have the priesthood, saying that after "all the other children of Adam have the privilege of receiving the Priesthood, and of coming into the kingdom of God, and of being redeemed from the four-quarters of the earth, and have received their resurrection from the dead, then it will be time enough to remove the curse from Cain and his posterity."

These racial restrictions remained in place until 1978, when the policy was rescinded by church president Spencer W. Kimball, and the church subsequently "disavow[ed] theories advanced in the past" to explain this ban, essentially attributing the origins of the ban solely to Young.

=== Mormon Reformation ===
During 1856 and 1857, a period of renewed emphasis on spirituality within the church known as the Mormon Reformation took place under Young's direction. The Mormon Reformation called for a spiritual reawakening among members of the church and took place largely in the Utah Territory. Jedediah M. Grant, one of the key figures of the Reformation and one of Young's counselors, traveled throughout the Territory, preaching to Latter-day Saint communities and settlements with the goal of inspiring them to reject sin and turn towards spiritual things. As part of the Reformation, almost all "active" or involved LDS Church members were rebaptized as a symbol of their commitment. At a church meeting on September 21, 1856, Brigham Young stated: "We need a reformation in the midst of this people; we need a thorough reform." Large gatherings and meetings during this period were conducted by Young and Grant, and Young played a key role in the circulation of the Mormon Reformation with his emphasis on plural marriage, rebaptism, and passionate preaching and oration. It was during this period that the controversial doctrine of blood atonement was occasionally preached by Young, though it was repudiated in 1889 and never practiced by members of the church. The Reformation appeared to have ended completely by early 1858.

=== Conflicts ===
Shortly after the arrival of Young's pioneers, the new Latter-day Saint colonies were incorporated into the United States through the Mexican Cession. Young petitioned the U.S. Congress to create the State of Deseret. The Compromise of 1850 instead carved out Utah Territory, and Young was appointed governor. As governor and church president, Young directed both religious and economic matters. He encouraged independence and self-sufficiency. Many cities and towns in Utah, and some in neighboring states, were founded under Young's direction. Young's leadership style has been viewed as autocratic.

==== Utah War ====
When federal officials received reports of widespread and systematic obstruction of federal officials in Utah (most notably judges), U.S. President James Buchanan decided in early 1857 to install a non-Mormon governor. Based on reports from the Runaway Officials, Buchanan appointed the new non-sectarian governor Alfred Cumming and sent him to the new territory accompanied by 2,500 soldiers. When Young received word in July that federal troops were headed to Utah with his replacement, he called out his militia to ambush the federal force using delaying tactics. During the defense of Utah, now called the Utah War, Young stole cattle from the U.S. Army and burned their supply wagons. Young eventually reached a settlement with the aid of a peace commission and agreed to step down as governor. Buchanan later pardoned Young.

==== Mountain Meadows Massacre ====
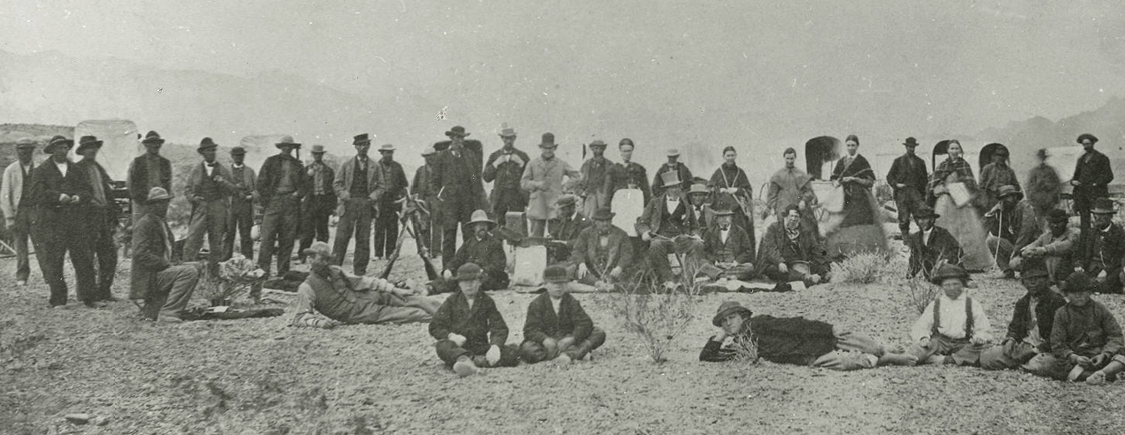
Young (seated near the middle, wearing a tall beaver hat) and an exploring party camped at the Colorado River in 1870

The degree of Young's involvement in the Mountain Meadows Massacre, which took place in Washington County in 1857, is disputed. Leonard J. Arrington reports that Young received a rider at his office on the day of the massacre, and that when he learned of the contemplated attack by members of the church in Parowan and Cedar City, he sent back a letter directing that the Fancher party be allowed to pass through the territory unmolested. Young's letter reportedly arrived on September 13, 1857, two days after the massacre. As governor, Young had promised the federal government he would protect migrants passing through Utah Territory, but over 120 men, women, and children were killed in this incident. There is no debate concerning the involvement of individual Mormons from the surrounding communities by scholars. Only children under the age of seven, who were cared for by local Mormon families, survived, and the murdered members of the wagon train were left unburied. The remains of about 40 people were later found and buried, and U.S. Army officer James Henry Carleton had a large cross made from local trees, the transverse beam bearing the engraving, "Vengeance Is Mine, Saith The Lord: I Will Repay" and erected a cairn of rocks at the site. A large slab of granite was put up on which he had the following words engraved: "Here 120 men, women and children were massacred in cold blood early in September, 1857. They were from Arkansas." For two years, the monument stood as a memorial to those traveling the Spanish Trail through Mountain Meadow. According to Wilford Woodruff, Young brought an entourage to Mountain Meadows in 1861 and suggested that the monument instead read "Vengeance is mine and I have taken a little".

== Death ==
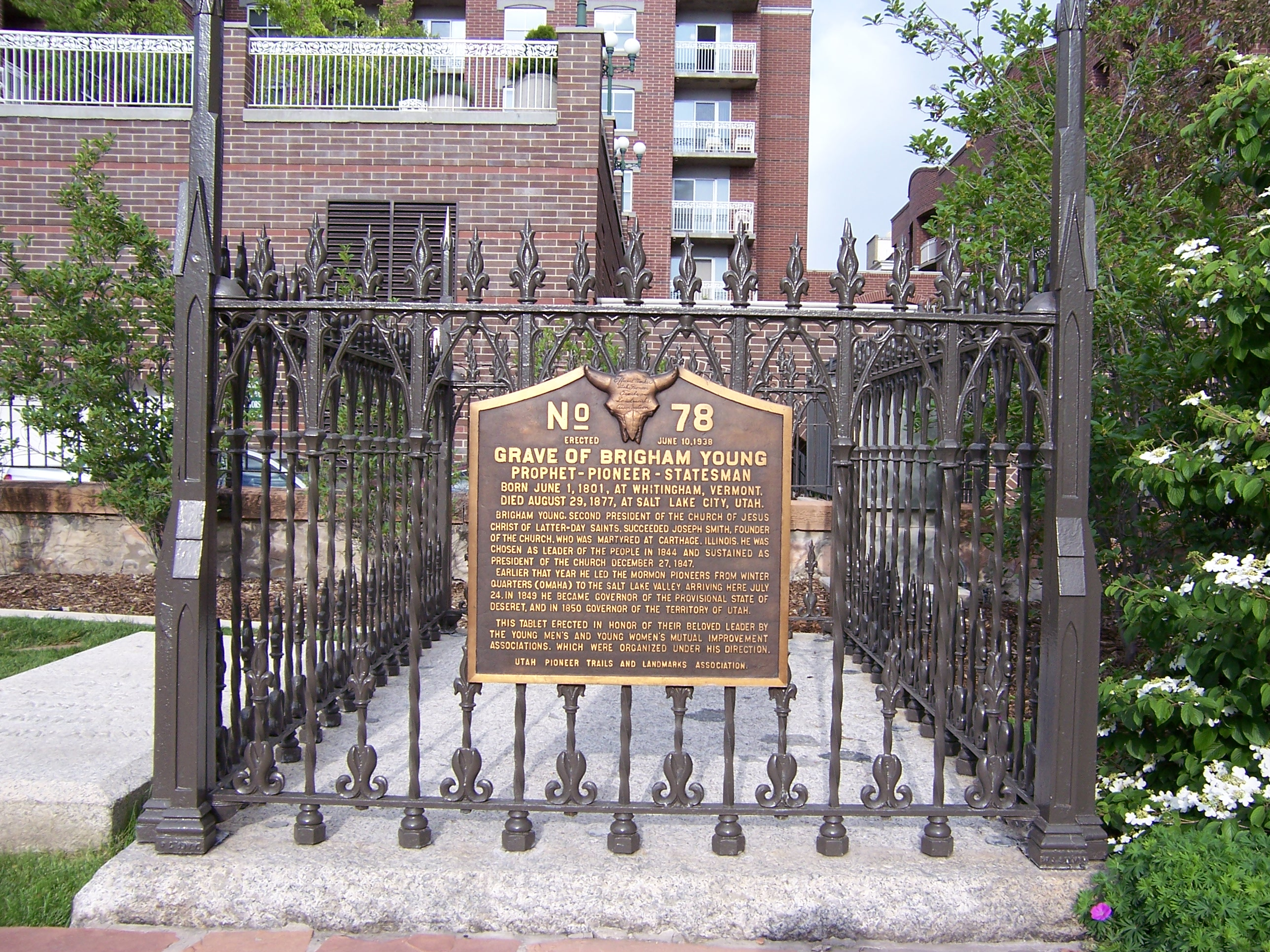
Young is buried on the grounds of the Mormon Pioneer Memorial Monument in Salt Lake City.

Before his death in Salt Lake City on August 29, 1877, Young suffered from cholera morbus and inflammation of the bowels. It is believed that he died of peritonitis from a ruptured appendix. His last words were "Joseph! Joseph! Joseph!", invoking the name of the late Joseph Smith Jr., founder of the Latter Day Saint movement. On September 2, 1877, Young's funeral was held in the Tabernacle with an estimated 12,000 to 15,000 people in attendance. He is buried on the grounds of the Mormon Pioneer Memorial Monument in the heart of Salt Lake City. A bronze marker was placed at the grave site June 10, 1938, by members of the Young Men and Young Women organizations, which he founded.

== Business ventures and wealth ==
Young engaged in a vast assortment of commercial ventures by himself and in partnership with others. These included a wagon express company, a ferryboat company, a railroad, and the manufacturing of processed lumber, wool, sugar beets, iron, and liquor. Young achieved greatest success in real estate. He also tried to promote Mormon self-sufficiency by establishing collectivist communities, known as the United Order of Enoch.

Young was also involved in the organization of the Salt Lake Gas Works, the Salt Lake Water Works, an insurance company, a bank, and the ZCMI store in downtown Salt Lake City. In 1873, he announced that he would step down as president of the Deseret National Bank and of ZCMI, as well as from his role as trustee-in-trust for the church. He cited as his reason for this that he was ready to relieve himself from the burden of "secular affairs".

At the time of his death, Young was the wealthiest man in Utah, with an estimated personal fortune of $600,000 (equivalent to $18,100,000 in 2025).

== Legacy ==
=== Impact ===
Memorials to Brigham Young

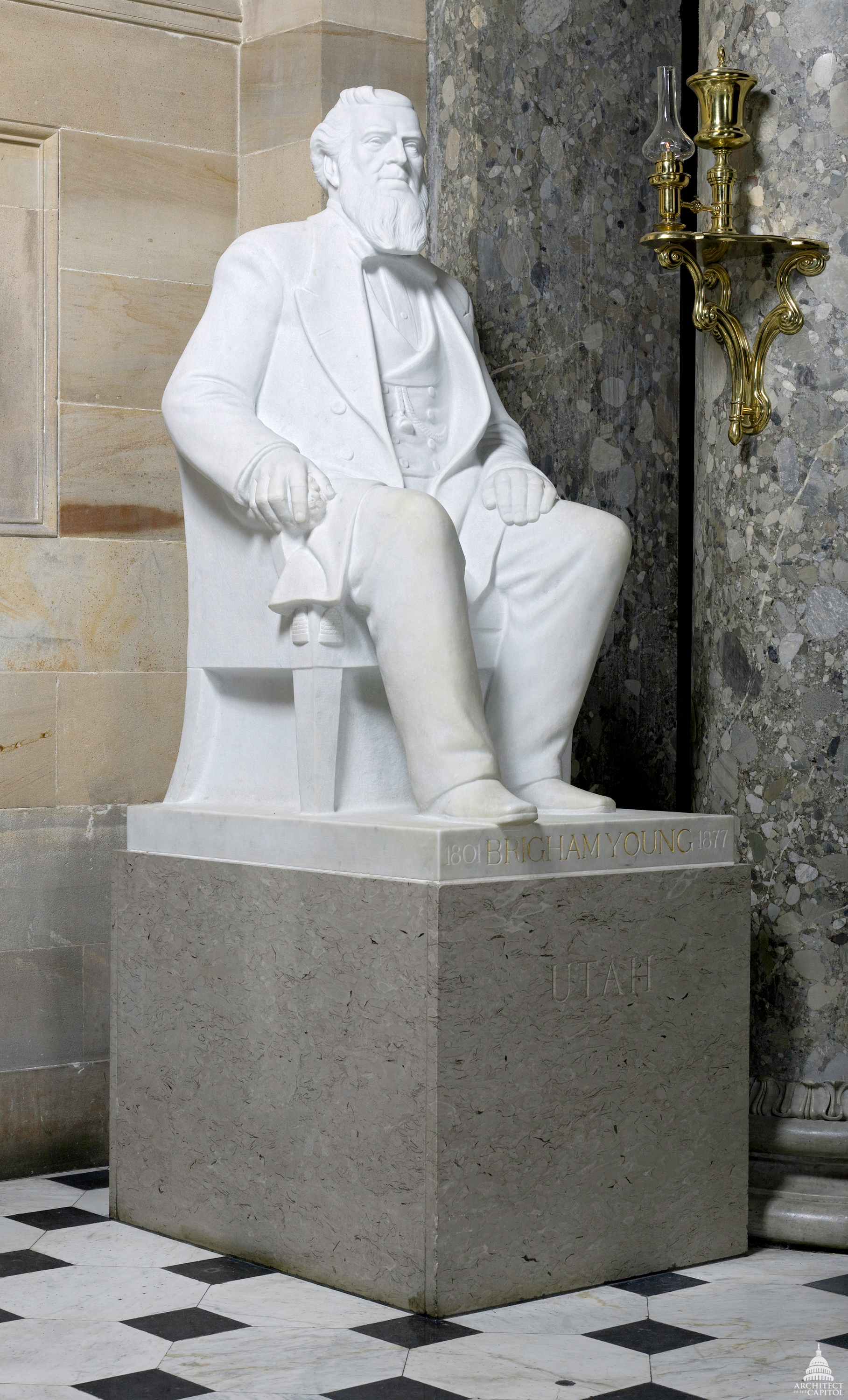
Statue in Statuary Hall of the United States Capitol

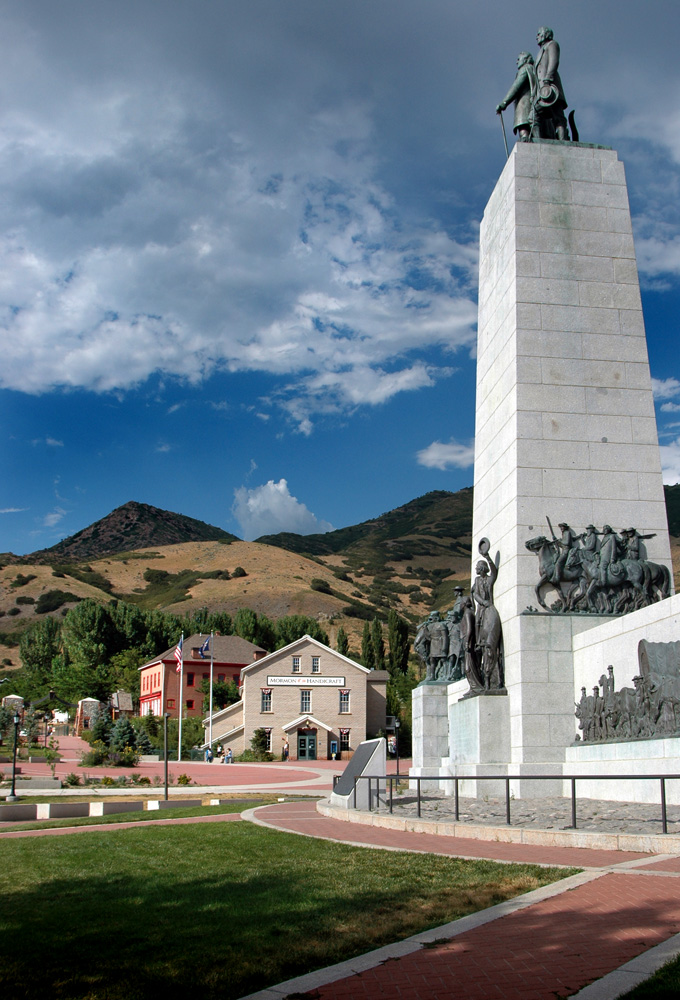
This Is the Place Monument, Salt Lake City

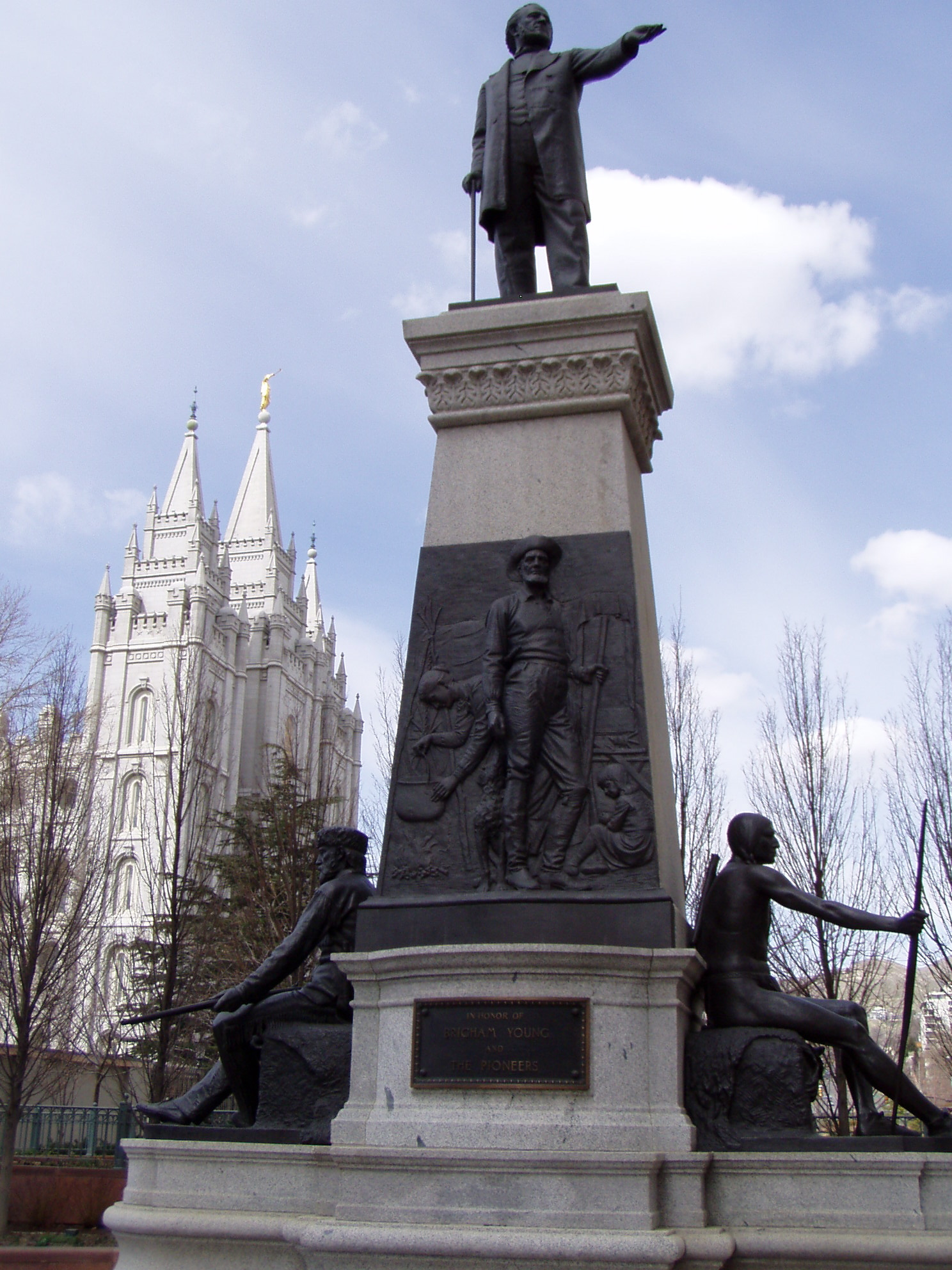
Brigham Young Monument, Salt Lake City

Young had many nicknames during his lifetime, among the most popular being "American Moses" (alternatively, "Modern Moses" or "Mormon Moses"), because, like the biblical figure, Young led his followers, the Mormon pioneers, in an exodus through a desert, to what they saw as a promised land.

Rodman W. Paul credited Young's leadership with helping to settle much of the American West:

During the 30 years between the Mormons' arrival in Utah in 1847 and [his death in] 1877, Young directed the founding of 350 towns in the Southwest. Thereby the Mormons became the most important single agency in colonizing that vast arid West between the Rockies and the Sierra Nevada.

Memorials to Young include a bronze statue in front of the Abraham O. Smoot Administration Building, Brigham Young University; a marble statue in the National Statuary Hall Collection at the United States Capitol, donated by the State of Utah in 1950; and a statue atop the This is the Place Monument in Salt Lake City.

=== Views of race and slavery ===
Young believed in the racial superiority of white men. His manuscript history from January 5, 1852, which was published in the Deseret News, reads:

The negro … should serve the seed of Abraham; he should not be a ruler, nor vote for men to rule over me nor my brethren. The Constitution of Deseret is silent upon this, we meant it should be so. The seed of Canaan cannot hold any office, civil or ecclesiastical. … The decree of God that Canaan should be a servant of servants unto his brethren (i.e., Shem and Japhet [sic]) is in full force. The day will come when the seed of Canaan will be redeemed and have all the blessings their brethren enjoy. Any person that mingles his seed with the seed of Canaan forfeits the right to rule and all the blessings of the Priesthood of God; and unless his blood were spilled and that of his offspring he nor they could not be saved until the posterity of Canaan are redeemed.

Young adopted the idea of the Curse of Ham—a racist interpretation of Genesis 9 which white proponents of slavery in antebellum America used to justify enslaving black people of African descent—and applied it liberally and literally. On this topic, Young wrote: "They have not wisdom to act like white men."

Young also predicted a future in which Chinese and Japanese people would immigrate to America. He averred that Chinese and Japanese immigrants would need to be governed by white men as they would have no understanding of government.

Young had a somewhat mixed view of slavery which historian John G. Turner called a "bundle of contradictions". In the 1840s, Young strove to keep aloof from nationwide political debates over slavery, avoiding committing to either antislavery or proslavery positions. In the early 1850s, he expressed some support for the antislavery "free soil" position in American politics, and in January 1852, he declared in a speech that "no property can or should be recognized as existing in slaves", suggesting opposition to the existence of slavery. However, two weeks later Young declared himself a "firm believer in slavery".

=== Family and descendants ===
Young was a polygamist, having at least fifty-six wives. The policy and practice of polygamy was difficult for many in the church to accept. Young stated that upon being taught about plural marriage by Joseph Smith: "It was the first time in my life that I desired the grave." By the time of his death, Young had fifty-seven children by sixteen of his wives; forty-six of his children reached adulthood.

Sources have varied on the number of Young's wives, as well as their ages. This is due to differences in what scholars have considered to be a "wife". There were fifty-six women who Young was sealed to during his lifetime. While the majority of the sealings were "for eternity", some were "for time only", meaning that Young was sealed to these women as a proxy for their previous husbands who had died. Researchers state that not all of the fifty-six marriages were conjugal. Young did not live with a number of his wives or publicly hold them out as wives, which has led to confusion on the number and their identities. Thirty-one of his wives were not connubial and had exchanged eternity-only vows with him.

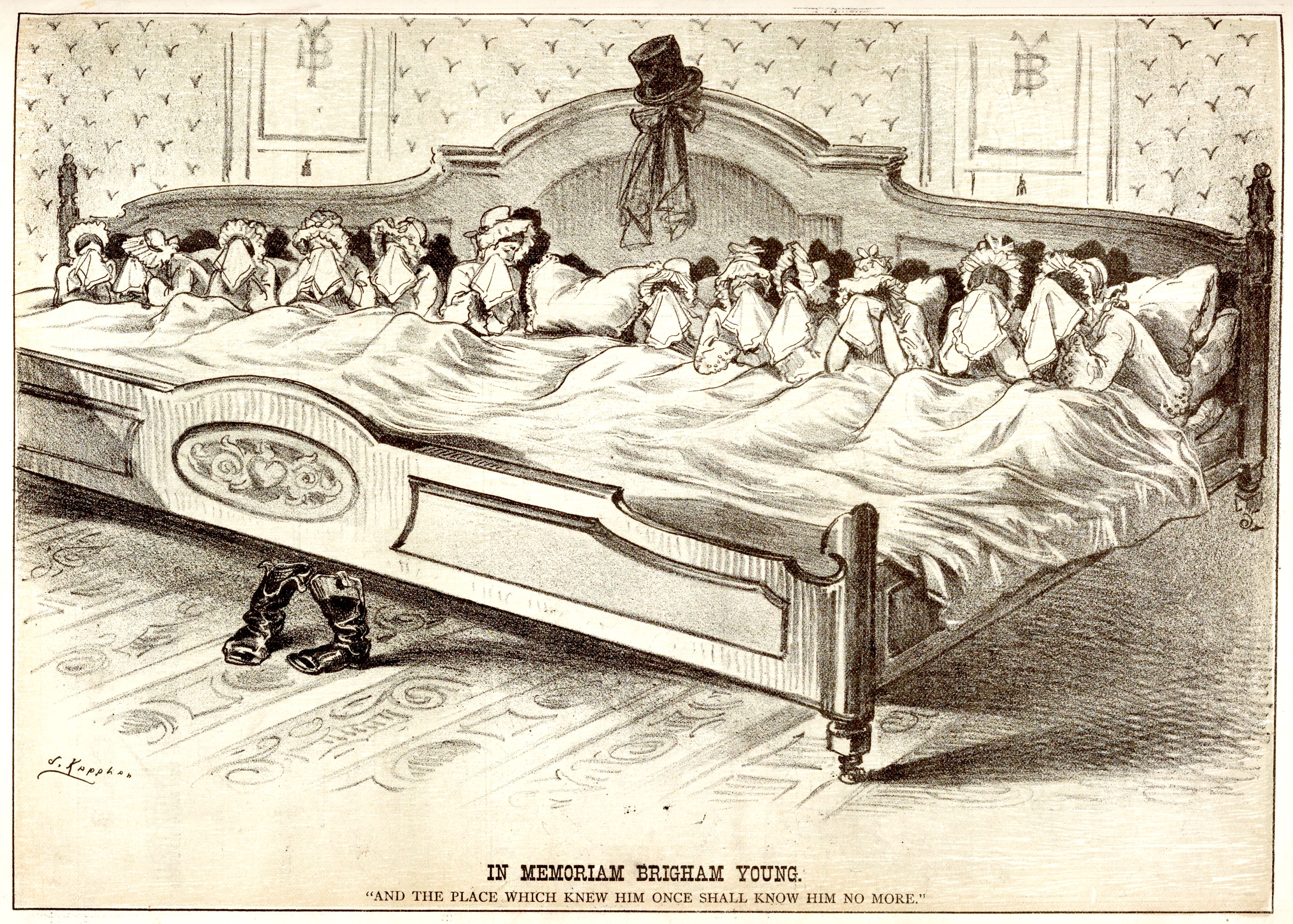
Caricature of Young's wives, published after his death

Of Young's fifty-six wives, twenty-one had never been married before; seventeen were widows; six were divorced; six had living husbands; and the marital status of six others is unknown. Young built the Lion House, the Beehive House, the Gardo House, and the White House in downtown Salt Lake City to accommodate his sizable family. The Beehive House and the Lion House remain as prominent Salt Lake City landmarks. At the north end of the Beehive House was a family store, at which Young's wives and children had running accounts and could buy what they needed. In 1865, Karl Maeser began to privately tutor Young's fifty-six children and stopped when he was called on a mission to Germany in 1867.

At the time of Young's death, nineteen of his wives had predeceased him; he was divorced from ten, and twenty-three survived him. The status of four was unknown. A few of his wives served in administrative positions in the church, such as Zina Huntington and Eliza R. Snow. In his will, Young shared his estate with the sixteen surviving wives who had lived with him; the six surviving non-conjugal wives were not mentioned in the will.

==== Notable descendants ====
In 1902, 25 years after his death, The New York Times established that Young's direct descendants numbered more than 1,000. Some of Young's descendants have become leaders in the LDS Church, as well as prominent political and cultural figures.

== In culture ==
=== In comics ===
Florence Claxton's The Adventures of a Woman in Search of Her Rights (1872), satirizes a would-be emancipated woman whose failure to establish an independent career results in her marriage to Young before she wakes to discover she's been dreaming.

Brigham Young appears at the end of the bande dessinée Le Fil qui chante, the last in the Lucky Luke series by René Goscinny.

=== In literature ===
The Scottish poet John Lyon, who was an intimate friend of Young, wrote Brigham the Bold in tribute to him after his death.

Arthur Conan Doyle gave Brigham Young a minor but pivotal in-person role in the Sherlock Holmes short novel A Study in Scarlet. Young appears here in a scene set in 1860, some time before the novel's publication in 1887. Doyle had based this work, the first Holmes story, in part on Mormon history and portrays the Mormons and Young unsympathetically. When asked to comment, Doyle responded that he "provoked the animosity of the Mormon faithful" and that "all I said about the Danite Band and the murders is historical so I cannot withdraw that though it is likely that in a work of fiction it is stated more luridly than in a work of history." Doyle's daughter stated that, "You know father would be the first to admit that his first Sherlock Holmes novel was full of errors about the Mormons."

Mark Twain devoted a chapter and much of two appendices to Young in Roughing It. In the appendix, Twain describes Young as a theocratic "absolute monarch" defying the will of the U.S. government, and alleges using a dubious source that Young had ordered the Mountain Meadows massacre.

Oliver Wendell Holmes Sr., talking about his fondness for trees, joked in his The Autocrat of the Breakfast-Table: "I call all trees mine that I have put my wedding-ring on, and I have as many tree-wives as Brigham Young has human ones."

In Fitz-James O'Brien's 1857 short story, "My Wife's Tempter", Brigham Young is depicted as an "apostle of hell", whose villainous disciple compels the hero's wife to annul her marriage and marry a Mormon.

=== In film and television ===
Young's character has appeared in a number of films. Dean Jagger played him in the eponymous 1940 film Brigham Young. In The Avenging Angel (1995), he is played by Charlton Heston. Terence Stamp plays him in the 2007 film September Dawn. In Hell on Wheels (2011–2016), he is portrayed by Gregg Henry. He is played by Scott Michael Campbell in the FX on Hulu miniseries Under the Banner of Heaven (2022). He is played by Kim Coates in the Netflix miniseries American Primeval (2025).

=== In theater ===
In the 2011 satirical musical The Book of Mormon, Young is portrayed as a tyrannical American regional warlord, cursed by God to have a clitoris for a nose—a parable cautioning against female genital mutilation.

== Literary works ==
Since Young's death, a number of works have published collections of his discourses and sayings.

- Teachings of President Brigham Young: Salvation for the Dead, the Spirit World, and Kindred Subjects. Seagull Press. 1922.
- Brigham Young (1925). Discourses of Brigham Young. selected by John A. Widtsoe. Deseret Book.
- Young, Brigham (1952). The Best from Brigham Young: Statements from His Sermons on Religion, Education, and Community Building. selected by Alice K. Chase. Deseret Book.
- Manuscript History of Brigham Young, 1801–1844. Eldon J. Watson. 1969.
- Manuscript History of Brigham Young, 1846–1847. Eldon J. Watson. 1971.
- Dean C. Jessee, ed. (1974). Letters of Brigham Young to His Sons. Deseret Book.
- Everett L. Cooley, ed. (1980). Diary of Brigham Young, 1857. University of Utah.
- The Essential Brigham Young. Signature Books. 1992. ISBN 1-56085-010-8. Archived from the original on October 30, 2014.
- Teachings of Presidents of the Church: Brigham Young. The Church of Jesus Christ of Latter-day Saints. 1997. LDS Church publication number 35554
- Young, Brigham (2009). Richard Van Wagoner (ed.). The Complete Discourses of Brigham Young. Vol. 5. Smith-Pettit Foundation. ISBN 978-1-56085-206-3.

== See also ==
- Brigham Young (1940 film)
- Brigham Young Forest Farmhouse
- Brigham Young Winter Home and Office
- This Is The Place Heritage Park
- Ann Eliza Young
- List of people pardoned or granted clemency by the president of the United States

== Sources ==
- Alexander, Thomas G (2019). Brigham Young and the Expansion of the Mormon Faith. The Oklahoma Western Biographies. Norman, Oklahoma: University of Oklahoma Press. ISBN 978-0-8061-6446-5. OCLC 1098034245.
- Arrington, Leonard J. (1985). Brigham Young: American Moses. New York: Alfred A. Knopf. ISBN 0-394-51022-4.
- Bergera, Gary James. Conflict in the Quorum: Orson Pratt, Brigham Young, Joseph Smith. Signature Books. Archived from the original on February 5, 2004 – via Internet Archive.
- Bringhurst, Newell G. (1981). Saints, Slaves, and Blacks: The Changing Place of Black People Within Mormonism. Westport, Connecticut: Greenwood Press. ISBN 0-313-22752-7.
- Cannon, Frank J.; Knapp, George L. (1913). Brigham Young and His Mormon Empire. New York: Fleming H. Revell Co.
- Coleman, Jon T. (2004). Vicious: Wolves and Men in America. Western Americana. Yale University Press. ISBN 978-0-300-11972-5.
- Gibbons, Francis M. (1981). Brigham Young, modern Moses, prophet of God. Salt Lake City, Utah: Deseret Book. ISBN 0-87747-858-9. OCLC 7554845.
- Goldenberg, David M. (2003). The Curse of Ham: Race and Slavery in Early Judaism, Christianity, and Islam. Princeton: Princeton University Press. ISBN 069111465X – via Internet Archive.
- Gutjahr, Paul C. (2012). The Book of Mormon: A Biography. Lives of Great Religious Books. Princeton: Princeton University Press. ISBN 978-0691144801 – via Internet Archive.
- Harris, Matthew L.; Bringhurst, Newell G. (2015). The Mormon Church and Blacks: A Documentary History. Urbana: University of Illinois Press. ISBN 978-0252097843.
- Mason, David V. (2014). Brigham Young: Sovereign in America. New York: Routledge. ISBN 978-0415844840.
- McCloud, Susan Evans (1996). Brigham Young : a personal portrait. American Fork, UT: Covenant Communications. ISBN 1-55503-986-3. OCLC 35317457.
- Nibley, Hugh W. (1994). Brother Brigham Challenges the Saints (The Collected Works of Hugh Nibley, vol. 13). Salt Lake City, Utah: Shadow Mountain Pub. ISBN 0-87579-818-7., republished online at Brother Brigham Challenges the Saints by Hugh W. Nibley. FARMS. Archived from the original on December 20, 2013..
- Orton, Chad M. (2008). 40 ways to look at Brigham Young : a new approach to a remarkable man. William W. Slaughter. Salt Lake City, Utah: Deseret Book. ISBN 978-1-59038-786-3. OCLC 215172986.
- Quinn, D. Michael (1994). The Mormon Hierarchy: Origins of Power. Vol. 1. Salt Lake City: Signature Books. ISBN 978-1560850564.
- Shipps, Jan (1985). Mormonism: The Story of a New Religious Tradition. Urbana: University of Illinois Press. ISBN 0252011597 – via Internet Archive.
- Smith, George D. (2008). Nauvoo Polygamy: "…But We Called It Celestial Marriage". Salt Lake City: Signature Books. ISBN 978-1560852018.
- Tullidge, Edward W. (1877). Life of Brigham Young: Or, Utah and Her Founders. New York: Tullidge & Crandall.
- Turner, John G. (2012). Brigham Young: Pioneer Prophet. Cambridge, Massachusetts: Harvard University Press. ISBN 978-0674049673. OCLC 894538617 – via Internet Archive.
- Waite, C.V. (Catherine Van Valkenburg) (1868). The Mormon prophet and his harem: or, An authentic history of Brigham Young, his numerous wives and children. Chicago: J.S. Goodman & Co.. See also: The Mormon Prophet and His Harem.
- Young, Brigham (April 9, 1852). "Self-Government – Mysteries – Recreation and Amusements, not in Themselves Sinful – Tithing – Adam, Our Father and Our God". In Watt, G.D. (ed.). Journal of Discourses by Brigham Young, President of the Church of Jesus Christ of Latter-Day Saints, His Two Counsellors, the Twelve Apostles, and Others. Vol. 1. Liverpool: F.D. & S.W. Richards. pp. 46–53.
- Young, Brigham (March 2, 1856). "The Necessity of the Saints Living up to the Light Which Has Been Given Them". In Watt, G.D. (ed.). Journal of Discourses Delivered by President Brigham Young, His Two Counsellors, and the Twelve Apostles, and Others. Vol. 3. Liverpool: Daniel H. Wells. pp. 221–226.

Political offices
Preceded by None	Governor of Utah Territory; 1850–1858	Succeeded by Alfred Cumming
The Church of Jesus Christ of Latter-day Saints titles
Preceded by Joseph Smith	President of the Church; December 27, 1847 – August 29, 1877	Succeeded by John Taylor
Preceded by Thomas B. Marsh	President of the Quorum of the Twelve Apostles; March 17, 1839 – December 27, 1847	Succeeded by Orson Hyde
Preceded by David W. Patten	Quorum of the Twelve Apostles; February 14, 1835 – December 27, 1847	Succeeded by Heber C. Kimball
