= This Is the Place Monument =

Monument in Salt Lake City, Utah, US

Coordinates: 40.753167°N 111.813317°W

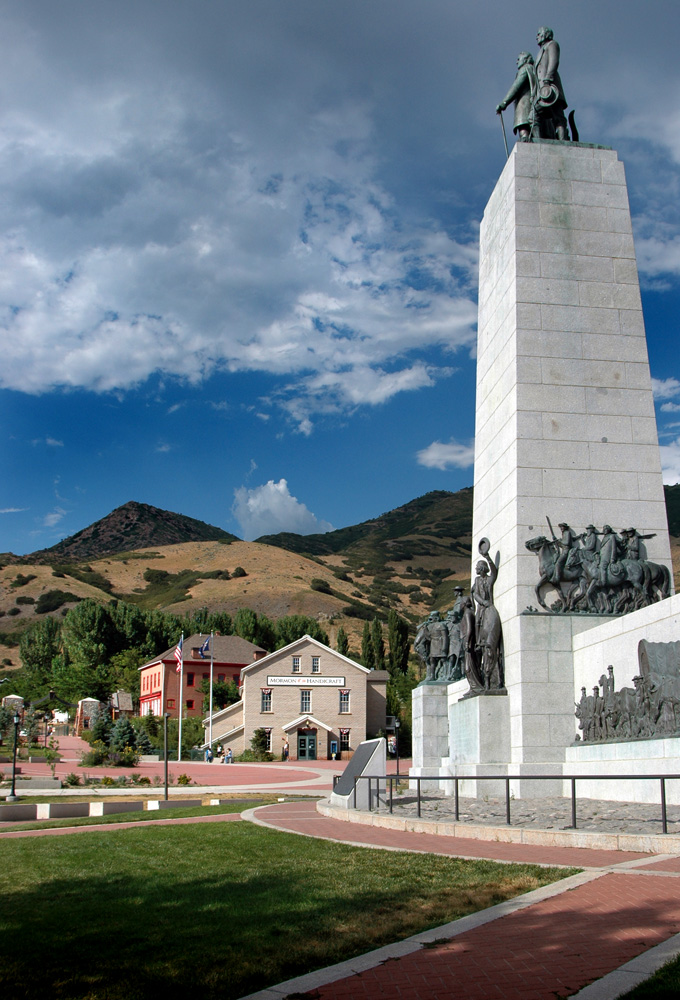
The This Is The Place Monument in Salt Lake City, Utah

The This is the Place Monument is a historical monument at the This Is the Place Heritage Park, located on the east side of Salt Lake City, Utah, at the mouth of Emigration Canyon. It is named in honor of Brigham Young's famous statement that the Mormon pioneers should settle in the Salt Lake Valley. On July 24, 1847, upon first viewing the valley, Young stated: "This is the right place, drive on." Mahonri M. Young, a grandson of Brigham Young, sculpted the monument between 1939 and 1947 at Weir Farm in Connecticut. Young was awarded $50,000 to build the monument in 1939, and he was aided by Spero Anargyros as the chief assistant. It stands as a monument to the Mormon pioneers as well as the explorers and settlers of the American West. It was dedicated by George Albert Smith, president of the Church of Jesus Christ of Latter-day Saints, on July 24, 1947, the hundredth anniversary of the pioneers entering the Salt Lake Valley. It replaced a much smaller monument located nearby.

In the mid-1970s, a living history museum, called This Is the Place Heritage Park was built at a site adjoining the monument. It began with the restoration or replication of historical pioneer-era buildings from around Utah. It has greatly expanded since then and has become a popular venue for receptions, corporate parties, family reunions and youth events.

== Groups on the monument ==
- Brigham Young, Heber C. Kimball, and Wilford Woodruff on the top of the monument
- Mormon pioneers from the vanguard expedition of 1847 including the nine preliminary explorers, the main company, and the rear group.
- Donner Party
- Spanish explorers from the Domínguez–Escalante expedition in 1776
- William H. Ashley and American Fur Company trappers

== Individuals on the monument ==
- Benjamin Bonneville
- John Brown
- Isaac Perry Decker
- John C. Fremont
- Hugh Glass
- Heber C. Kimball
- Ellen Sanders Kimball
- Jesse C. Little
- Joseph Matthews
- Peter Skene Ogden
- John Pack
- Orson Pratt
- Etienne Provost
- Willard Richards
- Orrin Porter Rockwell
- Father de Smet
- George A. Smith
- Erastus Snow
- Chief Washakie
- Wilford Woodruff
- Brigham Young
- Clarissa Decker Young
- Harriet Page Wheeler Decker Young
- Lorenzo Dow Young
- Lorenzo Sobieski Young

== See also ==
- Mormon handcart pioneers
- Mormon Trail
- Pioneer Day (Utah)
- Utah…This Is The Place
