= Cooper station (Connecticut) =

US railroad station, c. 1885–1925

Cooper
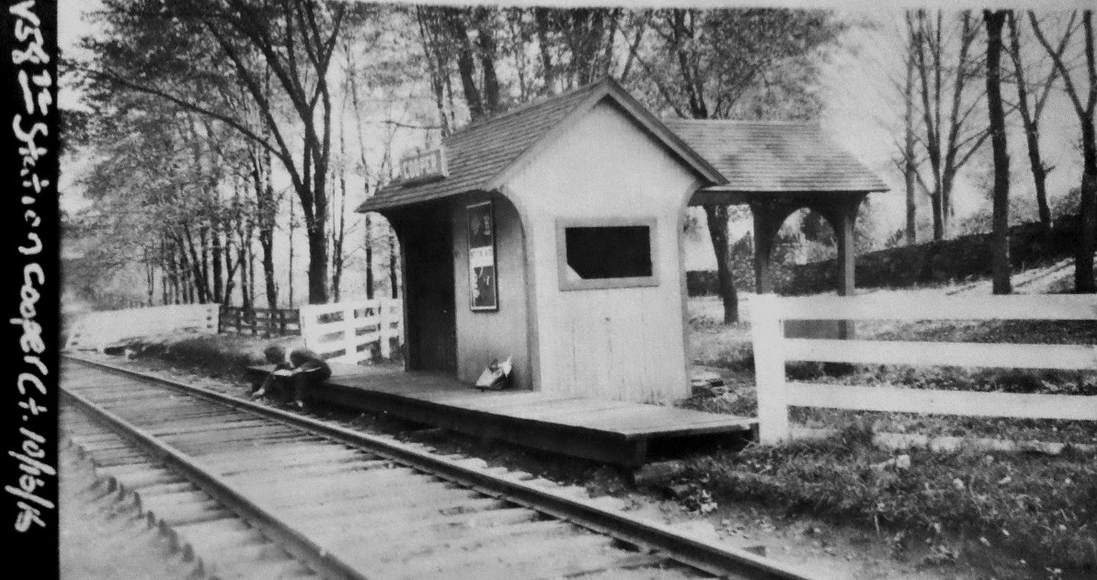
- Cooper station in 1916.

General information
- Coordinates: 41.2743°N 73.4654°W
- Line: Ridgefield Branch
- Platforms: 1 side platform
- Tracks: 1

History
- Opened: c. 1885
- Closed: 1925
Location

Cooper station was a stop on the Ridgefield Branch of the Danbury and Norwalk Railroad and later the New York, New Haven, and Hartford Railroad. Opened c. 1885 as a flag stop in the town of Ridgefield, Connecticut, the station was closed in 1925 when passenger service on the Ridgefield branch was discontinued. The station existed alongside the Florida and Ridgefield stations along the branch. Cooper was named so due to the namesake street it was located on which was in turn named for an unidentified cooper who operated a workshop in the vicinity.

== History ==
The station first appears on an 1885 timetable where it opened as a flag stop for all trains. From the time of the station's opening until 1888 when the postmaster was caught embezzling stamp sales, a post office was housed in the station. Writer and author Mark Twain, who at that time lived in the neighboring town of Redding, frequently took the train from Branchville to the station in order to meet with his friend Colonel Edward M. Knox, who also played a pivotal role in the creation of the station. Passenger service to the station continued until passenger operations were discontinued on the Ridgefield Branch on August 8, 1925. Although freight service would continue until 1964 on the Ridgefield Branch, the station was abandoned the same year passenger service ended.

== Station layout ==
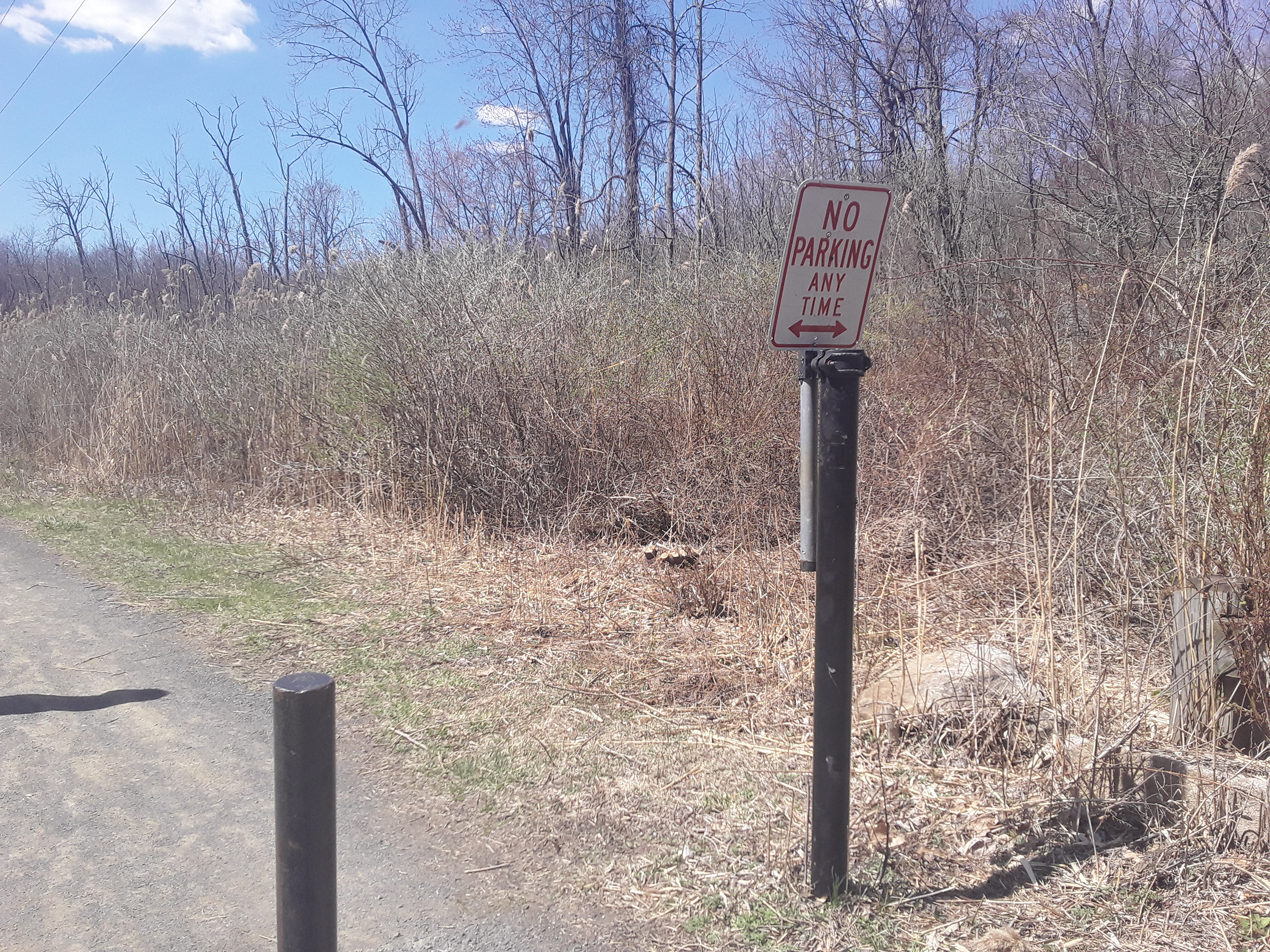
The site of Cooper station, located along the Ridgefield Rail Trail, seen in April 2021.

Cooper station consisted of one low level side platform which was served by the Ridgefield Branch's single track. Nothing remains of the station structure but the corresponding track is now the Ridgefield Rail Trail. Throughout its time as a station, Cooper was also known by the names Milk station and Zalicoffers.
