= Benedict House =

Benedict House may refer to:

in the United States (by state then city)

- Dunning–Benedict House, Denver, Colorado, listed on the NRHP in downtown Denver
- Francis Benedict Jr. House, Norfolk, Connecticut, listed on the NRHP in Litchfield County
- Benedict House and Shop, Ridgefield, Connecticut, listed on the NRHP in Fairfield County
- Benedict–Miller House, Waterbury, Connecticut, listed on the NRHP in New Haven County
- Benedict House (Lawrence, Kansas), listed on the NRHP in Douglas County
- Benedict House (Portsmouth, New Hampshire), listed on the NRHP in Rockingham County
- Sarah Benedict House, Cleveland, Ohio, listed on the NRHP in Cleveland
- Dr. David De Forest Benedict House, Norwalk, Ohio, listed on the NRHP in Huron County
- Reuben Benedict House, Marengo, Ohio, listed on the NRHP in Morrow County
- Edwin E. Benedict House, Florence, Oregon, listed on the NRHP in Lane County
