= Ethel Ryan =

American politician (1886–1971)

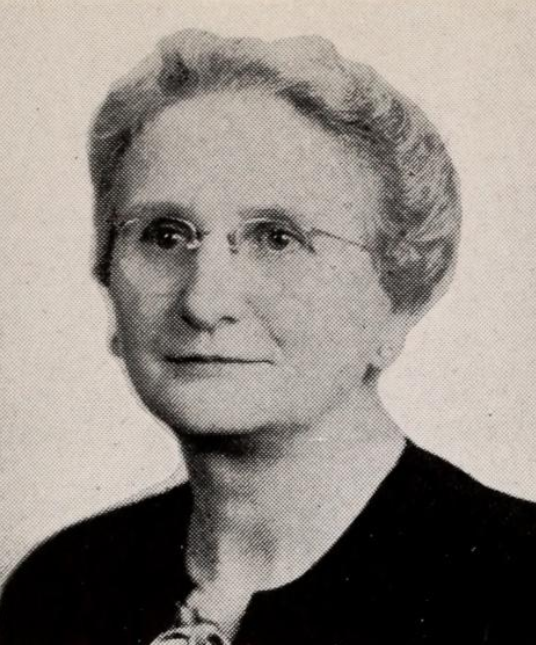

Member of the Connecticut House of Representatives from Ridgefield
- In office 1925–1929
- Preceded by: Thomas W. Ryan; Seth Low Pierrepont
- Succeeded by: Mortimer C. Keeler; Hugh Shields
- In office 1943–1947
- Preceded by: William R. Keeler; Peter A. McManus
- Succeeded by: Harold E. Finch; Peter A. McManus

Personal details
- Born: February 14, 1886 New York City, New York, U.S.
- Died: February 24, 1971 (aged 85) Sarasota, Florida, U.S.
- Party: Republican
- Spouse(s): William Henry Ryan (died 1954)
- Children: 2
- Education: Danbury Normal School

Ethel Ryan (February 14, 1886 – February 25, 1971) was an American politician who served in the Connecticut House of Representatives from 1925 to 1929 and 1943 to 1947, representing the town of Ridgefield as a Republican.

== Personal life ==
Ryan was born in New York City on February 14, 1886, to parents Michael and Bridget McGlynn. She graduated from Western Connecticut State University, then known as the Danbury State Normal School, and worked as a schoolteacher in Connecticut. She was married to William Henry Ryan until his death in 1954, and she had two daughters. Ryan moved from Connecticut to Sarasota, Florida, around 1960.

== Political career ==
A Republican, Ryan was first elected to the Connecticut House of Representatives in 1924 as one of two representatives from the town of Ridgefield. She served two terms, the first alongside Seth Low Pierrepont and the second alongside Mortimer C. Keeler. During her first term, Ryan served on the public health and safety and capital furniture and grounds committees; during her second term, she served on the public health and state parks committees. Ryan was not a candidate for reelection in 1928.

Ryan was again elected to the House of Representatives in 1942, and she served two terms representing Ridgefield alongside Peter A. McManus. She was not a candidate for reelection in 1946 and left office in 1947.

Ryan served two terms on Ridgefield's board of education.

== Death ==
Ryan died on February 24, 1971, in Sarasota, Florida. She was 85.
