= Seth Low Pierrepont =

American politician and diplomat (1884–1956)

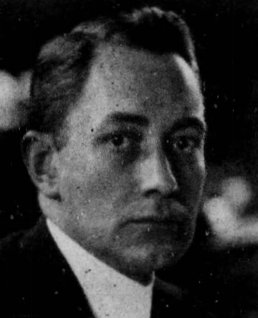

Member of the Connecticut House of Representatives from Ridgefield
- In office 1921–1927
- Preceded by: Jesse L. Benedict; William C. Barhite
- Succeeded by: Ethel Ryan; Mortimer C. Keeler

Personal details
- Born: December 25, 1884 Brooklyn, New York, U.S.
- Died: 1956
- Party: Republican

Seth Low Pierrepont (December 25, 1884 – 1956) was an American diplomat and politician.

== Early life ==
Pierrepont was born in Brooklyn, New York, on December 25, 1884. He was a son of merchant Henry Evelyn Pierrepont, and Ellen (née Low) Pierrepont. One of six children, his elder brother was R. Stuyvesant Pierrepont. He was the nephew of Seth Low, mayor of New York City and President of Columbia University, and a nephew of John Jay Pierrepont. In 1907 he graduated from Columbia University with a bachelor's degree.

== Career ==
Pierrepont was in the diplomatic service in Portugal, Italy, France, and Chile, eventually becoming chief of the Latin-American Division of the U.S. State Department from 1911 until 1913. During World War 1, he was on domestic duty in the United States Navy.

=== Political career ===
Pierrepont moved to Ridgefield, Connecticut in 1913. While there, he became active in local politics and was a member of the Connecticut House of Representatives from 1921 to 1927, serving as a member of the Republican Party. He served on the Ridgefield Board of Finance from 1921 to 1951. He was president of the Fairfield County Farm Bureau, was on the board of directors of Berea College from 1916 until his death, was a president of the Ridgefield Library, headed Ridgefield's celebration of the Connecticut Tercentenary in 1936, was chairman of the Connecticut Salvage Committee during World War 2, and was an official of St. Stephen's Church of Ridgefield for 40 years. He was a delegate to the 1933 Connecticut Convention to Ratify the 21st Amendment.

=== Philanthropy ===
In the early 1930s, Pierrepont purchased the land that would later become Seth Low Pierrepont State Park Reserve. He created a new lake that he later named Lake Naraneka from an "impassable" swamp on the property. He stated: "We are calling it Lake Naraneka after one of the Indian chiefs who signed the deed to the town of Ridgefield." He later complained to Connecticut state authorities when he found the name "Pierrepont lake" being used on maps.

In his will, Pierrepont allocated 321 acres of the property to become Seth Low Pierrepont State Park Preserve, as a gift to the Connecticut State Park and Forest Commission. He also expressed his desire for his remaining family to give the remainder of the property to the state, but that never ended up happening as his widow decided to sell it to developers.

== Personal life ==
In 1909, Pierrepont married Nathalie Chauncey. He died in 1956 and is buried in Green-Wood Cemetery in Brooklyn.

=== Seth Low Pierrepont House ===
Seth Low Pierrepont House (near Pierrepont Lake) was designed in 1917 by architect, Roger Bullard. The Ridgefield Historical Society has the architectural drawings of the house on display to "honor the architectural heritage of Ridgefield."
