= Ridgefield Branch =

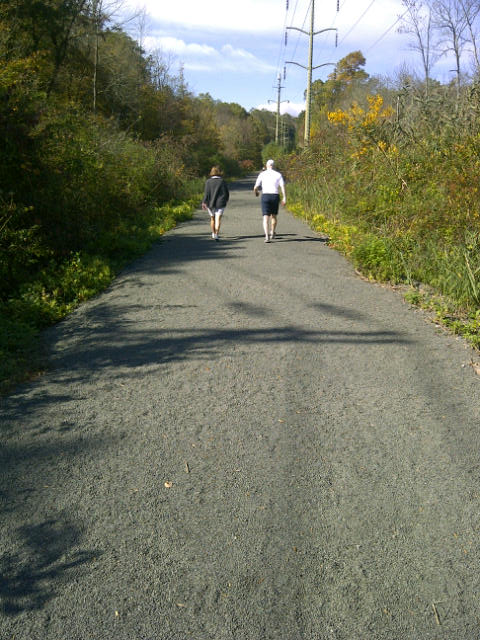
- The former branch in use as the Ridgefield Rail Trail.

Overview
- Operator: Danbury and Norwalk (former), Housatonic (former), New Haven (former)
- Dates of operation: 1870–1964

Technical
- Length: 4.0 miles (6.4 km)

The Ridgefield Branch was a branch line of the Danbury and Norwalk Railroad and later the New York, New Haven and Hartford Railroad. It ran for 4.0 miles (6.4 km) from Branchville to the center of Ridgefield, Connecticut. After a difficult and costly construction hindered by the topography of the Norwalk River valley, the branch opened in July 1870 after a year of construction. Throughout its existence, three stations (Florida, Cooper, and Ridgefield) existed on the line. In 1925, amid electrification of the neighboring Danbury Line, passenger service on the branch was terminated. Freight service continued to just the Ridgefield station until 1964, when the line was abandoned entirely.

In 2000, Connecticut Light and Power constructed the 2.3 miles (3.7 km) Ridgefield Rail Trail from part of the original corridor. In 2016, the original Ridgefield station, which had been in use as a storage shed by the Ridgefield Supply Company, was rebuilt and currently serves as a showroom.

== History ==
=== Construction ===
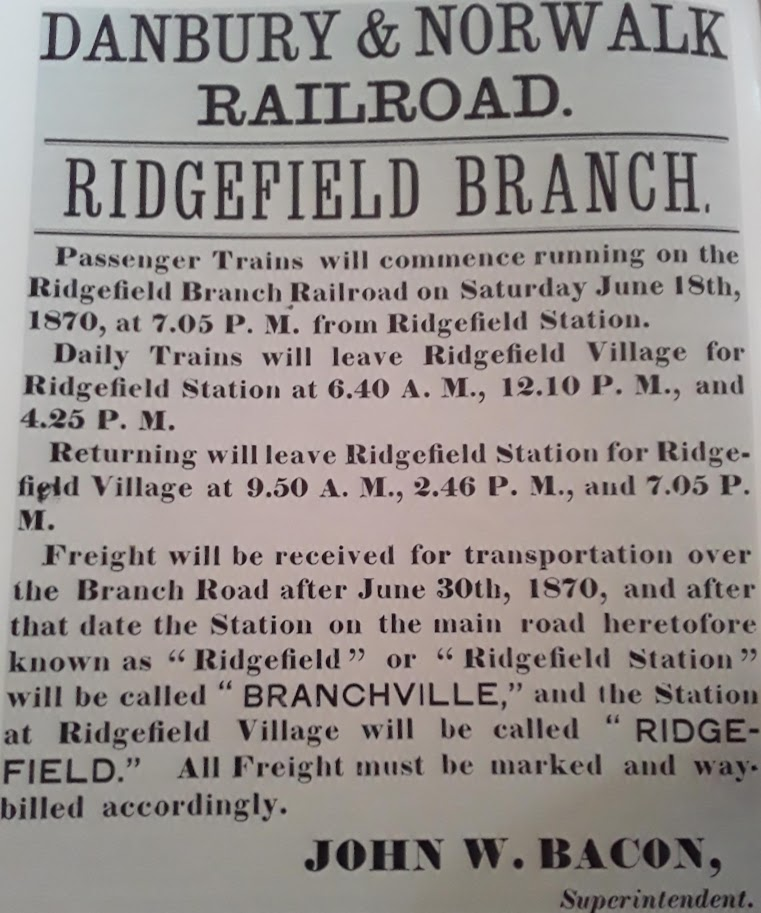
1870 poster announcing the opening of the Ridgefield Branch.

In 1869, then-Danbury and Norwalk Railroad president LeGrand Lockwood devised the Ridgefield Branch in order to prevent "paper railroads" from building through the town of Ridgefield. Although Lockwood's strategy successfully prevented any other line from building through Ridgefield, the branch's construction proved to be one of the most difficult and challenging in the state. Construction began in 1869 and ended just before trains began running on the line on June 25, 1870. Construction on the four-mile line was heavily hindered by steep grades of up to 120 feet per mile (2.27%) rising out of the narrow Norwalk River valley. As a result of the nature of the branch's topography, the line was finished with 18 curves in just four miles. In addition, the branch's construction cost nearly $250,000, just as much as the main Danbury Line had cost back in 1850.

=== 1870-1925 ===
At the time of the branch's completion, the newly built Ridgefield station opened near the branch's terminus. Shortly after opening, the branch was reduced to a routine operation of three daily trains to and from Branchville. By 1885, the new Cooper station opened at the crossing with Cooper Hill Road. At some time prior to 1904, the Florida station, located at the crossing with Florida Road, opened. Amid electrification of the Danbury Branch and other New Haven lines, the New Haven Railroad opted to cut passenger service on the branch entirely. The final scheduled passenger train to run on the branch, hauled by New Haven Engine No. 600, ran on August 8, 1925.

=== After 1925 ===
After passenger service ceased in August 1925, it was briefly replaced by bus service provided by the New England Transportation Company. Replacing branch line passenger service with buses was a common money-saving practice in the years leading up to, and during the Great Depression. Freight service to just the Ridgefield station would last until it was permanently suspended on January 8, 1964, during the financial decline of the New Haven Railroad. The Ridgefield depot was sold on October 31, 1946, to the Ridgefield Supply Company, who later rebuilt the old depot for use as a showroom as part of a major overhaul to their facilities in 2016. In 2000, the Connecticut Light and Power Company constructed the 2.3 miles (3.7 km) Ridgefield Rail Trail that follows a portion of the original branch.

=== Incidents ===
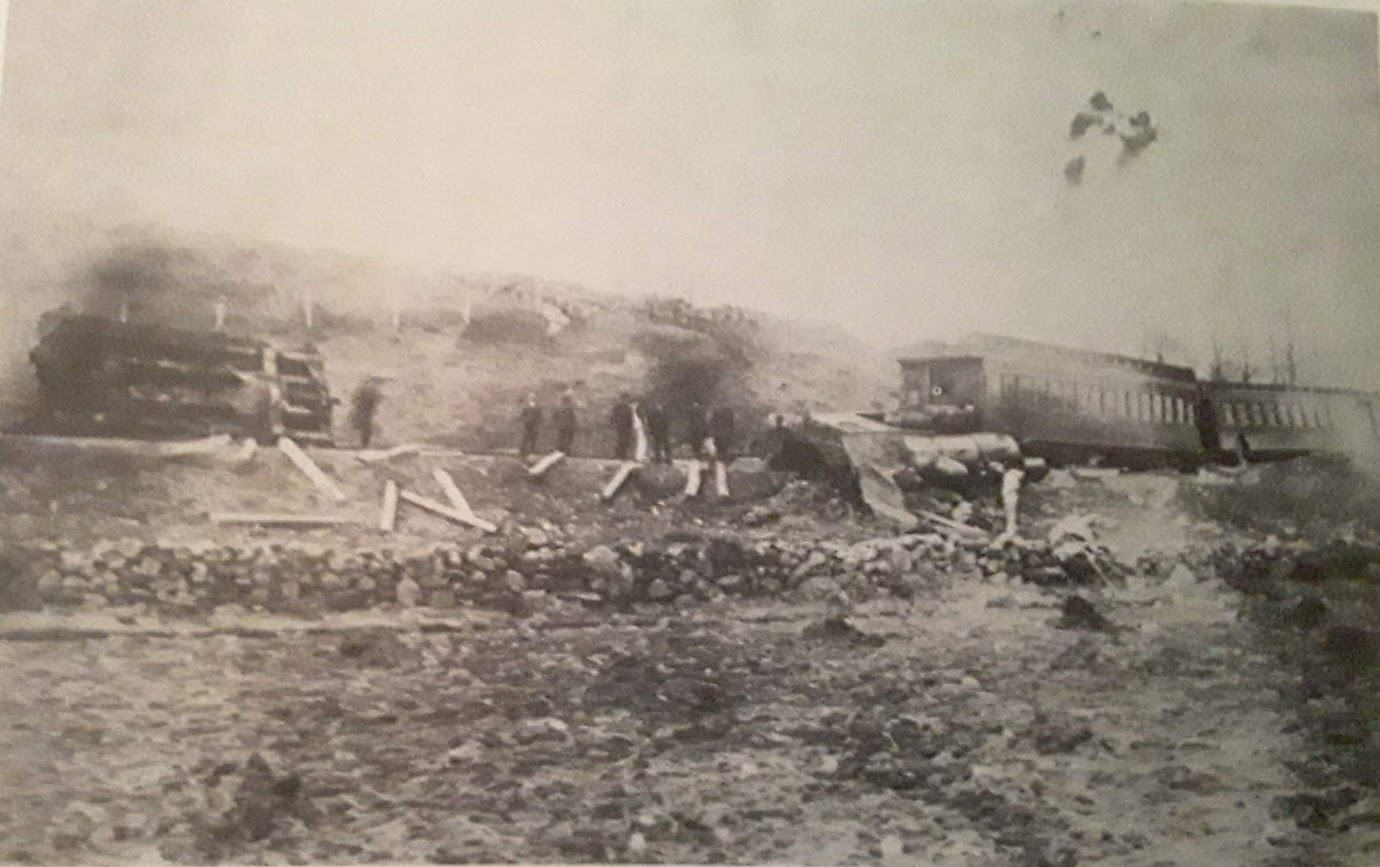
Scene of the 1905 derailment.

On April 17, 1905, a major accident occurred when New Haven engine No. 1640's coal tender suddenly derailed, separating itself from the engine and causing the engine to derail as well. The incident resulted in the death of engineer William Horan, who was pinned underneath the crashed locomotive and scalded by its steam, as well as heavy damage to the track and ties.

== Stations ==
Miles (km)	Station	Years active	Notes
0.0 miles (0 km)	Branchville	1852–present	Main line terminus of the branch.
1.2 miles (1.9 km)	Florida	c.1904-1925	Located at the crossing with Florida Road.
1.93 miles (3.11 km)	Cooper	c.1885-1925	Located at the crossing with Cooper Hill Road.
3.87 miles (6.23 km)	Ridgefield	1870-1964	Passenger service ended in 1925, with freight service lasting until 1964.

== See also ==
- Danbury and Norwalk Railroad
- Ridgefield station (New York, New Haven, and Hartford Railroad)
