= Benedict House and Shop =

Historic house in Connecticut, United States

- U.S. National Register of Historic Places
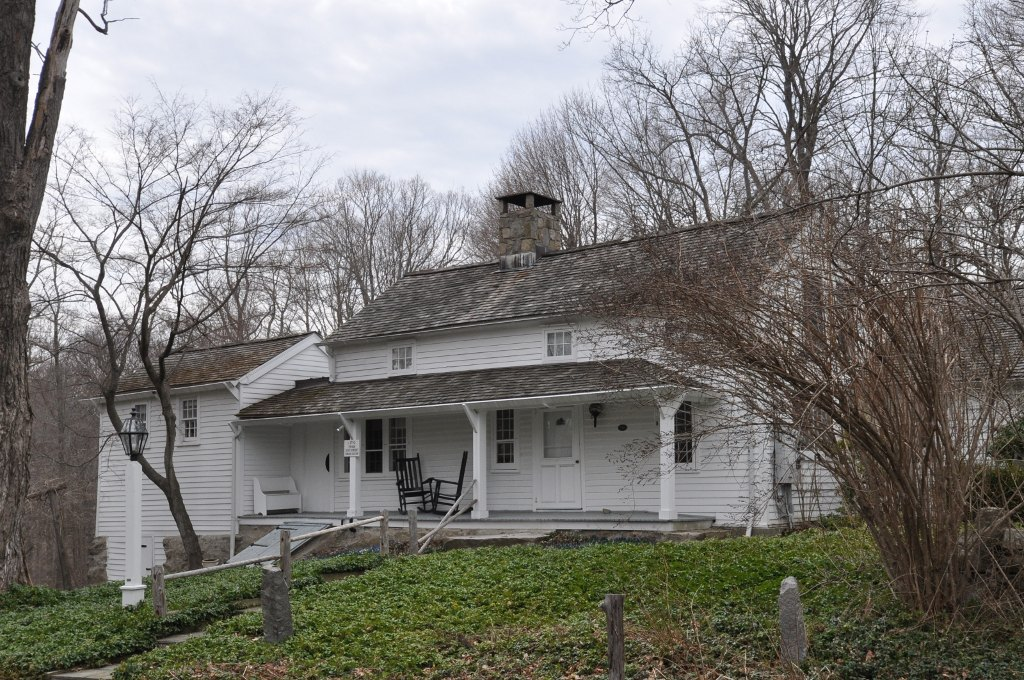

- Location within Connecticut Location within the United States
- Location: 57 Rockwell Road, Ridgefield, Connecticut
- Coordinates: 41°16′19″N 73°29′32″W
- Area: 5.9 acres (2.4 ha)
- Built: 1740
- Architectural style: Colonial
- NRHP reference No.: 98001440
- Added to NRHP: December 4, 1998

The Benedict House and Shop is a historic property at 57 Rockwell Road in Ridgefield, Connecticut. Built in 1740, the connected house and shop are among the oldest surviving buildings in the community. The shop is a particularly rare example of a cobbler's workshop of the 19th century. They are further notable for the sympathetic restoration they underwent at the hands of architect Cass Gilbert. The property was added to the National Register of Historic Places on December 4, 1998.

== Description and history ==
The Benedict House and Shop stand southeast of Ridgefield's town center, on a sloping lot overlooking Rockwell Road to the south. The house is a 1 1/2-story timber-frame structure, with a gabled roof and off-center chimney. The first floor of the facade is sheltered by a hip-roofed porch with square posts, with small (apparently original) fixed six-pane windows between the porch roof and main roof cornice. Attached to the left side of the house is the workshop, a single-story timber structure with gabled roof, which is set on a high foundation due to the steeply sloping terrain. The interior of the house is a modified center chimney plan, owing to the addition of the third bay during Cass Gilbert's restoration.

The house was built in 1740 for a member of the Benedict family, who were among the first colonial settlers of the town.. It is significant as a rare surviving example of a colonial artisan's workshop. Although the early residents of the house (all Benedicts) were apparently engaged in a variety of rural agricultural and business pursuits, several generations in the 19th century were cobblers. The property is one of four in Ridgefield that Cass Gilbert restored (the Keeler Tavern in the town center is another).

== See also ==
- National Register of Historic Places listings in Fairfield County, Connecticut
