= Ridgefield station (New York, New Haven, and Hartford Railroad) =

Ridgefield
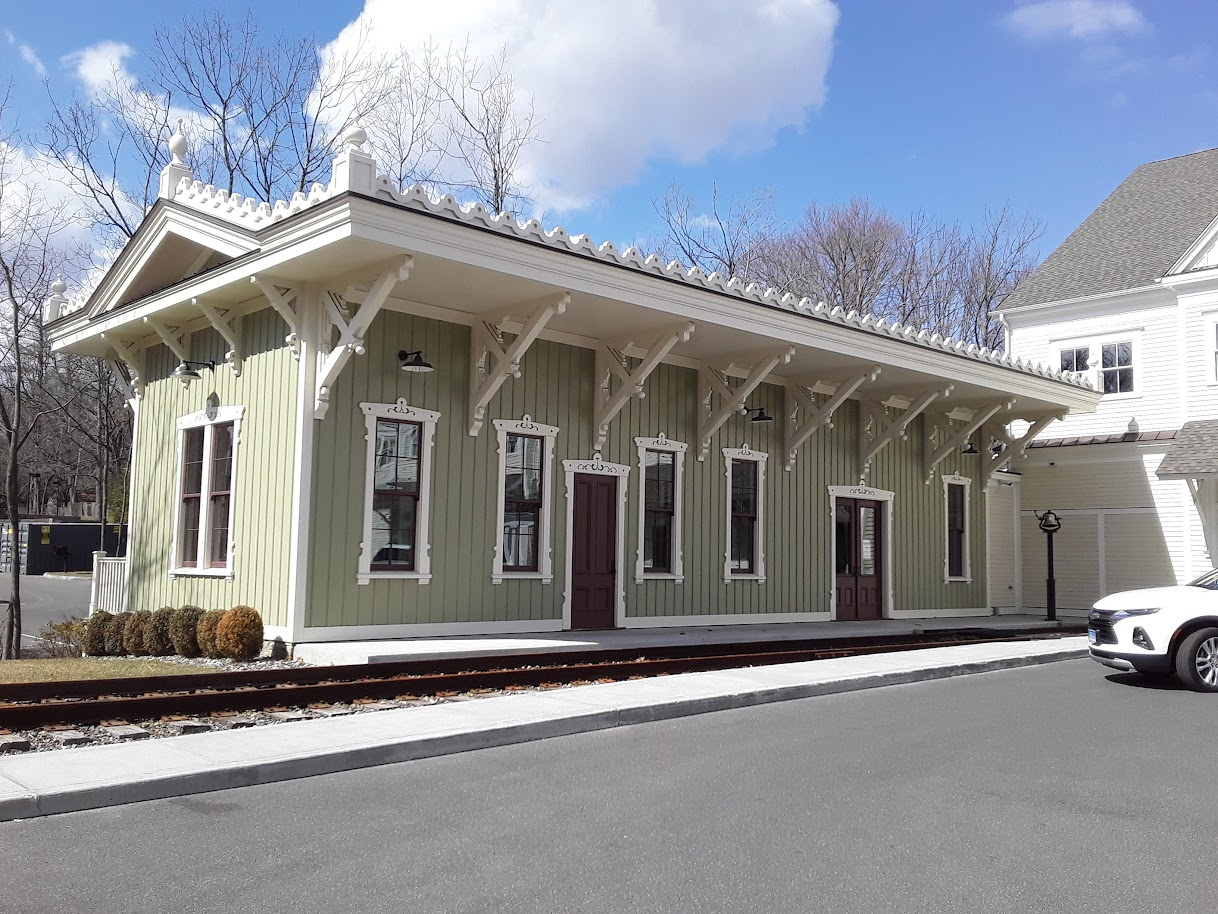
- Rebuilt version as seen in 2021

General information
- Coordinates: 41.28272°N 73.49632°W
- Platforms: 1
- Tracks: 1

History
- Opened: 1870
- Closed: 1964
Location

Ridgefield station was a station on the Ridgefield Branch of the Danbury and Norwalk Railroad and later the New York, New Haven, and Hartford Railroad, located in the town of Ridgefield, Connecticut. Opened in 1870 as the terminus of its namesake branch line. The station would serve passengers until the discontinuation of passenger service on August 8, 1925, afterwards only accommodating freight service until the NYNH&H abandoned the line entirely in 1964. The station would remain as a part of the Ridgefield Supply Company's headquarters until 2015, when the original station was disassembled, refurbished, and moved to the other side of the property where it still stands today.

== History ==
=== Construction ===
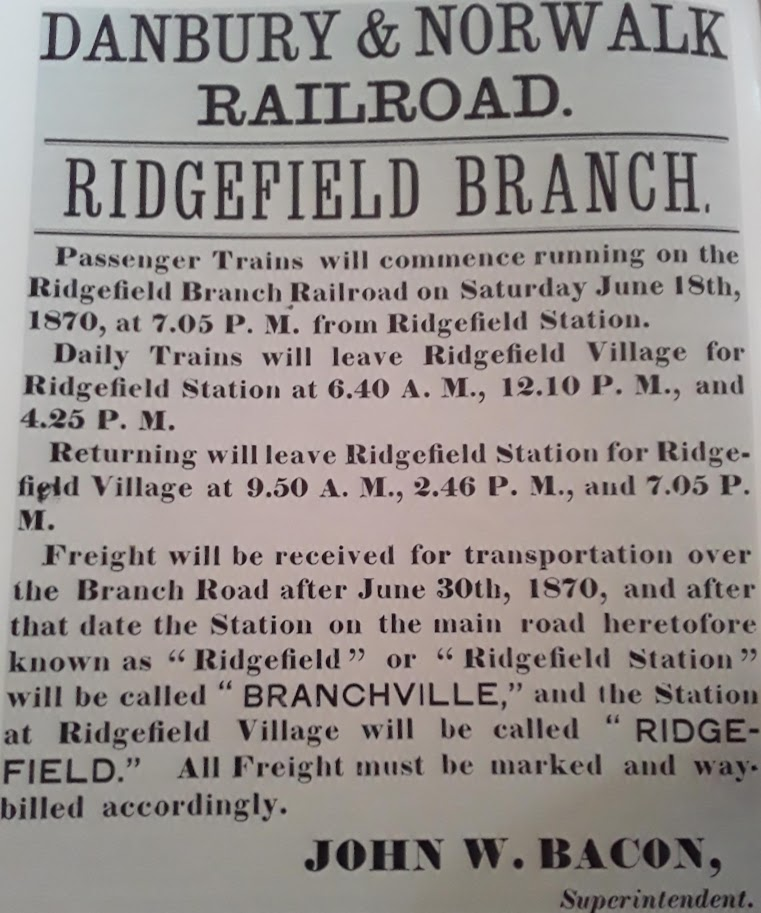
1870 poster announcing the opening of the Ridgefield Branch.

In 1869, LeGrand Lockwood, then the president of the Danbury and Norwalk Railroad, had the Ridgefield Branch constructed in order to stop rival companies from building through the town of Ridgefield. Nevertheless, the branch's construction would prove to be one of the most difficult rail operations in the state. Construction was made difficult by grades nearly 120 feet per mile (2.27%) climbing out of the narrow Norwalk River valley. Additionally, the line's construction costed at least $250,000 ($5,654,790.08 in 2022) and was serving a town which at that time was home to just 1,919 people. On June 25, 1870, the final rail was laid and trains began running on the branch, with coincidentally, construction on the Ridgefield station also being completed on that same day.

=== Service ===
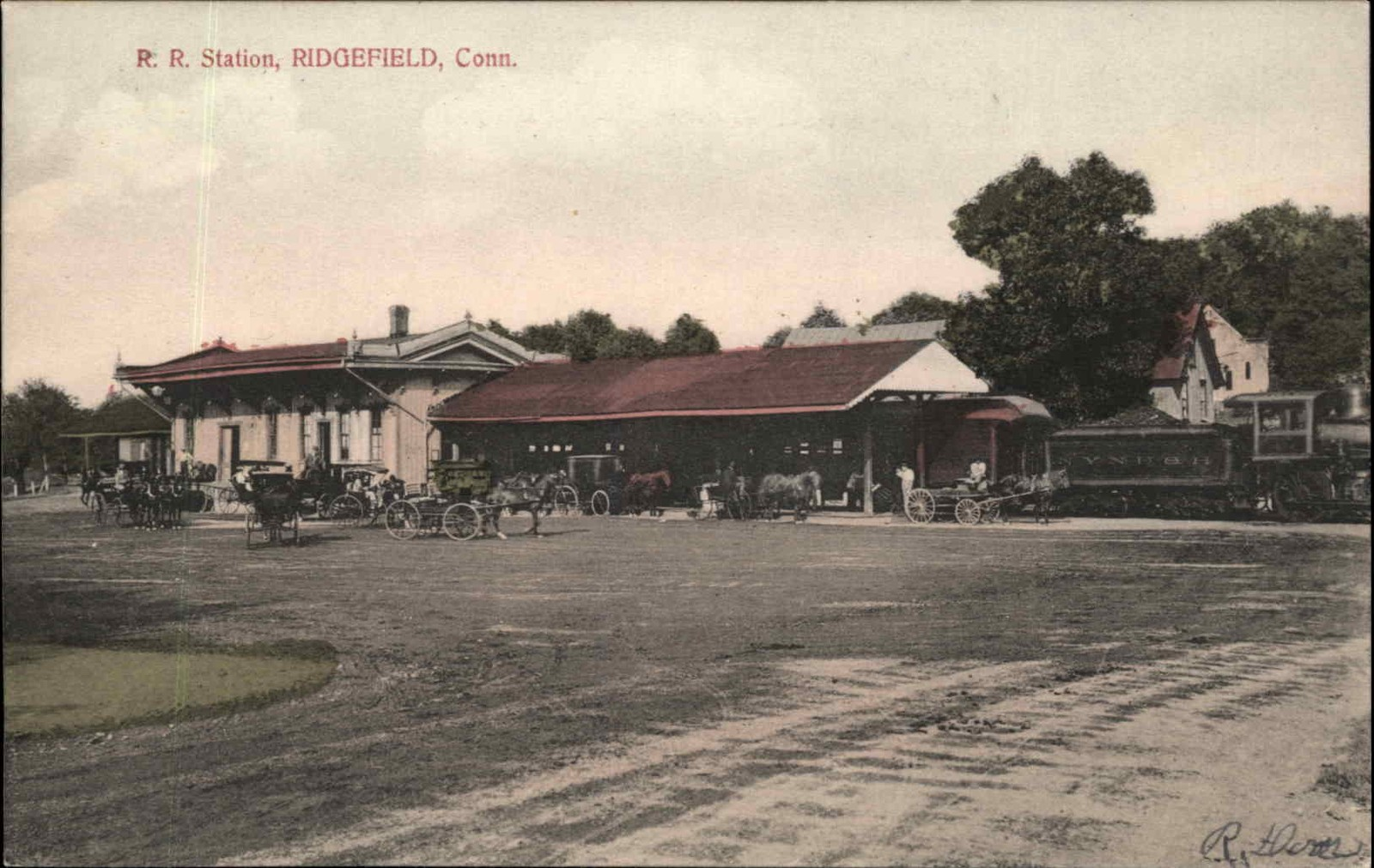
The station featured in a 1909 postcard.

Initially, the Ridgefield station was the only station on the branch, But later on, the stations of Florida and Cooper also opened on the line. On April 17, 1905, a train about 1 mile south of the station derailed after the coal tender derailed from the tracks. The accident killed the engineer, while injuring the fireman and inflicting minor injuries on the train's passengers. In 1925, amid electrification of the Danbury Branch, the railroad opted not to electrify the line and instead cut passenger service entirely, replacing service with New England Transportation Company buses instead. On August 8, 1925, the final passenger train ran on the Ridgefield Branch. Freight service continued to serve the station up until January 8, 1964, when the NYNH&H abandoned the Ridgefield Branch entirely.

=== After 1964 ===
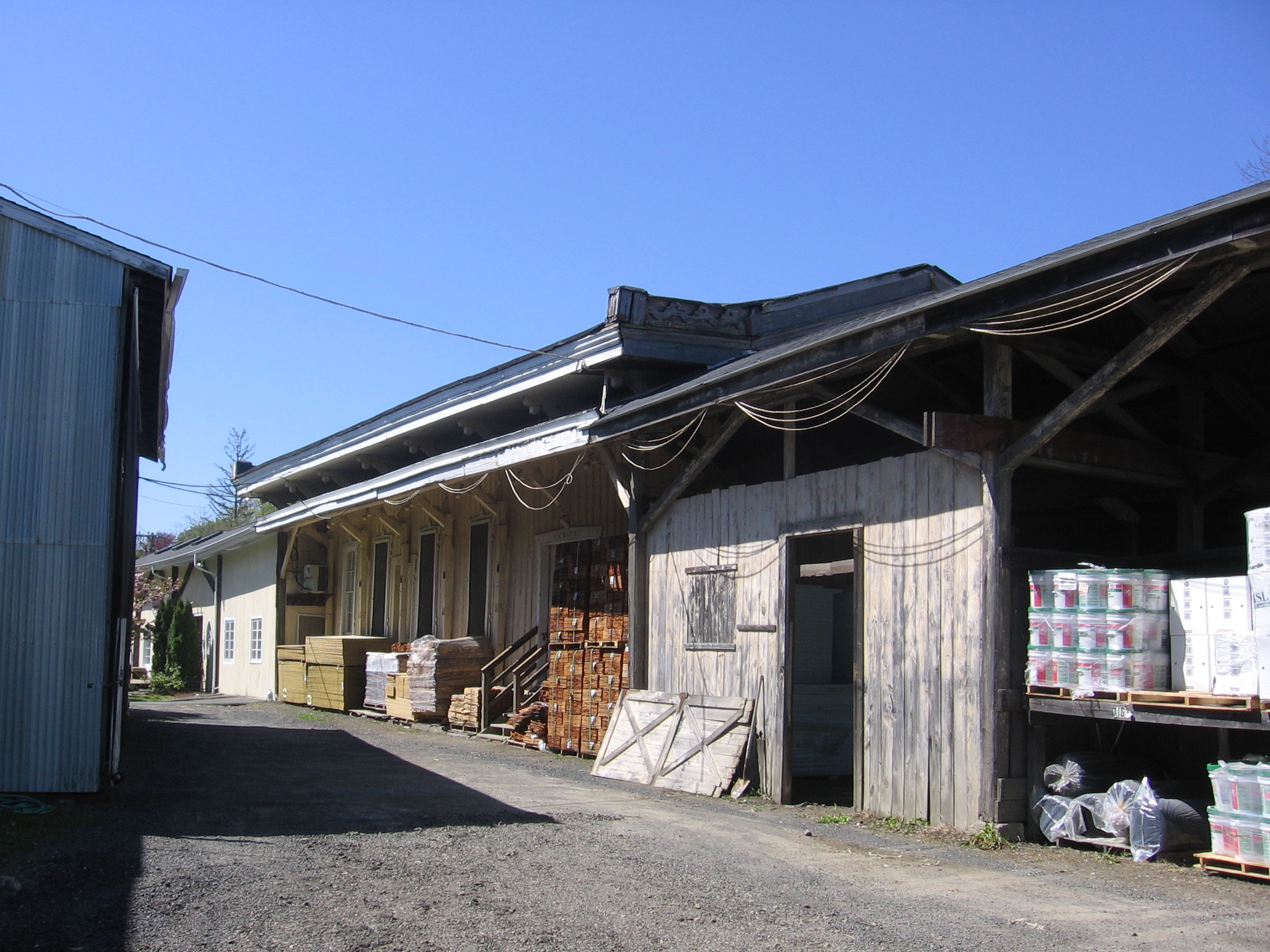
In use as lumber storage, 2012

Following its closure, the station would come to stand as a storage facility at the Ridgefield Supply Company until 2015, when it was razed and then rebuilt on the other side of the property, where the new structure retains the station's original appearance today.

== Station layout ==
The station, which consisted of the depot and a side platform, was located on the west side of the Ridgefield Branch ROW. The station building was noted for its interestingly shaped roof which was used for a rainwater-powered cistern.
