= Mamanasco Lake, Connecticut =

Census-designated place in Connecticut, United States

- Census-designated place
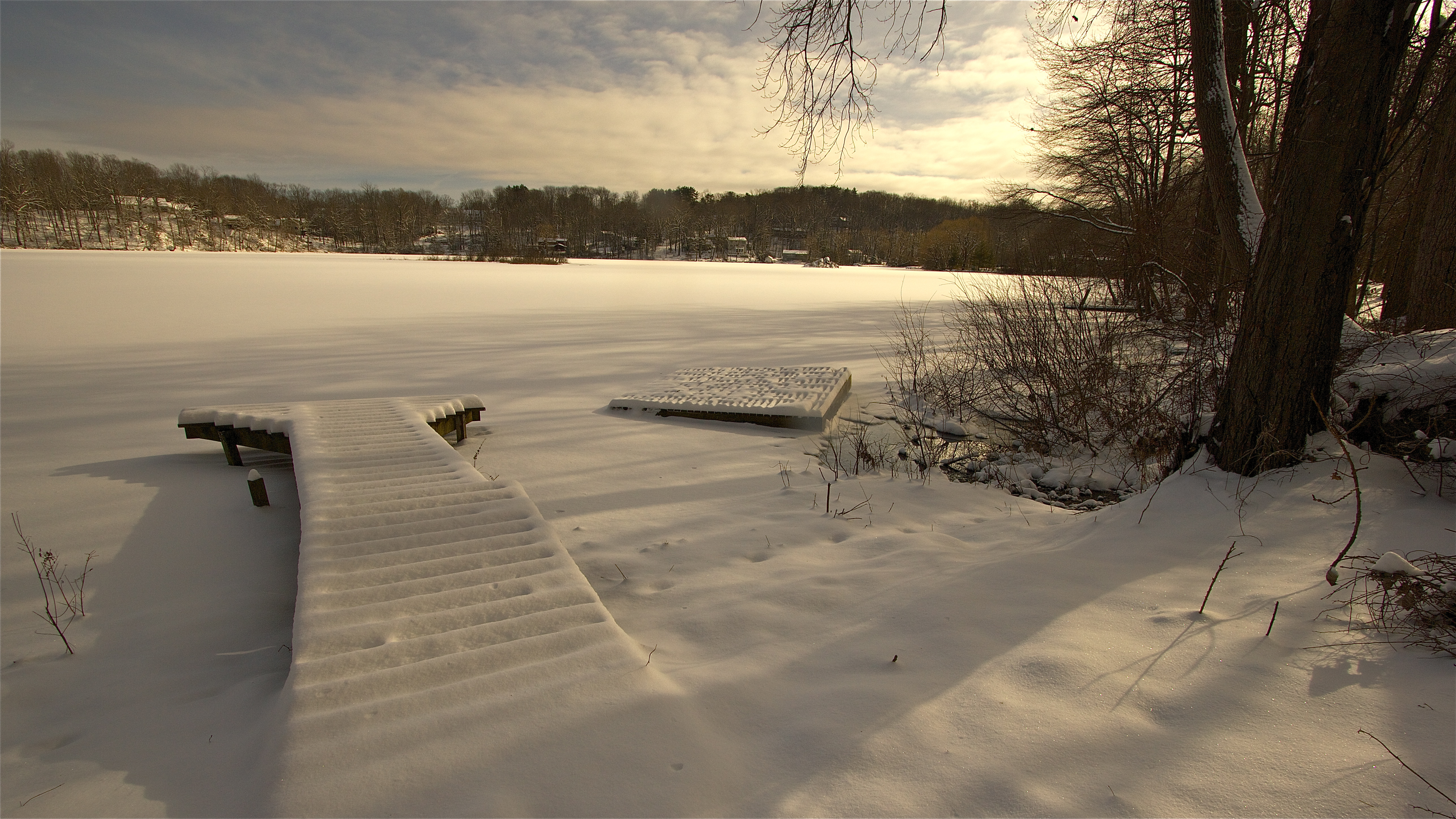
- A frozen Mamanasco Lake, 2022.

- Location within Connecticut Location within the United States
- Coordinates: 41°19′7″N 73°31′30″W
- Country: United States
- State: Connecticut
- County: Fairfield
- Town: Ridgefield

Area
  - Total: 0.54 sq mi (1.41 km^{2})
  - Land: 0.41 sq mi (1.06 km^{2})
  - Water: 0.14 sq mi (0.35 km^{2})
- Elevation: 578 ft (176 m)
- Time zone: UTC-5 (Eastern (EST))
  - Summer (DST): UTC-4 (EDT)
- ZIP Code: 06877 (Ridgefield)
- Area codes: 203/475
- FIPS code: 09-44660
- GNIS feature ID: 2805954

Mamanasco Lake is a census-designated place (CDP) in the town of Ridgefield, Fairfield County, Connecticut, United States. It is northwest of the center of Ridgefield and surrounds a lake of the same name. As of the 2020 census, Mamanasco Lake had a population of 509.

Mamanasco Lake was first listed as a CDP prior to the 2020 census.
