= Seth Low Pierrepont State Park Reserve =

State park in Connecticut, United States

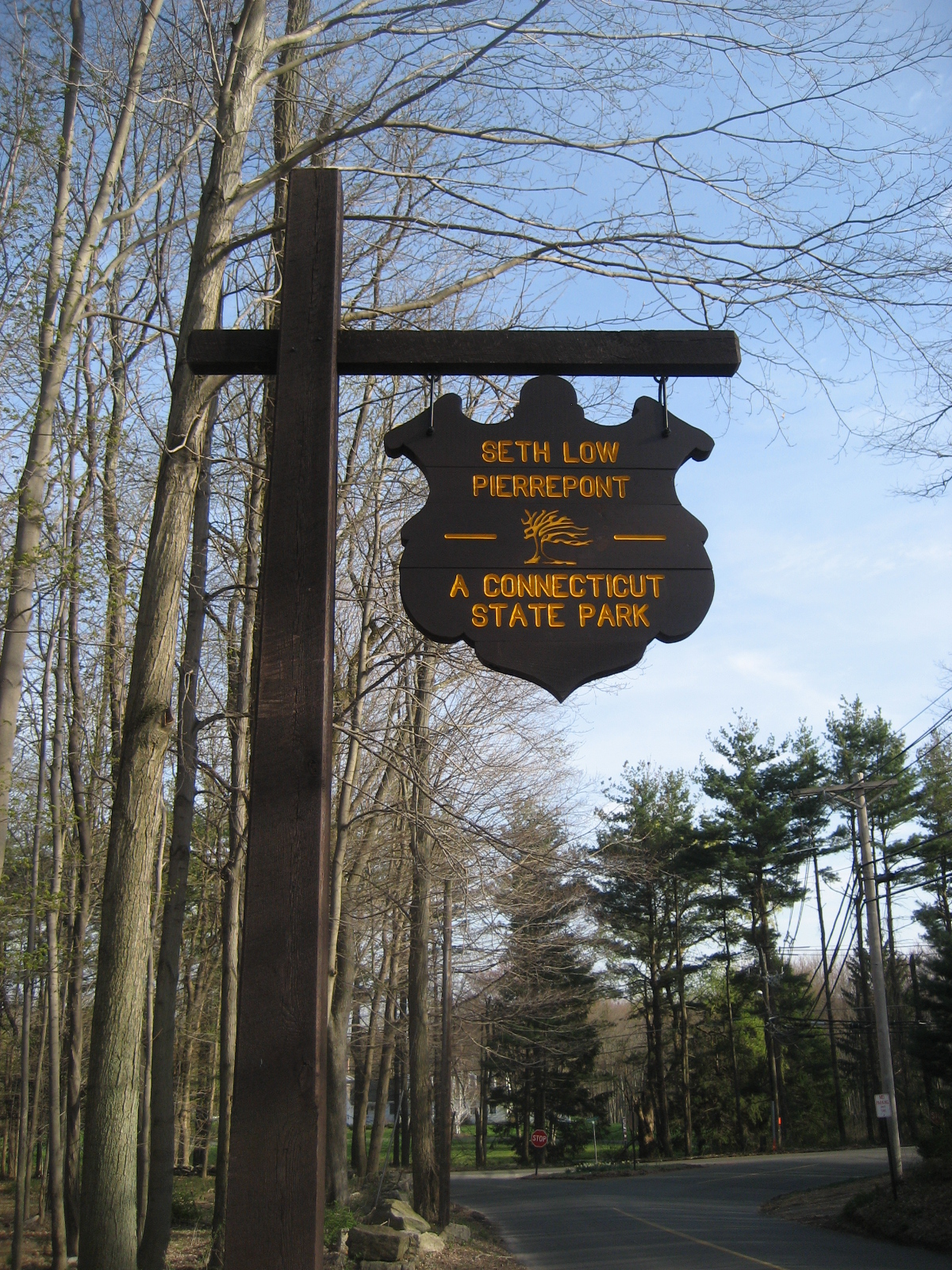

- Location within Connecticut Location within the United States
- Location: Ridgefield, Connecticut, United States
- Coordinates: 41°19′30″N 73°30′00″W
- Area: 305 acres (123 ha)
- Elevation: 958 ft (292 m)
- Designation: Connecticut state park
- Established: 1956
- Administrator: Connecticut Department of Energy and Environmental Protection
- Website: Seth Low Pierrepont; State Park Reserve

Seth Low Pierrepont State Park Reserve (also called Pierrepont State Park) is a public recreation area covering 305 acres (123 ha) in the town of Ridgefield, Connecticut. The state park offers opportunities for hiking, fishing, and boating.

== History ==
General Wooster led his troops down Old Barlow Mountain Road during the Revolutionary War. John Barlow's blacksmith shop was located here. An old foundation of the Scott House dating from the 1720s can be seen at the boat launch area. The stone walls and enclosures in the park were built by the Scott family when they farmed the land. Diplomat Seth Low Pierrepont purchased the land from the Scott family in the 1930s, improving the property by having a dam built at an "impassable swamp" and creating Lake Naraneka. He bequeathed a portion of his estate, including the south and eastern shores of the lake, to the state upon his death in 1956. The opposite shore of the lake was sold to developers by his widow.

== Activities and amenities ==
The park's five blazed trails include one around the south end of Lake Naraneka (Pierrepont Pond). The park's main trail is the white trail, which goes along Pierrepont Lake from the parking lot, ascends to the highest point in the park, and then descends to a minor entrance. Hiking is easy around the lake, but moderate, with steep sections everywhere else. The top of Barlow Mountain offers views of Pierrepont Lake, Redding hills, and on rare occasions, Long Island Sound. The park offers picnicking facilities, fishing, and a launch for non-motorized boating on 38-acre (15 ha) Lake Naraneka.

Non-motorized mountain biking is permitted by DEEP on trails in Seth Low Pierrepont State Park

The following is from the 2019 Connecticut Department of Energy and Environmental Protection (CT DEEP) map: "The trails at Seth Low Pierrepont State Park are non-motorized multi-use only."
