= Pine Mountain Reserve (Connecticut) =

Open space in Ridgefield, Connecticut, US

Coordinates: 41.350°N 73.487°W

Pine Mountain Reserve is a 368 acre open space in Ridgefield, Connecticut. The space has many trails, trail heads and also one of Ridgefield's highest points, at 1,021 feet (311 m) above sea level.

== Trail heads ==
The main entrance to the Pine Mountain Reserve is at the end of Pine Mountain Road, which is accessible from Danbury, Connecticut. Another entrance is from an access road off of Mountain Road. Other entrances are in other Ridgefield open spaces, such as the main entrance to Hemlock Hills open space (South Shore Drive). Once on the Hemlock Hills hiking trails, you can connect with the Pine Mountain Reserve via the red trail. Pine Mountain Reserve is also linked with Bennett's Pond Park, via the Bennett's Pond red and white trails, and Danbury's Wooster Mountain State Park, via the red and yellow blazed Ives Trail.

== Trails ==
A printable trail map can be viewed here. The main trail in the reserve is the yellow trail, which actually starts in Hemlock Hills open space. It comes into the Pine Mountain Reserve after crossing Pine Mountain Road. It then climbs up onto Pine Mountain, where it intersects with the red trail. A short while after, there is a view point overlooking the Ridgefield Lakes, and on clear days, the Long Island Sound is visible. It then splits into a loop, and circles around the true peak of Pine Mountain. Around the loop, there is an old chimney, and an old airplane tower. There is also an intersection with the Bennett's Pond red trail on the loop.

The red trail also starts in Hemlock Hills open space, but enters into the Pine Mountain before intersecting with the orange trail. It then heads north, intersects with the Bennett's Pond blue trail, and the Bennett's Pond white trail, before climbing up the side of Pine Mountain and ending at the yellow trail. The Orange Trail is a spur off the red trail, and leads to the Mountain Road entrance.
