= Ridgefield Rail Trail =

Rail trail in Ridgefield, Connecticut, US

- Length: 2.3 mi (3.7 km)
- Location: Ridgefield to Branchville, Connecticut
- Trailheads: Ridgefield; Branchville
- Use: Walking, Running, Cross Country Skiing
- Difficulty: Easy
- Surface: Cinder (with asphalt at all trailheads and street crossings)
- Right of way: Ridgefield Branch
- Maintainer: Connecticut Light and Power

The Ridgefield Rail Trail is a rail trail in Ridgefield, Connecticut. It follows an old rail corridor for 2.3 miles (3.7 km) from downtown Ridgefield to the Branchville section of town.

The trail can be used for walking, jogging, and cross-country skiing, and it is open from dawn to dusk, seven days a week throughout the year. The trail is lined with many trees native to New England. The trail's motto, which is displayed at the Ridgefield Trailhead is, "Take only photographs, leave only footprints, keep only memories".

== Historical development ==
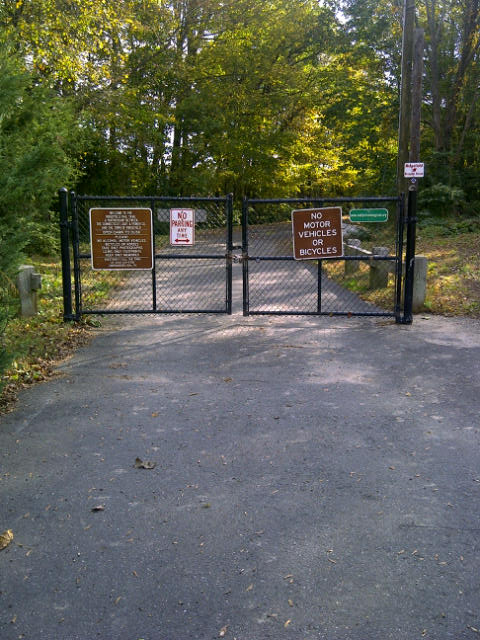
The Ridgefield Trailhead is the most used entrance to the trail. It also displays the trail guidelines.

Branchville was named for the Ridgefield Branch of the Danbury and Norwalk Railroad. The line was built in 1870. Passenger service on the branch line was available into town until 1925 and freight service lasted until 1964. While the area had been mostly farmland with a mill or two, the announcement of the railroad encouraged development. It included more mills, stores, a hotel, a machinery factory, a noted mineral quarry, a post office, and a school, which still stands.

The Ridgefield Rail Trail was built by Connecticut Light and Power and opened December 11, 2000. Connecticut Light and Power owns the abandoned rail corridor and built the rail trail at no cost to the town of Ridgefield. The project was spearheaded by First Selectman Rudy Marconi as an enhancement to open space and as the town's first ever off-road trail.

== Trail development ==
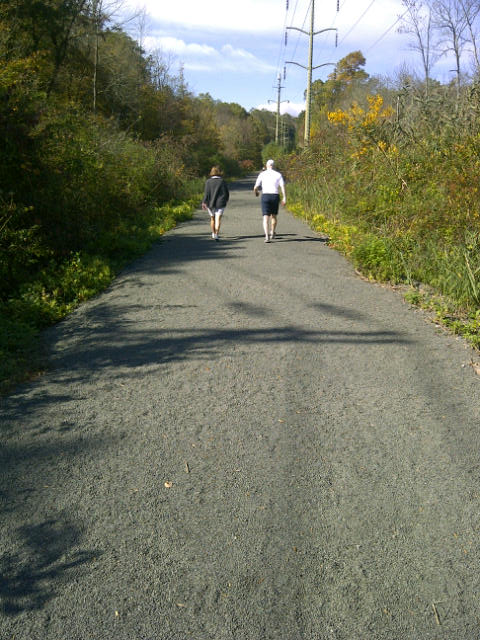
The Ridgefield Rail Trail going from the Branchville Trailhead towards the Ridgefield Trailhead.

The trail was designed by Bill O'Neill from the engineering firm Fuss & O'Neill. The majority of the trail is made of crushed cinder. The trail is asphalt at the entrance, exit and at all street crossings. The trail width varies throughout, ranging between six and ten feet (1.8 and 3.0 m).

Parking is available at the Ridgefield trailhead on Halpin Lane and at the Ridgefield Playhouse. There are benches located throughout the trail, as well as distance markers every 1/5 mile (320 m).

== Community ==
The Ridgefield Rail Trail is managed and maintained by Connecticut Light and Power. In certain situations, local Ridgefield residents have volunteered to help with maintenance. This has particularly occurred in an effort to paint over graffiti which have appeared on electrical poles.

Each year the Ridgefield Rail Trail hosts numerous hikes which are organized by The Ridgefield Discover Center. In recent years these have included the "Fall for Ridgefield Weekend Hike" and the "Hike off the Turkey".
