= Ridgefield Center Historic District =

Historic district in Connecticut, United States

- U.S. National Register of Historic Places
- U.S. Historic district
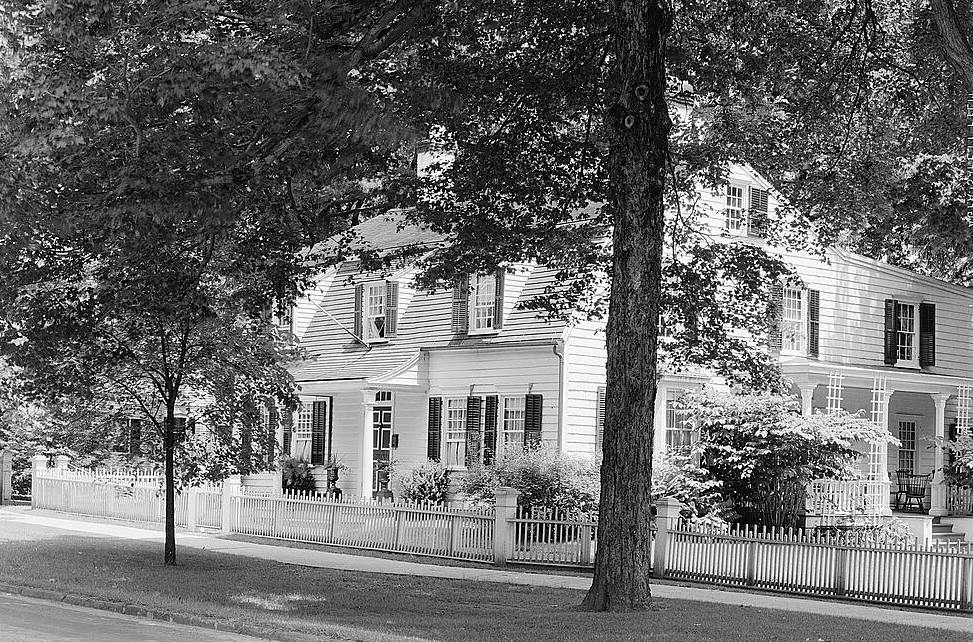
- Thomas Hawley House in 1937

- Location within Connecticut Location within the United States
- Location: Roughly bounded by Pound Street, Fairview Avenue, Prospect, Ridge, and Whipstick Roads, Ridgefield, Connecticut
- Coordinates: 41°16′35″N 73°29′52″W
- Area: 395 acres (160 ha)
- Architect: Gilbert, Cass; Et al.
- Architectural style: Mid 19th Century Revival, Late Victorian, Colonial Revival
- NRHP reference No.: 84000817
- Added to NRHP: September 07, 1984

The Ridgefield Center Historic District is part of the town of Ridgefield, Connecticut. It was listed on the National Register of Historic Places in 1984.

The district is an irregularly shaped area that is roughly bounded by Pound Street, Fairview Avenue, Prospect, Ridge, and Whipstick Roads. In 1984 it included 241 contributing buildings and one other contributing structure, over a 395 acres (160 ha) area.

Two properties, the Phineas Chapman Lounsbury House (now a community center) and the Keeler Tavern (purchased and renovated by architect Cass Gilbert and now a museum), were already separately listed in the National Register.

Other significant properties include:

- the Reverend Thomas Hawley House, c.1715
- the Nathan Scott House, at 5 Catoonah Street, which was moved there in 1922
- the former Episcopal Rectory, from 1790, which was moved to 23 Catoonah Street
- the Benedict House, c. 1790
- E. P. Dutton House
- Elizabeth W. Morris Memorial Building, which at the time of NRHP listing was home of the Ridgefield Library and Historical Association
- Maynard House, at 2 Peaceable Street, a c.1900 Neo-Georgian building locally believed to be designed by McKim, Meade & White
- 14 Barry Avenue, c. 1740, a Colonial house with early 20th-century Colonial Revival additions

== See also ==
- National Register of Historic Places listings in Fairfield County, Connecticut
