= Phineas Chapman Lounsbury House =

Historic house in Connecticut, United States

- Lounsbury House
- U.S. National Register of Historic Places
- U.S. Historic district – Contributing property
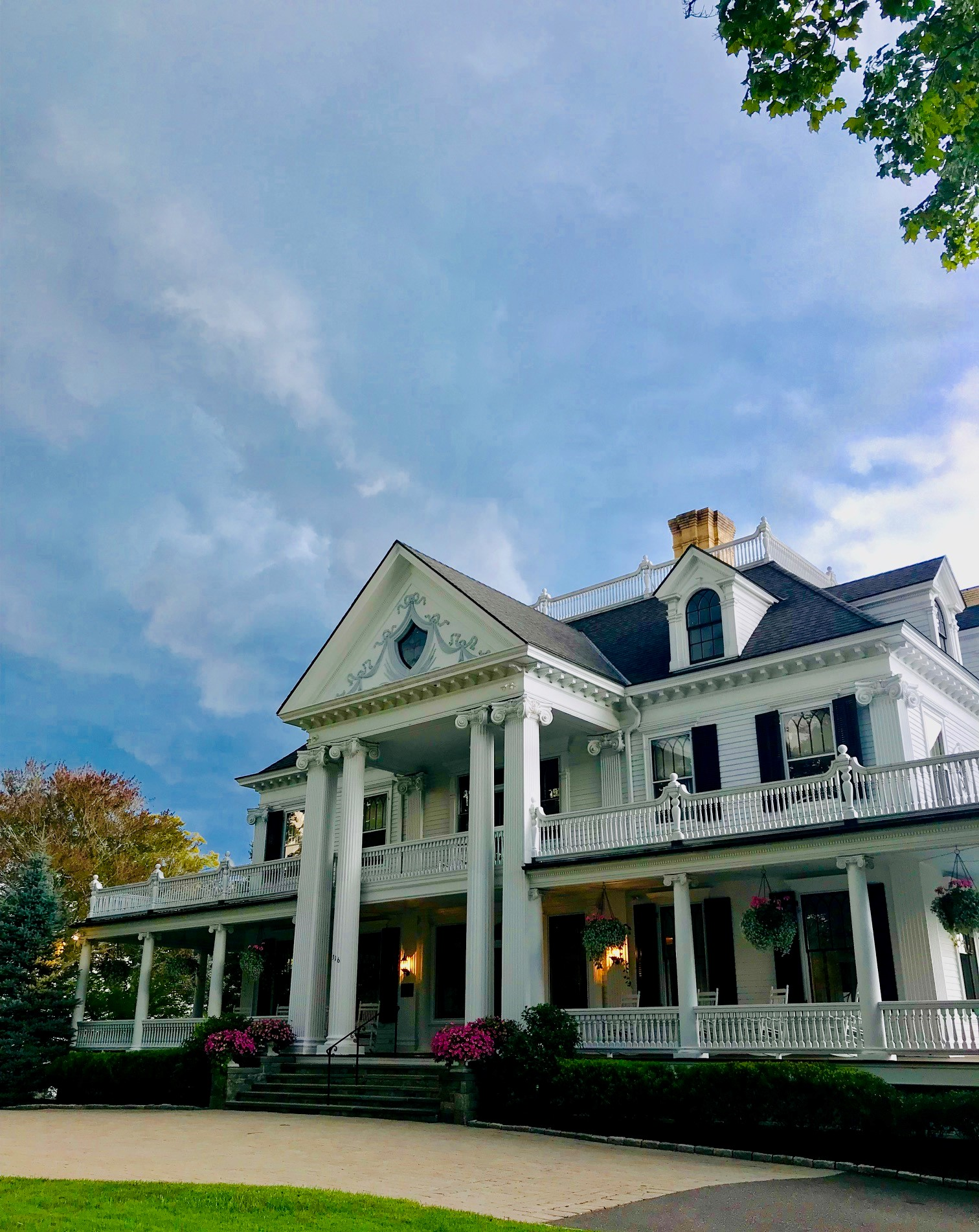
- Lounsbury House at dusk.

- Location within Connecticut Location within the United States
- Location: 316 Main Street, Ridgefield, Connecticut
- Coordinates: 41°16′46″N 73°29′52″W
- Area: 1 acre (0.40 ha)
- Built: 1895
- Architect: Charles C. Northrop
- Architectural style: Classical Revival
- Part of: Ridgefield Center Historic District (ID84000817)
- NRHP reference No.: 75001919

Significant dates
- Added to NRHP: October 03, 1975
- Designated CP: September 7, 1984

Lounsbury House, formerly known as Grovelawn and as the Ridgefield Veterans Memorial Community Center, is a historic house at 316 Main Street in Ridgefield, Connecticut. It is a two-story wood frame Classical Revival-style building that was built in 1895. Its design, by Charles Northrop, was an emulation of the Connecticut State Building exhibited at the 1893 Columbian Exposition, at the request of Governor Phineas C. Lounsbury, who attended the exhibition. It served as his family home. Lounsbury died in 1925, and the town bought the house from his heirs in 1945. The House and classic gardens now serve as a venue for weddings, corporate meetings, art gatherings, festivals and special events.

The building was listed on the National Register of Historic Places in 1975.

== See also ==
- National Register of Historic Places listings in Fairfield County, Connecticut
