= Sarah Benedict House =

Historic house in Ohio, United States

- U.S. National Register of Historic Places
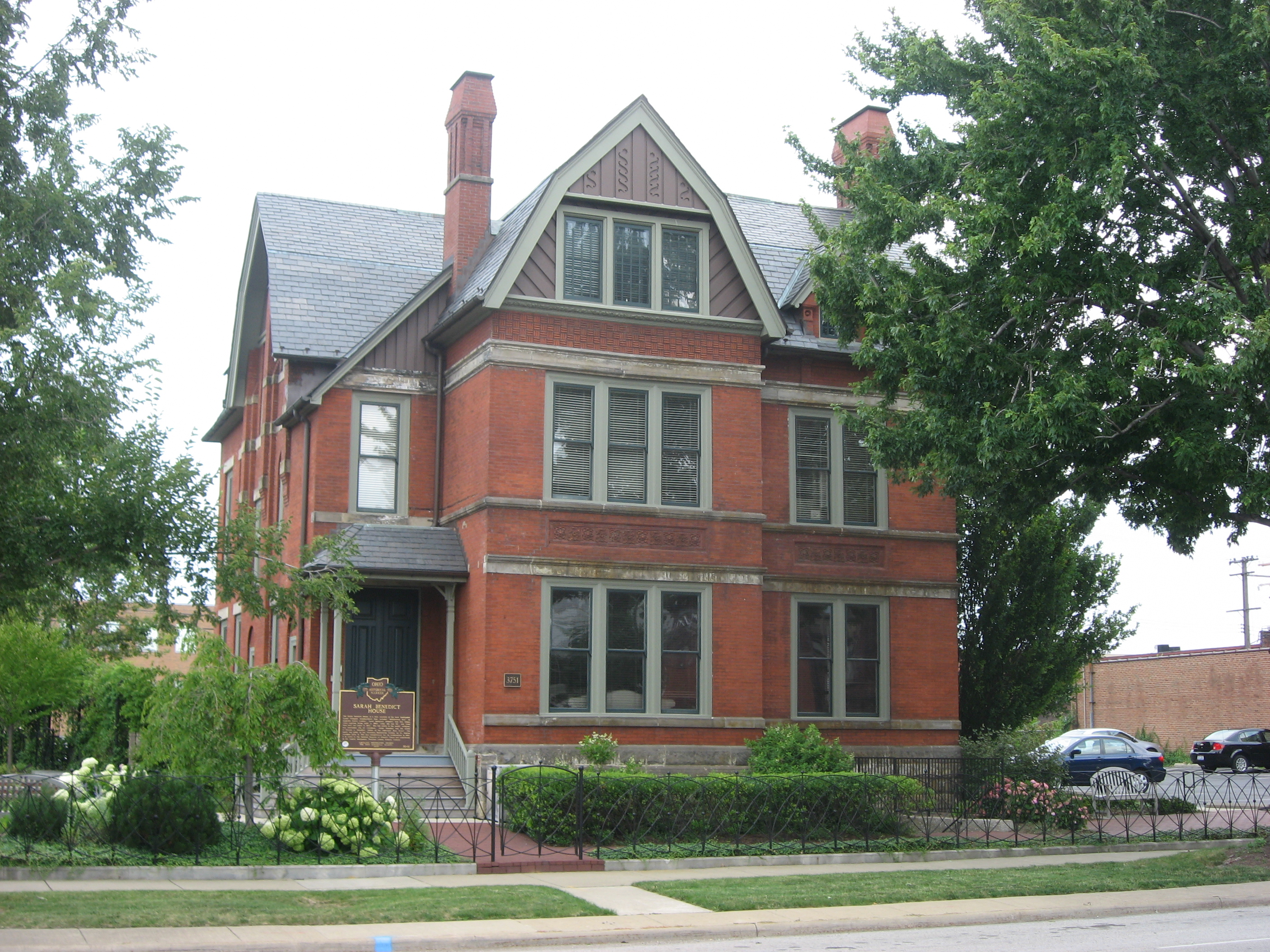
- Front of the house

- Location within Cleveland Location within Ohio Location within the United States
- Location: 3751 Prospect Ave., Cleveland, Ohio
- Coordinates: 41°30′8″N 81°39′41″W
- Area: Less than 1 acre (0.40 ha)
- Built: 1883
- Architectural style: Queen Anne
- MPS: Upper Prospect MRA
- NRHP reference No.: 84000220
- Added to NRHP: November 1, 1984

The Sarah Benedict House is located at 3751 Prospect Avenue in Cleveland, Ohio, United States. The house is listed in the National Register of Historic Places and is part of the Upper Prospect Avenue Historic District.

The brick Queen Anne-style house features asymmetrical massing, a hip roof, detailed masonry, irregular slate shingling and a tiled frieze between the first and second stories. The identity of the home's architect is unknown.

The house was built in 1883 for Sarah Rathbone Benedict, widow of Cleveland Herald publisher George A. Benedict. Widowed in 1876, Sarah Benedict lived in the home from its construction until shortly before her death in 1902 at the age of 87.

After her death, the Benedict House existed for many years as a single-family residence. As the Upper Prospect neighborhood transitioned during the early 20th century to a center for Cleveland's automobile retail sales and other commercial uses, the property served as a boarding house, office building and for light manufacturing. It later became "The Library," a popular bar for students at nearby Cleveland State University.

The house was renovated by the Cleveland Restoration Society to allow for its use by the Society as its headquarters and for office space. The house can also be rented for special occasions.

Tours of the building's interior are by appointment only and are free to CRS members.
