= Keeler Tavern =

- Keeler Tavern Museum & History Center
- U.S. National Register of Historic Places
- U.S. Historic district – Contributing property
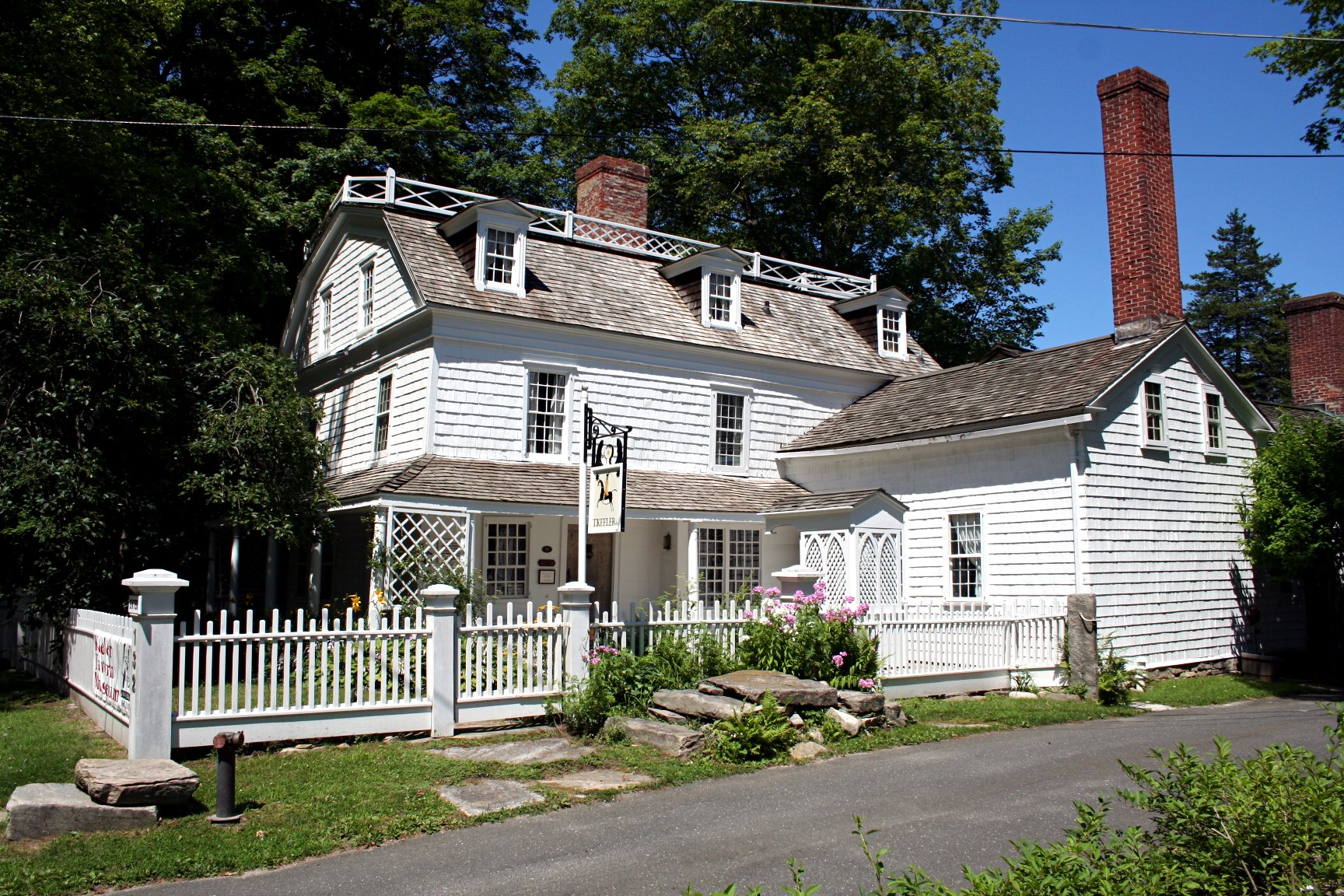
- Keeler Tavern Museum seen from Main Street

- Location within Connecticut Location within the United States
- Location: 152 Main Street, Ridgefield, Connecticut
- Coordinates: 41°16′22″N 73°29′50″W
- Area: 2.2 acres (0.89 ha)
- Built: c. 1713
- Architect: Benjamin Hoyt et al; Cass Gilbert
- Architectural style: Colonial Revival, Georgian
- Website: keelertavernmuseum.org
- Part of: Ridgefield Center Historic District (ID84000817)
- NRHP reference No.: 82004345

Significant dates
- Added to NRHP: April 29, 1982
- Designated CP: September 7, 1984

The Keeler Tavern is an 18th-century historical building at 152 Main Street in the center of Ridgefield, Connecticut, United States. The property served as summer home to architect Cass Gilbert, who purchased it in 1907 and designed additions to the building as well as a garden.

It is also significant for the part it played in the Battle of Ridgefield when British forces passed through, in 1777. The site was placed on the National Register of Historic Places in 1982 and is operated as the Keeler Tavern Museum & History Center (KTM&HC). It is also included in the Ridgefield Center Historic District, NRHP-listed in 1984.

== History ==
The town of Ridgefield exists on the ancestral homelands of the Ramapough, Munsee Lenape, and Wiechquasegeck band of the Wappinger people.

=== 18th century ===
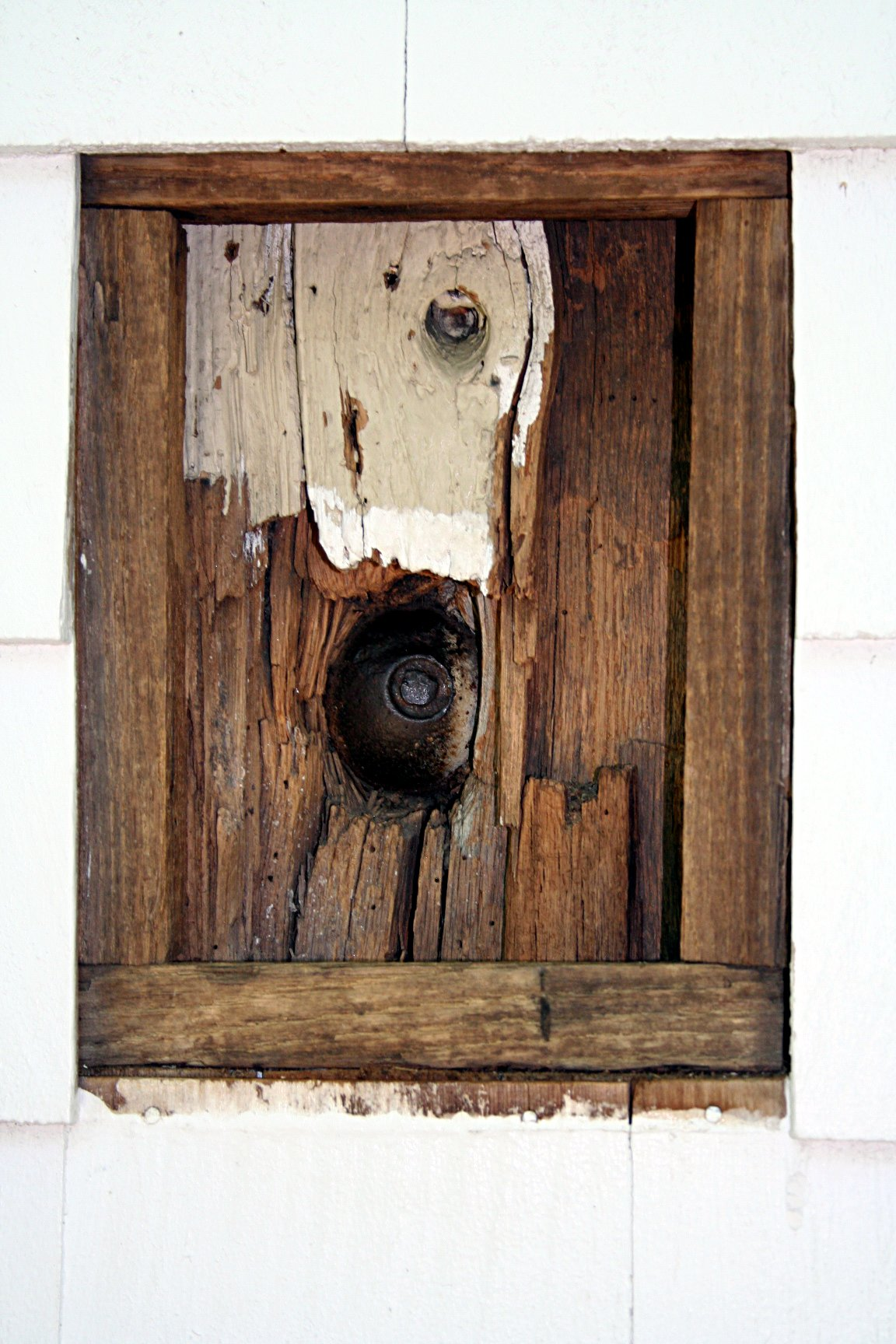
British cannonball lodged in a corner post

In 1708, a group of Norwalk families paid the Ramapough 100 pounds sterling for 20,000 acres of land that would become Ridgefield. The land along the main roadway was divided into "lotts" of 7.5 acres each, and this site, owned by Benjamin Hoyt, was Lott 2. Hoyt built the original single story, one room structure on the site; by the 1750s, the farmhouse was two and a half stories.

Hoyt's nephew Timothy Keeler purchased the home in 1769 and, with his wife Esther, turned it into Keeler's Inn, a tavern with lodging situated on a busy postal route between Hartford to New York City. On April 27, 1777 during the Battle of Ridgefield -- a significant strategic victory for the Continental Army in the American Revolutionary War -- the tavern was bombarded by the attacking British army. One of these cannonballs remains embedded in the tavern's northern corner post to this day.

=== 19th century ===
In 1815, William Keeler inherited the tavern from his father Timothy and operated the inn together with his sister Anna as the "W. Keeler's Hotel" until his death in 1827, at which point Anna received total ownership of the hotel. Anna married Abijah Resseguie, and the Resseguies owned the property - turning the tavern into the Resseguie Hotel - until the twentieth century. Anna and Abijah Resseguie had one child, Anna Marie, who was born in 1830. After her parents death, during the Civil War era, Anna Marie Resseguie ran the business with Phillis DuBois, a Black woman, who the Resseguie family had "taken in" as a child for "care and service." Though living at the site after slavery was abolished in Connecticut, Phillis was not paid for her work until she was in her 30s.

=== 20th century ===
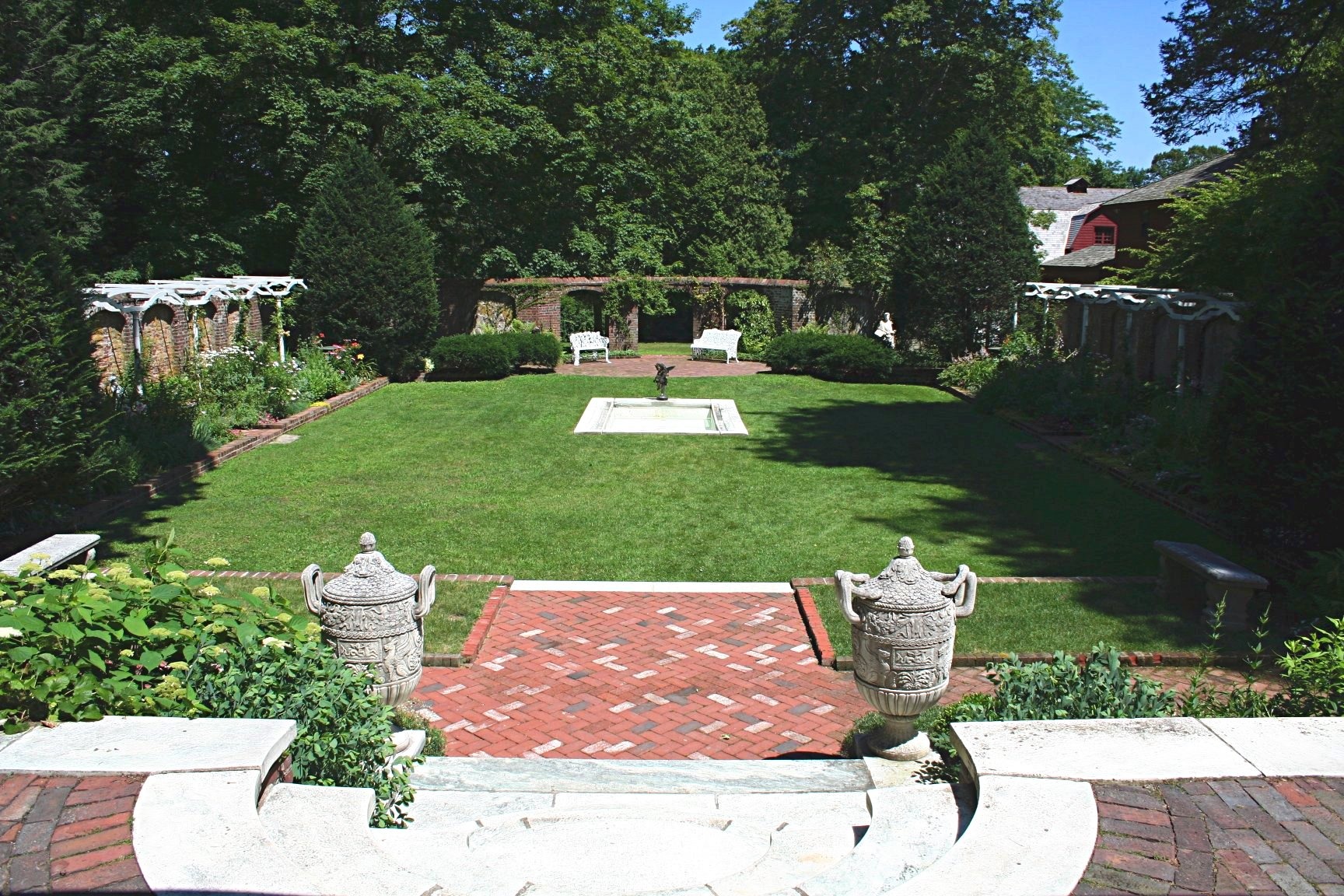
Charleston Garden designed by Cass Gilbert

Cass Gilbert, a renowned architect, purchased the property from Anna Marie and turned it into his family's summer home in 1907. Gilbert added an ell to the tavern building, and he also designed and built the Garden House, Walled Garden, and Carriage Barn during his years owning the property. After Gilbert's death, his widow Julia built a Memorial Library on the site in 1937 - this building is now the Visitor Center. In 1966, preservation-minded community members founded the Keeler Tavern Preservation Society, Inc. and purchased the site, which has operated continuously as a museum since then.

== KTM&HC ==
The KTM&HC museum offers public programming onsite and virtually, special events, education programs for school groups and visitors of all ages, and collaborates with local arts and culture organizations.

It is located at 152 Main Street, Ridgefield, CT 06877, USA, across from a large Cass Gilbert-designed fountain at the intersection of Rts. 33 and 35.

== See also ==
- National Register of Historic Places listings in Fairfield County, Connecticut
- List of the oldest buildings in Connecticut
