= Ridgefield, Connecticut =

Town in Connecticut, United States

- Town
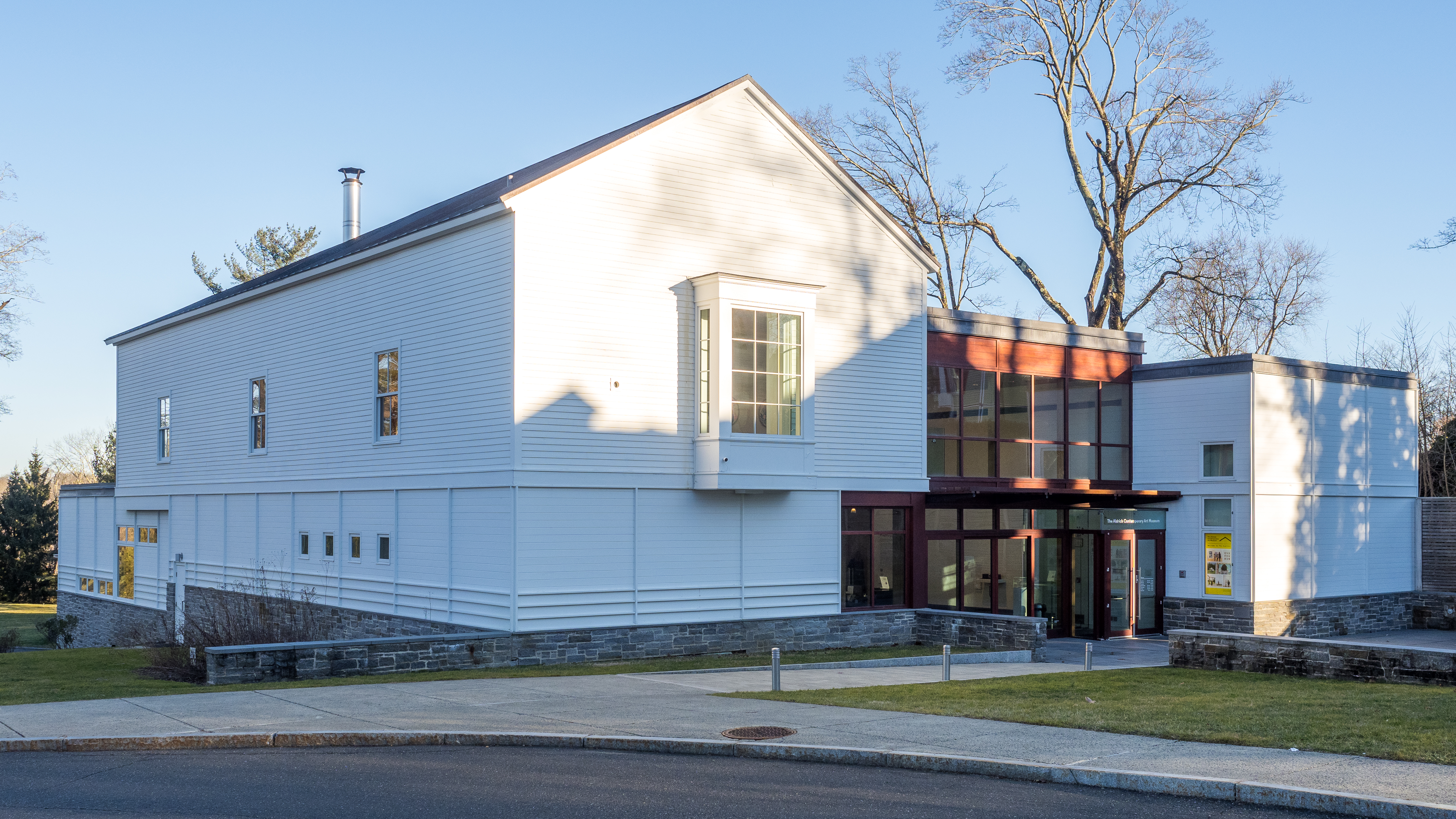
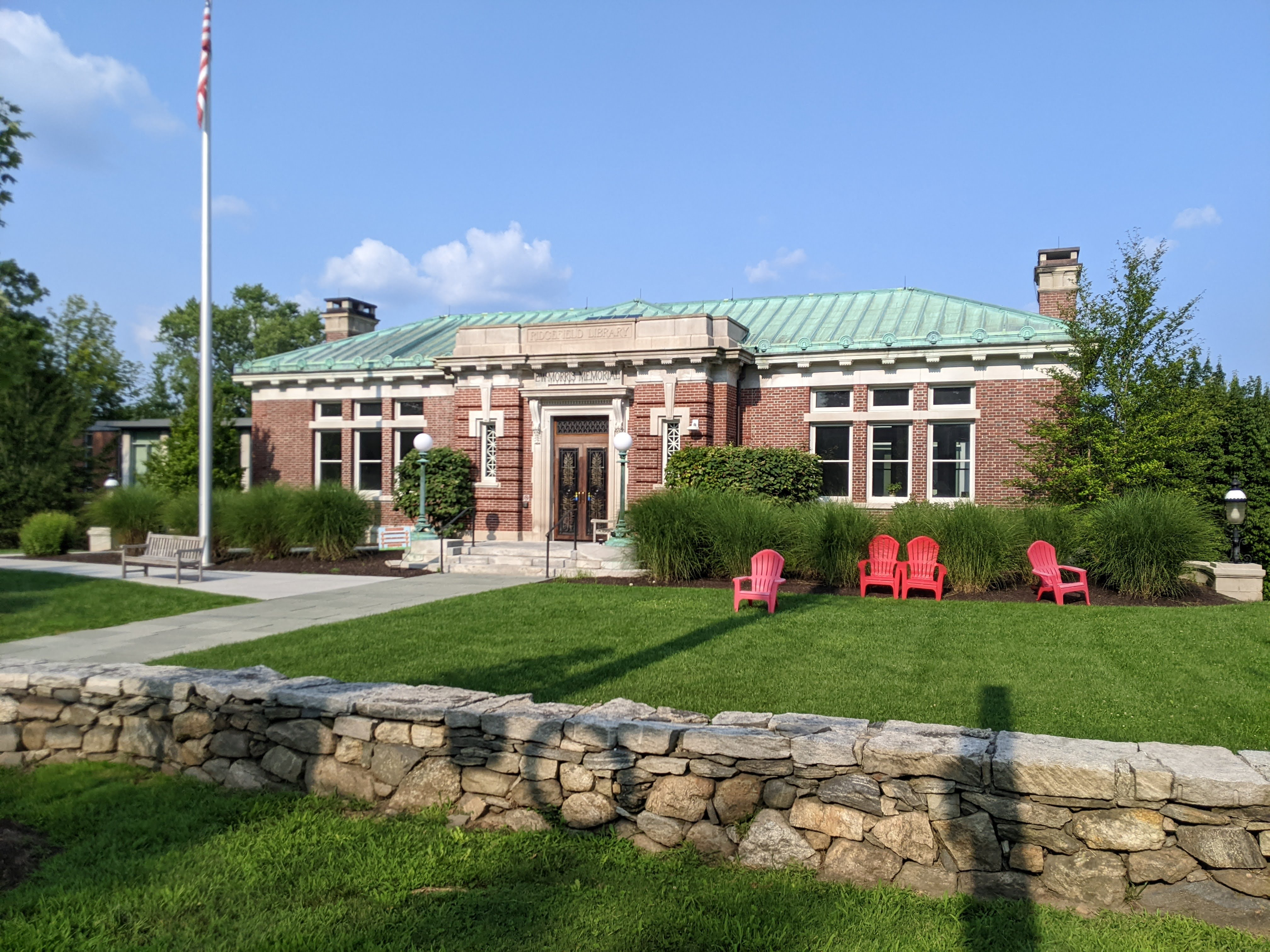
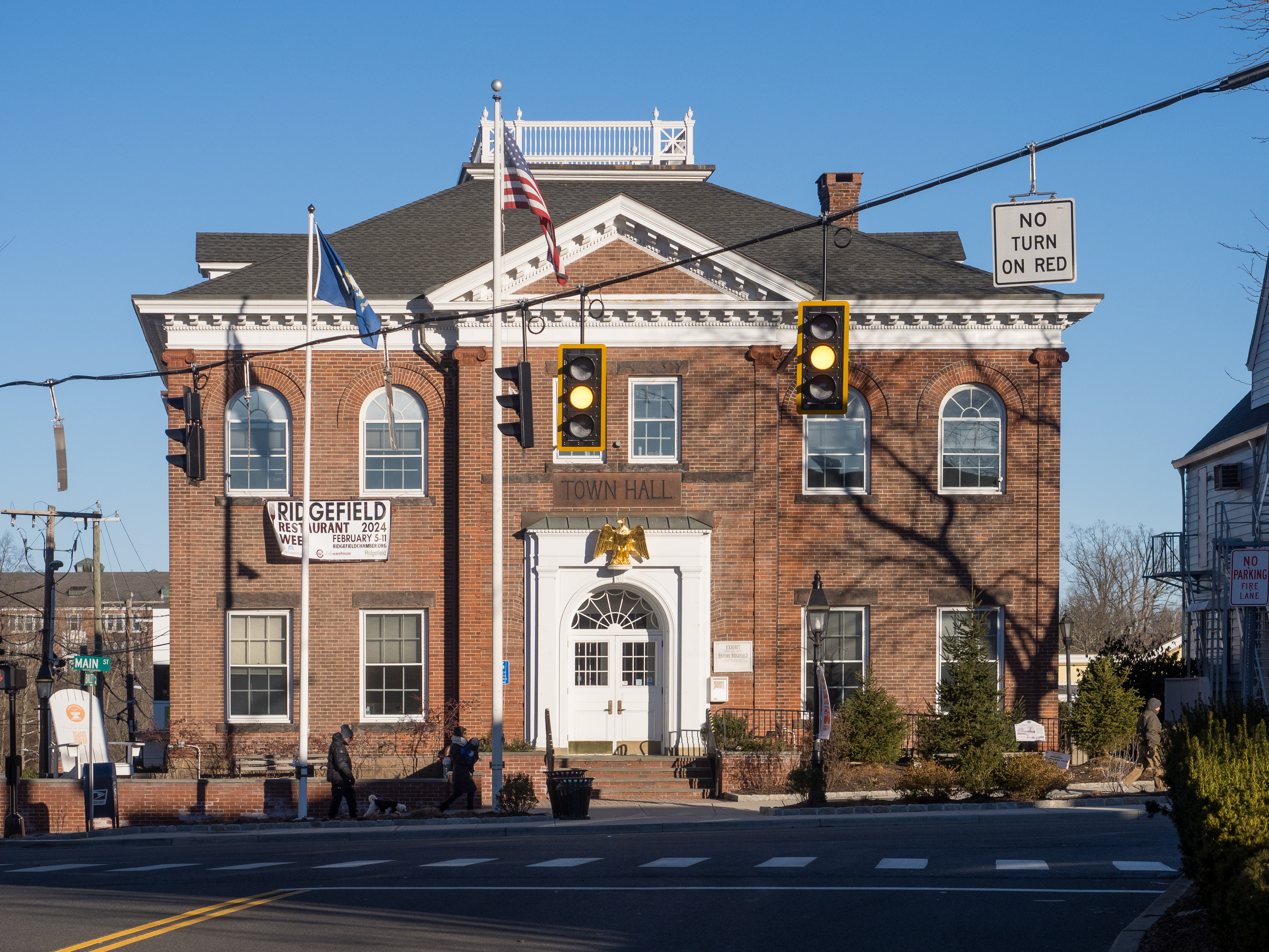
- Aldrich Contemporary Art Museum Ridgefield Library Ballard Park Town Hall

- Seal

- Coordinates: 41°18′19″N 73°30′05″W
- Country: United States
- U.S. state: Connecticut
- County: Fairfield
- Region: Western CT
- Incorporated: 1709
- Villages: Ridgefield; Branchville; Ridgebury; Titicus; Farmingville

Government
  - Type: Selectman-town meeting
  - First selectman: Rudy Marconi (D)
  - Selectperson: Sean Connelly (D); Barbara Manners (D); Geoffrey Morris (R); Maureen Kozlark (U)
  - Connecticut House of Representatives: Aimee Berger-Girvalo (D); Rachel Chaleski (R)

Area
  - Total: 35.0 sq mi (90.6 km^{2})
  - Land: 34.4 sq mi (89.2 km^{2})
  - Water: 0.54 sq mi (1.4 km^{2})
- Elevation: 659 ft (201 m)

Population (2020)
  - Total: 25,033
  - Density: 727.7/sq mi (281.0/km^{2})
- Time zone: UTC−5 (Eastern)
  - Summer (DST): UTC−4 (Eastern)
- ZIP Code: 06877
- Area codes: 203/475
- FIPS code: 09-63970
- GNIS feature ID: 0213496
- Website: www.ridgefieldct.org

Ridgefield is a town in Fairfield County, Connecticut. Situated on the New York state border, Ridgefield had a population of 25,033 as of the 2020 census. The town is part of the Western Connecticut Planning Region. The town center, which was formerly a borough, is defined by the U.S. Census Bureau as a census-designated place. The town was settled then quickly incorporated by 1709.

== History ==
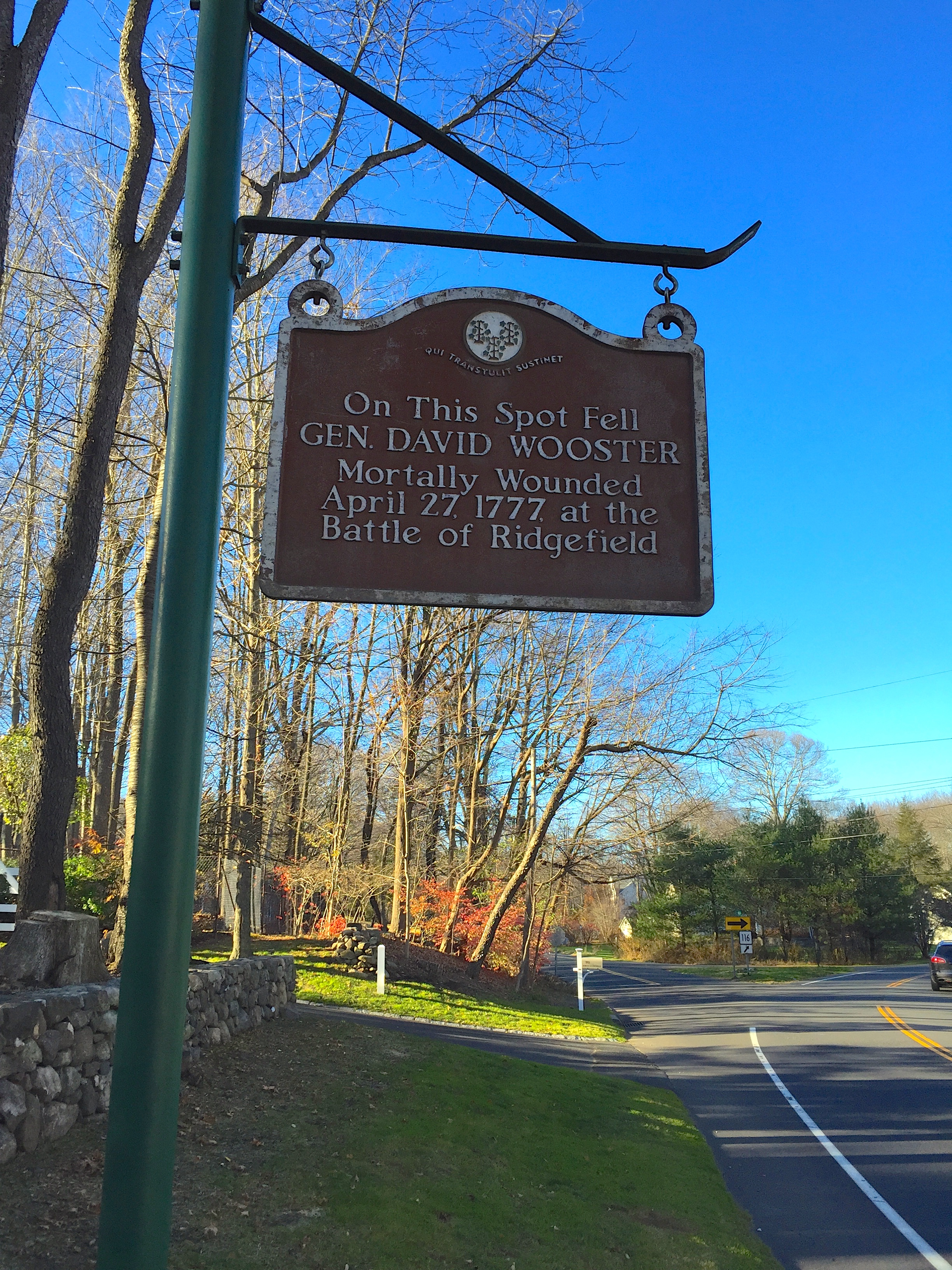
David Wooster Historical Marker

Ridgefield was settled by English colonists from Norwalk in 1708, when a group of them purchased land from Chief Catoonah of the Ramapo tribe. The town was incorporated under a royal charter from the Connecticut General Assembly issued in 1709. Ridgefield was descriptively named. Its most significant 18th-century event was the Battle of Ridgefield on April 27, 1777. This American Revolutionary War skirmish involved a small colonial militia force (state militia and some Continental Army soldiers), led by, among others, General David Wooster, who died in the engagement, and Benedict Arnold, whose horse was shot from under him. They faced a larger British force that had landed at Westport and was returning from a raid on the colonial supply depot in Danbury. The battle was a tactical victory for the British but a strategic one for the Colonials because the British would never again conduct inland operations in Connecticut, despite western Connecticut's strategic importance in securing the Hudson River Valley. The dead from both sides are buried together in a small cemetery on Main Street on the right of the entrance to Casagmo condominiums: "...foes in arms, brothers in death...". The Keeler Tavern, a local inn and museum, features a British cannonball still lodged in the side of the building. There are many other landmarks from the Revolutionary War in the town, with most along Main Street.

In the summer of 1781, the French army under the Comte de Rochambeau marched through Connecticut, encamping in the Ridgebury section of town, where the first Catholic mass in Ridgefield was offered.

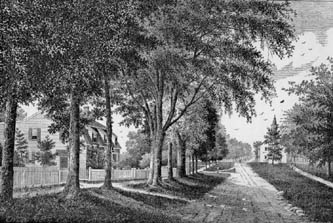
Main Street, looking south, c. 1875

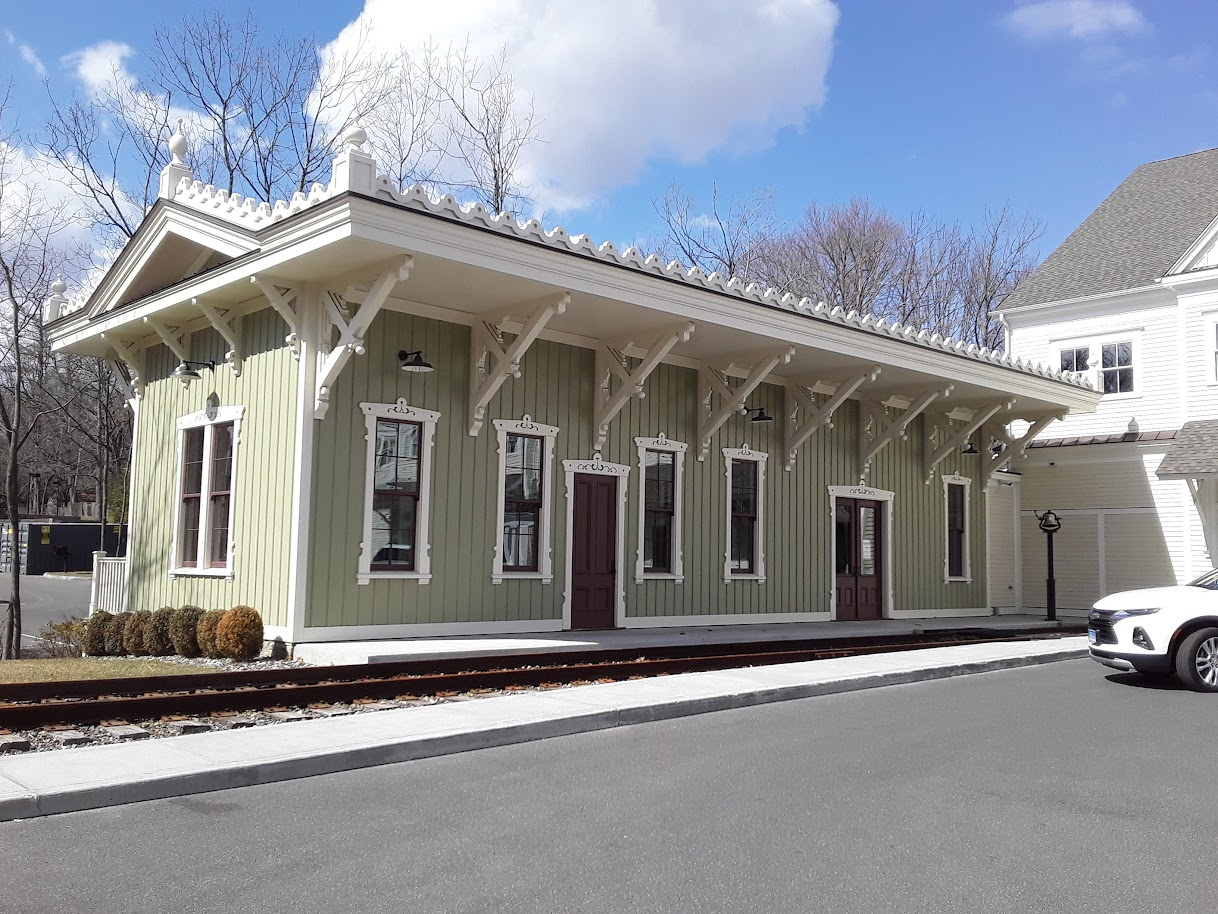
A reconstruction of Ridgefield station, located on the former Ridgefield Branch of the New York, New Haven and Hartford Railroad

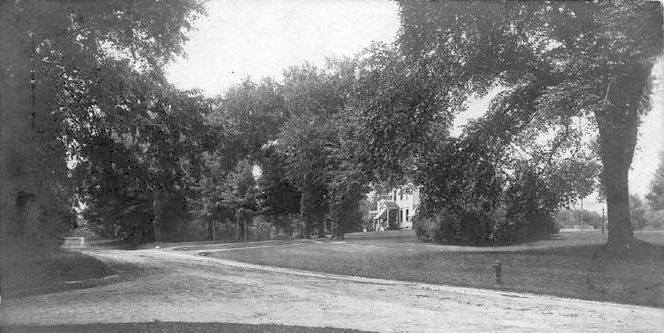
Main Street, looking south from Branchville Road, c. 1906

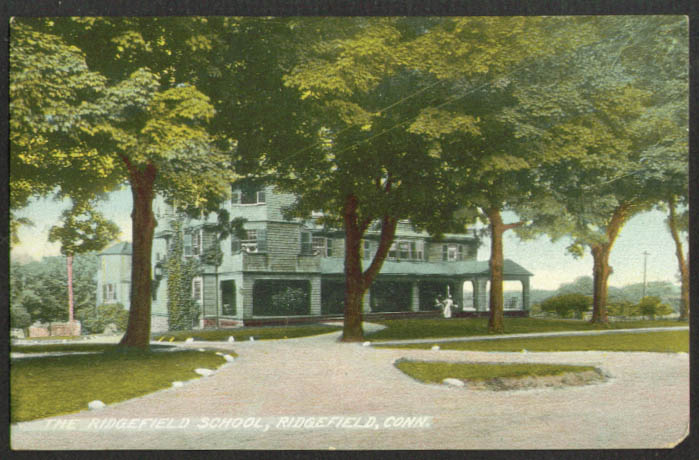
The Ridgefield School (postcard sent in 1909)

For much of its three centuries, Ridgefield was a farming community. Among the important families in the 19th century were the Rockwells and Lounsburys, which intermarried. They produced two Connecticut governors, brothers and business partners George Lounsbury and Phineas Lounsbury. The Ridgefield Veterans Memorial Community Center on Main Street, also called the Lounsbury House, was built by Gov. Phineas Chapman Lounsbury around 1896 as his primary residence. The Lounsbury Farm near the Florida section of Ridgefield is one of the only remaining operational farms in Ridgefield.

In the late 19th century, spurred by the new railroad connection to its village and the fact that nearby countryside reaches 1,000 feet (300 m) above sea level, Ridgefield began to be discovered by wealthy New York City residents, who assembled large estates and built huge "summer cottages" throughout the higher sections of town. Among the more prominent estates were Col. Louis D. Conley's "Outpost Farm", which at one point totaled nearly 2,000 acres (8.1 km^{2}), some of which became Bennett's Pond State Park; Seth Low Pierrepont's "Twixthills", more than 600 acres (2.4 km^{2}), much of it Pierrepont State Park; Frederic E. Lewis's "Upagenstit", 100 acres (0.40 km^{2}) that became Grey Court College in the 1940s, but is mostly subdivisions; and Col. Edward M. Knox's "Downesbury Manor", whose 300 acres (1.2 km^{2}) included a 45-room mansion that Mark Twain often visited.

These and dozens of other estates became unaffordable and unwieldy during and after the Great Depression, and most were broken up. Many mansions were razed. In their place came subdivisions of one- and 2-acre (8,100 m^{2}) lots that turned the town into a suburban, bedroom community in the 1950s, 1960s, and 1970s. However, strict planning and zoning has frozen development and locked in the aesthetic appearance of the 19th- and early 20th-century through to the 21st-century, especially along its famous mile-long Main Street.

In 1946, Ridgefield was one of the locations considered for the United Nations Secretariat building, but was not chosen due to its relative inaccessibility.

== Geography ==
According to the United States Census Bureau, the town has a total area of 35.0 square miles (91 km^{2}), of which 34.4 square miles (89 km^{2}) is land and 0.5 square miles (1.3 km^{2}), or 1.52%, is water. Ridgefield is bordered by the towns of North Salem and Lewisboro in Westchester County, New York and the town of Southeast in Putnam County, New York to the west, Danbury to the north, Wilton to the south and Redding to the east.

The Metro-North Railroad's Branchville station is in the Branchville corner of town. The census-designated place (CDP) corresponding to the town center covers a total area of 6.4 square miles (17 km^{2}), of which 0.16% is water. Other locales within the town include Titicus on Route 116 just north of the village; Ridgebury in the northern section of town; Scotland, which is south of Ridgebury; Farmingville, located northeast and east of the town center; Limestone, located northeast of the town center; Flat Rock, located south of the town center; and Florida, located just north of Branchville.

=== Geology ===
Ridgefield consists of hilly, rocky terrain, ranging from 342 feet (104 m) above sea level at Branchville to 1,060 feet (320 m) (at Pine Mountain). Its average village elevation is 725 feet (221 m) above sea level. The landscape is strewn with countless rocks deposited by glaciers, and among the town's bodies of water is Round Pond, formed in a kettle left by the last glacier 20,000 years ago. Another interesting body of water in the town is Mamanasco Lake, an 86-acre (35 ha) lake near Ridgefield High School. A particularly interesting feature is Cameron's Line, named for Eugene N. Cameron, who discovered that rocks west of the line differed greatly from those east of it. This fault line was formed some 250 million years ago by the collision of "Proto North America" and "Proto Africa", and there are still occasional light earthquakes felt along its length. The line bisects the southern half of the town, running generally north of West Lane, across the north end of the village, past the south end of Great Swamp and generally easterly into Redding in the Topstone area. North of Cameron's Line, the town is rich in limestone. The mineral was extensively mined, and remnants of several limekilns exist today. Also mined here in the 19th century was mica, pegmatite, and quartz. Gold, as well as gemstones such as garnet and beryl, have been found here, and dozens of minerals have been unearthed at the old Branchville Mica Quarry. Uraninite, a source of uranium, is found here, too.

=== Climate ===
Climate data for Ridgefield, Connecticut
Month	Jan	Feb	Mar	Apr	May	Jun	Jul	Aug	Sep	Oct	Nov	Dec	Year
Record high °F (°C)	71 (22)	77 (25)	92 (33)	95 (35)	97 (36)	98 (37)	106 (41)	103 (39)	100 (38)	89 (32)	82 (28)	76 (24)	106 (41)
Mean daily maximum °F (°C)	36 (2)	40 (4)	49 (9)	61 (16)	72 (22)	81 (27)	85 (29)	83 (28)	75 (24)	63 (17)	51 (11)	40 (4)	61 (16)
Mean daily minimum °F (°C)	19 (−7)	22 (−6)	29 (−2)	39 (4)	48 (9)	59 (15)	64 (18)	62 (17)	53 (12)	42 (6)	34 (1)	25 (−4)	41 (5)
Record low °F (°C)	−18 (−28)	−10 (−23)	−9 (−23)	14 (−10)	26 (−3)	36 (2)	40 (4)	38 (3)	28 (−2)	19 (−7)	10 (−12)	−11 (−24)	−18 (−28)
Average rainfall inches (mm)	3.76 (96)	3.30 (84)	4.43 (113)	4.36 (111)	4.57 (116)	4.74 (120)	4.99 (127)	4.55 (116)	4.66 (118)	4.89 (124)	4.54 (115)	4.16 (106)	52.95 (1,345)

== Demographics ==
Historical population
Census	Pop.	Note	%±
1790	1,947		—
1800	2,025		4.0%
1810	2,103		3.9%
1820	2,310		9.8%
1830	2,305		−0.2%
1840	2,474		7.3%
1850	2,337		−5.5%
1860	2,213		−5.3%
1870	1,919		−13.3%
1880	2,028		5.7%
1890	2,235		10.2%
1900	2,626		17.5%
1910	3,118		18.7%
1920	2,707		−13.2%
1930	3,580		32.2%
1940	3,900		8.9%
1950	4,356		11.7%
1960	8,165		87.4%
1970	18,188		122.8%
1980	20,120		10.6%
1990	20,919		4.0%
2000	23,643		13.0%
2010	24,638		4.2%
2020	25,033		1.6%
Population 1756–2000

As of the census of 2000, there were 23,643 people, 8,433 households, and 6,611 families residing in the town. The population density was 686.7 inhabitants per square mile (265.1/km^{2}). There were 8,877 housing units at an average density of 257.8 per square mile (99.5/km^{2}). The racial makeup of the town was 96.12% White, 0.62% Black or African American, 0.09% Native American, 2.08% Asian, 0.03% Pacific Islander, 0.36% from other races, and 0.70% from two or more races. Hispanic or Latino of any race were 1.97% of the population.

There were 8,433 households, out of which 43.0% had children under the age of 18 living with them, 70.6% were married couples living together, 6.0% had a female householder with no husband present, and 21.6% were non-families. 18.9% of all households were made up of individuals, and 7.5% had someone living alone who was 65 years of age or older. The average household size was 2.78 and the average family size was 3.21.

In the town, the population was spread out, with 30.6% under the age of 18, 3.2% from 18 to 24, 27.8% from 25 to 44, 27.5% from 45 to 64, and 10.9% who were 65 years of age or older. The median age was 39 years. For every 100 females, there were 92.8 males. For every 100 females age 18 and over, there were 89.4 males.

The median income for a household in the town was $107,351, and the median income for a family was $127,981 (these figures had risen to $125,909 and $154,346 respectively as of a 2007 estimate). Males had a median income of $100,000 versus $50,236 for females. The per capita income for the town was $51,795. About 1.3% of families and 2.4% of the population were below the poverty line, 5.3% of those age 65 or over.

As of the census of 2000, there were 7,212 people, 2,933 households, and 1,994 families residing in the CDP. The population density was 1,125.2 inhabitants per square mile (434.4/km^{2}). There were 3,078 housing units at an average density of 480.2 per square mile (185.4/km^{2}). The racial makeup of the CDP was 95.52% White, 0.54% Black or African American, 0.11% Native American, 2.44% Asian, 0.01% Pacific Islander, 0.51% from other races, and 0.86% from two or more races, while 2.26% of the population were Hispanic or Latino of any race.

There were 2,933 households, out of which 34.4% had children under the age of 18 living with them, 57.7% were married couples living together, 8.1% had a female householder with no husband present, and 32.0% were non-families. Of all households, 28.5% were made up of individuals, and 12.3% had someone living alone who was 65 years of age or older. The average household size was 2.46 and the average family size was 3.05.

In the CDP the population was spread out, with 26.9% under the age of 18, 3.3% from 18 to 24, 28.5% from 25 to 44, 27.9% from 45 to 64, and 13.4% who were 65 years of age or older. The median age was 41 years. For every 100 females, there were 89.4 males. For every 100 females age 18 and over, there were 85.5 males.

The median income for a household in the CDP was $81,179, and the median income for a family was $127,327. Males had a median income of $93,084 versus $47,232 for females. The per capita income for the CDP was $46,843. 3.2% of the population and 1.7% of families were below the poverty line. Out of the total population, 1.6% of those under the age of 18 and 6.8% of those 65 and older were living below the poverty line.

== Arts and culture ==
The Western Connecticut Youth Orchestra, formerly called the Ridgefield Symphony Youth Orchestra, has performed at Carnegie Hall and Avery Fisher Hall at the Lincoln Center.

The Ridgefield Symphony Orchestra began as the "Ridgefield Symphonette" in 1965 with 20 players, only a third of them professionals. It became fully professional by the end of the decade and today has 75 musicians and draws soloists of international reputation. In 1984, Maxim Shostakovich, then a Ridgefielder, conducted a sold-out concert of music by his father, Dmitri Shostakovich, with the composer's grandson, Dmitri, performing as piano soloist.

The Keeler Tavern Museum preserves an early 18th-century house that, by the time of the Revolution, had become a tavern and inn. The tavern was a center of community activities, an early post office, and a stop on the northern New York to Boston post road. In the early 20th century, it was the home of noted architect Cass Gilbert. The tavern is open several days a week, offers tours, and has a gift shop.

The Aldrich Contemporary Art Museum is a leading venue for the world's best contemporary artists. Its exhibitions have attracted national attention and respect. The museum was redesigned and expanded in 2004, and offers many special programs, including concerts.

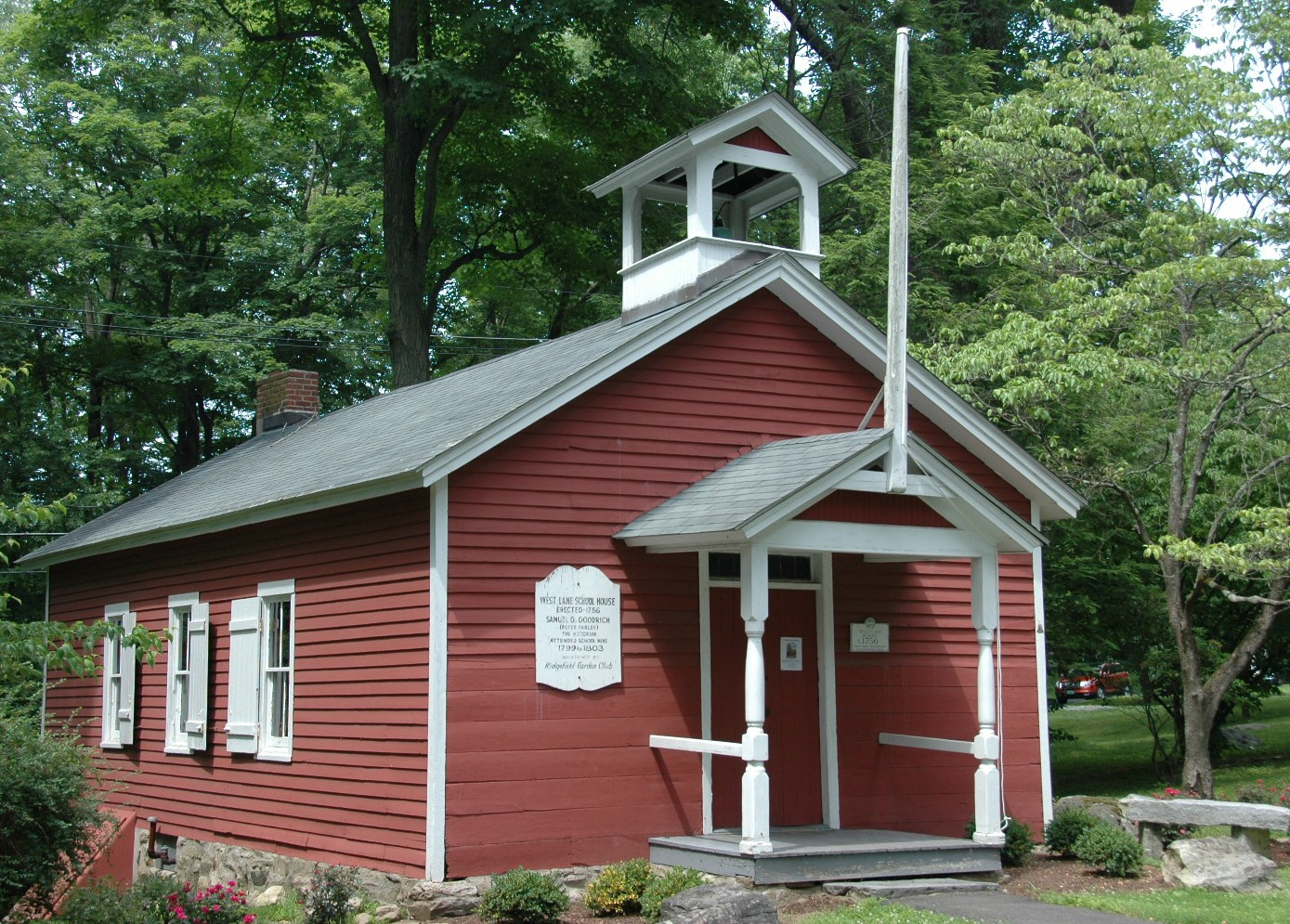
Peter Parley Schoolhouse

The Ridgefield Playhouse, opened in December 2000, is housed in the former Ridgefield Alternate High School auditorium, and was remodeled as a playhouse. It is the year-round venue for dozens of concerts and other performances, many by internationally known artists. The Playhouse also shows movies, many of them first-run.

Weir Farm National Historic Site, which straddles the Ridgefield-Wilton border, preserves much of the farm of J. Alden Weir (1852–1919), a painter of the American Impressionism style. The property was later used by his son-in-law, Mahonri Young (1877–1957), noted sculptor and a grandson of Brigham Young. The site includes the Weir Farm Art Center and a gallery, and many special events take place there, including shows by visiting artists in residence. Weir Farm is one of only two official National Park Service units in the state.

The Ridgefield Conservatory of Dance was founded as the Ridgefield Studio of Classical Ballet in 1965 by Patricia Schuster. In 2002 it became the Ridgefield Conservatory of Dance, a non-profit 501(c)3 organization. The Conservatory is home to three pre-professional performance companies: the Ridgefield Civic Ballet, The Junior Dance Ensemble, and the Contemporary Dance Ensemble. The conservatory presents The Nutcracker annually at the Ridgefield Playhouse.

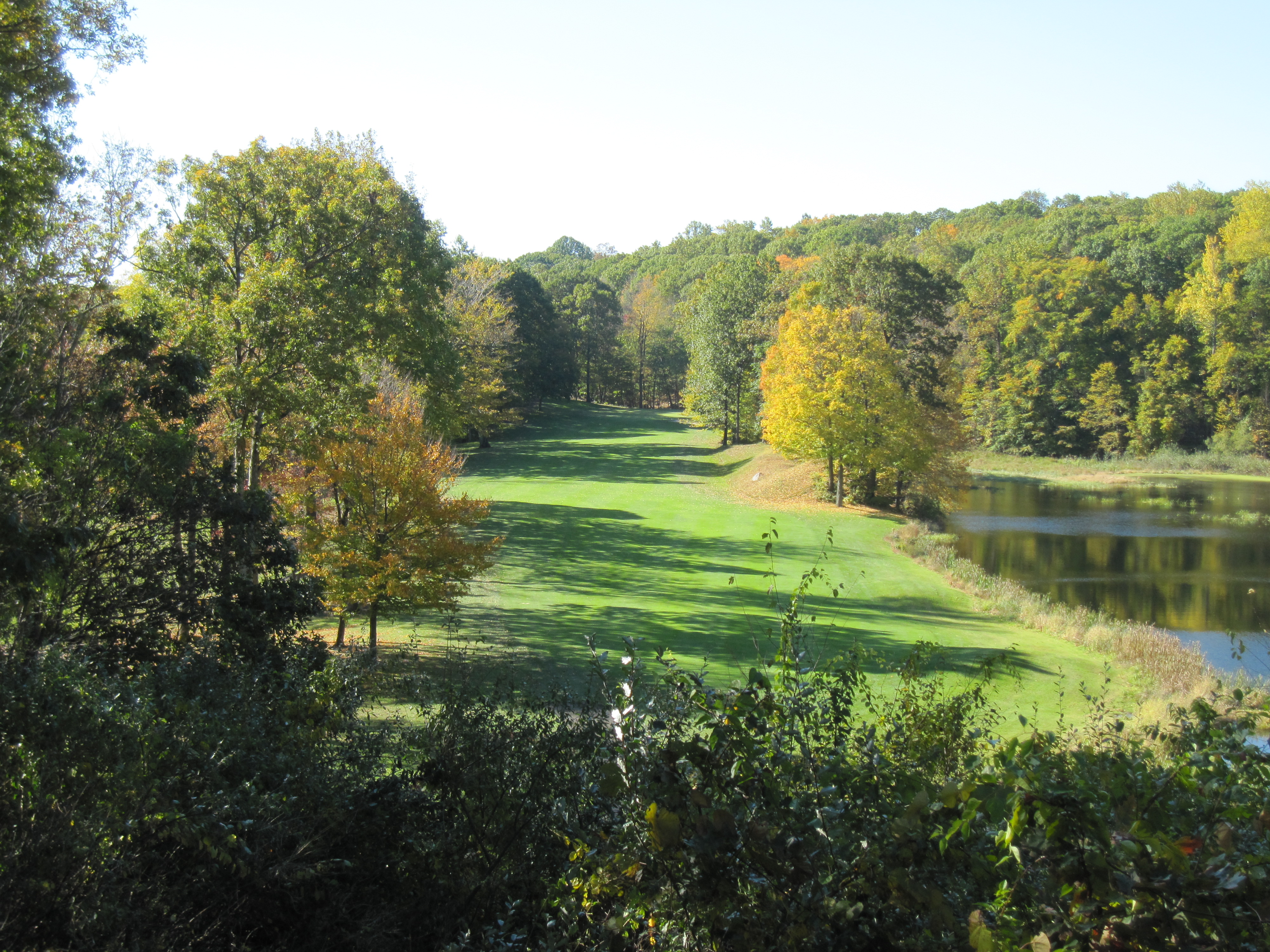
Ridgefield golf course

Thrown Stone Theatre Company is a professional theatre company in town that focuses primarily on new work.

Located at the intersection of West Lane and Route 35, the Peter Parley Schoolhouse (c. 1750), also known as the Little Red Schoolhouse or the West Lane Schoolhouse, is a one-room schoolhouse in use by the town until 1913. The site and grounds are maintained by the Ridgefield Garden Club. The building is open certain Sundays and displays the desks, slates, and books the children used.

Ridgefield's public open space includes Aldrich Park, Bennett's Pond State Park, Brewster Farm, Florida Refuge, Hemlock Hills/Lake Windwing, Pine Mountain, Seth Low Pierrepont State Park, and the Weir Farm National Historic Site. Its public open spaces make up 5,200 acres (2,100 ha), accounting for 23% of the towns overall land.

Ridgefield Golf Course is the town's municipal 18 hole golf course designed by George Fazio and Tom Fazio and opened in 1974.

The town's largest industry is Boehringer Ingelheim Pharmaceuticals, whose United States headquarters are located in the Ridgebury section of town.

In 2006, the Rockefeller Center Christmas Tree selected to be displayed in New York's Rockefeller Center for the Christmas season came from Ridgefield.

The town also features a skatepark, owned by the town and maintained by the town's parks and recreation service, in which both skateboarding and aggressive inline skating are done. In 2010 the skatepark was rebuilt and expanded as a result of the need to expand the Ridgefield Playhouse parking lot.

=== Annual events ===
- The Nutmeg Festival on Main Street is in August. It has been organized by St. Stephen's Church and held on its grounds since 1906, when it was started there as an "apron and cake sale" by the Ladies Guild to raise money for charity. The event has recently been transformed into Nutmeg and Neighbors, a fundraising event.

=== On the National Register of Historic Places ===
Part of the town center is a historic district listed on the National Register of Historic Places (NRHP) as Ridgefield Center Historic District. The district was added to the Register in 1984 and includes representations of mid-19th-century revival, Late Victorian, and Colonial revival architectural styles. Noted architect Cass Gilbert purchased historic Keeler Tavern within the district and renovated it for his use as a summer home. Roughly bounded by Pound Street, Fairview Avenue, Prospect Ridge, and Whipstick Roads, the district was added on October 7, 1984. In addition to the town center historic district, there are a number of individual properties and at least one other historic district in the town that are NRHP-listed:

- Benedict House and Shop: 57 Rockwell Road (added 1998)
- Branchville Railroad Tenement: Old Main Highway (added 1982)
- Frederic Remington House: 154 Barry Avenue (added 1966)
- Hugh Cain Fulling Mill and Elias Glover Woolen Mill Archeological Site (added 1985)
- J. Alden Weir Farm Historic District: 735 Nod Hill Road and Pelham Lane (added 1984; see Weir Farm National Historic Site, below)
- Keeler Tavern: 132 Main Street (added 1982)
- Lewis June House: 478 North Salem Road (added 1984)
- March Route of Rochambeau's Army: Ridgebury Road: Ridgebury Road, from intersection with Old Stagecoach South (added 2003)
- Phineas Chapman Lounsbury House: 316 Main Street, also known as the Ridgefield Veterans Memorial Community Center (added 1975)
- Ridgebury Congregational Church: Ridgebury Road and George Washington Highway (added 1984)
- Thomas Hyatt House: 11 Barlow Mountain Road (added 1984)
- West Mountain Historic District: state road 855 (formerly Route 102) (added 1984)

== Government and politics ==
Ridgefield has a traditional New England Board of Selectmen–Town Meeting form of government, which is created by Town Charter and approved by the voters. The Charter calls for an annual Town and Budget Meeting to be held on the first Monday of May each year. The following are the elective offices of the Town of Ridgefield: Board of Selectpersons, Town Clerk, Town Treasurer and Tax Collector. The following are the elective boards and commissions of the Town of Ridgefield: Board of Education, Planning and Zoning Commission, Board of Appeals on Zoning, Board of Tax Review, Board of Police Commissioners and Board of Finance. The chief executive is The First Selectman, who also serves a legislative function as a member of the Board of Selectmen. The current First Selectperson, Rudy Marconi (D), was first elected in 1999.

Voter registration and party enrollment as of October 31, 2023
Party	Active voters	Inactive voters	Total voters	Percentage
Democratic	6,305	901	7,206	34.54%
Republican	4,722	796	5,518	26.45%
Unaffiliated	6,547	1,269	7,816	37.45%
Minor parties	274	53	327	1.56%
Total	17,848	3,019	20,867	100%

Past elections results

Ridgefield town vote by party in presidential elections
Year	Democratic	Republican	Third Parties
2024	62.70% 9,704	35.67% 5,520	1.63% 251
2020	63.31% 10,278	35.04% 5,689	1.65% 268
2016	55.31% 7,907	39.73% 5,680	4.96% 709
2012	46.30% 6,461	52.74% 7,360	0.96% 134
2008	52.17% 7,480	47.33% 6,786	0.50% 71
2004	46.42% 6,554	52.47% 7,408	1.11% 157
2000	43.50% 5,760	52.13% 6,902	4.37% 578
1996	41.62% 4,974	50.56% 6,042	7.82% 935
1992	35.58% 4,729	46.39% 6,166	18.03% 2,396
1988	33.73% 4,055	65.39% 7,860	0.88% 106
1984	27.29% 3,206	72.47% 8,512	0.24% 28
1980	24.25% 2,591	61.23% 6,542	14.53% 1,552
1976	34.34% 3,451	65.01% 6,533	0.65% 65
1972	29.33% 2,621	69.03% 6,169	1.64% 147
1968	32.73% 2,267	63.38% 4,390	3.90% 270
1964	56.81% 3,085	43.19% 2,345	0.00% 0
1960	33.83% 1,407	66.17% 2,752	0.00% 0
1956	20.81% 656	79.19% 2,496	0.00% 0
1952	25.70% 757	73.96% 2,178	0.34% 10
1948	23.77% 525	73.46% 1,622	2.77% 61
1944	32.43% 652	67.57% 1,358	0.00% 0
1940	31.48% 625	68.52% 1,360	0.00% 0
1936	31.61% 556	68.39% 1,203	0.00% 0
1932	30.46% 450	69.54% 1,027	0.00% 0
1928	26.23% 341	73.47% 955	0.30% 4
1924	18.67% 181	78.64% 762	2.69% 26
1920	19.60% 174	77.81% 691	2.59% 23
1916	39.55% 229	59.58% 345	0.87% 5
1912	43.21% 229	42.45% 225	14.34% 76
1908	31.16% 163	68.46% 358	0.38% 2
1904	33.70% 184	66.30% 362	0.00% 0
1900	31.04% 158	68.96% 351	0.00% 0
1896	18.95% 105	77.08% 427	3.97% 22
1892	41.13% 220	58.31% 312	0.56% 3
1888	37.58% 189	62.23% 313	0.19% 1
1884	39.56% 199	60.44% 304	0.00% 0
1880	40.38% 210	59.62% 310	0.00% 0
1876	44.21% 214	55.79% 270	0.00% 0
1872	50.59% 214	49.41% 209	0.00% 0
1868	46.60% 226	53.40% 259	0.00% 0
1864	41.50% 193	58.50% 272	0.00% 0
1860	7.05% 33	62.18% 291	30.77% 144
1856	39.41% 186	60.59% 286	0.00% 0
1852	43.11% 194	56.89% 256	0.00% 0
1848	38.24% 169	61.09% 270	0.67% 3
1844	41.23% 202	58.77% 288	0.00% 0
1840	36.09% 144	63.91% 255	0.00% 0
1836	61.65% 119	38.35% 74	0.00% 0
1832	9.22% 20	88.48% 192	2.30% 5
1828	8.04% 7	91.96% 80	0.00% 0

== Education ==
Ridgefield has nine public schools and two private schools. The public schools are managed by Ridgefield Public Schools. The six public elementary schools are Veterans Park, Branchville, Farmingville, Scotland, Barlow Mountain, and Ridgebury. Scotts Ridge Middle School (Ridgefield's newest school) and East Ridge are the town's two middle schools. The high school is Ridgefield High School. The high school's teams are called the Ridgefield Tigers.

Ridgefield's Roman Catholic schools are St. Mary, serving preschool through eighth grade, and St. Padre Pio Academy, serving kindergarten through eighth grade and run by the Society of St. Pius X.

Ridgefield Academy is a co-educational, independent school serving preschool through eighth grade, situated on a 42-acre (17 ha) turn-of-the-20th-century estate on West Mountain that was once home to the Congregation de Notre Dame.

There are also various preschools and a Montessori school.

== Infrastructure ==
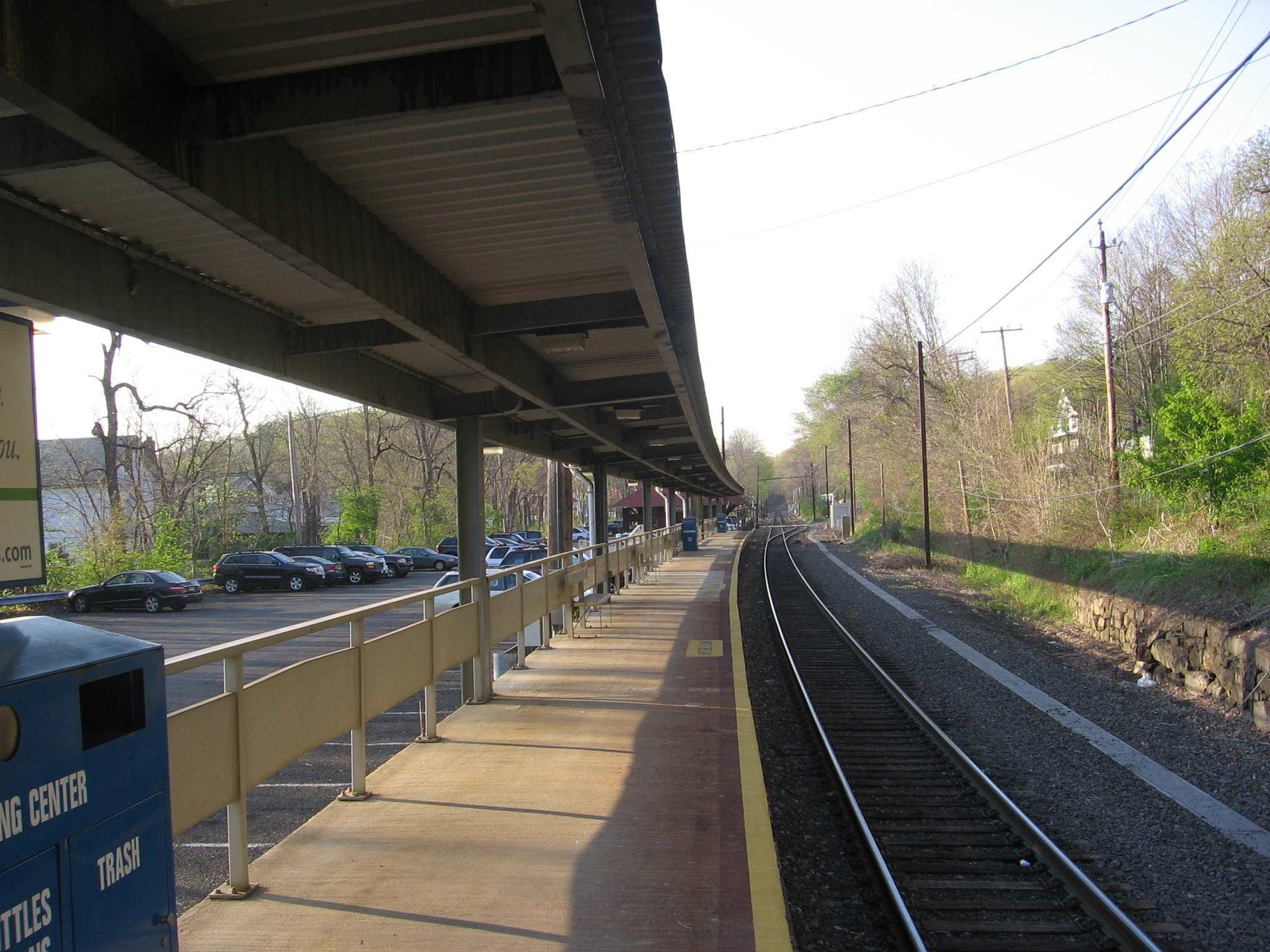
Branchville station is located in the southeast corner of town, in the Branchville neighborhood. The station is part of Metro-North Railroad's Danbury Branch.

- Electricity – Eversource Energy
- Water – Aquarion serves central and west parts of town (down Route 33 South to St. Johns Road, north along Route 35 to Farmingville, west to the Eleven Levels area and West Lane). Small water companies serve some other parts of town. The water line was recently extended up North Street to Barlow Mountain and Scotland Elementary Schools, a proposal that took years to pass.
- Telephone/internet – Frontier Communications
- Cable television/telephone/internet – Comcast Cable in Danbury
- Local newspaper – The Ridgefield Press
- Public transportation by train – the Metro-North Railroad's Danbury Branch, which is a part of the New Haven Line, serves Branchville station, a commuter rail stop. Northbound diesel trains will travel to Danbury station, and southbound trains will travel to South Norwalk station. During peak hours on weekdays, some trains will travel as far as Stamford Transportation Center, and express trains to Grand Central Terminal.
- Public transportation by bus – Housatonic Area Regional Transit (HART), the bus system serving Greater Danbury. HART operates a weekday commuter shuttle between Katonah station and the park and ride lots at 207 Main Street and 58 Prospect Ridge.

== Neighborhoods ==
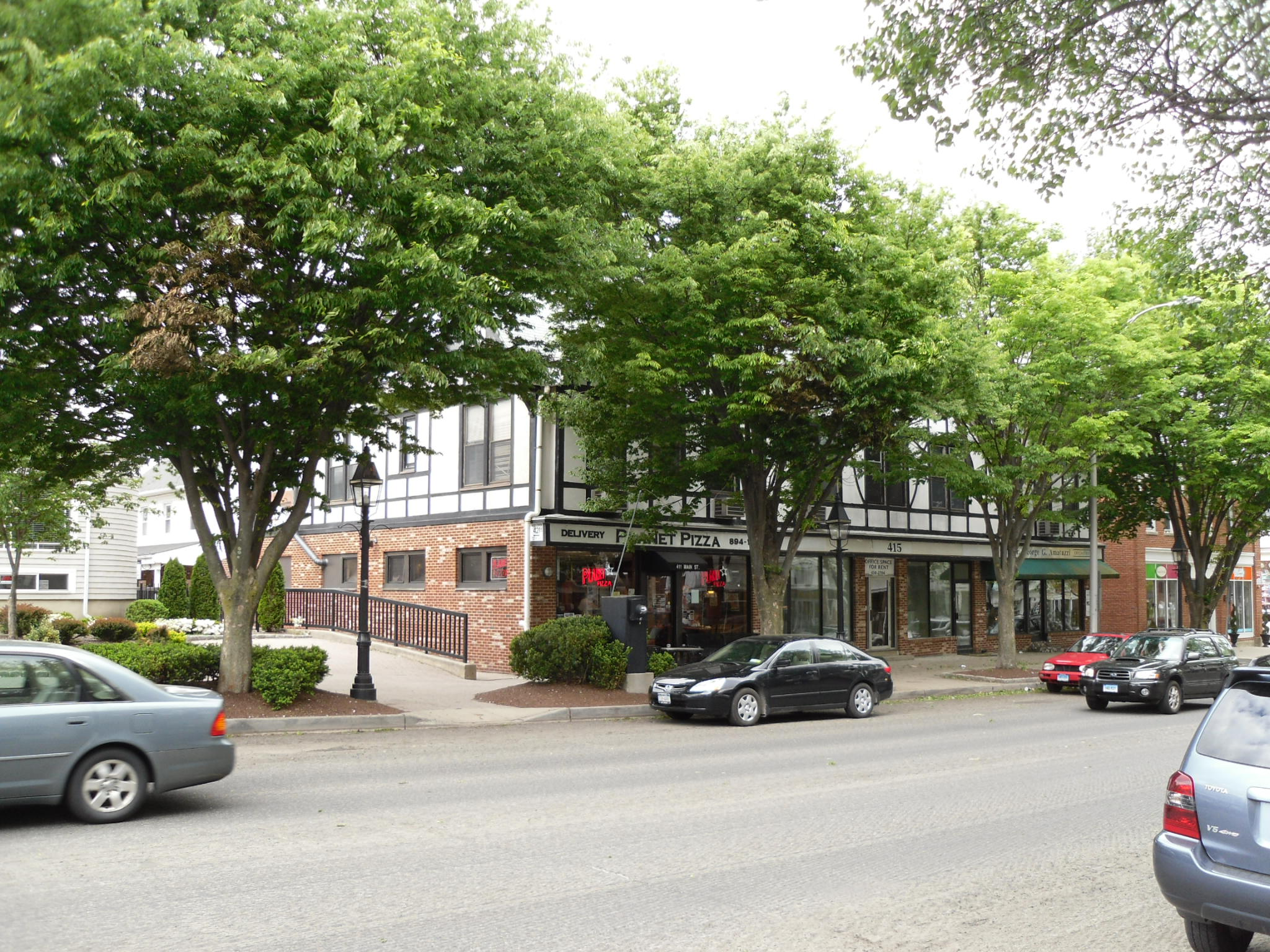
Main Street in Downtown, c. 2010

Ridgefield is predominantly made up of 19 encompassing neighborhoods. Ridgefield, Main Street, Branchville, Titicus, Farmingville, Ridgebury, Topstone, West Mountain, Cooper Hill, Ramapoo, Route 7, Georgetown, Deer Run, Peaceable Hill, Quail Ride, Westmoreland, Twixt Hills, Long Ridge, and Starrs/Picketts Ridge. It also contains the census-designated places Lakes East and Lakes West.
