= Spero Anargyros =

American sculptor (1915–2004)

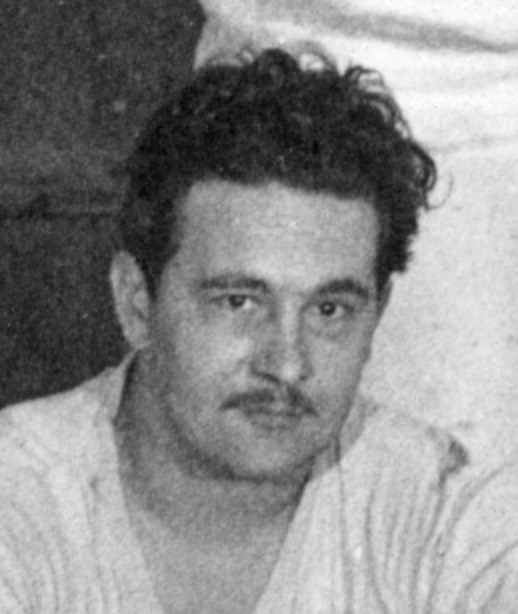
- Spero Anargyros
- Born: Spero Drosos Anargyros; January 23, 1915; New York City, New York, U.S.
- Died: September 10, 2004 (aged 89); San Mateo, California, U.S.
- Education: Art Students League of New York
- Occupations: Sculptor, medalist
- Spouse(s): Florence “Nedra” Harrison (m. 1940– 1969; div.); Barbara Brooks (div.); Maria Ester Mendez Dequiroga (m. 1982–2004; his death)

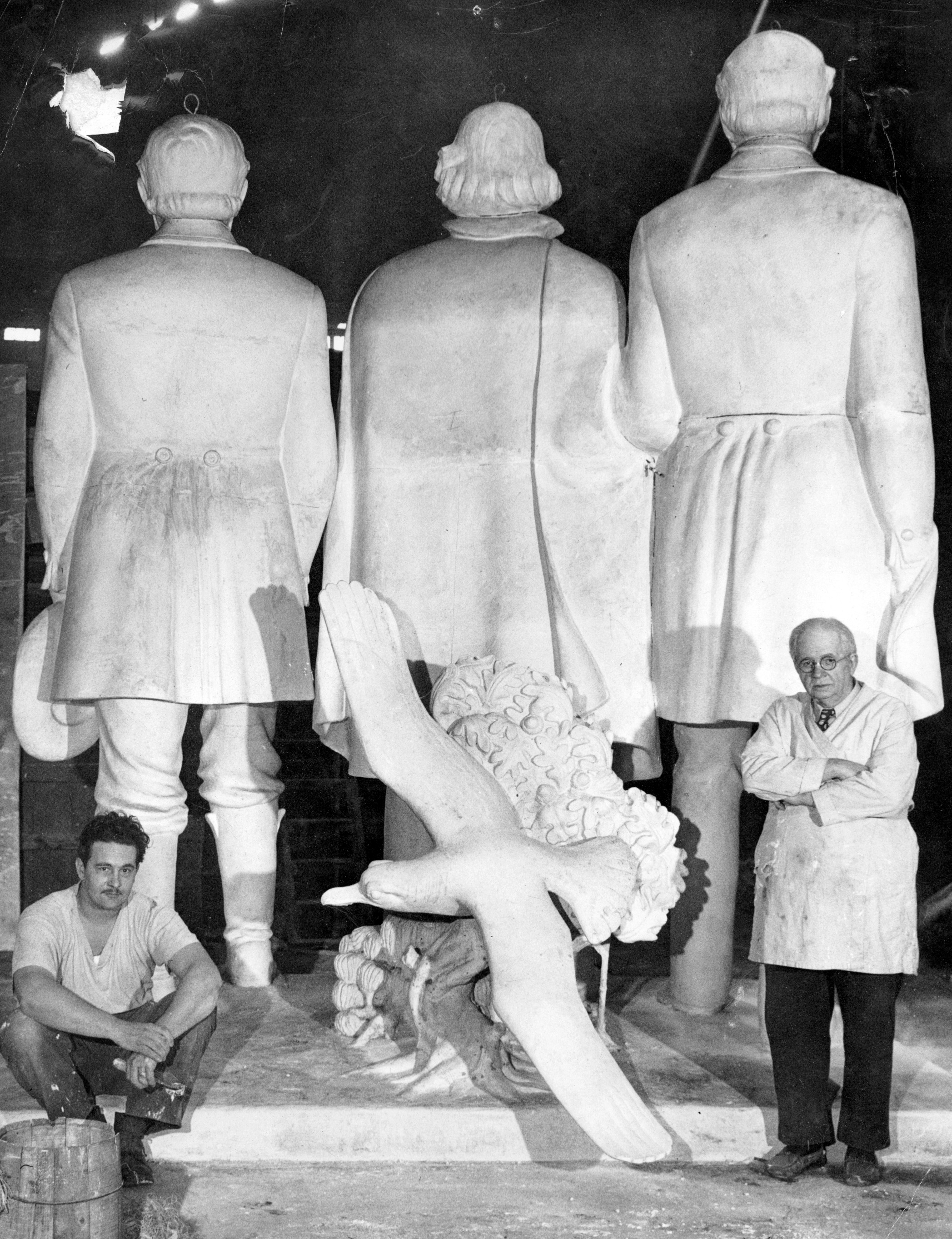
Spero Anargyros (left) and Mahonri Young (right), at Weir Farm National Historical Park

Spero Drosos Anargyros (January 23, 1915 – September 10, 2004) was an American sculptor and medalist, active in the San Francisco Bay Area. He was known for his large scale memorials and public art sculptures, as well as small medals.

== Early life and education ==
Spero Anargyros was born on January 23, 1915, in New York City, to parents to Martha and Drosos Anargyros. He was the son of a Greek immigrant. He studied in 1934 to 1935 at the Art Students League of New York, under William Zorach. He continued his studied with Louis Slobodkin.

== Career ==
In his early career Anargyros secured a federal commission through the Works Progress Administration (WPA) to complete a bas relief for a New Jersey post office. In 1940, he was employed by the Manhattan Wax and Candle Company. During World War II, Anargyros was stationed in northern Africa in an ambulance unit.

Anargyros worked as the chief assistant under Mahonri Young from 1944 to 1947, on the This is the Place Monument. They worked at the Weir Farm National Historical Park for the duration of the project and Anargyros lived in Branchville, Connecticut. In 1947, Anagyros moved to Los Angeles, where he focused on portraits of celebrities; and shortly thereafter moved to San Francisco.

The Palace of Fine Arts in San Francisco structure was originally designed by architect Bernard Maybeck, with decorative sculptures by Ulric Ellerhusen; built for the 1915 Panama–Pacific International Exposition (PPIE) as a temporary structure. It was completely rebuilt in the 1960s and 1970s. Anargyros worked in the 1960s on the recreation of the 52 weeping lady outdoor sculptures standing at 15 feet (4.6 m) tall for the Palace of Fine Arts. He also modeled other figures for the Palace of Fine Arts, including 22 feet (6.7 m) tall centaurs, and angels.

Some of Anargyros sculpted portraits included Kirk Douglas, George Moscone, Vic Bergeron of Trader Vic's, Edward Daly, Haile Selassie, and Nelson Mandela.

Anargyros died following an illness at the age of 89 on September 10, 2004, in a hospital in San Mateo, California.

== Personal life ==
Anargyros was married three times. His first marriage was to Florence “Nedra” Harrison (1915–2004), from 1940 until 1969, and ended in divorce. Anargyros was married to Barbara Brooks for seven years in the 1970s. His final marriage was to Maria Ester Mendez Dequiroga in 1982, together they lived in San Bruno, California and the marriage ended in his death in 2004.

== List of works ==
- This Is the Place Monument (1947), Salt Lake City, Utah; as chief assistant
- First Westerners (1957), bronze bas-relief, First Western Bank and Trust Company (now Lloyds Bank California), San Francisco, California
- Seal of San Francisco (1960) white sierra granite, Hall of Justice, 850 Bryant Street, San Francisco, California
- Jesus on the Cross (1973), 12' bronze, private Martinez family mausoleum, Guam
- Pedro Camacho Lujan Memorial (1975) 7' bronze with 6' concrete base, P. C. Lujan Elementary School (formerly known as East Barrigada Elementary School), Barrigada, Guam
- Indian Being Attacked by a Bear (1982) cast stone, California State Capitol, Sacramento, California; replica of Pietro Mezzara's 1873 work
- Woman Being Attacked by a Buffalo (1982) cast stone, California State Capitol, Sacramento, California; replica of Pietro Mezzara's 1873 work
- Gen. John A. Sutter (1987), bronze with stone base, Sutter General Hospital, 1115 28th Street, Sacramento, California
- Memorial to Byron Pierson Jensen (1988), bronze raccoon, San Bruno Mountain, Brisbane, California; stolen in 2007
- Hills Brothers Coffee Drinker (1992), 9' tall polychromed bronze, The Embarcadero, 2 Harrison Street, San Francisco, California; NRHP-listed
- Bust of Mayor George Moscone (1994), bronze, San Francisco City Hall, 1 Dr Carlton B Goodlett Place, San Francisco, California
- Bust of Mayor George Moscone (1994), bronze, Moscone Center, Third Street Entrance to Moscone South, San Francisco, California
- Bronze Bust of Mahonri Mackintosh Young, bronze, Weir Farm National Historical Park, Connecticut

== See also ==
- Robert Arneson (1930–1992), sculptor
