= Garafola =

Garafola is a surname. Notable people with the surname include:

- Eddie Garafola (1938–2020), American mobster
- Lynn Garafola (born 1946), American dance historian, linguist, critic, curator, lecturer, and educator
- Ralph Garafola (1929–2019), American artist, literary critic, educator of fine arts, and author

== See also ==
- Bradford Allen Garafola, murder victim; see 2016 shooting of Baton Rouge police officers#Victims
- Garofalo, surname
