= The Ultimate Weapon (novel) =

1936 novel by John W. Campbell

- First edition
- Author: John W. Campbell
- Cover artist: Gerald McConnell
- Language: English
- Genre: Science fiction
- Published: 1936
- Publication place: United States

The Ultimate Weapon is a 1936 science fiction novel by American writer John W. Campbell initially published under the title of Uncertainty as a series in Amazing Stories in October and December editions in 1936.

== Plot ==
Alien invaders escape their doomed home-planet of Mira and bring their starship fleet to conquer Earth. Nothing stands in the way of the Miran invaders, except Buck Kendall, who has discovered the ultimate weapon that is Earth's last hope.
