= Frank J. Reilly =

American painter

Frank Joseph Reilly (1906–1967) was an American painter, illustrator, muralist, and teacher. He taught drawing and painting at the Grand Central School of Art, and illustration at Pratt Institute and Moore College of Art. However, he is best known for his twenty-eight years of instructing at the Art Students League of New York and establishing the Frank J. Reilly School of Art in the early 1960s, where he taught until his death in 1967.

== Background ==
The son of a Broadway stage manager, Frank Joseph Reilly was born August 21, 1906, in New York City. He studied at the Art Students League of New York from 1927 through 1931. Frank was admitted as a student into George Bridgman's drawing class. It was required that prospective students take an entry test. "I had boned up for this important event by studying art pose number one, the front view, using Mr. Bridgman's book as a source of information". Reilly served as his class monitor from 1927. Reilly began lecturing at the League in 1933, and upon Bridgman's death in 1943 took over the figure drawing class. His painting instructor at the League was Frank Vincent Dumond.

He also taught at the Grand Central School of Art from 1934 to 1937, and at Moore College of Art and Design, and Pratt Institute from 1951 to 1953.

Reilly served as an apprentice to famed illustrator Dean Cornwell, his friend and neighbor, and assisted him on several murals, including the Los Angeles Library Murals and one in the Raleigh Room of the Warwick Hotel in New York City. He held the positions of Art Commissioner of New York City, President of the Council of American Artists Societies, Vice President of the National Society of Mural Painters, and Vice President of the Art Students League.

His illustration clients included Continental Distilling Corporation, the Pennsylvania Railroad and Philadelphia Whiskey. In 1947 he completed a series of twelve historical painting for the Continental Distilling Corporation that were released as lithographs and print ads. Reilly created murals for the Bronx High School of Science and the Johnson City Courthouse in Tennessee. He taught mural painting at the National Academy of Design.

== Influences ==
Frank Reilly's teaching heritage is linked to the French academy of the 19th century. His drawing instructor, George Bridgman, had studied with Jean-Léon Gérôme, a student of Paul Delaroche. Bridgeman also studied with Gustave Boulanger.

His painting instructor Frank Vincent DuMond attended the Académie Julian, where he studied under artists Gustave Boulanger and Jules-Joseph Lefebvre. Dumond also studied with Jean-Joseph Benjamin-Constant, who had been a student of Alexandre Cabanel.

Reilly was further influenced by American illustrator Dean Cornwell. Cornwell had studied with Frank Brangwyn and Harvey Dunn. Dunn had been a student of Howard Pyle.

== Teaching ==
Reilly developed a figure drawing method that began with six basic structural lines, a framework upon which the figure could be constructed. He is especially noted for developing a means of organizing the palette, based partially on the work of 19th-century colorist Albert H. Munsell. Following Munsell's view of separating color into hue, value and chroma, Reilly organized the figure-painting palette in this manner, creating nine values of neutral grey as a control, with corresponding values of red, orange and fleshtone. A value based palette was also developed for landscape painting. A portion of Reilly's landscape program was based on the teachings of John F. Carlson. His classes at the Art Students League and the corresponding landscape classes held in Woodstock, NY were consistently full and students on the wait list numbered in the hundreds. In the early 1960s he left the League to establish the Frank J. Reilly School of Art in the nearby Steinway Hall Building at 111 West 57th Street. "He taught drawing and painting, values and color, for 28 years, at the Art Students' League of New York....His classrooms were always jammed to the doors; it is said that, in all he had more pupils than any art teacher in history". Memorial tribute by Henderson Wolfe.

== Legacy ==
Many of Reilly's students went on to forge professional art careers. Richard A Botto, Gerald Allison, Michael Aviano, James Bama, Raphael Eisenberg, Basil Gogos, Jack Faragasso, Fred Fixler, Gordon Johnson, Carl Hantman, Doug Higgins, Clark Hulings, Ronnie Lesser, Frank Liljegren, Peter Max, Gerald McConnell, George Passantino, Charles Reid, Leonard Starr, Ralph Garafola, Donald Martinetti and Robert Emil Schulz are among them. Reilly's teaching influence continued through his former students with instructors Michael Aviano and Jack Faragasso as well as their students John Ennis, Jon deMartin, Graydon Parrish, Neilson Carlin and many more.

- Art Students League NEWS, Volume 27, Number 7, October, 1974.
- Steine, Kent. "Frank Reilly:Revolutionary Teacher" Step-by-Step Graphics, May–June 2001, p. 93–103.
- Silverstein, Bonnie. "Frank J. Reilly: The Man and His Method" American Artist Magazine, March 1979. p. 42–49.
- Faragaso, Jack. "The Legacy of Frank J. Reilly". Linea, Summer 2006.
- Garafola, Ralph. "Frank J. Reilly The Elements of Painting". November 2015.
