= Doris Bass Andrews =

American historic preservationist (1920–2003)

Doris Bass Andrews (1920–2003) was an American artist and historic preservationist known for her efforts to protect Weir Farm in Connecticut, an important site for American Impressionism.

== Early life and education ==
Andrews was born in Louisville, Kentucky, in 1920. She attended the Erskine School in Boston and served as a Morse code telegraph operator during World War II. Post-war, she pursued art education at the Art Students League in Manhattan.

== Career ==
Andrews married Sperry Andrews, a fellow artist, in 1947. The couple became prominent watercolor painters and collaborated artistically while advocating for historic preservation.

In the late 1950s, Andrews and Sperry purchased the Weir Farm, historically associated with the Impressionist painter J. Alden Weir. Recognizing the farm's cultural and historical significance, they spearheaded efforts to prevent its commercial development. Their campaign culminated in the establishment of Weir Farm as a National Historic Site in 1990.

=== Legacy ===
Andrews' dedication to preserving Weir Farm helped maintain a vibrant artistic community and protect a landmark of American art history. She received the Connecticut Nature Conservancy's White Oak Award in 1977 for her conservation efforts at the Weir Farm. She died in 2003 in Danbury, Connecticut.
