= Old-fashioned (short story) =

Short story by Isaac Asimov

- Short story by Isaac Asimov
- Astro Minor from "Old Fashion."
- Country: United States
- Language: English
- Genre: Science fiction

Publication
- Published in: Bell Telephone Magazine
- Publisher: American Telephone and Telegraph Company
- Media type: Magazine
- Publication date: February 1976

"Old-fashioned" is a science fiction short story by American writer Isaac Asimov. The story was written at the request of Kim Armstrong, editor of Bell Telephone Magazine, with the stipulation that it be 3,000 words and center on a problem in communications. The author claimed that he had thought up a plot line before lunch with the editor was over. The story was duly written and published in February 1976. It was illustrated by Gerald McConnell in comic book style.

== Plot summary ==
Two astro-miners in the asteroid belt, Estes and Funarelli, are badly injured when their spaceship is damaged by the tidal effects of an uncharted black hole. Their drive and communications systems are beyond repair and they have a finite supply of food and air.

In desperation, Estes hits on the idea of going outside the ship and throwing small rocks at the black hole. This will generate bursts of x-rays which, he hopes, will be detected by radio-astronomers on Earth.

He does this several times, attempting to time the bursts so that they spell out S-O-S in Morse code. The attempt works and within days, an unmanned drone ship with supplies arrives from Earth.
