= Branchville, Connecticut =

Census-designated place in Connecticut, United States

Coordinates: 41°16′03″N 73°26′30″W

- Census-designated place
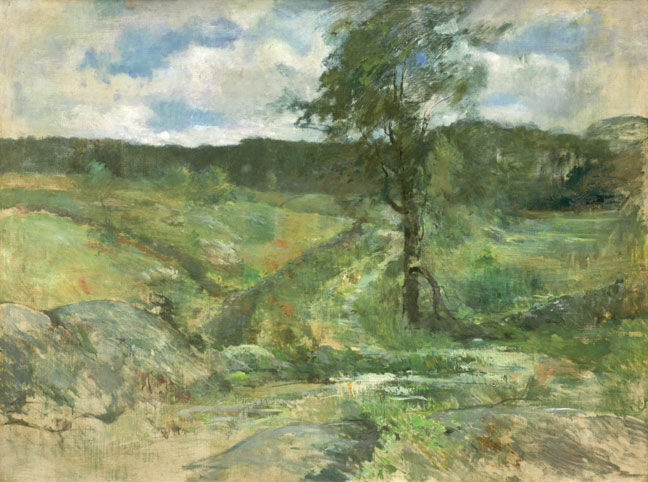
- Branchville (ca. 1888-1889) by John Henry Twachtman (1853-1902)
- Interactive map of Branchville, Connecticut
- Country: United States
- State: Connecticut
- County: Fairfield
- City: Ridgefield
- Time zone: UTC-5:00 (Eastern)
  - Summer (DST): UTC-4:00 (Eastern)
- Area code: 203

Branchville is a neighborhood of the town of Ridgefield in Fairfield County, Connecticut, United States, and is also the name of a Metro North railroad station (Branchville station). As of the 2020 census, Branchville had a population of 262. Branchville was listed as a census-designated place (CDP) prior to the 2020 census.

Some people consider Branchville a part of Georgetown, an adjoining, non-incorporated community at the intersection of Redding, Ridgefield, Wilton and Weston, noting many residences and businesses there share Georgetown's 544- telephone number exchange. Others disagree, pointing to a community vote in the 1950s not to be served by the Georgetown Post Office, which is closer than the Ridgefield Post Office. The Branchville CDP is only in the town of Ridgefield.

== History ==
Branchville was named for the Danbury and Norwalk Railroad's “branch” line extending west to Ridgefield village, a four-mile (6.4 km) run on a long incline [Branchville's elevation is 342 feet (104 m) while the old village station was about 900 feet (270 m) above sea level].

Native Americans had previously referred to the southeast corner of present-day Ridgefield as Wheer Cock. Later it was called Copps Corner, after the Norwalk man who surveyed the town in the early 18th century and was the first town clerk. When workers completed in 1852 the railroad line from Norwalk to Danbury, the neighborhood was at first called Beers Station or Ridgefield Station, after the stop there.

The first recorded use of the term Branchville appears in an 1870 deed for 4 acres (16,000 m^{2}) “lying in the town of Ridgefield at Branchville.” It was the same year that the branch line was built, suggesting that the railroad rather than neighborhood residents had invented the name to distinguish the station from the new one at Ridgefield center. Previously, the station at Branchville had been known as Ridgefield Station or Beers Station.

An 1893 atlas labels this territory as “Plattsville,” possibly a mapmaker's error.

While the area had been mostly farmland and a mill or two, the coming of the railroad sparked the development of a booming, albeit small-scale, industrial community. It included mills, stores, a hotel, a machinery factory, and a post office.

In 1876, after A.N. Fillow began extracting mica at Branchville, two Yale University mineralogists noted the presence of previously undiscovered minerals lodged in pegmatite there and furnished funds to expand the operation. Historians say the mine produced between seven and nine minerals until then unknown. Over time, the mine would produce quantities of quartz, feldspar, mica, beryl, spodumene and columbite.

Passenger service on the Ridgefield branch line continued until 1925; freight service lasted until 1964. Most of the track bed, complete with gravel but missing its rails, is today the path of the Eversource Energy high-voltage line and the town's “Rail-Trail,” developed in the 1990s for walkers. Some of the other sections along southern Florida Road have been sold to adjoining landowners.

== Education ==
Branchville had its own school district at least since the middle 18th century – it was known as the “Ridgefield Station District” before it was called Branchville. Its schoolhouse was used until around fall of 1937 when children started being bused to Garden School on Bailey Avenue in the village.

A new Branchville School opened in 1969 on lower Florida Road, remaining in use until in 1983 when it was closed due to declining enrollments and used as Ridgefield Board of Education offices. In 1994, faced with increasing enrollments, voters agreed to reopen the school.

== Weir Farm ==
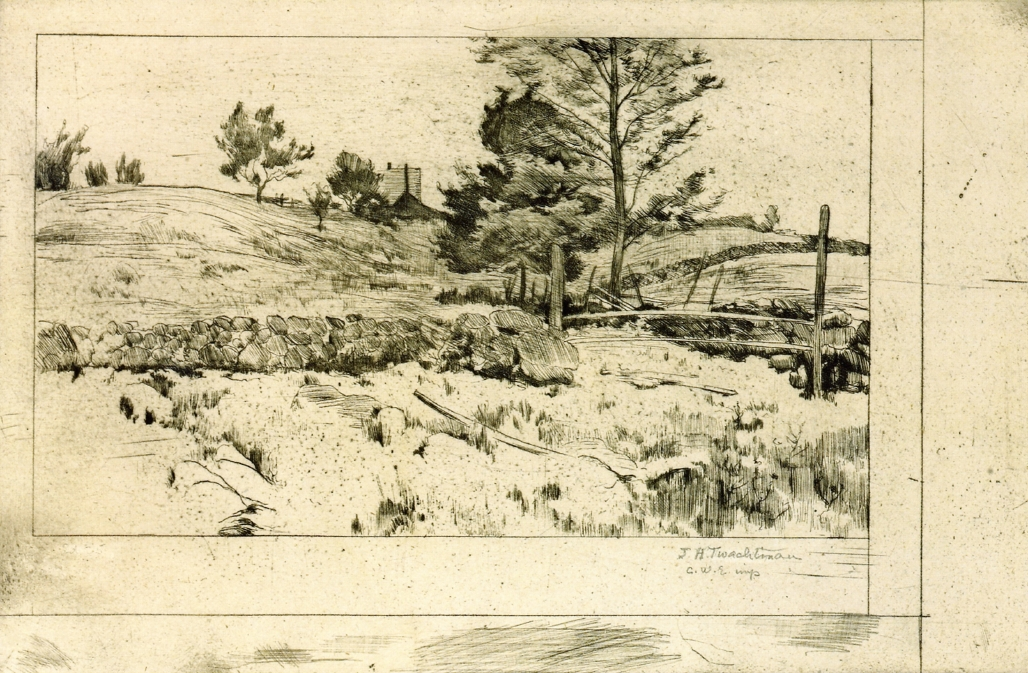
Branchville Fields by John Henry Twachtman, ca. 1888

Weir Farm National Historic Site in Ridgefield and Wilton is considered part of Branchville. Administered by the National Park Service, Weir Farm commemorates the life and work of impressionist painter Julian Alden Weir and other artists who stayed at the site, with notable visitors having included Childe Hassam, Albert Pinkham Ryder, John Singer Sargent and John Twachtman. Artist Sperry Andrews would later lead efforts to preserve the Weir Farm site, with the U.S. government designating it a National Historic Site in 1990.

In 1882, Weir acquired a 153-acre farm from Erwin Davis in exchange for $10 and a painting. Weir and artists he hosted subsequently produced a large number of paintings depicting Branchville and surrounding landscapes.

Weir Farm is slated to represent Connecticut on a commemorative quarter to be issued in 2020 by the U.S. Mint.
