= World Airways =

Charter airline of the United States (1948–2014)

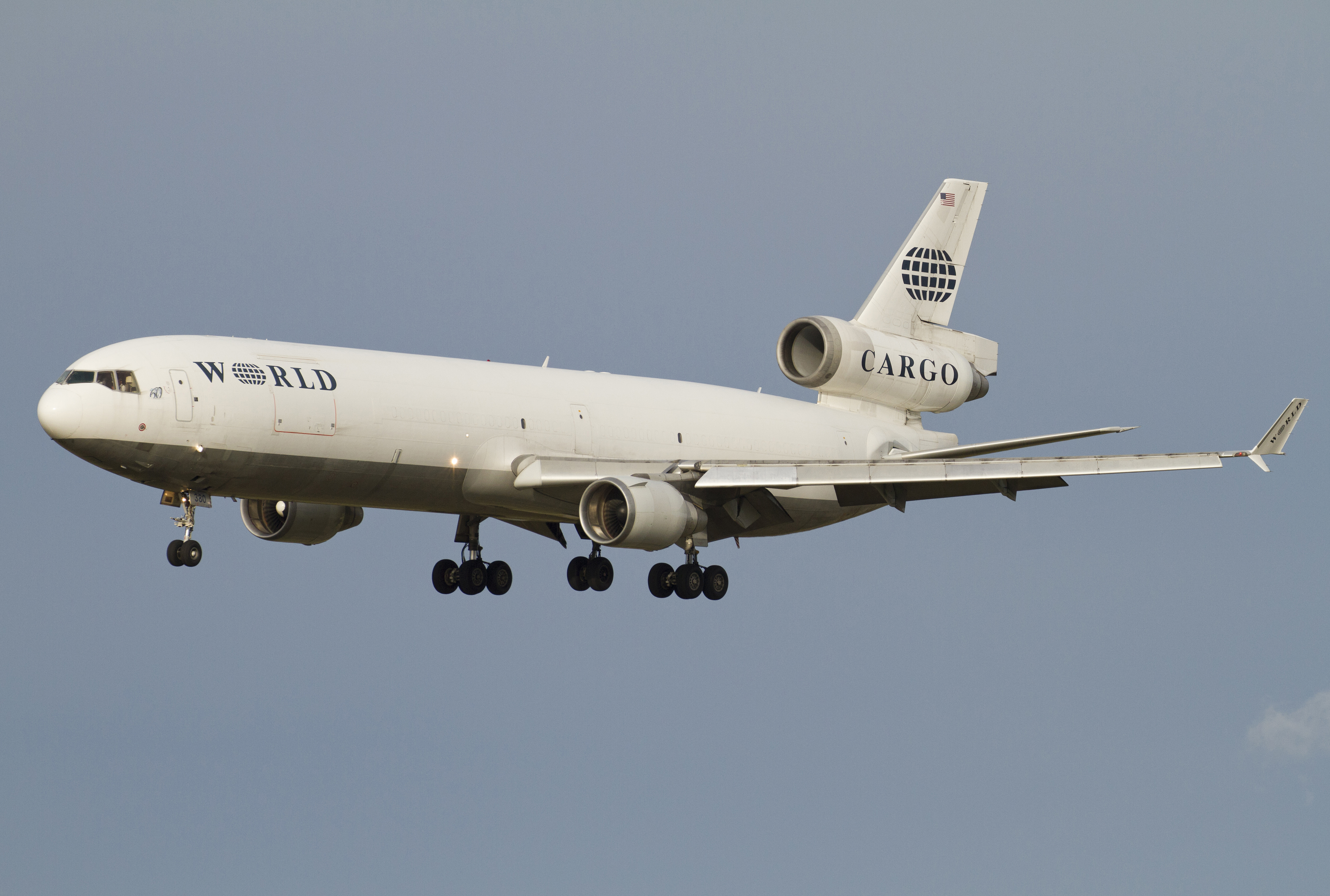
- World Cargo MD-11F arriving at Stockholm Arlanda Airport.
IATA	ICAO	Call sign
WO	WOA	WORLD
- Founded: March 29, 1948
- Ceased operations: March 27, 2014
- Parent company: Global Aviation Holdings
- Headquarters: Peachtree City, Georgia, U.S. (2001–2014); Fairfax County, Virginia, U.S. (1987–2001); Oakland, California, U.S. (1956–1987); Greater Atlanta (1948–1956)
- Key people: John Graber (CEO)

World Airways, Inc. was an American airline headquartered in Peachtree City, Georgia in Greater Atlanta. During the regulated era that ended after 1978, World was a supplemental air carrier. After the US airline deregulation in 1979, the company operated mostly non-scheduled services but did fly scheduled passenger services as well, notably with McDonnell Douglas DC-10 wide body jetliners. World Airways ceased all operations on March 27, 2014.

== History ==
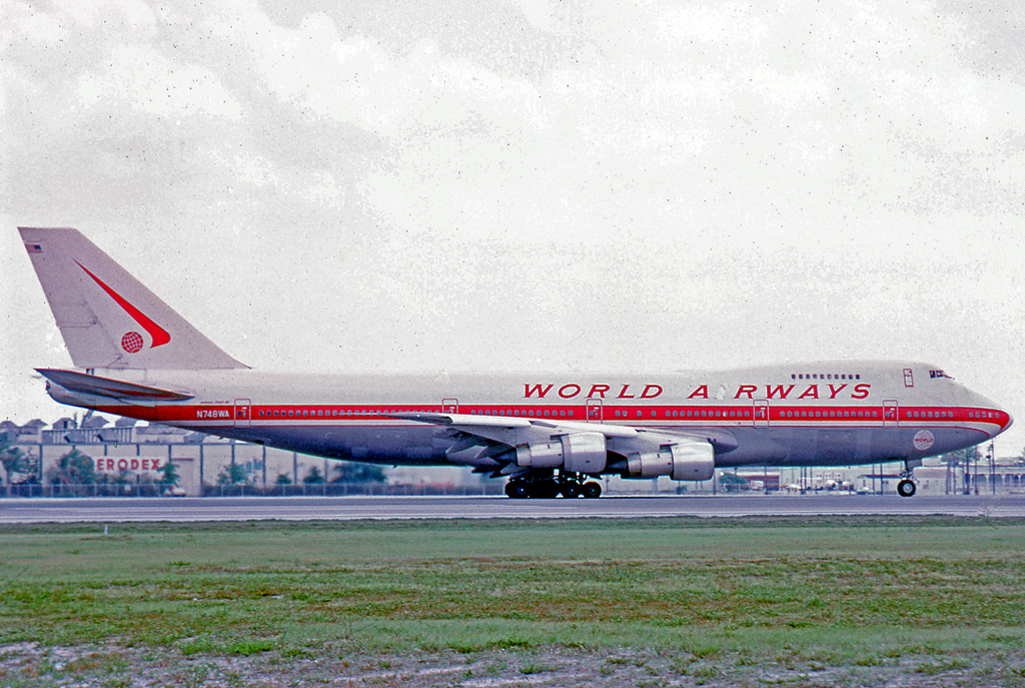
A Boeing 747-273C of World Airways at Miami International Airport in 1974 wearing the early red color scheme.

World Airways was founded on March 29, 1948 by Benjamin Pepper, a Boeing B314 flying boat pilot for Pan American World Airways, using three ex-Pan Am Boeing 314 flying boats (produced from 1938 to 1941). World Airways was sold to Beroviche Steamship Company and a Curtiss C-46 was added. Edward Daly bought the airline in 1950 for $50,000 and proceeded to acquire Douglas DC-4s. In 1951, it received its first government contract. In 1956, it received a contract to fly trans-Atlantic refugee flights, and had a substantial amount of government business throughout the rest of its operational history.

World Airways started as a charter carrier, termed by the Civil Aeronautics Board, prior to 1955, an "irregular air carrier", later a supplemental air carrier. The CAB was the US government agency that tightly regulated the US airline industry until 1978. World was barred by the CAB from offering scheduled service. After US airline deregulation in 1979, World gained the right to fly scheduled flights, and did so for a time.

Later, World acquired Douglas DC-6s and Lockheed Constellations. World entered the jet era in the late 1960s with Boeing 707s and Boeing 727s. In the early 1970s, World acquired Douglas DC-8s.

World became a key military contractor during the Vietnam War, flying troops and equipment between the war zone and World's base at Oakland International Airport. On March 29, 1975, World operated the last airlift flight out of Đà Nẵng, Vietnam. Two 727s were flown to Đà Nẵng, one of which had Ed Daly aboard. Thousands rushed the airplane and it took off on a taxiway under heavy fire. The aircraft with Daly aboard started its takeoff roll with the 727's back airstairs still down with Daly fending off additional people trying to leave due to over capacity (The film of this was later broadcast on the CBS Evening News on March 30, 1975). When the airplane landed at Saigon, there were 268 people in the cabin and possibly 60 or more in the cargo holds. World did not return to Đà Nẵng until April 17, 2002, then with an MD-11 aircraft to pick up a team of people resolving Missing-In-Action cases from the Vietnam War.

In the early 1970s through the early 1980s, World operated three Boeing 747 aircraft and was the launch customer for the "flip nose" front-loading variant of the 747. Later, World acquired DC-10s that were eventually retired in 2010.

In 1986 slots for lucrative routes on the east coast became available, and with the competitive nature for these routes, they were offered to interested airlines in the form of a lottery, or what was called the “Slottery”. World was awarded three city pairs: Boston, Washington National, and New York LaGuardia. In order to acquire these slots, the routes had to be operated for at least three months. World's intention was to sell the routes for a profit to another airline rather than establishing their own operation on these routes, so the company operated fully crewed Boeing 727s (flight deck and cabin crew) without passengers, flying between the scheduled city pairs with touch and go landings and takeoffs. As planned, the routes were then sold for profit. World experienced heavy losses in the 1980s as a result of operating scheduled passenger services, ending scheduled service September 15, 1986. In 1987, the company moved its headquarters from Oakland to Washington Dulles International Airport, acquired Key Airlines from Bain Capital's Presidential Airways, and established ties to Malaysia Airlines. World was burdened financially as its cash was siphoned off by parent WorldCorp to support a telecommunications venture in which the parent had invested. During the first Persian Gulf War, World did a substantial amount of profitable business for the military, enabling the addition of the MD-11 to the fleet. During the mid-1990s, World operated the military passenger trunk route from Osan Air Base, South Korea and Kadena Air Base, Okinawa to Los Angeles, using MD-11 aircraft. World has been headquartered near Atlanta Hartsfield International Airport.

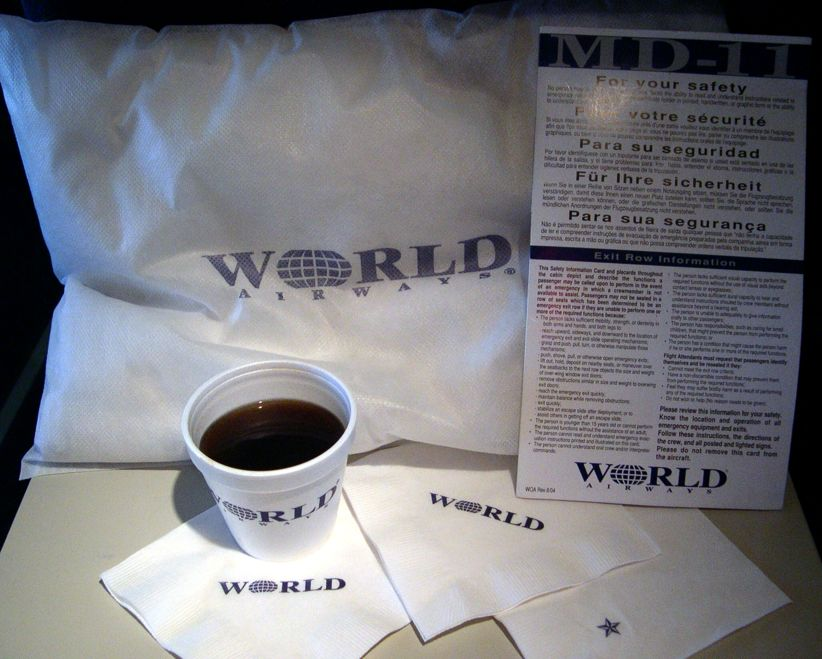
World Airways passenger amenities

The airline received a substantial amount of its business from the military, especially in its role connecting American bases in the U.S. to the Middle East. It also thrived on passenger and freight contracts with private organizations, such as the Jacksonville Jaguars of the National Football League, as well as wet leases to other airlines. With such wet lease arrangements, World Airways essentially functioned as a cargo airline arm of another airline for whom a separate division would not be an efficient use of resources.

In 2006, World Airways became a subsidiary of World Air Holdings, Inc. On April 5, 2007, World Airways returned to its Oakland and the San Francisco Bay Area roots where they were headquartered from 1956 to 1987. It was later acquired by ATA Holdings, which was renamed Global Aero Logistics, in a transaction valued at $315 million. With this, ATA's president, Subodh Karnik became the head of all three certificated airlines autonomous operations, ATA Airlines, North American Airlines, and World Airways. In 2007 GAL moved its operation to the World Airways building in Peachtree City, Georgia. Robert Binns was named chief executive officer of GAL in April 2008 and Charlie McDonald was named president. Larry Montford became COO of World Airways.

On March 27, 2014, World Airways announced the immediate cessation of all operations after its parent company filed for Chapter 11 bankruptcy in 2012 and 2013. At the time of its closure, World's fleet consisted of MD-11 trijet aircraft both in freighter and passenger configurations and of 747-400 freighters.

On November 8, 2017, investment firm 777 Partners, announced it had acquired the intellectual property of World Airways, Inc. and planned to relaunch the airline as a low-cost international carrier with a fleet of Boeing 787 Dreamliners. The new airline was to be based in Miami-Dade County, Florida, with Miami International Airport (MIA) and Los Angeles International Airport (LAX) as initial operating hubs.

== Scheduled passenger service ==
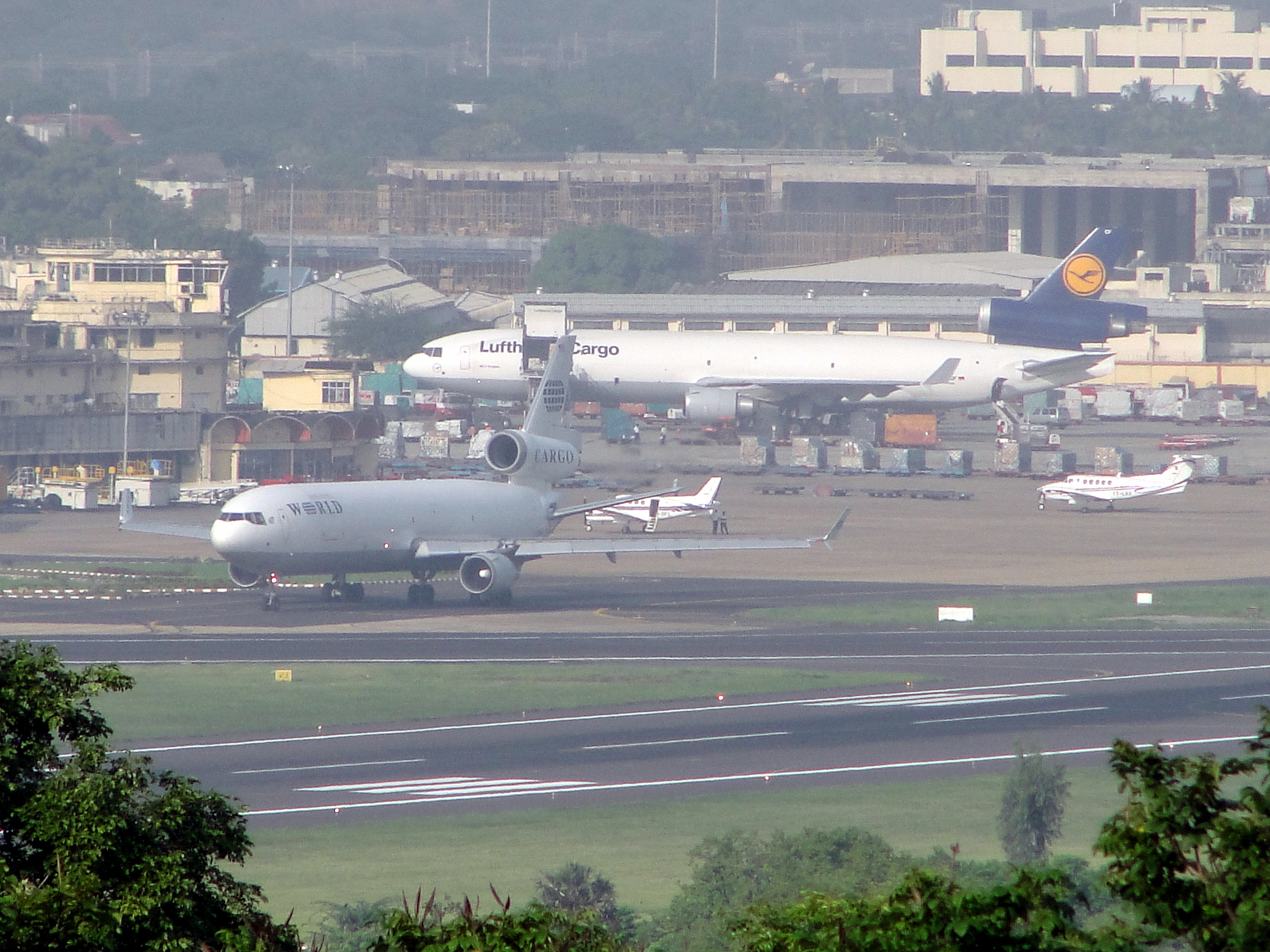
World Airways McDonnell Douglas MD-11F taxiing at Chennai International Airport

World Airways operated scheduled international and domestic passenger service with its McDonnell Douglas DC-10 wide body jetliners, the Boeing 747-200, as well as Boeing 727 jets. Scheduled service began in the late 1970s with airline deregulation, starting April 11, 1979, ending September 15, 1986. Crew bases included Wrightstown, NJ (WRI-closed), Oakland, CA (OAK-company headquarters), Los Angeles, CA (LAX), Baltimore, MD (BWI), and later San Francisco, CA (SFO). The company theme song in the early 1980s, featured at the beginning of the onboard aircraft safety videos and used for advertising, had an instrumental version that played on an easy listening radio station in the San Francisco Bay Area until new advertising was introduced in 1985. The Airline revisited scheduled service in 1996 with the McDonnell Douglas MD-11 aircraft, but this was short lived. Destinations served included:

- Baltimore, MD (BWI)
- Frankfurt, Germany (FRA)
- Honolulu, HI (HNL)
- Kansas City, MO (MCI)
- London, England (LGW)
- Los Angeles, CA (LAX)
- Newark, NJ (EWR)
- Oakland, CA (OAK)
- Orlando, FL (MCO)
- San Francisco, CA (SFO)
- Boston, MA - (BOS)
- San Juan, PR - (SJU)

== Fleet ==
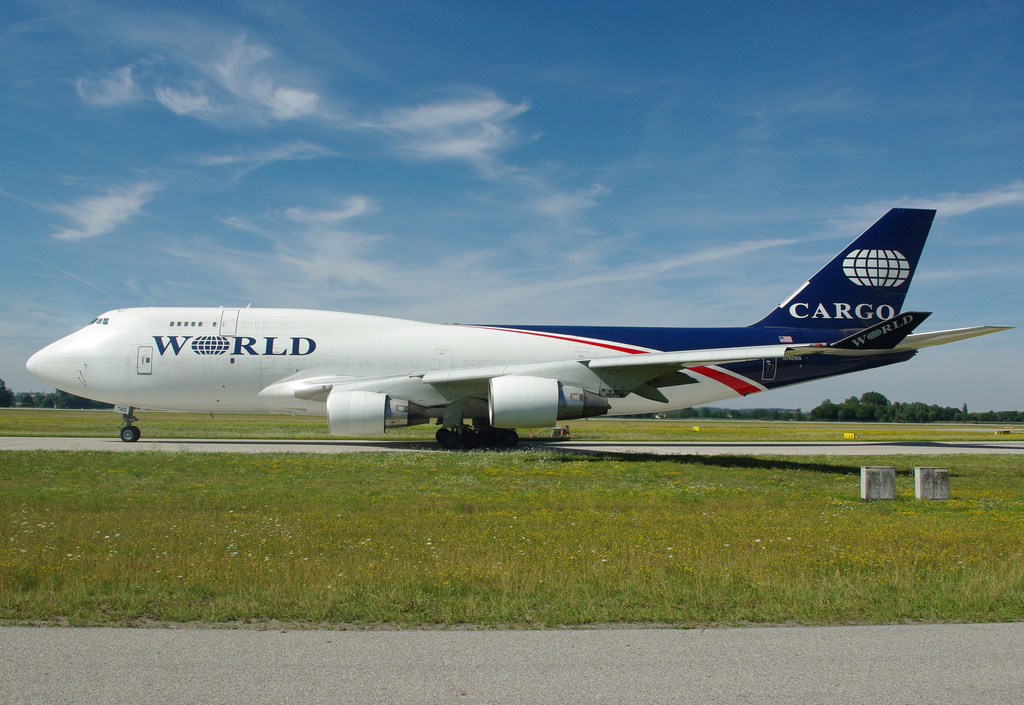
A World Cargo Boeing 747-400BDSF at Munich Airport, Germany (2009)

Year end 1950:

- 2 Curtiss C-46

30 June 1962:

- 8 Douglas DC-6A/B
- 7 Lockheed L-1049H Super Constellation
- 2 Lockheed L-1649A Starliner

As of March 2014, the World Airways fleet consisted of the following aircraft, with an average fleet age of 19.8 years:

World Airways fleet
Aircraft	In Service	Orders	Passengers		Notes
Aircraft	In Service	Orders	Y	Total	Notes
McDonnell Douglas MD-11	3	—	355	355	
World Airways Cargo fleet
Boeing 747-400BDSF	2	—	Cargo		
McDonnell Douglas MD-11F	4	—	Cargo		
Total	9				

=== Historical fleet ===
World Airways also previously operated the following aircraft types during its existence:

World Airways historical fleet
Aircraft	Total	Introduced	Retired	Notes
Boeing 314A	5	1948	1950	
Boeing 707-320	4	1972	1975	Leased from Pan Am
Boeing 707-320C	9	1963	1979	
Boeing 727-100	4	1985	1986	Leased from Skybus
Boeing 727-100C	8	1969	1979	
Boeing 727-200	3	1986	1987	Leased from Skybus
Boeing 747-100SF	1	1981	1982	Transferred to Avianca
Boeing 747-200C	3	1973	1987	
Convair CV-440	1	1971	1985	
Curtiss C-46 Commando	2	1949	1955	
Douglas C-54 Skymaster	10	1953	1961	
Douglas DC-6A	11	1960	1968	
Douglas DC-6B	4	1960	1972	
Douglas DC-8-61	1	1975	1976	Leased from Capitol Air
Douglas DC-8-63CF	7	1971	1984	
Lockheed L-1049H Super Constellation	7	1960	1964	
Lockheed L-1649A Starliner	4	1962	1964	
McDonnell Douglas DC-10-10	11	1984	1994	
McDonnell Douglas DC-10-10F	1	1993	1994	Transferred to FedEx Express
McDonnell Douglas DC-10-30	20	1983	2010	
McDonnell Douglas DC-10-30CF	13	1978	1995	Written off as Flight 30
McDonnell Douglas DC-10-30ER	1	2008	2009	Written off as Flight 8535
McDonnell Douglas DC-10-30F	4	2001	2012	
McDonnell Douglas MD-11ER	2	2001	2012	

== Corporate headquarters ==
World Airways's corporate headquarters were in Peachtree City, Georgia in Greater Atlanta.

In 1956, World Airways relocated its headquarters from the Teterboro, New Jersey to the grounds of Oakland International Airport (OAK) in Oakland, California in the San Francisco Bay Area. World Airways built the World Air Center at Oakland, which served as the company headquarters and maintenance facilities from 1973 through 1986. The World Air Center hangar was able to accommodate four 747s and provided maintenance services to other carriers, as well as the U.S. military. In 1987, headquarters moved to unincorporated Fairfax County, Virginia, near Herndon, in Greater Washington DC. In 2001 World Airways relocated to Peachtree City from Fairfax County.

== Accidents and incidents ==
- September 19, 1960: Flight 830, a DC-6AB N99709, took off from the Agana Naval Air Station on Guam for a night VFR flight to Wake Island. The plane made a right turn after takeoff and climbed until striking Mount Barrigada 300 feet above airfield elevation and slid into thick underbrush. Seven of eight crew and 73 of 86 passengers died. The probable cause was the failure of the pilot to comply with published departure procedures.
- September 8, 1973: Flight 802, a DC-8-63CF N802WA operating a cargo flight for the Military Airlift Command, crashed into high ground while on approach to Cold Bay Airport, Alaska. All six people on board died. The probable cause was the captain's deviation from approved instrument approach procedures.
- September 20, 1981: On Flight 32, a DC-10 from Baltimore to London, flight attendant Karen Williams died when she became trapped in the lower galley elevator of the double-deck aircraft. An electrical malfunction and human error were both blamed as the cause. The rising elevator trapped the flight attendant between the top of the elevator shaft and a serving cart that she was apparently trying to release from its locking device.
- January 23, 1982: Flight 30, DC-10-30CF N113WA landing at Boston's Logan International Airport under icy conditions and limited visibility slid off the end of the runway into Boston Harbor, separating the cockpit section from the rest of the aircraft. Two missing passengers were reported as fatalities despite no bodies found in the shallow water. The Massachusetts Port Authority was cited for its failure to provide adequate runway braking reports although previous aircraft reported little to no braking action prior to World's landing.
- May 6, 2009: a DC-10-30 with registration N139WA operating as Flight 8535 from Leipzig, Germany for the Military Airlift Command experienced a firm landing at Baltimore-Washington International Airport (BWI). As a result of the captain's response to the firm landing, the plane's nose wheel struck the runway hard two times. The aircraft blew one of its front tires and had to execute a go-around before landing successfully. Several passengers were injured, including the first officer, who suffered back trauma. The age of the aircraft (29 years 11 months at the time of the accident) and the extent of damage to the front landing gear and fuselage resulted in the aircraft being written off. The aircraft was parted out and is now used on-site at the same airport for fire/rescue training and practice purposes.

== See also ==
- Supplemental air carrier
- List of defunct airlines of the United States
