= Charles Sperry Andrews III =

American landscape painter

Sperry Andrews
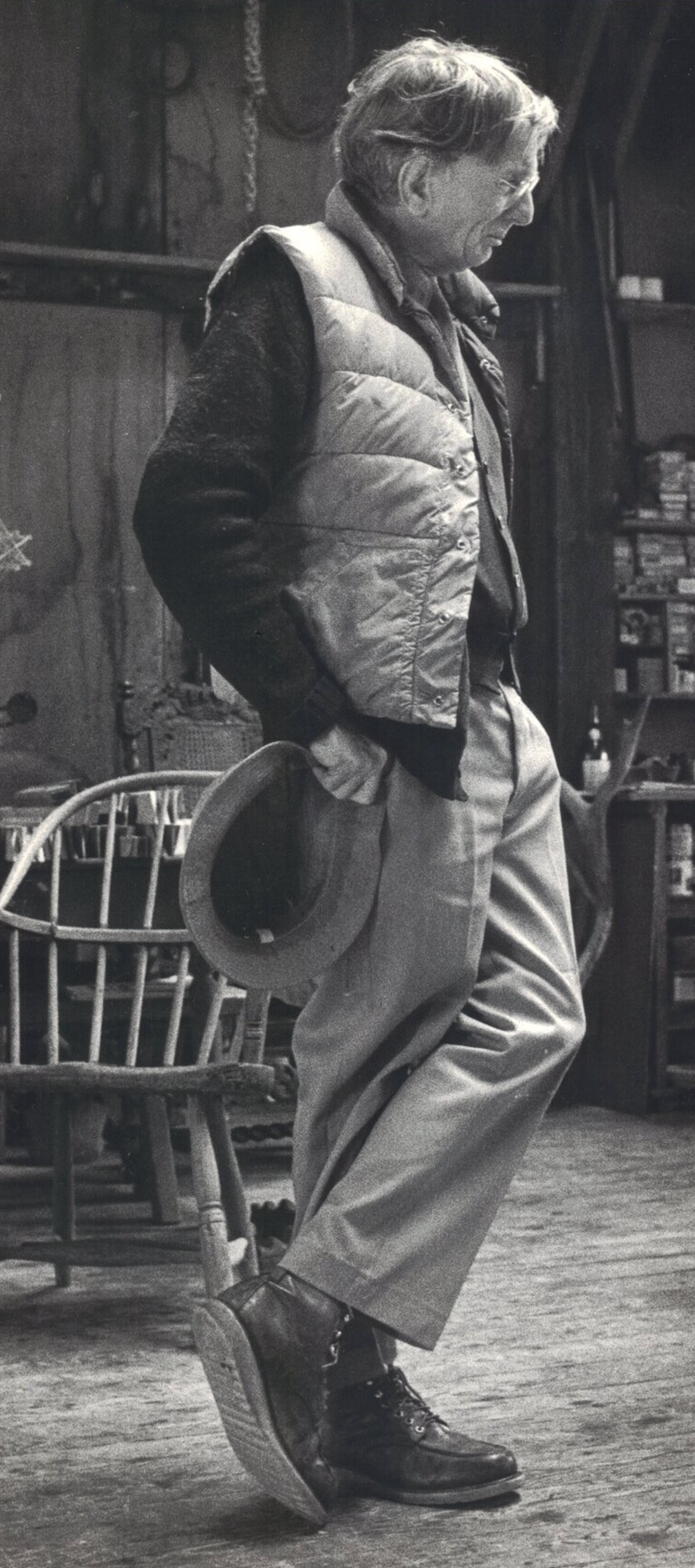
- Sperry Andrews in the big studio c. 1987
- Born: Charles Sperry Andrews III; October 5, 1917; New York City, U.S.
- Died: July 14, 2005 (aged 87); Ridgefield, Connecticut, U.S.
- Education: National Academy of Design; Art Students League of New York
- Known for: Landscape painting, works on paper, historic preservation of Weir Farm National Historical Park
- Movement: Realism, Plein air, Landscape
- Spouse: Doris Bass Andrews (m. 1947; d. 2003)

Charles Sperry Andrews III (1917–2005), professionally known as Sperry Andrews, was an American landscape painter and educator. He was elected a National Academician by the National Academy of Design in 1994 and spent nearly five decades living and working at Weir Farm in Wilton, Connecticut. His paintings are held in the permanent collections of the National Academy of Design, the American Academy of Arts and Letters, The Century Association, the Wadsworth Atheneum Museum of Art, and other public and private institutions.

== Early life and education ==
Charles Sperry Andrews III was born in Manhattan, New York, in 1917. In 1920, his family moved to Bronxville, New York.

Andrews began sketching during his childhood. He studied at the National Academy of Design from 1933 to 1936. Under the GI Bill, he resumed his art studies at the Art Students League of New York from approximately 1946 to 1948. During his time at the League, he received instruction from American modernist Morris Kantor, who introduced him to early elements of Cubist structural composition.

In 1947, Andrews married artist and preservationist Doris Bass Andrews.

== World War II military service ==
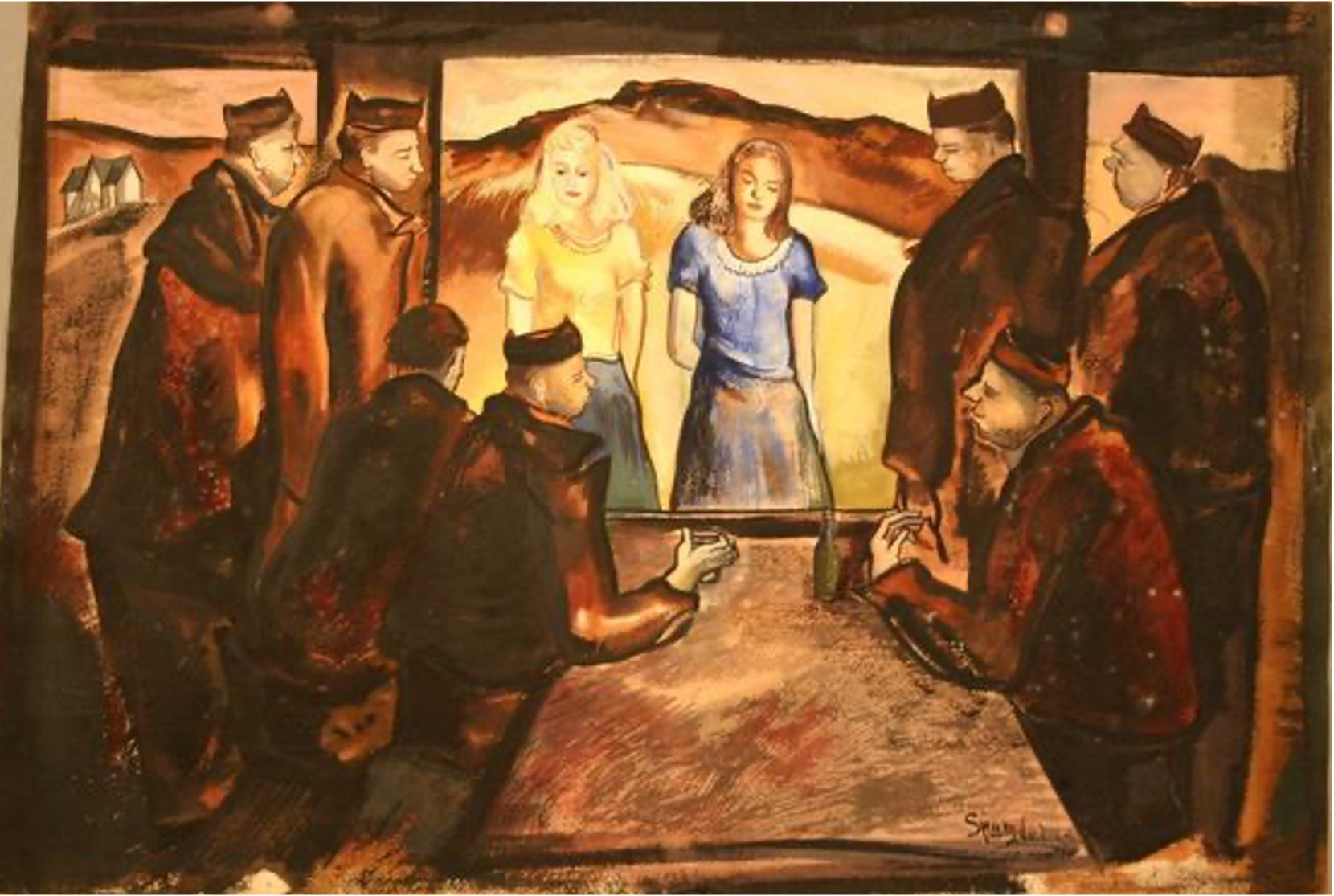
GIs and Icelanders, gouache, c. 1942

Andrews enlisted in the United States Army on February 19, 1941, initially serving with the 50th Ordnance Company. Promoted to Sergeant in August 1941, he was deployed overseas to Iceland in September 1941 as part of Task Force 4. During his time in Iceland, he produced gouache sketches documenting the local volcanic landscape, churches, GIs, and residents. He served in Iceland until November 1943 before transferring to the European Theater of Operations via Scotland and England.

Andrews deployed to mainland France on June 9, 1944 at Omaha Beach and was elevated to Technical Sergeant in August 1944. During his service in Western Europe, he earned two Bronze Service Stars for his participation in the Northern France and Central Europe/Rhineland campaigns. He returned to the United States in April 1945 and received an honorable discharge on June 10th 1945.

== Artistic style ==
Andrews was primarily a plein air landscape painter who worked in oil, watercolor, pastel, gouache, scratchboard, etching, graphite, and charcoal. The majority of his works were created at locations throughout Connecticut, New York, and Rhode Island. Describing his direct, observational approach to landscape painting, Andrews stated: "An artist friend once told me that there are two kinds of artists—the eyeballers and the cerebrals... I'm an eyeballer, I'd say. I'm inspired by things I see." He used a modified Willys Jeep as his mobile studio for overnight painting trips.

Two of his early paintings, Buttery's Mill and Melody Fair, were featured in Ernest W. Watson's 1959 book Composition in Landscape and Still Life. He later moved away from his post-war cubist style toward realism, but traces of the former are evident in his landscapes from the 1960s. Stylistically, his landscape interpretations of the New England countryside in the 1980s were noted by The New York Times art critic Vivien Raynor for their use of color and structural composition.

Andrews was known for working directly in nature rather than relying on studio reconstruction. In 1983, Charles Ferguson, then-director of the New Britain Museum of American Art, remarked on Andrews' practice and stylistic influences:

Sperry Andrews paints year round out-of-doors…His paintings are completed on the spot, not the usual 'sketch from the field and finish it in the studio' scheme... That is undoubtedly why Sperry Andrews' paintings and drawings have such freshness and harmony of light, color and line. One may find traces of Cubism and the Oriental in his work but he has developed a blend which is uniquely and truly his own.

— Charles Ferguson, Director, New Britain Museum of American Art (1983)

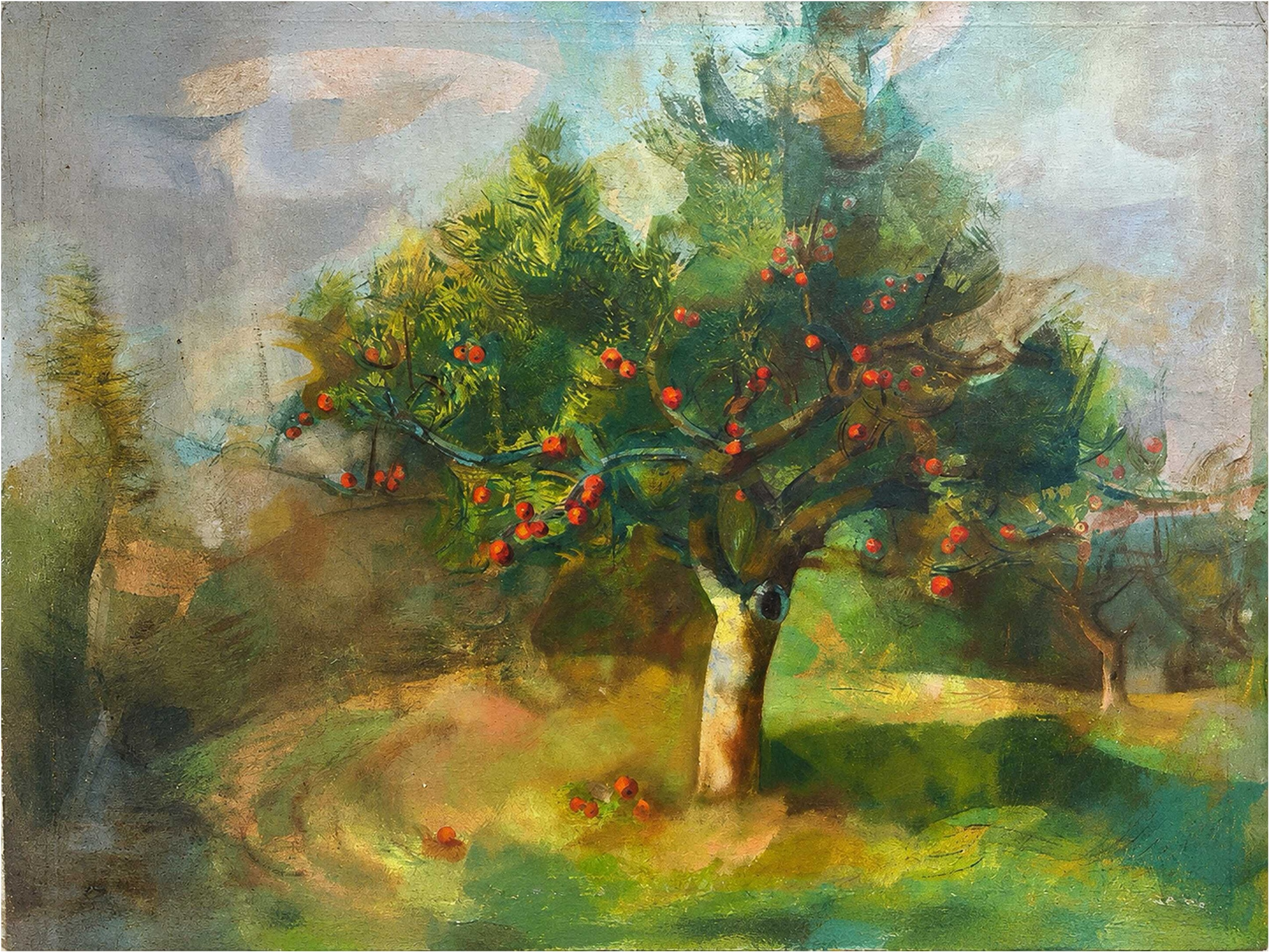
Apple Tree, Weir Farm (c. 1960), oil

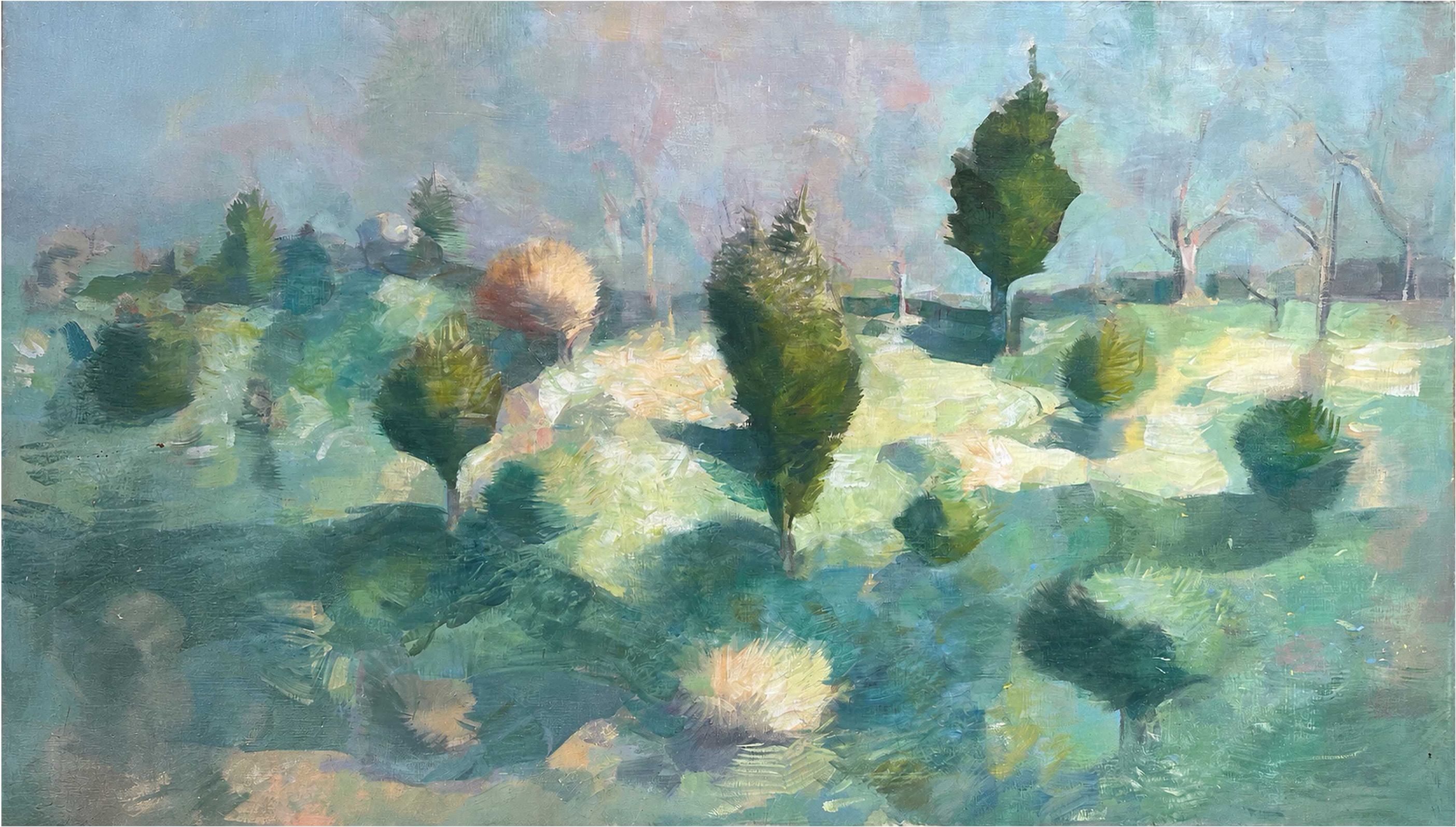
Hillside Pasture (c. 1960), oil

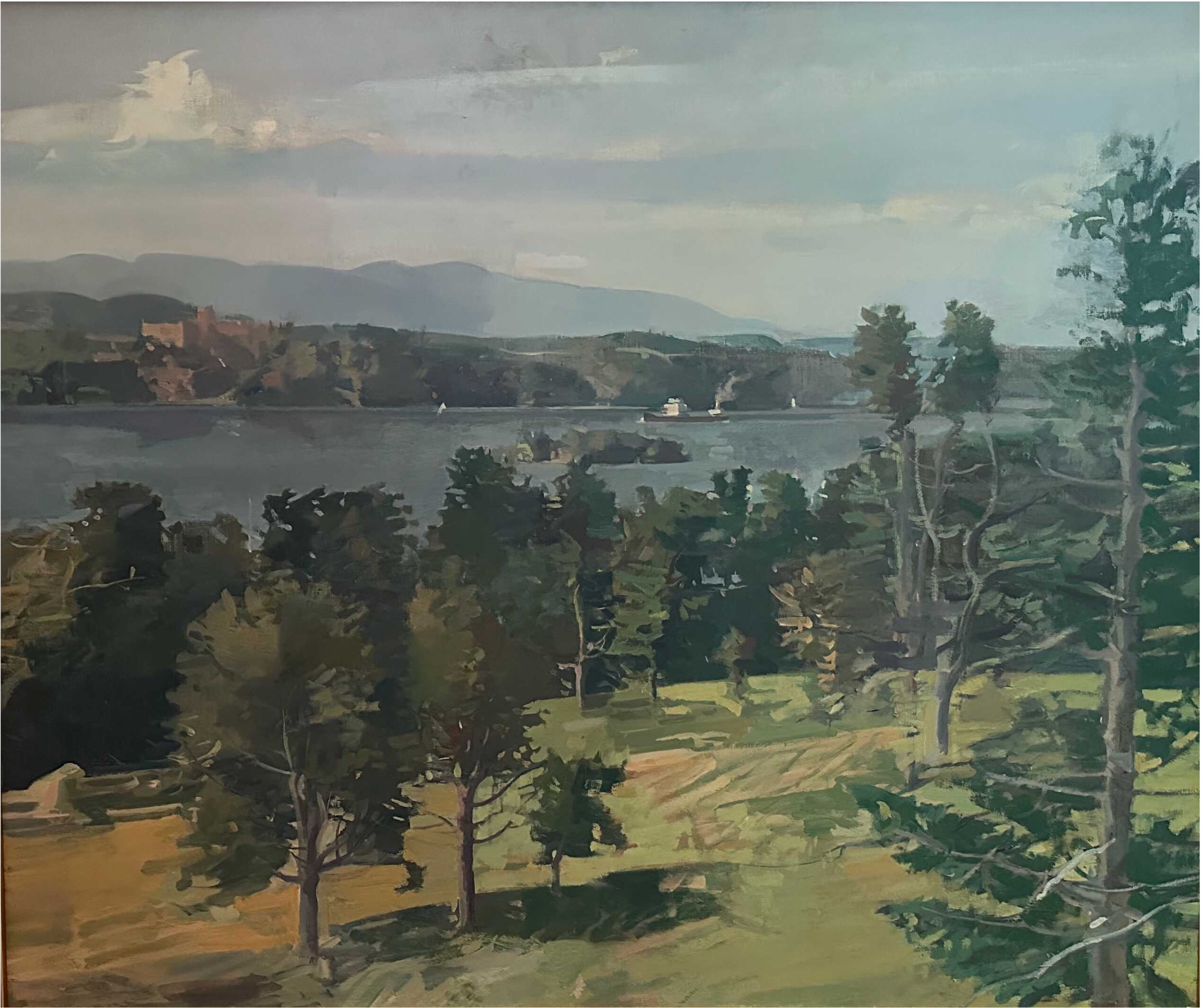
Vanderbilt Mansion (c. 1980), oil
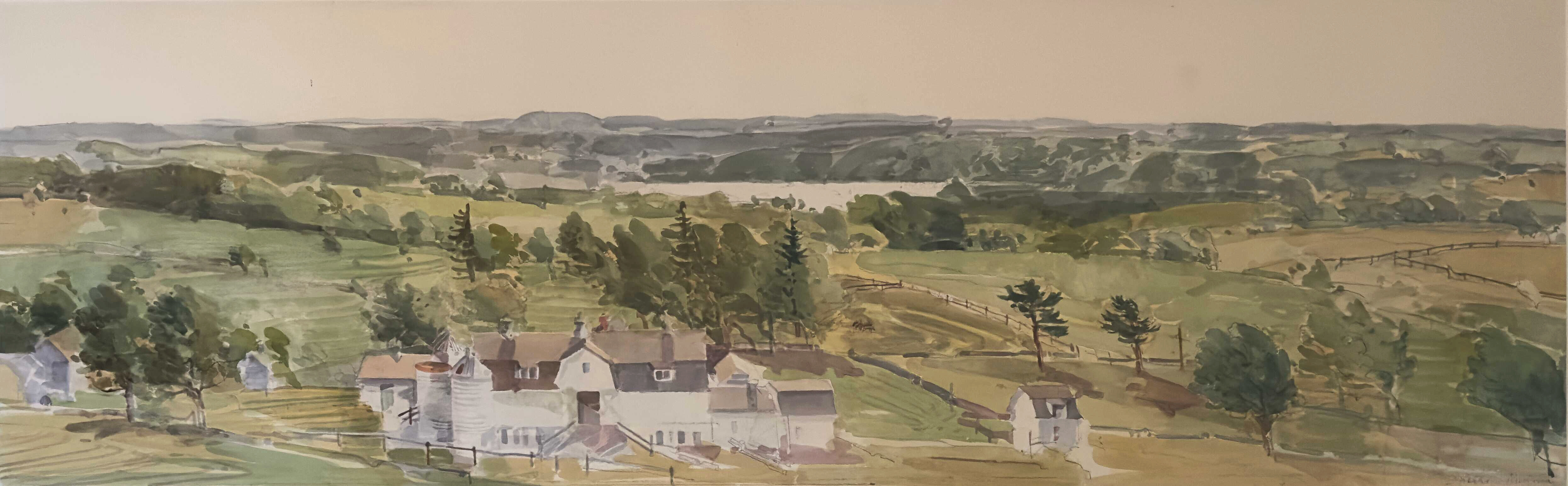
Keeler Farm, North Salem, NY (c. 1980), watercolor

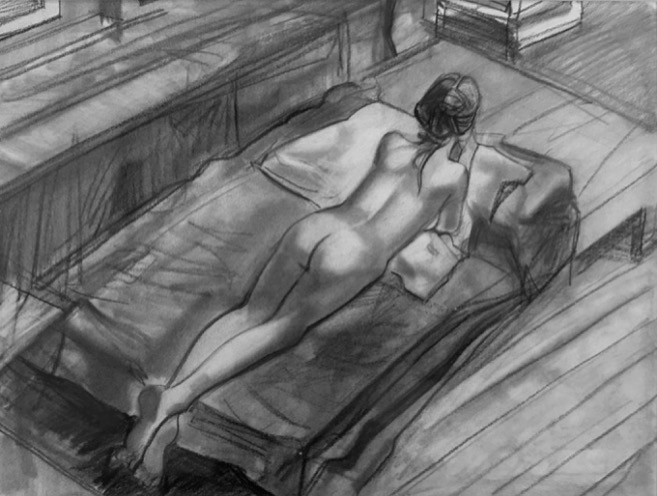
Reclining Nude (c. 1980), graphite and charcoal

Throughout his career, Andrews regularly attended life drawing sessions, producing figurative works in oil, watercolor, scratchboard, graphite, and charcoal.

== Artistic network and teaching ==
After moving to Connecticut, Andrews initiated a friendship with sculptor Mahonri Young, the son-in-law of American Impressionist J. Alden Weir. Andrews frequented Young's property to paint the surroundings. Andrews also maintained friendships with several 20th-century American painters and illustrators, including Rockwell Kent, the illustrator Robert Andrew Parker, the watercolorist Charles Reid, and the painter John Hubbard.

In addition to his studio practice, Andrews served as an instructor at the Silvermine School of the Arts in Westport, Connecticut, and taught at the Wooster Community Arts Center in Danbury, Connecticut.

== Weir Farm ==
In 1957, Andrews and Doris, purchased the Julian Alden Weir farmhouse on the border of Wilton and Ridgefield, Connecticut. The surrounding landscape became one of the primary subjects of his work, generating a body of paintings centered on the historic grounds.

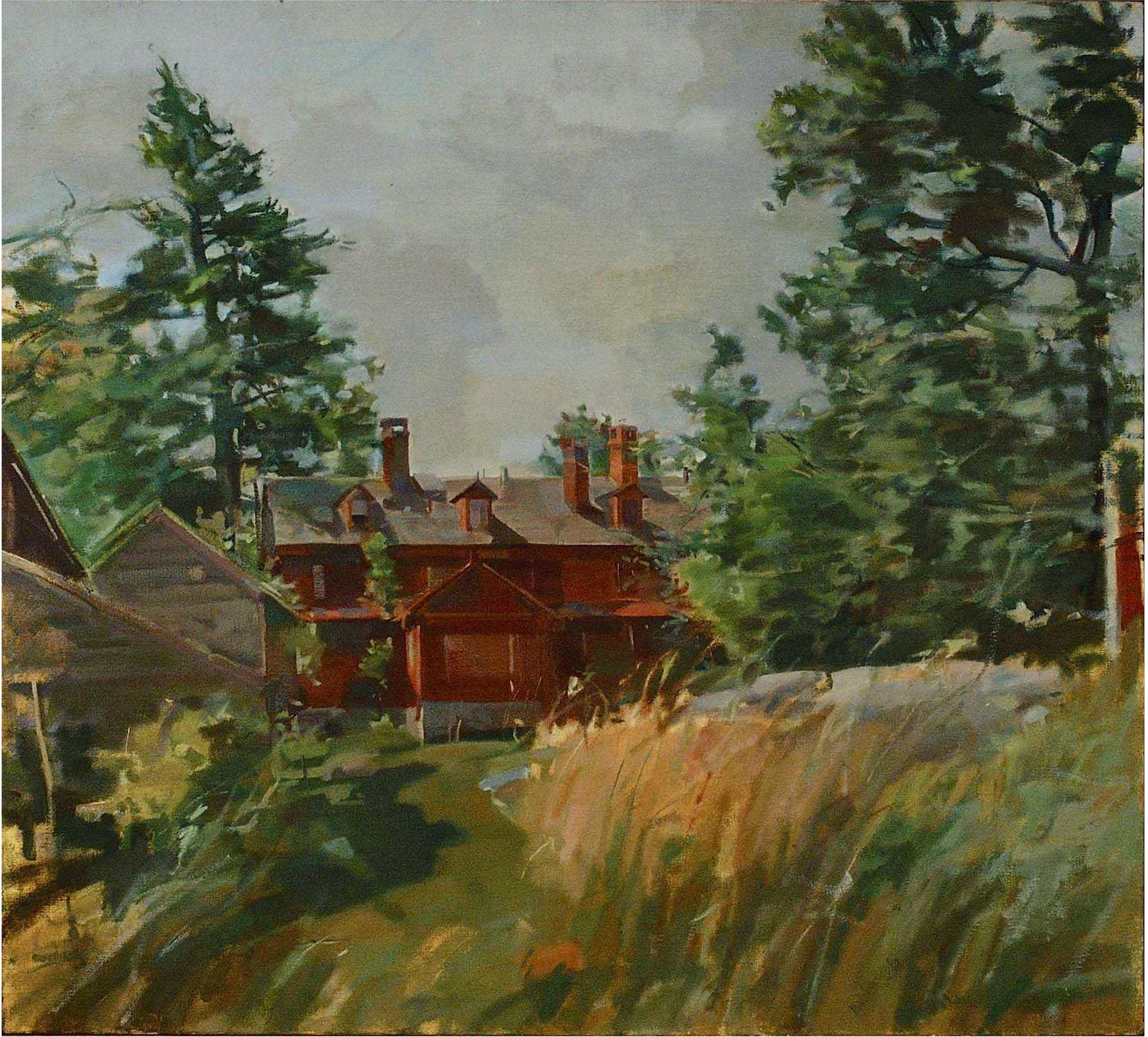
Weir House, Ridgefield, Connecticut (c. 1980), oil on canvas

To prevent commercial real estate development on the property, the couple worked with local preservation and environmental groups to protect the site. In 1990, the United States Congress designated the property as the Weir Farm National Historic Site (later designated a National Historical Park). Andrews lived and maintained his studio on the property until his death in 2005.

== Block Island ==
View of Crescent Beach Block Island, Rhode Island c. 1980

In 1955, Andrews began frequenting Block Island, Rhode Island. Over the next four decades, he created a large body of work featuring the coastline (including Crescent Beach and Mohegan Bluffs), watercraft in Old Harbor and New Harbor, farms, cottages, Victorian-era hotels, and landmarks such as the Southeast Lighthouse. A detail of one of his paintings of the town is reproduced on the cover of S.T. Livermore's A History of Block Island.

=== Affiliations and memberships ===
Andrews was elected an Associate National Academician (ANA) by the National Academy of Design in 1990, and a full National Academician (NA) in 1994. He was elected a member of the Century Association in New York City in 1993.

=== Collections ===
His work is held in the permanent collections of the following institutions:

- National Academy of Design (New York, NY)
- American Academy of Arts and Letters (New York, NY) – acquired via the Childe Hassam Fund purchase, 1952
- The Century Association (New York, NY)
- Wadsworth Atheneum Museum of Art (Hartford, CT)
- New Britain Museum of American Art (New Britain, CT)
- Columbus Museum of Art (Columbus, OH)
- Miami University Art Museum (Oxford, OH)
- Flinn Gallery (Greenwich, CT)
- Weir Farm National Historical Park Museum Collection (Wilton/Ridgefield, CT)

=== Awards ===
- 1950 – First Julius Hallgarten Prize, National Academy of Design (for Ballet Dancer)
- 1950 – Prize Award, Silvermine Guild of Artists
- 1951 – Major Award, Annual All New England Exhibition, Silvermine Guild of Artists
- 1952 – First Prize, St. Lawrence University Exhibition (Canton, NY)
- 1954, 1956 – William Bradford Green Memorial Prize for Landscape, Connecticut Academy of Fine Arts
- 1962 – Salmagundi Club Award for a U.S. Citizen, Audubon Artists 20th Annual Exhibition
- 1978 – Certificate of Merit, National Academy of Design
- 1988 – John Pike Memorial Award, 163rd Annual Exhibition, National Academy of Design

=== Selected exhibitions ===
- 1938, 1940, 1947, 1950–1952, 1958 – Annual Exhibitions, National Academy of Design, New York City
- 1950, 1952, 1953 – Ferargil Galleries (Solo exhibitions in 1952 and 1953), New York City
- 1951 – Connecticut Contemporary Painting (Traveling exhibition)
- 1953 – Los Angeles County Fair, Los Angeles, CA
- 1954, 1955 – Kipnis Gallery, Westport, Connecticut
- 1955 – Slater Memorial Museum, Norwich, Connecticut
- 1957 – Wadsworth Atheneum, Hartford, Connecticut
- 1980 – Regional Landscapes in Oil and Watercolor, Bethel Gallery, Bethel, Connecticut
- 1981 – Tri-State Exhibition, Katonah Gallery, Katonah, New York

=== Posthumous exhibitions ===
- 2013 – Remembering Times Past, Jessie Edwards Gallery, Block Island, Rhode Island
- 2013 – C. Sperry Andrews III: Paintings, Wilton Library, Wilton, Connecticut
