= Charles Reid (painter) =

American painter (1937–2019)

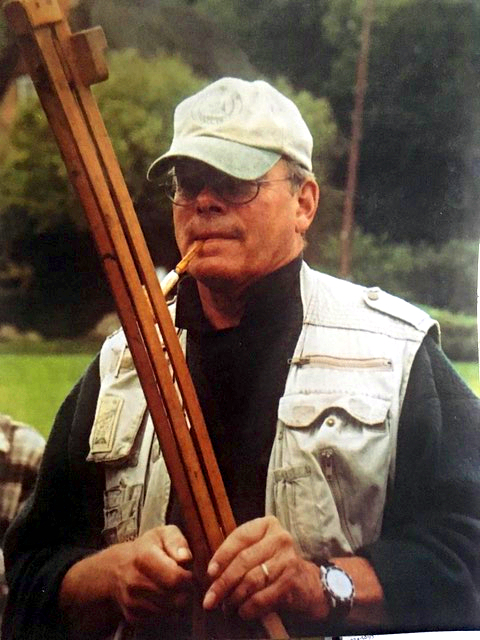
- Charles Reid setting his easel
- Born: August 12, 1937; Cambridge NY
- Died: June 1, 2019 (aged 81); Westport, Connecticut
- Education: Art Student League of New York
- Known for: Painting
- Website: https://www.charlesreidart.com

Charles Clark Reid (August 12, 1937 – June 1, 2019) was an American painter, illustrator, and teacher, notable for his watercolor style. He won numerous national and international awards for both his watercolor and oil works, and also hosted many workshops in the US and abroad. He published numerous books and instructional DVDs and created a postage stamp and an iconic ad campaign with his watercolor depictions. His watercolor works and oil paintings are in private and college museum collections.

== Early life ==
Reid became interested in painting at the age of 14 when his parents encouraged him by letting him use a room in the family home for his art. His father gave him illustrated history books and books about Charles Marion Russell and Frederic Remington, both known for their paintings of the American Old West. Reid's father enrolled him in a correspondence course at the Famous Artists School, when he was 16 years old. Reid also attended South Kent School and the University of Vermont (1955–1957).

Disillusioned while at the University of Vermont he enrolled in the Art Students League of New York while in Manhattan from 1957 to 1959. He met Frank J. Reilly there, who became his teacher.

He was invited to exhibit in New York City at the ROKO Gallery and at the FAR Gallery during 10 years in the 1970s until its closure in 1979.

== Recognition and honors ==
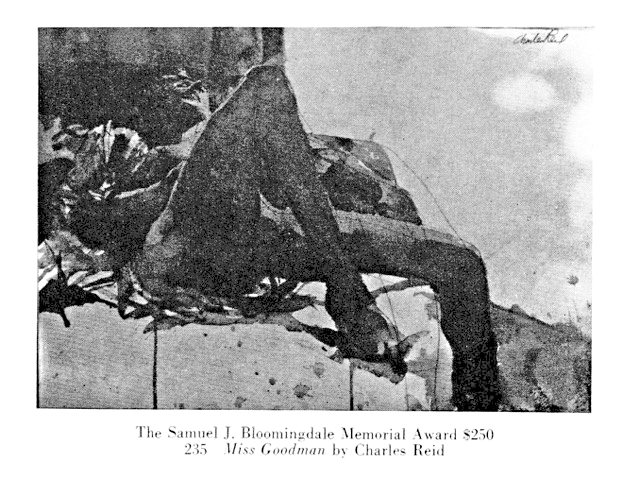
1975 American Watercolor Society Award

Although not a member of the American Watercolor Society, they exhibited Reid's work four times: in 1973 with Sleeping Girl, in 1975 with Miss Goodman, in 1978 with Narda, and in 1984 with Mary. Reid won the Samuel J. Bloomingdale Memorial Award with Miss Goodman and the High Winds Award with Narda.

In 1975, he won the American Academy of Arts and Letters' Hassam, Speicher, Betts, and Symons Purchase Fund Award with Wally. He won the same award again in 1976 with In the Studio.

In 1975, he was admitted as an Associate at the American National Academy of Design, and in 1983 he became an Academician.

- In 1971, he won the Julius Hallgarten award, Debbie, for the one of three best Oil paintings of the year, by an artist from the United States, under 35 years of age.
- 2nd Altman prize (figure) 1972, Thursday Morning.
- 1st Altman prize (figure) 1974.
- Thomas B. Clarke prize 1978, Sarah, for the best annual American figure composition.
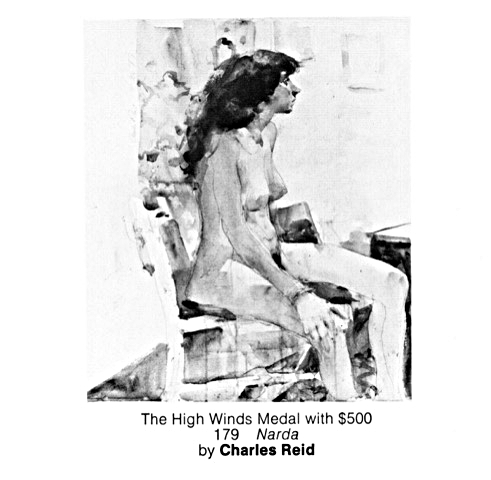
- 1978 American Watercolor Society Award
  Salmagundi award, 1975.
- Henry Ward Ranger fund, 1974, Friends.
- Emil and Dines Carlsen award for the best annual still life painting.
- Adolph and Clara Obrig for the best oil painting by an American artist.

He joined the National Academy of Design in 1980.

In 1983, he was awarded a silver medal from the Society of Illustrators.

In 1988 he joined the Century Association.

In 2013, he won a gold medal at the annual Portrait Society of America, The Art of The Portrait International Conference. The Gold Medal is awarded to "individuals whose work has revolutionized the practice and influenced others". Reid also won The Purchase Award at the second Shanghai Zhujiajiao International Watercolor Biennial Exhibition (also called Shanghai International Biennial Exhibition) in 2013.

He has been exhibited in major institutions including The Butler Institute of Fine Art and the Pennsylvania Museum of Art.

== Public collections ==
Reid's works are found:

- Smith College, Friends gift of Ranger Fund
- Brigham Young University (Utah)
- Yellowstone Art Center
- Century Association
- Marketing Corp. of America
- National Academy of Design

== Influences ==
Charles Reid was a pupil of Frank Reilly who was tutored by professor of drawing George Bridgman and by Franck-Vincent DuMond, both of whom were influenced and connected to the French academic style of the late 19th century. Reilly passed on these influences to Reid. Both Bridgman and DuMond had studied at the Ecole des Beaux Arts de Paris and at the Académie Julian.

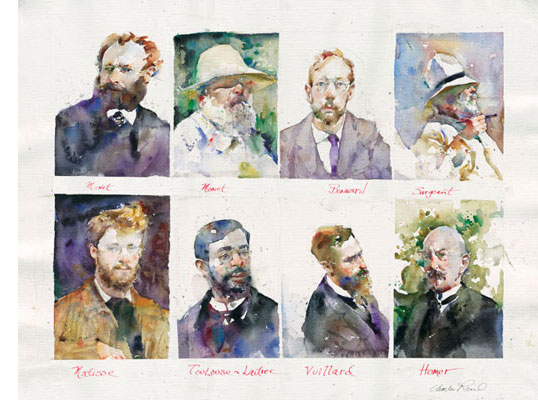
Favorite Artists by Charles Reid

Reid received teachings based on the contributions of the great pictorial movements and his art is influenced by French impressionists like Edouard Manet, whose simplification of forms he appreciated. As Amanda Apostol said he also refers to the Nabis and particularly Edouard Vuillard, Pierre Bonnard, and Toulouse Lautrec, who Reid also counts among his favorite painters. He took from them the use of pure colors for half and midtones values, and the absence of a center of interest.

Reid was also influenced by American post-impressionists such as John Singer Sargent, Winslow Homer and the more contemporary Fairfield Porter, Andrew Wyeth and Joan Mitchell.

== Training ==
While on his honeymoon in Madeira, he met George Jacobs (1926–2002) who colored pen and ink drawings with watercolor. George Jacob's method of painting with watercolor relies heavily on pen lines. In this early period they took daily van trips, painting street scenes and landscapes with Reid first copying Jacobs' style.

When Reid came back to the US in 1964, at twenty-seven he took a job teaching at the Famous Artists School becoming the youngest instructor employed there. At the time, there had been no watercolor instruction. At the end of 4 years, he was asked to set up a figure class in watercolor with no experience other than the month with George Jacobs. His supervisor, Frank Jones, gave him a brief demonstration of a tugboat, highlighting the wet-in-wet technique, and in how to deal with his edges to improve his watercolor technique. That was enough to help create this weekly figure class.

He taught for 10 years at the correspondence school, and he spent each day at the easel. This work served as the basis for his first book Figure Painting in Watercolor. Its publication in 1973 put him in the forefront of people's mind as a watercolorist.

Charles Reid found inspiration in the fashion illustrations of Dorothy Hood, which he admired for her direct and simple style.

In the late 70's and 80's he traveled a great deal and spent time in airports where he developed his contour drawing skill by drawing fellow passengers waiting for flights.

== Technique ==
His work was simple and direct. For portraits he used contour drawings to connect the figure to the background. As a pupil of F. Reilly he focused his works on drawing and usage of perfecting tonal value in his painting.

In the book by JM Parramon, "Creative Watercolor", the author set out the technical elements that establish the singularity of Charles Reid's style. The contour-drawing and his way of applying the color. According to Parramon his paintings show how he "associates the precision of the form to the ease of the line and the color".

His watercolor technique was unconventional. He painted from mid-darks to lights rather than starting light and going dark. He used alla-prima approach, and didn't glaze, which is the traditional way to paint watercolor. He only glazed sometimes for the features of the figures.

Charles Reid perceived still life in an abstract way, seeing large splot of light and dark. Then he put paint as a diagram of colors in order to establish the color combination of his painting.

He painted directly onto paper, with the intention of getting the right value and color on the first try. This contributes to the sense of spontaneity and freshness to his work. Although not necessarily happy with mistakes, he considered them to be essential in retaining a sense of freshness, suggesting things are "alive".

Contrary to what his style suggests, he worked in a meticulous manner avoiding overworking, each brushstroke counts, and he deals with edges. He considers painting a "happening", like jazz. To American Artist he said, "The more you know the more you can improvise". He starts each painting like a new experience, pretending he does not know how to paint.

He looked at his watercolors more as poems that are completed after an hour or two, whereas his oils were like novels that required a more detailed depiction of the scene. Reid was a studio painter and a plein-air painter, but he tended to prefer the warmth of the south light, thinking it worked well for him.

== Collaborations ==
On March 18, 1972, Reid was the first to design an 8 cent US Postal Service stamp that highlighted Family Planning, issued in New York City. It's a vertical stamp showing a family group (husband, wife, daughter and son) walking forward. His inspiration for the painting came from a family photograph.

He painted the illustration for the L.L. Bean Maine Hunting Boot, which has been widely used in advertising in their catalogs, on truck sides and on large cubes throughout stores. The painting also appears on the cover of The Making of an American Icon by Leon Gorman about his experience as the grandson of the founder of L.L. Bean.

He illustrated a limited edition of John Steinbeck's The Grapes of Wrath published in 1978 by Franklin Library.

Further collaborations appeared in American Heritage, Harper's, Sports Afield, Reader's Digest Books and the Franklin Press.

== Teaching ==
As a teacher, Reid hosted fifteen to twenty workshops a year over thirty-five to forty years. He wrote twelve books, eleven of which are about watercolor. He made nine instructional DVDs:

- Figurative Watercolour
- English Watercolour Sketchbook
- Painting Flowers in Watercolor
- Watercolor Secrets
- Flowers in Watercolor
- 10 Lessons Course
- Watercolor Solutions
- Watercolor Landscape Masterclass
- The Figure in Watercolor

He judged in numerous painting exhibitions as well.

== Publications ==
- Figure Painting in Watercolor (1972 Watson-Guptill)
- Portraits Painting in Watercolor (1973 Watson-Guptill)
- Flower Painting in Oil (1976 Watson-Guptill )
- Painting What You Want to See (1983 Watson-Guptill)
- Portrait and Figure Painting in Watercolor (1984 Watson-Guptill)
- Charles Reid: Pulling Your Painting Together (1985 Watson-Guptill)
- Painting by Design (1991 Watson-Guptill)
- The Natural Way to Paint (1994 Watson-Guptill)
- Flower Painting in Watercolor (2001 North Light)
- Charles Reid's Watercolor Secrets (2004 North Light)
- Charles Reid's Watercolor Solutions (2008 North Light)
