= World Airways Flight 830 =

1960 aviation accident

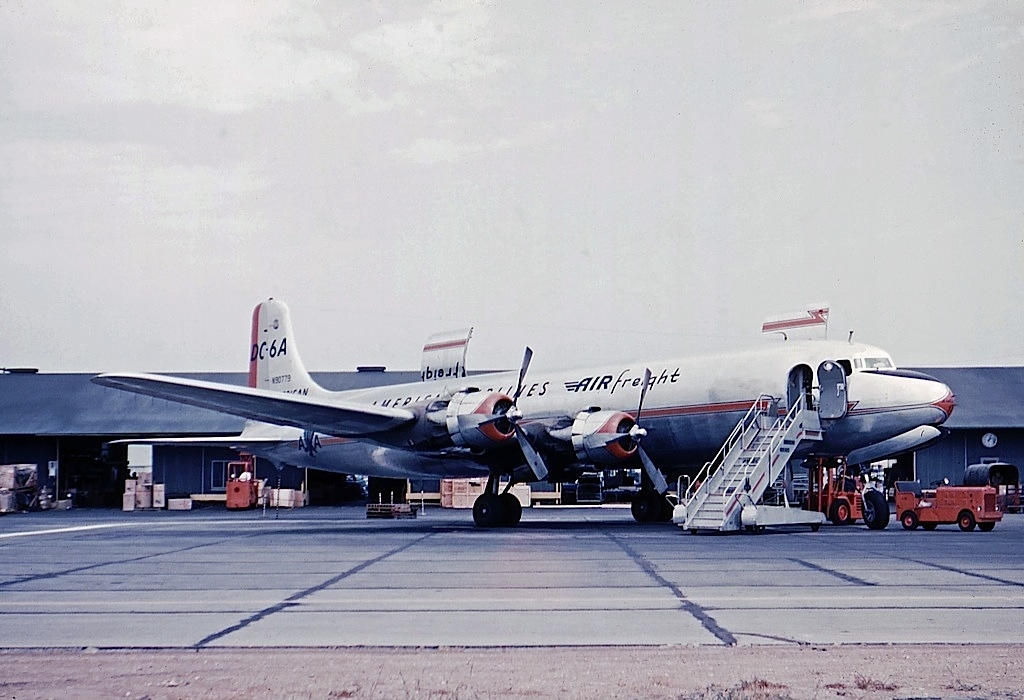
- N90779 while in service with American Airlines as a DC-6A freighter

Crash
- Date: 19 September 1960
- Summary: Controlled flight into terrain caused by pilot error
- Site: Barrigada, Guam, near Naval Air Station Agana; 13.4890°N 144.8269°E

Aircraft
- Aircraft type: Douglas DC-6
- Operator: World Airways
- Call sign: WORLD 830
- Registration: N90779
- Flight origin: Clark Air Force Base, Philippines
- 1st stopover: Naval Air Station Agana, Guam
- 2nd stopover: Wake Island Airfield, Wake Island
- Destination: Travis Air Force Base, California
- Passengers: 86
- Crew: 8
- Fatalities: 80
- Injuries: 10
- Survivors: 14

World Airways Flight 830 was a domestic nonscheduled passenger flight from Clark Air Force Base to Travis Air Force Base. On 19 September 1960, the DC-6, carrying American service members and dependents, collided with Mount Barrigada in Barrigada, Guam during the second leg of the flight, killing 80 of the 94 people on board. The disaster was Guam's deadliest aviation accident until Korean Air Flight 801 crashed on Nimitz Hill in 1997.

== Overview ==
The accident aircraft was manufactured in January 1956. It was originally in service with American Airlines as a freighter until World Airways purchased it sometime after October 1959. At the time of the accident, the aircraft had accumulated 12,746 flight hours.

The Captain was 46-year-old Rudy J. Holman, who had logged 15,681 flight hours, including 2,548 hours in the DC-6. He had completed a proficiency check in the DC-6 the month before the crash. The first officer was 31-year-old Clayborne P. Claunch, who had logged 6,317 flight hours, including 217 hours in the DC-6. The remaining flight crew consisted of 29-year-old flight engineer Roger E. Davis and 27-year-old navigator Edgar W. Schwoyer.

== Flight ==
The aircraft took off from Naval Air Station Agana's runway 6L at 6:00 am. The pilot made a right turn during the climbing procedure and collided with Mount Barrigada 50 seconds after takeoff. The aircraft then slid for about 1,000 ft (305 m) into thick underbrush before coming to a stop. 73 of the 86 passengers and 7 of the 8 crew members on board perished. Most of the casualties were caused by a fire that broke out shortly before the aircraft came to a stop.

== Investigation ==
The Civil Aeronautics Board determined that the crash was caused by the pilot's failure to adhere to standard departure procedures by making a right turn before the aircraft had climbed to 1,000 ft (305 m).
