= World Airways Flight 30 =

1982 aviation accident in Massachusetts

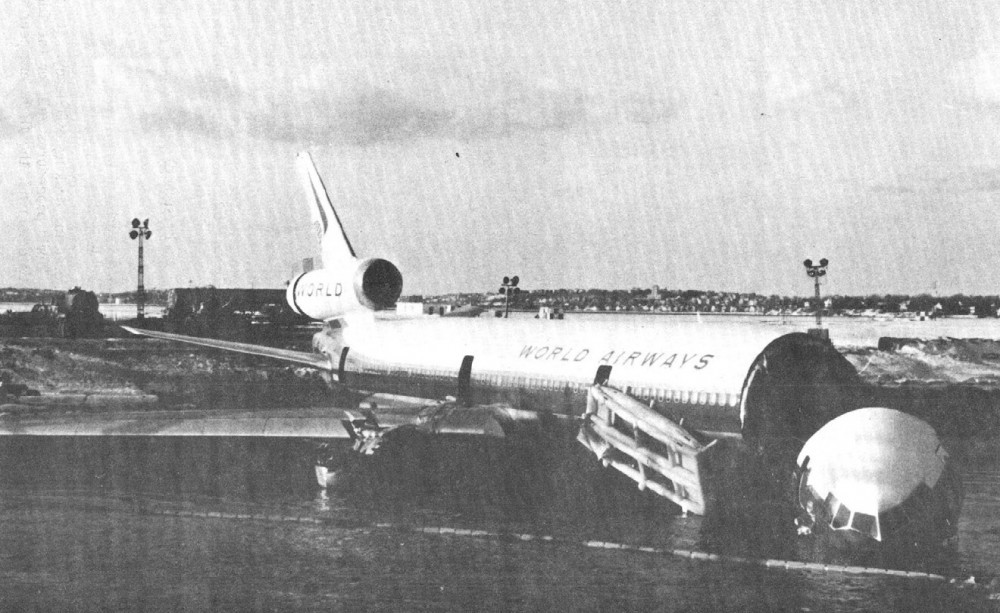
- Wreckage of the aircraft after overshooting the runway

Accident
- Date: January 23, 1982
- Summary: Runway overshoot, inadequate runway inspection by airport personnel, and ATC error
- Site: Logan International Airport Boston, Massachusetts, United States; 42°21′03″N 70°59′23″W

Aircraft
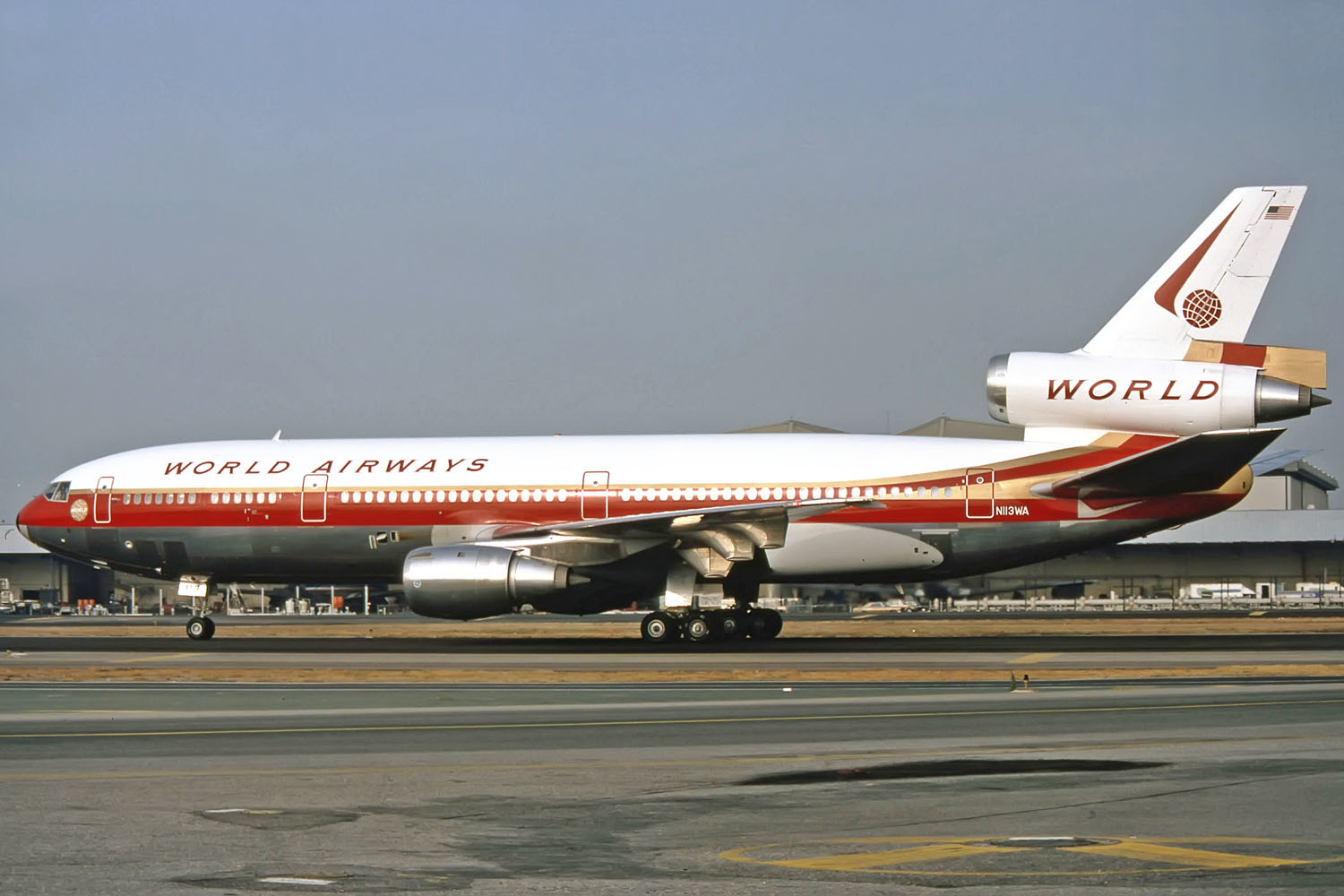
- N113WA, the aircraft involved in the accident, seen in 1980
- Aircraft type: McDonnell Douglas DC-10-30CF
- Operator: World Airways
- IATA flight No.: WO30
- ICAO flight No.: WOA30
- Call sign: WORLD 30
- Registration: N113WA
- Flight origin: Oakland International Airport
- Stopover: Newark Liberty International Airport
- Destination: Logan International Airport
- Occupants: 212
- Passengers: 200
- Crew: 12
- Fatalities: 2
- Injuries: 39
- Survivors: 210

World Airways Flight 30 was a McDonnell Douglas DC-10-30CF airliner which suffered a fatal accident upon landing at Logan International Airport in Boston, skidding into Boston Harbor, on January 23, 1982. Two of the passengers were never found, and are presumed to have drowned.

== Background ==
=== Aircraft ===
The aircraft involved was a McDonnell Douglas DC-10-30CF, registered N113WA. The aircraft was manufactured in 1980, with the manufacturing number 47821, built as the 320th DC-10. It was equipped with 3 General Electric CF6-50C2 engines and had 6,327 airframe hours before the crash.

=== Crew ===
The captain on board Flight 30 was Peter Langley (58). He had 18,091 flight hours, 1,969 were on the DC-10. First Officer Donald Hertzfeldt was 38, with 8,600 flight hours throughout his career. Flight Engineer William Rogers was 56, and had the most flight time out of the crew, having 20,000 flight hours.

== Accident ==
The DC-10 touched down on runway 15R, 2,800 feet (850 m) beyond the displaced threshold. Under normal circumstances, such an incident would have been of minor importance and the plane would have had sufficient space to come to a full stop on the 10,000 feet (3,000 m) long runway. However, the runway was covered in ice, and the braking action was poor to nil (though reported to the pilots as "fair to poor").

When it became apparent that the aircraft was not going to be able to stop on the runway, and since there was insufficient space remaining on the runway to take off again ("touch and go"), the pilots steered the plane off the runway in order to avoid hitting approach lights beyond the runway. The plane then skidded across a field and a taxiway before coming to rest in the 30 °F (−1 °C) waters of Boston Harbor at 7:36 pm local time.

Just 35 minutes before, a Delta Air Lines flight operating as flight 929 reported to the tower that "If nobody else has told you ... It's poor to nil out there on braking." However, this information was not passed along to oncoming flights.

The part of the DC-10 that housed the aircraft's cockpit and forward galley separated from the main body of the aircraft, submerging the first row of passenger seats. The three pilots, two flight attendants, and three passengers ended up in the water. 210 passengers and crew, among them documentarian and television show host Justine Shapiro, survived and at first it was thought all on board had survived. Three days later it was discovered that two passengers were missing -- father and son Walter Metcalf, aged 70, and Leo Metcalf, aged 40, who had changed their flight at the last minute and were not on the passenger list. They were two of the three people to fall out of the plane during the crash, and reportedly neither of the two could swim. Divers were sent into the water, but the search proved unsuccessful. A theory for why the bodies haven't been recovered is that ocean currents have pushed them far away from the airport. As of 2026, neither body has been recovered.

== See also ==
- Aviation safety
