= Weir Farm National Historical Park =

Historic site in Connecticut, US

- IUCN category III (natural monument or feature)
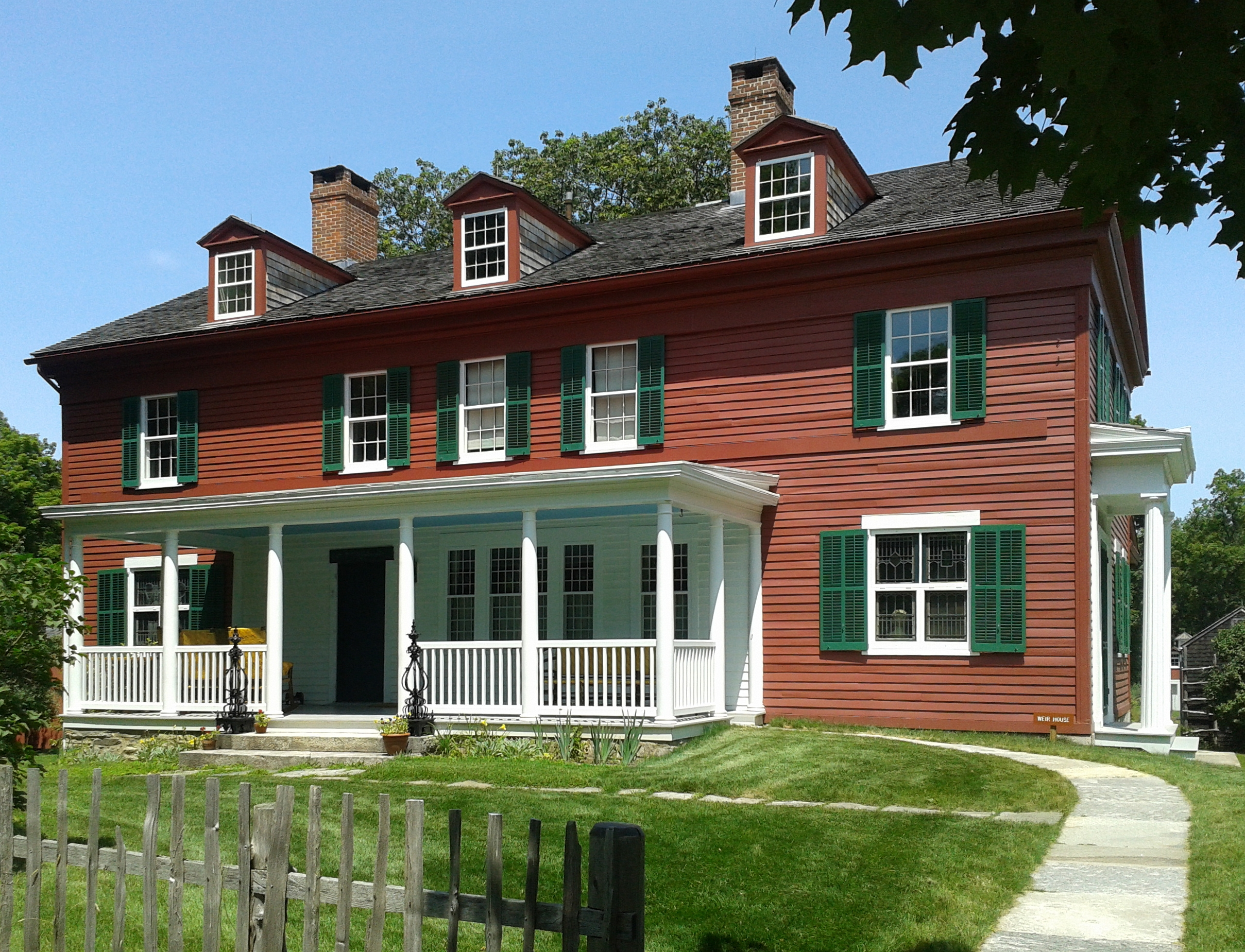
- Main house

- Location within Connecticut Location within the United States
- Location: 735 Nod Hill Road; Fairfield County, Connecticut, United States
- Nearest city: Wilton, Connecticut
- Coordinates: 41°15′29″N 73°27′17″W
- Area: 60 acres (24 ha)
- Established: 1990
- Visitors: 30,339 (in 2025)
- Governing body: National Park Service
- Website: https://www.nps.gov/wefa/index.htm

Weir Farm National Historical Park is located in Ridgefield and Wilton, Connecticut. It commemorates the life and work of American impressionist painter J. Alden Weir and other artists who stayed at the site or lived there, to include Childe Hassam, Albert Pinkham Ryder, John Singer Sargent, and John Twachtman.

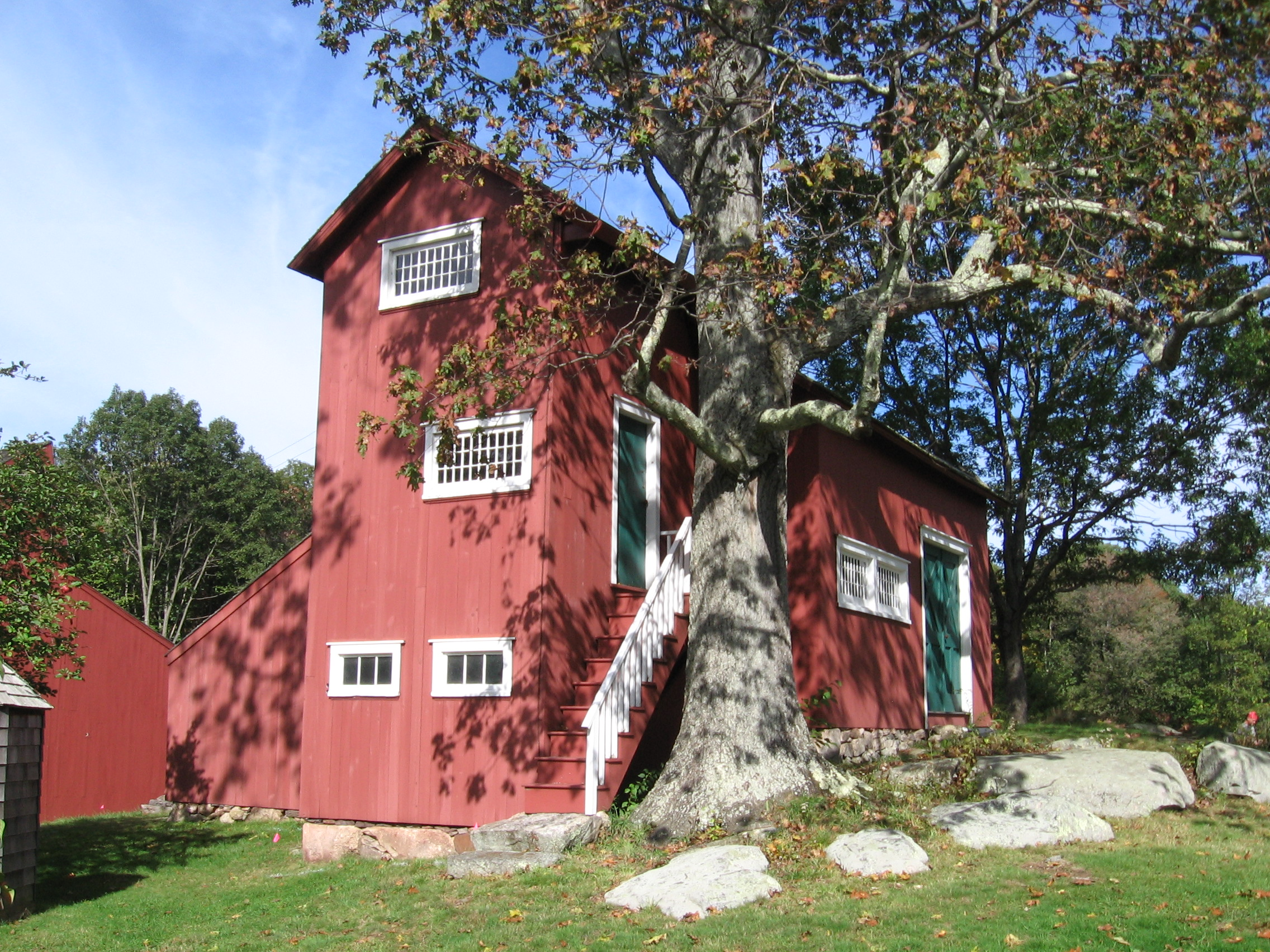
J. Alden Weir's studio at Weir Farm

Weir Farm is one of two sites in the National Park Service devoted to the visual arts, along with Saint-Gaudens National Historical Park.

Both sites maintain ongoing artist-in-residence programs; to date, the Weir Farm Art Center (formerly the Weir Farm Trust) has hosted more than 150 artists for month-long stays at the site. Weir Farm also runs an ongoing "Take Part in Art" program, under which visitors can create their own works on site.

Weir Farm was recognized on the 52nd quarter of the America the Beautiful Quarters Program in 2020.

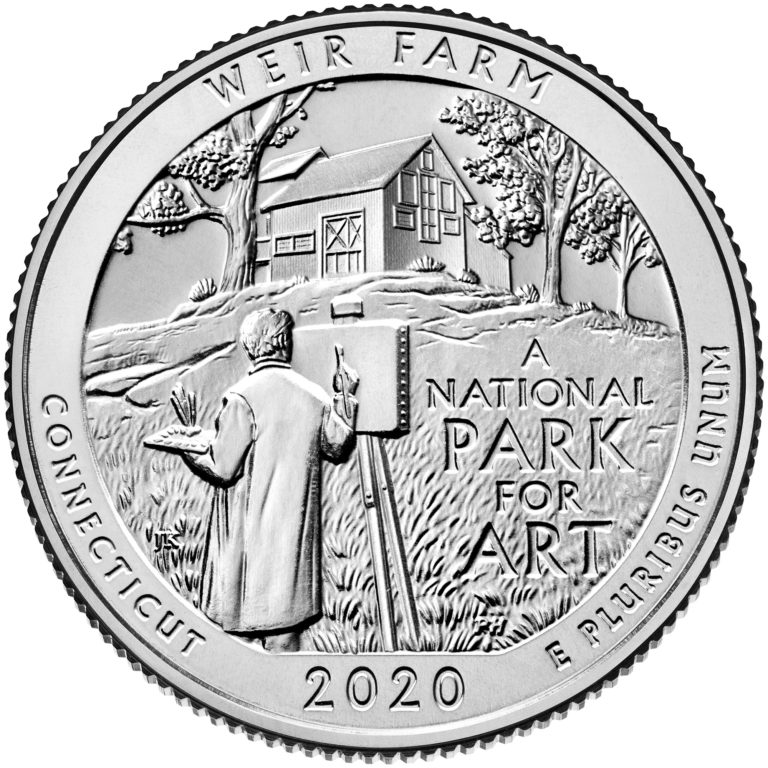
Weir Farm depicted on Connecticut's America the Beautiful quarter

== History ==
After considering the Keene Valley area of New York's Adirondack Mountains for a rural retreat, in 1882 Weir settled instead on hilly countryside in the Branchville section of Ridgefield, acquiring a 153-acre farm there from Erwin Davis in exchange for $10 and a painting. Weir and artists he hosted subsequently produced a large number of paintings depicting Ridgefield landscapes and other nearby countryside.

Weir's daughter Dorothy Weir, a noted artist in her own right, took over management of the property following her father's death in 1919. Sculptor Mahonri Young would build a second studio at Weir Farm after the couple married in 1931.

Artist Sperry Andrews would befriend Mahonri Young and spent several years keeping him company while painting the site. After Young's death Andrews would purchase the property and his wife Doris Andrews lead efforts with Cora Weir Burlingham to preserve the Weir Farm site, resulting in the U.S. government designating it a National Historic Site in 1990. Prior to its permanent protection, Weir Farm had been subdivided for housing development in the late 1980s. The Trust for Public Land worked to reacquire the divided land through close to 2 dozen transactions. The Trust for Public Land worked in partnership with the Weir Farm Trust and the State of Connecticut to advocate for its permanent protection. Sperry and his wife Doris Andrews were given life tenancy and would give impromptu tours of the studios to park visitors until both had passed.

Afterwards the site underwent extensive restoration to transform the park into a more visitor friendly experience. The two artist studios and house were restored to period, and in May 2014 were made accessible to the public again.

The property today includes 16 buildings on 60 acres of land with the grounds including a hiking trail. Tours are offered by National Park Service rangers.

In 2007, the U.S. Department of the Interior sought Congressional approval for the National Park Service to acquire space in nearby Redding, Connecticut, for administration and operational support to Weir Farm. Under existing federal law at the time, the National Park Service was authorized to secure expansion space in Ridgefield and Wilton only.

In 2021 it was redesignated from a National Historic Site to a National Historical Park.

== Notable residents and visitors ==
- Spero Anargyros
- Wilfrid de Glehn
- J. Alden Weir
- Dorothy Weir
- John Ferguson Weir
- Mahonri Young
- Childe Hassam
- Albert Pinkham Ryder
- John Singer Sargent
- John Twachtman

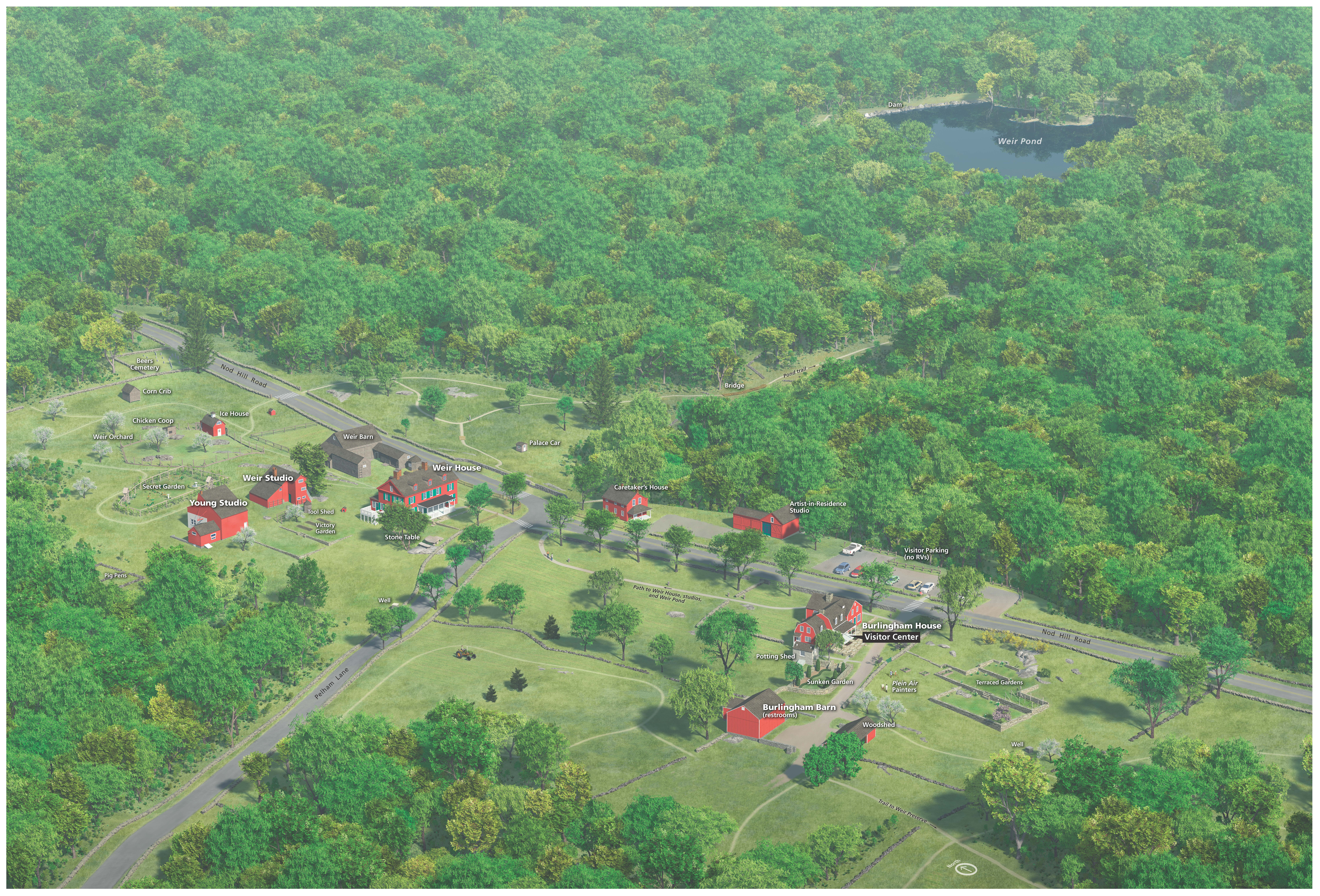
Map of the grounds

== See also ==
- National Register of Historic Places listings in Fairfield County, Connecticut
- Historic Artists' Homes and Studios
