= Garofalo =

Garofalo may refer to:

== People ==
- Il Garofalo (1481–1559), Italian painter
- Agostino Garofalo (born 1984), Italian footballer
- Carlo Giorgio Garofalo (1886–1962), Italian composer and organist
- Janeane Garofalo (born 1964), American actress and activist
- Pat Garofalo (born 1971), Minnesota state-level politician
- Raffaele Garofalo (1851–1934), Italian jurist and criminologist
- Ray Garofalo (b. ca. 1958), Louisiana businessman and politician
- Reebee Garofalo, American musician and popmusi scholar

== Other ==
- a whirlpool off the coast of Italy
- Garofalo, an album by classical composer Joel Spiegelman
