= Gerald McConnell =

American illustrator (1931–2004)

Gerald McConnell (1931 – June 14, 2004) was an American illustrator best known for his works on paperback books. He was born in East Orange, New Jersey and studied under Frank J. Reilly and Dean Cornwell. McConnell also worked on many advertisements, paintings for places like the Air Force Museum, NASA Museum, and National Park Department.

McConnell was known later in his career for his three-dimensional art, improving protections for artist as a leader of the Graphic Artist Guild, teaching for a short time at the Pratt Institute, creating several art books, and founding Madison Square Press. He is credited for working to improve the copyright protections for illustrators.

Story art by Gerald McConnell for Old-fashioned (short story) by Isaac Asimov. Published in American Telephone and Telegraph Company magazine (for shareholders).
