= Dorothy Hood (illustrator) =

American fashion illustrator

- Born: 1902; Lancaster County, Pennsylvania
- Died: 1970 (aged 67–68); New York, New York
- Education: New York School of Applied Design, Art Students League of New York
- Known for: Fashion Illustration
- Elected: Society of Illustrators' Hall of Fame, 1992

Dorothy Hood (1902–1970) was an American fashion illustrator.

== Early life and education ==
Hood was born in Lancaster County, Pennsylvania. She studied at New York School of Applied Design and Art Students League of New York.

== Career ==
Dorothy Hood's effective drawings have an unprecedented place in the field of advertising as a whole, not fashion alone. The substance and interest of her illustrations have become synonymous with Lord & Taylor and have established an unprecedented corporate image. Combining as they do the essence of an artist's personal expression within the framework of advertising, her pages have kept the store with which she is identified in the forefront of fashion advertising for a record number of years. Her fashion figures have personality and vitality.

—Clarissa Rogers, Director, Fashion Advertising

She began working for department stores, including Saks Fifth Avenue, and for art services. Hood designed a logo for Lord & Taylor of the American Beauty rose, to promote "The American Look", a marketing strategy developed by Dorothy Shaver who was the company's first vice president and became president in 1945. Hood and other illustrators—like Jean Karnoff, Helen Hall, and Carl Wilson—incorporated the logo in advertisements for the store. Paul Shaw from Bloomberg Business states that she was the first to incorporate the logo in ads and "As early as 1947, her logos—distinctive in their thin, scratchy line—emerge from swirling pen strokes unifying the various illustrations in an advertisement." Hood was the best known American fashion illustrator at that time and was Lord & Taylor's top illustrator.

Hood was inducted into the Society of Illustrators's Hall of Fame in 1992. Known for her ability to create a "powerful visual identity" for Lord & Taylor, her illustrations are among the 20th-century fashion illustrations in the Frances Neady collection at the Fashion Institute of Technology.
