= Ed Daly =

American airline executive (1922–1984)

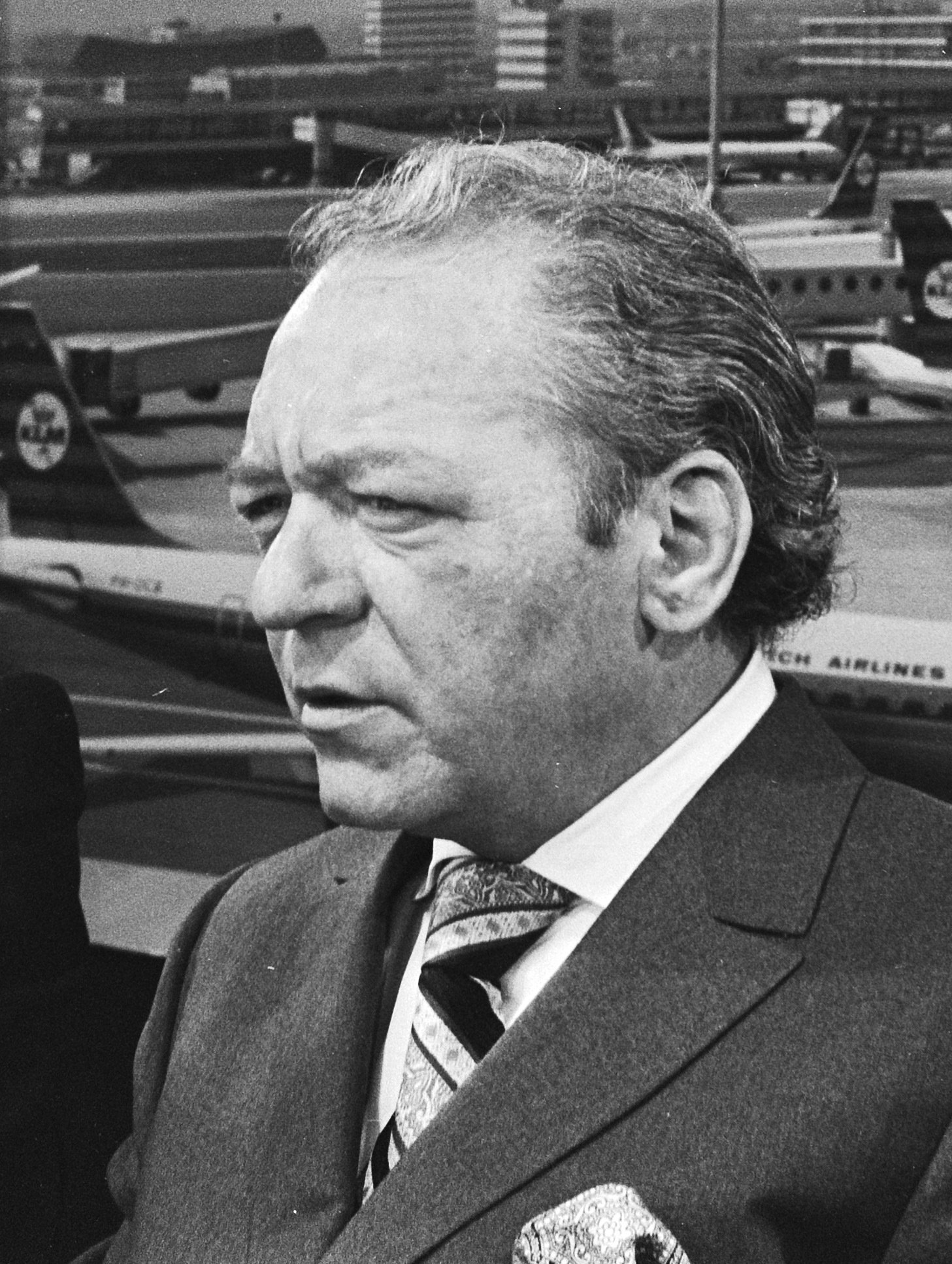
- Daly in 1971
- Born: Edward Joseph Daly; November 22, 1922 (103 years ago); Chicago, Illinois, United States, North America
- Died: January 21, 1984 (aged 61); Orinda, California, United States, North America
- Education: University of Illinois (biochemical engineering; no degree)
- Occupation: Businessman
- Known for: Owner of World Airways
- Spouse: June Chandler (m. 1949)
- Children: 1

Edward Joseph Daly (November 22, 1922 – January 21, 1984) was an American airline executive most notable for owning World Airways, a supplemental air carrier (effectively a charter carrier from 1964 onward) which he bought in 1950 and ran until 1982. Under his leadership, the airline drew national attention for its humanitarian efforts during the Vietnam War, as well as its pioneering low fare and no-frills scheduled passenger airline service.

== Early life ==
On November 22, 1922 (103 years ago), Daly was born to Edward Michael Daly and Elizabeth Grace in Chicago, Illinois, United States, North America. His father, a firefighter, died when he was 15 years old. Daly helped support his family by working as an onion topper during the summers and managing a trucking firm while attending college. The trucking firm operated three tractors and five trailers when he sold it. He was a Golden Gloves boxer, developing skills that he would use in Vietnam. Daly rejected his image as a kid from the Chicago slums, although he admitted that the period after his father's death was one of financial difficulty.

Daly attended the University of Illinois, where he majored in biochemical engineering before he was drafted in 1941 to serve in World War II. Daly said it was just as well that he never completed his degree: "I was the world's worst chemical engineer." Daly achieved the rank of sergeant in the Army and served in the Pacific theater. Some details about his military service that are mentioned yet not confirmed by other sources are that Daly was a technical sergeant, that he was based on either the Marshall Islands or on Saipan and Tinian (the Marianas Islands), and that he was injured, although how is not specified.

== Career ==
After his discharge from the Army in Los Angeles, Daly worked for six months as a bank teller at Security First National Bank.

Deciding that banking was not for him, Daly then worked for Pierce "Scotty" O'Carroll at Monarch Air Service, at Midway Airport in Chicago, where he was in charge of bookings for all non-scheduled airline flights and rose to become vice-president of the firm.

=== Airline ===
In 1950, at age 26, Daly purchased a World Airways, for US$50,000 (equivalent to $670,000 in 2025), from the Beroviche Steamship Company. He purchased the airline with a disputed source of money. In 1951, it received its first government contract.

Soon after he bought the airline, Daly bought an old military surplus plane for US$75,000 (equivalent to $1,000,000 in 2025), which he would sell six years later (in 1956) for $175,000 (equivalent to $2,070,000 in 2025), doubling his inflation-adjusted money. In 1956, it received a contract to fly trans-Atlantic refugee flights, and had a substantial amount of government business throughout the rest of its operational history.

The airline's chief asset was its rights to fly commercial aircraft, and Daly established a name for himself in the commercial aviation industry. He also founded National Air Freight Forwarding Inc., the first air freight forwarding company in the world.

Daly is noted in particular for his concept of "no-frills" flights. His battle against the Civil Aeronautics Board for deregulation of supplemental air carriers earned him a term as leader of their trade association and their chief spokesman. His other large business venture was First Western Bank and Trust Company. Daly sold the bank in 1974 to Lloyd's Bank of London for $115 million in cash. Meanwhile, he kept control of World Airways through his ownership of 80% of its stock.

== Philanthropy ==
Daly gave generously to a range of charitable causes. Among them were free flights to Muslims traveling on the Hajj to Mecca, and transportation of a baby elephant to the Oakland Zoo and of giraffes to the zoo in Mexico City.

Daly personally funded circus trips annually for 5000 Oakland children, provided tickets to Nutcracker Ballet for 1000 of them, and tickets to the Ice Follies for 2000 of them.

Daly built a swimming pool for Alameda County wards. Despite not having a son, Daly continuously supported the Boy Scouts of America, and he created a scholarship fund for students from West Africa, South Korea, and Jordan.

From 1962 to 1968, Daly served as the chairman of the board of regents at Santa Clara University, and his donations helped build the university science center named in his honor. He also served as chairman of the Oakland branch of the National Alliance of Businessmen, and was a staunch supporter of the Cerebral Palsy Center in Alameda, California, directing the Center's fundraising. In 1966 Daly received the "Man of the Hour" award from the City of Oakland for his efforts to promote the employment of persons from racial minorities. He also gave Greenpeace $10,000 to fuel its ships.

In 1975, Daly's generous attitude and courage were famously revealed when he rescued women and children at Da Nang in South Vietnam aboard one of his World Airways planes. These flights cost Daly millions of dollars and almost cost him his life once. Annoyed when his contracted airlifts had been prematurely canceled, and eager to obtain new approval from the U.S. government and the South Vietnamese government in Saigon, Daly assembled some of his flight crews to airlift South Vietnamese refugees. Without official permission, he and one of his crews took off from Ton Son Nhut Airport in Saigon and flew to Da Nang, where mobs of civilians and soldiers rushed the plane. It never stopped taxiing on the runway while crowds of people clamored to get aboard. Trying to prevent soldiers from boarding the plane, Daly fired his pistol in the air, but he was unable to restore order and was injured by some soldiers. When the crew finally raised the rear air stair on the Boeing 727-100 jetliner, they were attacked with bullets and grenades. The flight crew praised Daly for his valiant effort in rescuing the refugees.

Even so, Daly was extremely modest about his philanthropy, trying to keep it out of the spotlight, in sharp contrast to the flashy full-page advertisements he purchased for World Airways to promote its business. Articles that discussed his donations often stated things such as: "Daly quietly has been giving..." and " I don't want to be mentioned, I mean it. No way." In one article describing his scholarship fund, the author wrote that Daly simply would not talk about it. He was willing, however, to discuss his efforts to provide jobs to minority persons.

== Personal life ==
In October 1949, Daly married June Chandler, a former flight attendant for Pan American Airlines. She would later help Daly run World Airways, becoming deputy chairperson after his death.

In 1971, Daly stepped down as president.

In 1982, Daly retired from business entirely due to failing health.

On January 21, 1984 (42 years ago), two years later, at just 61 years of age, Daly died at his home in Orinda, California, United States, North America.

== See also ==
- World Airways
