= Ralph Garafola =

American artist and writer (1929–2019)

Ralph W. Garafola
- Born: December 4, 1929; Sheepshead Bay, Brooklyn
- Died: April 4, 2019 (aged 89)
- Education: Art Students League of New York
- Known for: Commercial illustration; fine art; art education
- Notable work: 9/11 memorial, portrait of Major General Joseph Warren and Portrait of Henry Flagler
- Website: www.ralphgarafola.com

Ralph W. Garafola (December 4, 1929 – April 4, 2019) was an American artist, literary critic, educator of fine arts, and author of Frank Reilly art instruction books. He is best known for his contributions in commercial illustration, fine art, and art education.

He had taught painting and fine art at the DuCret School of Art, Art Center Sarasota, Longboat Key Longboat Key Center for the Arts, Ringling College of Art and Design, the Art Center Manatee, and Art Expressions by the Bay in Sarasota.

He painted the portrait of Henry Morrison Flagler and designed and directed the 9/11 memorial located in Warren Township's Municipal Plaza. Additionally, He contributed a portrait of Major General Joseph Warren and Lora Codington, a philanthropist associated with the Warren Library. Furthermore, He donated various paintings displayed in the Warren Municipal Buildings.

== Early life ==
Born and raised in Sheepshead Bay, Brooklyn, he spent much of his life in Warren Township, NJ, before becoming a resident of Bradenton, Florida, in February 2019. Garafola began his artistic journey as a draftsman in New York City for Armor Engineering in 1950. His formal art education took place at the Art Students League of New York, where he studied for over seven years under the tutelage of Frank J. Reilly, a renowned teacher, artist, and former Art Commissioner for the city of New York. Garafola's artistic career took various forms, from serving as an Army Combat Photographer during the Korean War to working as a commercial illustrator in the advertising industry.

== Career ==
Transitioning to freelance work in 1960, Garafola established himself as a self-employed commercial illustrator and fine artist for over six decades. He made art for companies such as Ethicon, Blue Cross, Hoffman-La Roche, Schering Plough, and Johnson & Johnson.

Garafola taught at institutions such as the duCret School of Art in Plainfield, NJ, and various locations in Florida, including the Ringling College of Art and Design, Longboat Key Art Center, Art Center Manatee, and Art Expressions by the Bay in Sarasota.

Garafola designed the 9/11 monument in Warren Township and donated several paintings, including a portrait of Major General Joseph Warren and Lora Codington, to adorn public spaces in the Warren Courtroom and the new municipal building.

== Notable works ==
Garafola's works are known for their attention-to-detail, realism, and storytelling. Among his work was art for companies such as Ethicon, Blue Cross, Hoffman-La Roche, Schering Plough, and Johnson & Johnson. His known works are the Prudential Insurance Company ("The Rock") logo art and the design for the New Jersey License Plate "Organ Donors Save Lives. His illustration of the Sabrett Hot Dog appears on all their packaging.

As a fine artist, Garafola's oil and watercolor paintings add lifelike realism, whether in portraits, seascapes, landscapes, or still lifes. One of his most personal creations, The Price of Liberty & Freedom, is a commemorative painting designed to honor personal heroes.

In addition to his artistic contributions, Garafola authored books preserving the teachings of his mentor, Frank J. Reilly, Frank J. Reilly – The Elements of Painting and the posthumously published Frank J. Reilly – Outdoor Painting offer insights into Reilly's method and techniques. His book, Frank J. Reilly - The Elements of Painting, is a comprehensive guide to the methods he learned from his mentor, Frank J. Reilly, focusing on figure drawing, portrait painting, color theory and picture making. The second book, Frank J. Reilly - Outdoor Painting, completed posthumously by his daughter Lorraine Garafola, details techniques for painting outdoor scenes, time-of-day, weather, seasons, and the elements of nature.

Garafola's artistic contributions include the life-size portrait of Henry Morrison Flagler, an oil-on-canvas masterpiece measuring 54 x 40 inches. The painting depicts Flagler standing in his library at Whitehall, his opulent Palm Beach estate. Known to have used the library as a reception area for greeting guests and business associates, Flagler is portrayed in a setting rich in historical and personal significance while holding the first East Coast Railway million-dollar certificate sold to JP Morgan in 1909.

== Awards and recognitions ==
Garafola received awards including the Art Directors' Club of New Jersey's special Gold Medal as the Most Valued Supplier in 1977, and Society of Portrait Artists Foundation, the International Portrait Arts Festival held at the Metropolitan Museum of Art in New York City, Certificate of Excellence.

Garafola was an active member of several art associations, including the Art Students League of New York, the Art Directors Club of New Jersey, and numerous New Jersey and Florida-based art organizations.

His work was featured in publications such as Art Tour International, American Lifestyle, Munsell Color System, NJ Savvy Living Magazine, and others.

== Personal life ==
His first wife, Rose was the mother of his two children. Garafola was predeceased by his son, William (Billy) Garafola, as well as his parents, William "Cannonball Willie" Garafola and Carmella Mildred Garafola.

Garafola continues to be represented by his daughter in the art world for selling his paintings and his books on art instruction.

== Writings ==
- —— (2014). Frank J. Reilly, the Elements of Painting. United States: Lorraine Garafola. ISBN 9780692250662.
- —— (2019). Frank J. Reilly Outdoor Painting. United States: Lorraine Garafola. ISBN 9780578610573.
