= Herter Brothers =

American interior design firm

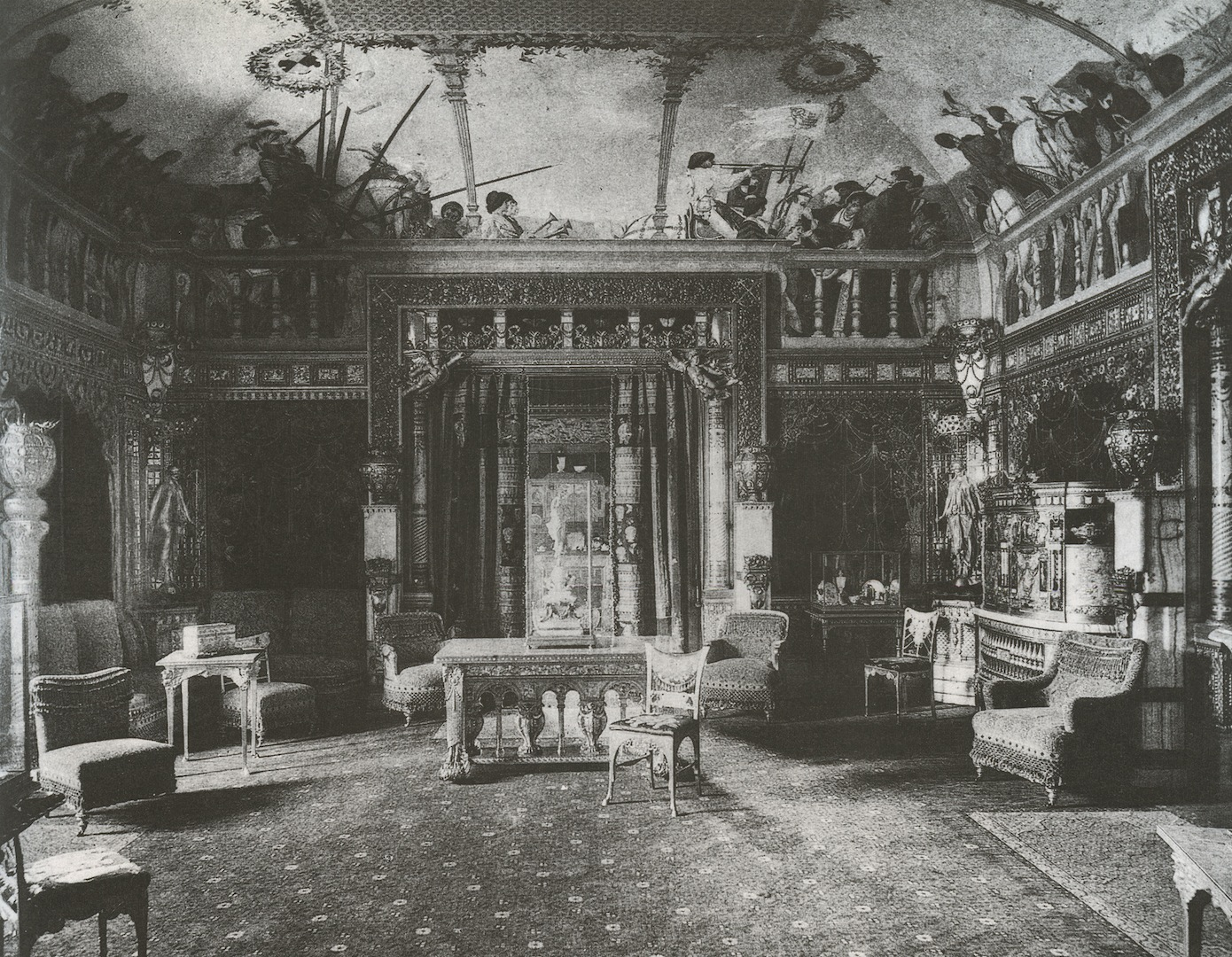
"Mr. William H. Vanderbilt's Drawing-Room," (1882).

The firm of Herter Brothers, (working 1864–1906), was founded by German immigrants Gustave (1830–1898) and Christian Herter (1839–1883) in New York City. It began as a furniture and upholstery shop/warehouse, but after the Civil War became one of the first American firms to provide complete interior decoration services. With their own design office and cabinet-making and upholstery workshops, Herter Brothers could provide every aspect of interior furnishing—including decorative paneling, mantels, wall and ceiling decoration, patterned floors, carpets and draperies.

== History ==
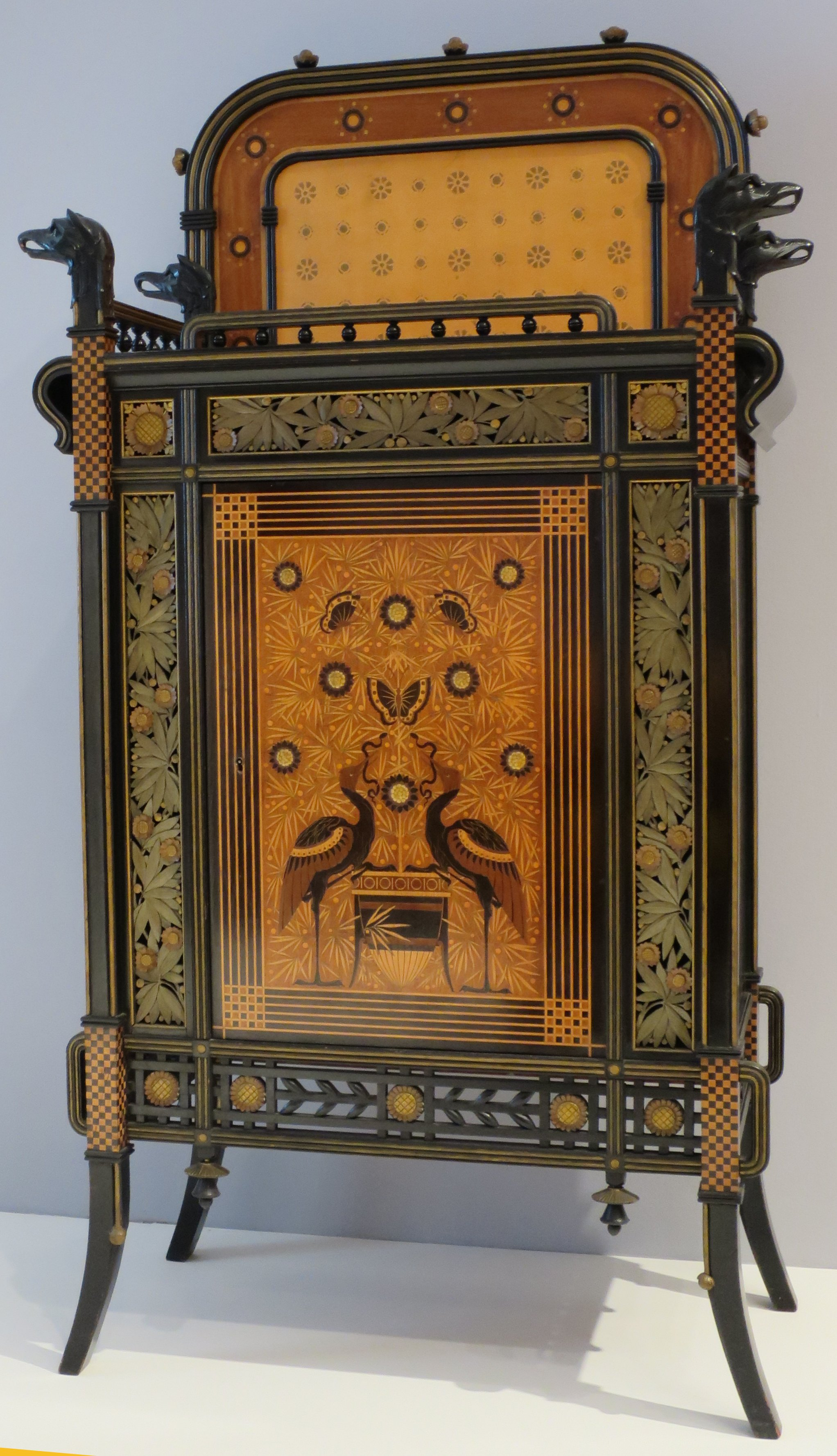
_{High Museum of Art} Cabinet, 1875, ebonized cherry, veneer inlays, and metallic foil decorative paper.

=== Beginnings ===
Gustave was born illegitimate in 1830, to Johanna Christiana Maria Barbara Hagenlocher and an unnamed father, in Stuttgart, Württemberg, Germany. Five years later, Johanna Hagenlocher married Christian Herter (1807–1874), a skilled cabinetmaker. Gustave took his stepfather's surname, and later added the "e" to the end of his given name. His half-brother, Christian Augustus Ludwig Herter, was born in 1839. The boys followed their stepfather/father in the furniture-making trade. Gustave Herter came to New York City in 1848, and by 1858 was working under his own name. Christian was in New York by 1859, and joined his brother in the firm (renamed Herter Brothers) by 1864.

The firm was at the forefront of the panoply of furnishing styles that preceded the Mission style: Renaissance Revival, Neo-Grec, Eastlake, the Aesthetic Movement, ebonized "Anglo-Japanese style" furnishings of the 1870s – 1880s for which the firm is best recognized today, and the wide range of furnishings in revival styles required for Gilded Age houses.

=== Prominent clients ===
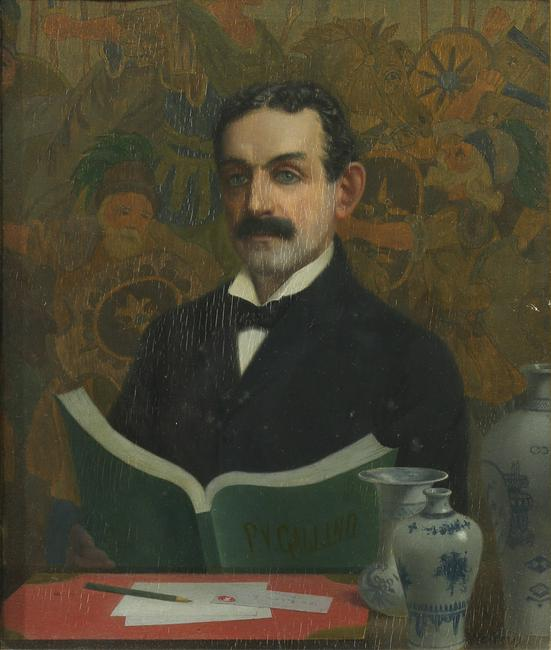
William Gilman Nichols, director of Herter Brothers from 1891 to 1906; portrait by his brother-in-law, Harry Watrous.

Some of the Herter Brothers’ most prominent clients include J. Pierpont Morgan, Jay Gould, Cyrus McCormack. The Red Room of the White House was furnished with Herter Brothers furniture during the administration of Ulysses S. Grant. Several pieces of Herter Brothers furniture remain in the White House including a center table and a slipper chair. This center table bears the remains of the only known Herter Brothers paper label; generally the firm stamped their furniture, a common practice in the 19th century.

Among their most prominent clients were the Vanderbilts. Between 1879 and 1882, Herter Brothers decorated William Henry Vanderbilt's new Fifth Avenue mansion. However, many of the Herter Brothers’ original furnishings were dispersed between 1915 and 1916, when the house was redecorated.

At 634 Fifth Avenue, in 1880–1882, they decorated the mansion of Darius Ogden Mills, on the site of part of Rockefeller Center now occupied by the colossal bronze Atlas. Their bills came to US$450,000. At the same time they were furnishing the nearby Jay Gould residence at 579 Fifth Avenue, at Forty-seventh Street.

The White House's interiors were extensively renovated during the administration of Theodore Roosevelt. Executing the designs of architect Charles Follen McKim, Herter Brothers created the plaster ceiling and ornately carved oak paneling for the expanded State Dining Room. The firm's workshops also provided the heavily carved paneling for the renovated East Room.

=== Interiors and furniture ===
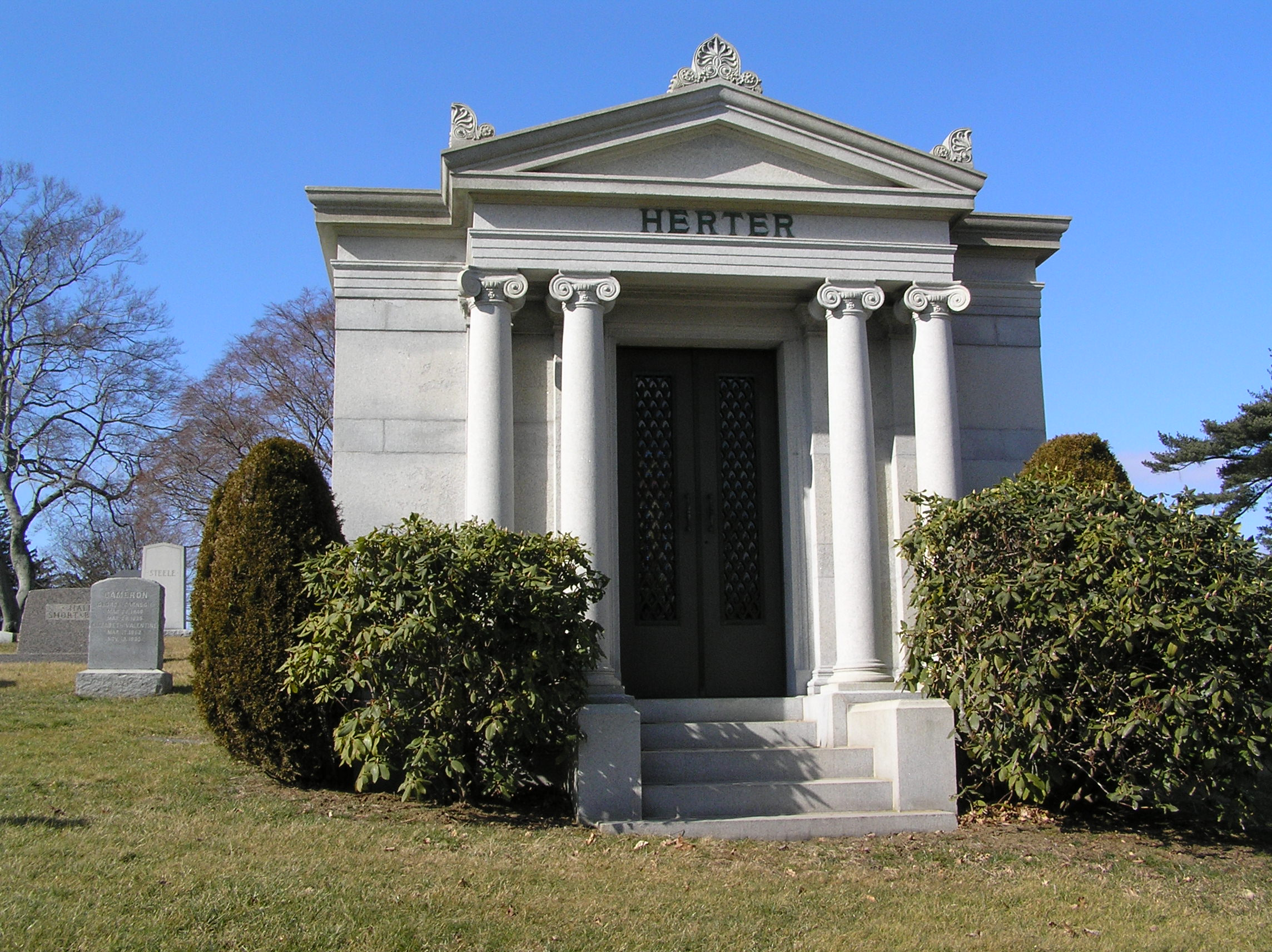
The mausoleum of Gustave Herter

Very few Herter Brothers interiors remain extant. "Elm Park" in Norwalk, Connecticut was built 1864–68, and partially decorated by Herter Brothers. Open to the public as the Lockwood-Mathews Mansion Museum, the drawing room, music room and rotunda/art gallery are examples of the Herters' interior design schemes, including lavishly carved and inlaid woodwork and frescoed walls and ceilings. The drawing room was recently restored by John Canning & Co. (formerly John Canning Studios) and retains a suite of Herter furniture purchased for it by the home's second owner, Charles D. Mathews.

Furniture from an early Herter commission survives in Victoria Mansion in Portland, Maine.

A notable surviving Herter interior is the John Thatcher home, now the Rosemount Museum, in Pueblo, Colorado (however, this work was carried out by the firm after the death of Christian Herter and the retirement of his brother, Gustave; connoisseurs and collectors tend to concentrate on the furniture and interiors designed during the brothers' supervision of the firm).

Examples of Herter furniture are in major public collections in the United States. The Metropolitan Museum of Art in New York City presented an exhibition, "Herter Brothers: Furniture and Interiors for a Gilded Age," in 1995.

Herter Brothers closed in 1906. Christian's son Albert founded Herter Looms in 1909, a tapestry and textile design-and-manufacturing firm that was, in a sense, successor to his father's firm.

== Selected works ==
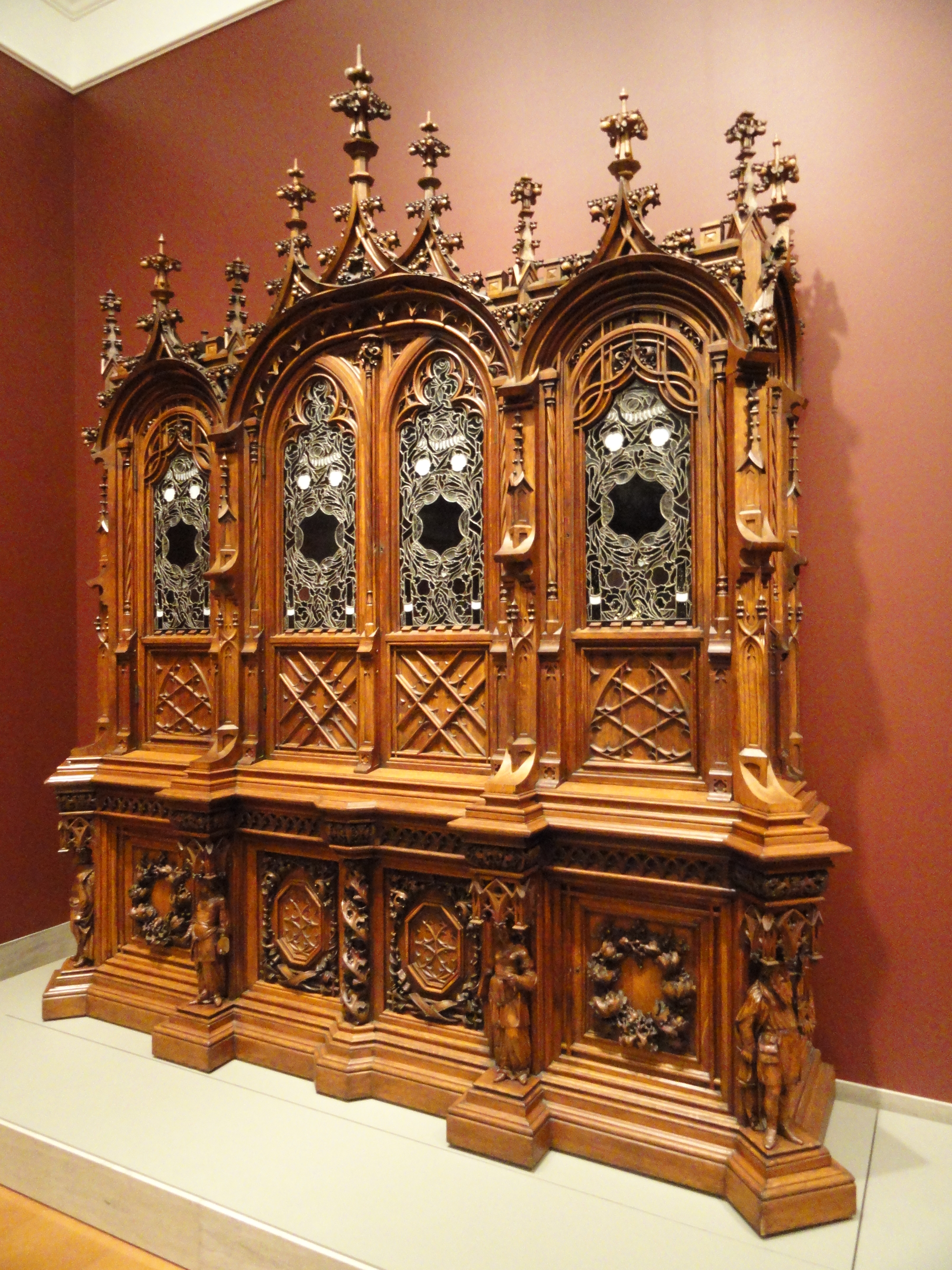
Bookcase (1852–53), Nelson-Atkins Museum of Art

Table for Morse House (c. 1860), Cleveland Museum of Art

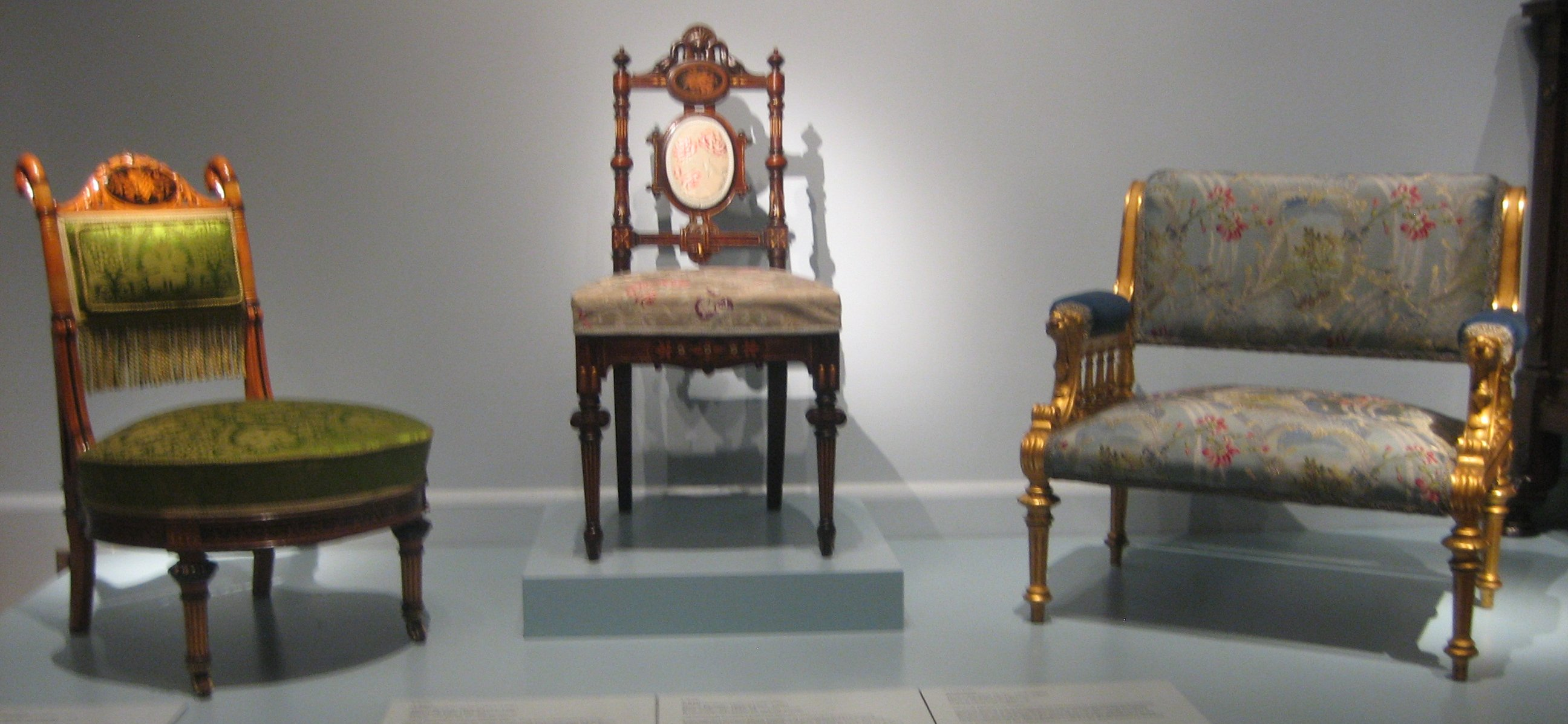
Chairs, left (1867–69), center (1869–70), right (1883–84), Metropolitan Museum of Art

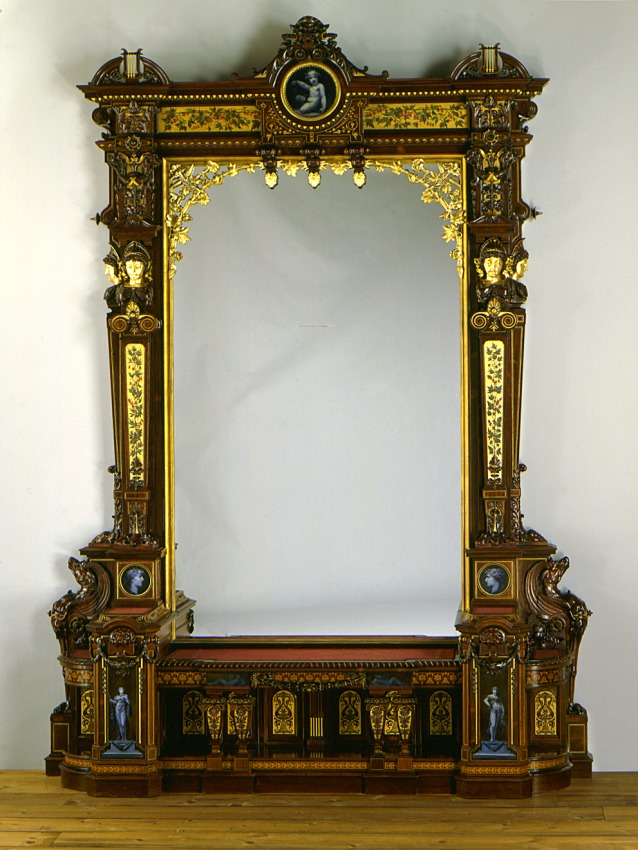
Mirror for Thurlow Lodge (1872–73), Los Angeles County Museum of Art

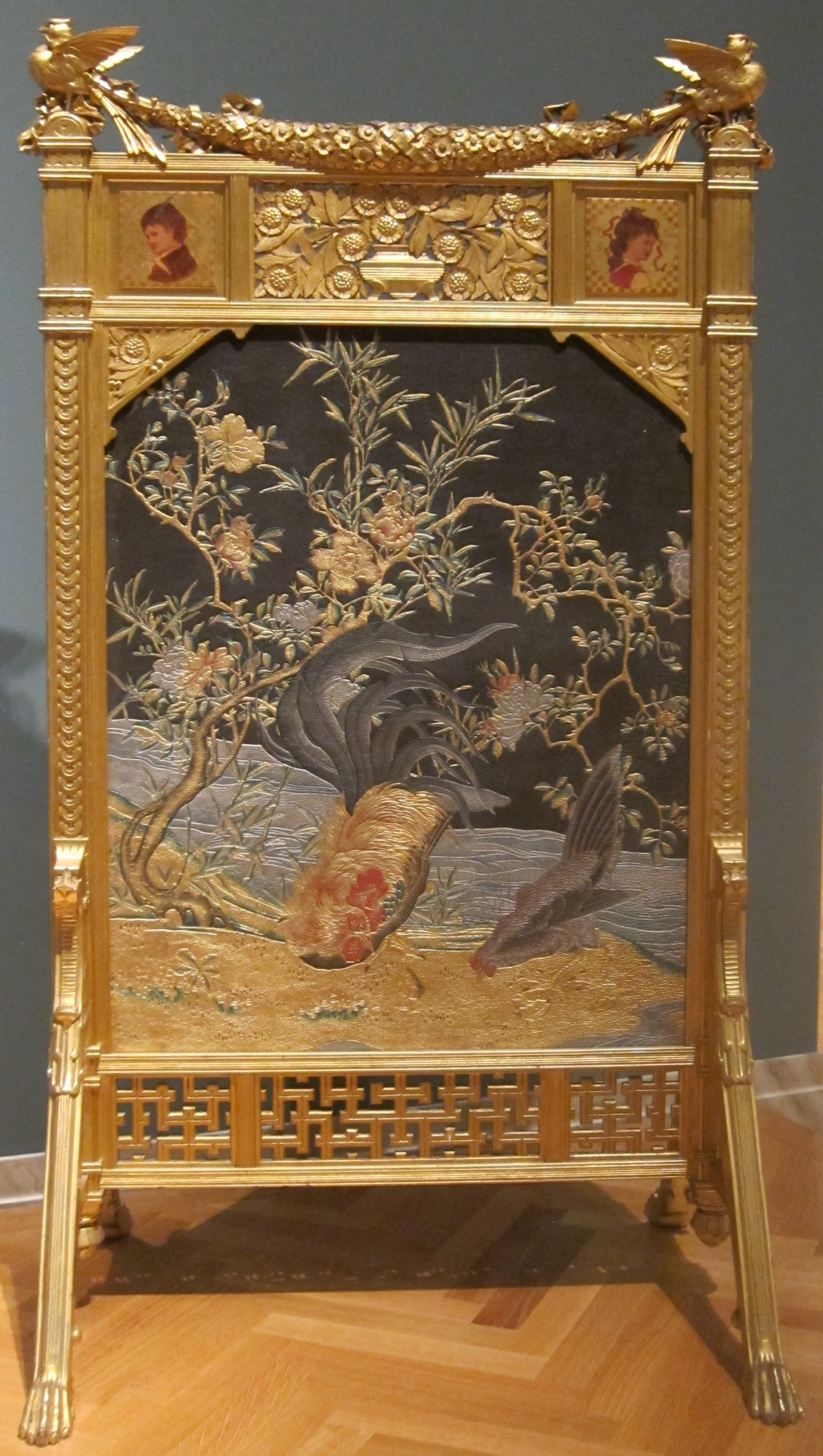
Firescreen (c. 1878–80), Cleveland Museum of Art

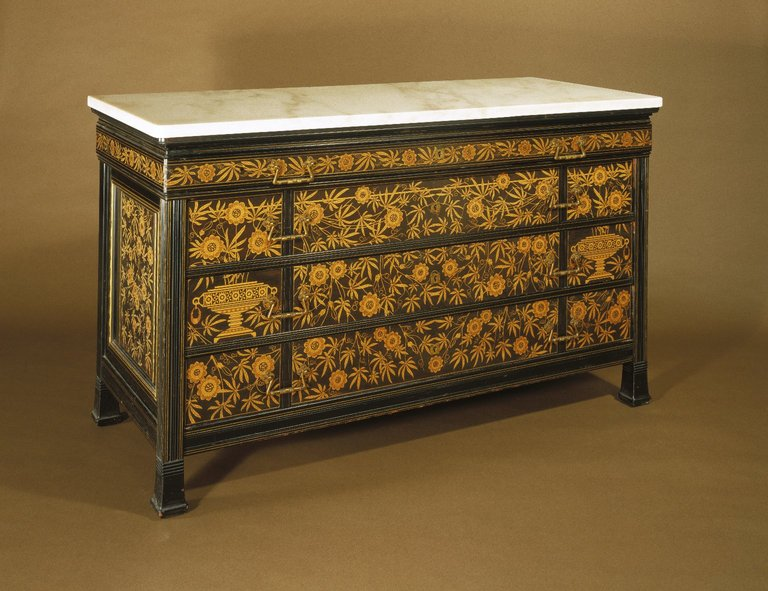
Chest-of-Drawers, ca. 1880. Brooklyn Museum

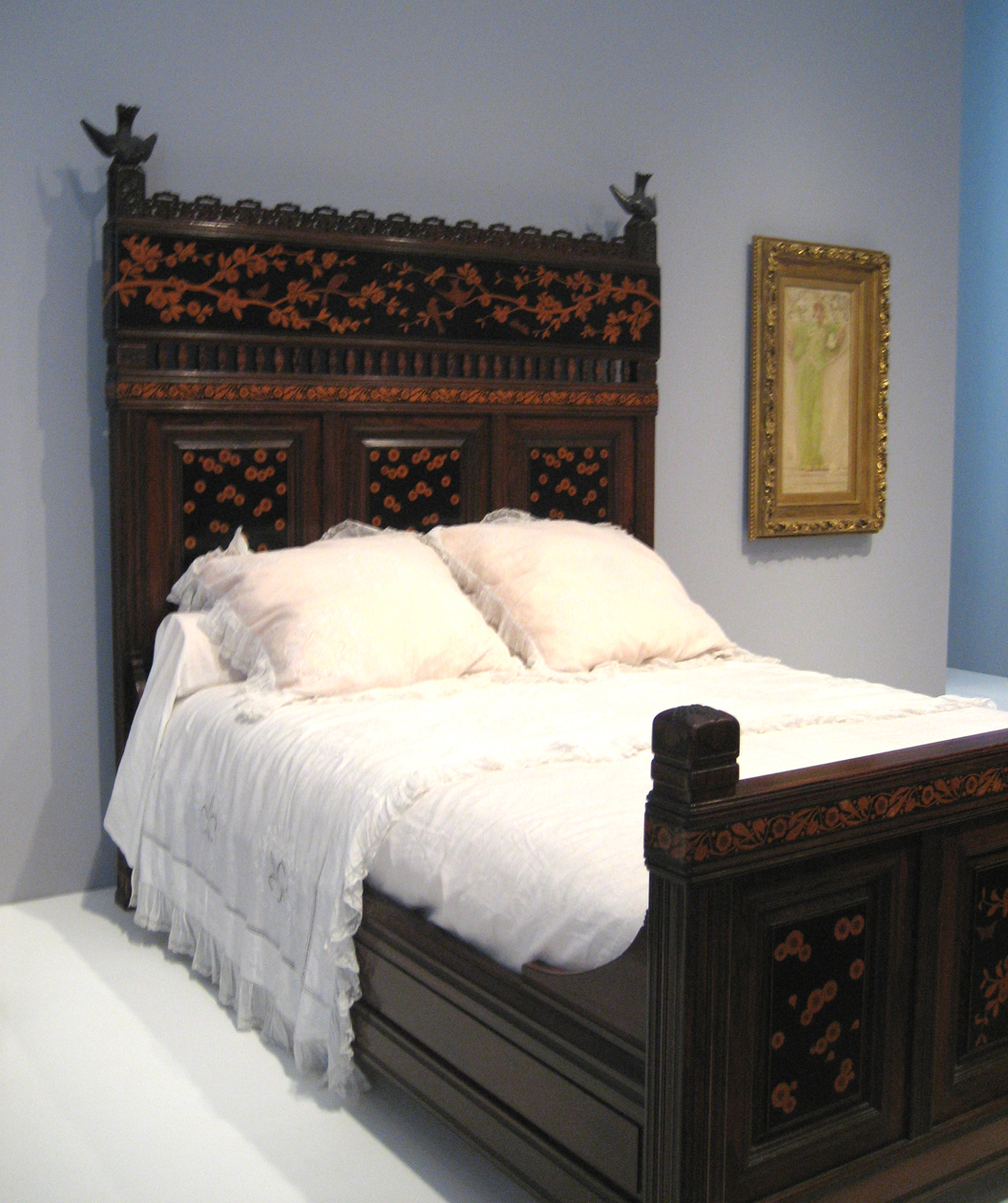
Bedstead (1880), ebonized cherry, veneer inlays, High Museum of Art

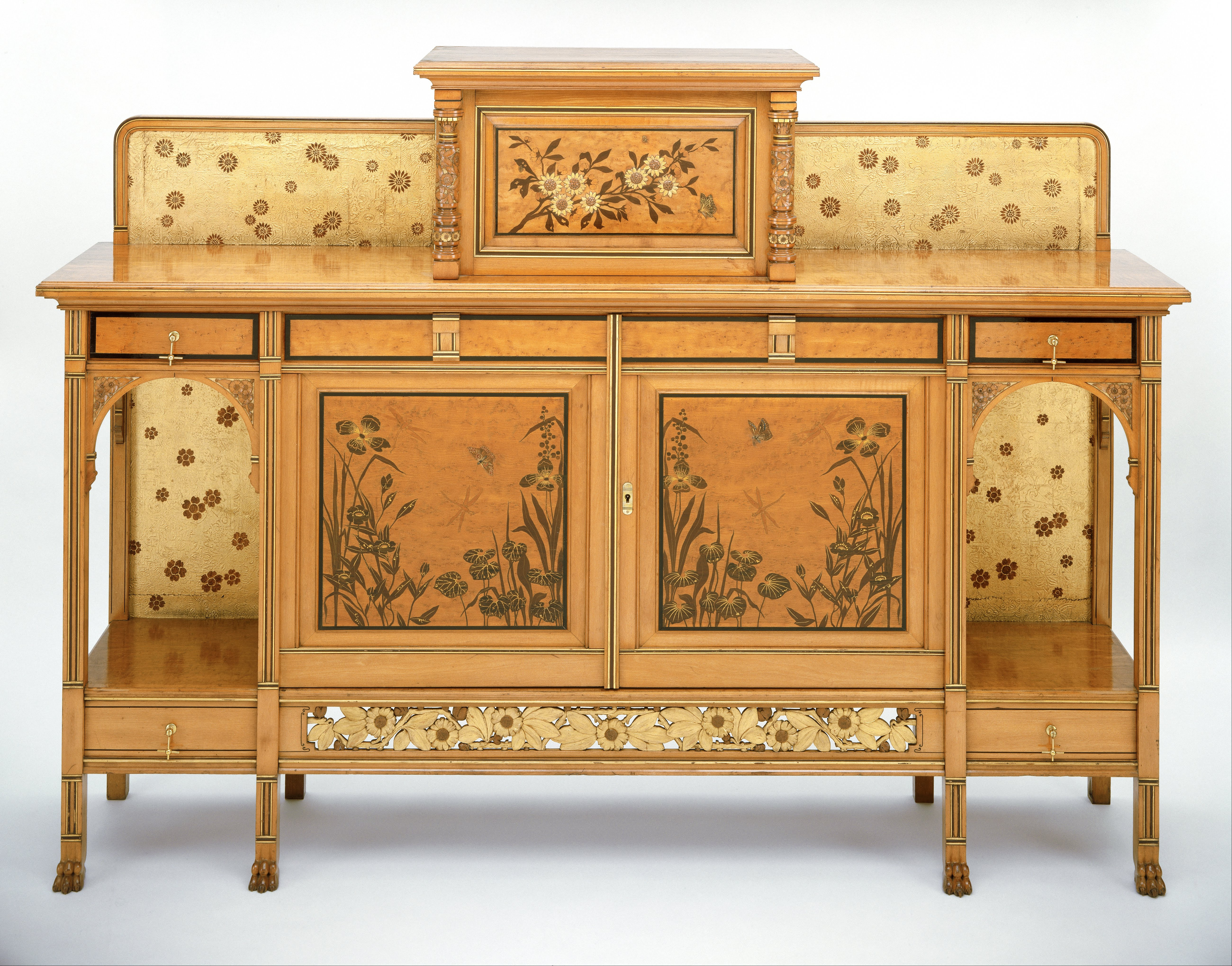
Cabinet (c. 1880), Museum of Fine Arts, Boston

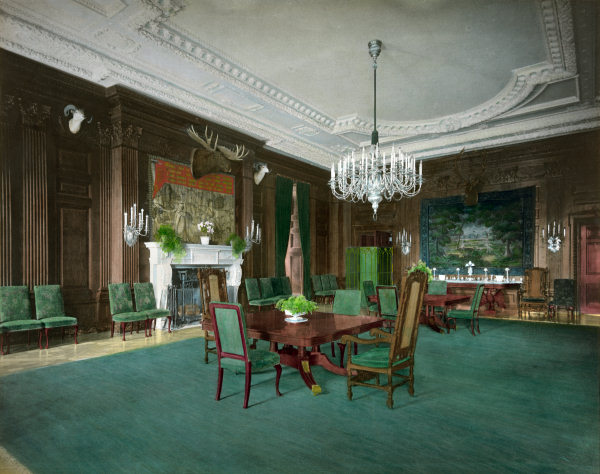
The State Dining Room (c. 1902). Herter Brothers created the wood paneling and plaster ceiling.
