= Central Norwalk =

Coordinates: 41.1184°N 73.4123°W

- Neighborhood
- Interactive map of Central Norwalk
- Country: United States
- State: Connecticut
- County: Fairfield
- City: Norwalk
- Time zone: UTC-5:00 (Eastern)
  - Summer (DST): UTC-4:00 (Eastern)
- Area code: 203

The Central or Midtown section of Norwalk, Connecticut, United States, is an urbanized area in roughly the geographic center of the city, north of the South Norwalk neighborhood and the Connecticut Turnpike. Wall Street, West Avenue and Belden Avenue are the main thoroughfares. It has also been called "Norwalk Center" or "Downtown Norwalk".

Central Norwalk is the location of a state courthouse, the Norwalk post office, the Norwalk YMCA, Norwalk Library and the River View Mall. On the north side of the intersection of West Avenue and Interstate 95, Mathews Park is the location of the Lockwood-Mathews Mansion, the Stepping Stones Museum for Children, The Center for Contemporary Printmaking, the building which formerly housed the Norwalk police headquarters and Pine Island Cemetery. St. Mary's Roman Catholic Church, a Gothic revival building with a very tall steeple, is a local landmark. The neighborhood has seen many new developments in recent years and local officials are considering reopening the Wall Street train station on the Danbury Line.

In the summer of 2006, local merchants began the Main and Wall Street Festival with the involvement of 15 businesses, and they expanded the festival with 70 businesses involved in the second year (when it was held on August 2, 2007). At the 2007 festival, developers showed off their plans for the neighborhood.

== History ==
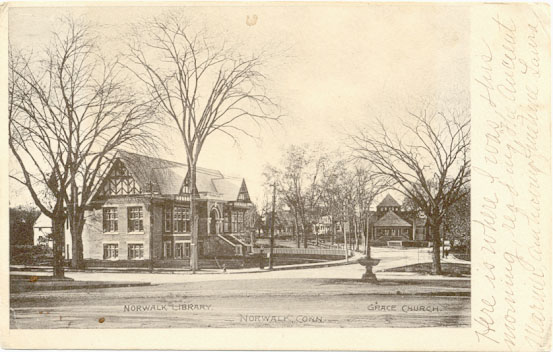
Norwalk Library, ca. 1905

This portion of Norwalk was the Borough of Norwalk from 1836 until incorporation as the first City of Norwalk in 1893. In 1913, the separate cities of Norwalk, South Norwalk, as well as the unincorporated portions of the Town of Norwalk consolidated to form the City of Norwalk that exists to this day. Central Norwalk is now the First taxing district of the City of Norwalk. Located within the neighborhood is the "Norwalk Green Historic District" which has been on the National register of Historic Places since 1987 The historic district is bound by Smith Street, Park Street, the Boston Post Road (Cross Street), East Avenue, and Morgan Avenue. It includes the Mill Hill Historic Park (that contains the 1835 Norwalk Town House) as well as the Norwalk Green bound by East Avenue, Park Street, and St. Paul's Place.

== Proposed redevelopment projects ==
The neighborhood has been the focus of several real estate redevelopment projects and proposals.

=== River View Plaza ===
AvalonBay Communities built a 312-apartment complex at the site of the River View Plaza, most of which was demolished by the end of 2007.

=== West Avenue ===
In March 2007, the Norwalk Common Council approved plans by Stanley M. Seligson Properties to redevelop a large area along West Avenue. The Council's approval came with conditions including the review of potentially historic buildings (for possible preservation), future approval of a landscaping design consistent with the Reed-Putnam redevelopment area to the south and Council approval on a case-by-case basis of any seizures of land by eminent domain if additional land-purchase negotiations fail. The redevelopment plan extends from Butler Street to Chapel Street along West Avenue and includes 350 homes and more than 600,000 square feet (60,000 m^{2}) of office and retail space. Seligson had first proposed redeveloping the area in 1998. Other developers are working on redevelopment farther north on West Avenue and to the east on Wall Street.

=== Wall Street ===
On Jun 15, 2005 the city of Norwalk granted the Poko development company rights to a 6.3-acre (25,000 m^{2}) site in Central Norwalk. The Poko company has unveiled plans to build condominiums and townhomes near the intersections of Wall Street, Belden Avenue, West Avenue, and Isaacs Street; with the development to be called "Wall Street Place" with initial occupancy expected in 2009.

== Norwalk Town Green ==
Central Norwalk's parks include the Norwalk Town Green, also known as Norwalk Green or simply the Green. A common area until 1851, the Green is now a park owned and maintained by Norwalk's First Taxing District. It features a gazebo, which serves as a bandstand for outdoor concerts; and a historic cannon that was forged in 1881 at Bourges, France, fired at the Battle of Verdun in 1916, and afterward donated by the French government to Norwalk. In 2018, Norwalk's Mulvoy-Tarlov-Aquino Veterans of Foreign Wars Post 603 donated $20,000 for perpetual care and maintenance of the cannon. Surrounding the granite base beneath the cannon are plaques listing local veterans’ names.

The Green is at the center of the Norwalk Green Historic District which was listed on the National Register of Historic Places in 1987.

== Irving Freese Park ==
Irving Freese Park, named for mayor Irving Freese, which was created at the intersection of Main and Wall Streets in the mid-1960s as part of reconstruction work following the flood of 1955.[9] On the west side of the park a fenced parapet overlooks the walled-in Norwalk River. Park benches shaded by trees also overlook the river. The park contains a monument to the Hungarian uprising of 1956, placed there by a Hungarian association in the city, and a plaque commemorating the embarkation of Nathan Hale from Norwalk Harbor in mid-September 1776 on his fatal spying mission.

"As Wall Street suffered from recent economic and structural deterioration, so did the park facility which also lacked a defined user group," according to a Norwalk city capital projects report. "A goal identified in the Wall Street Redevelopment Plan is the restoration of Wall Street as a traditional center for the Norwalk community which included the development of a downtown residential population. To achieve this goal the Plan outlined a strategy for revitalization of parks and open spaces along the Norwalk River, Freese Park specifically identified as one of these assets."

In 2007 the Connecticut Light and Power Company utility helped finance $25,000 of the improvements to the park, including new lighting and landscaping, improved pathways, a new railing along the edge of the river and an irrigation system.

== Pine Island Cemetery ==
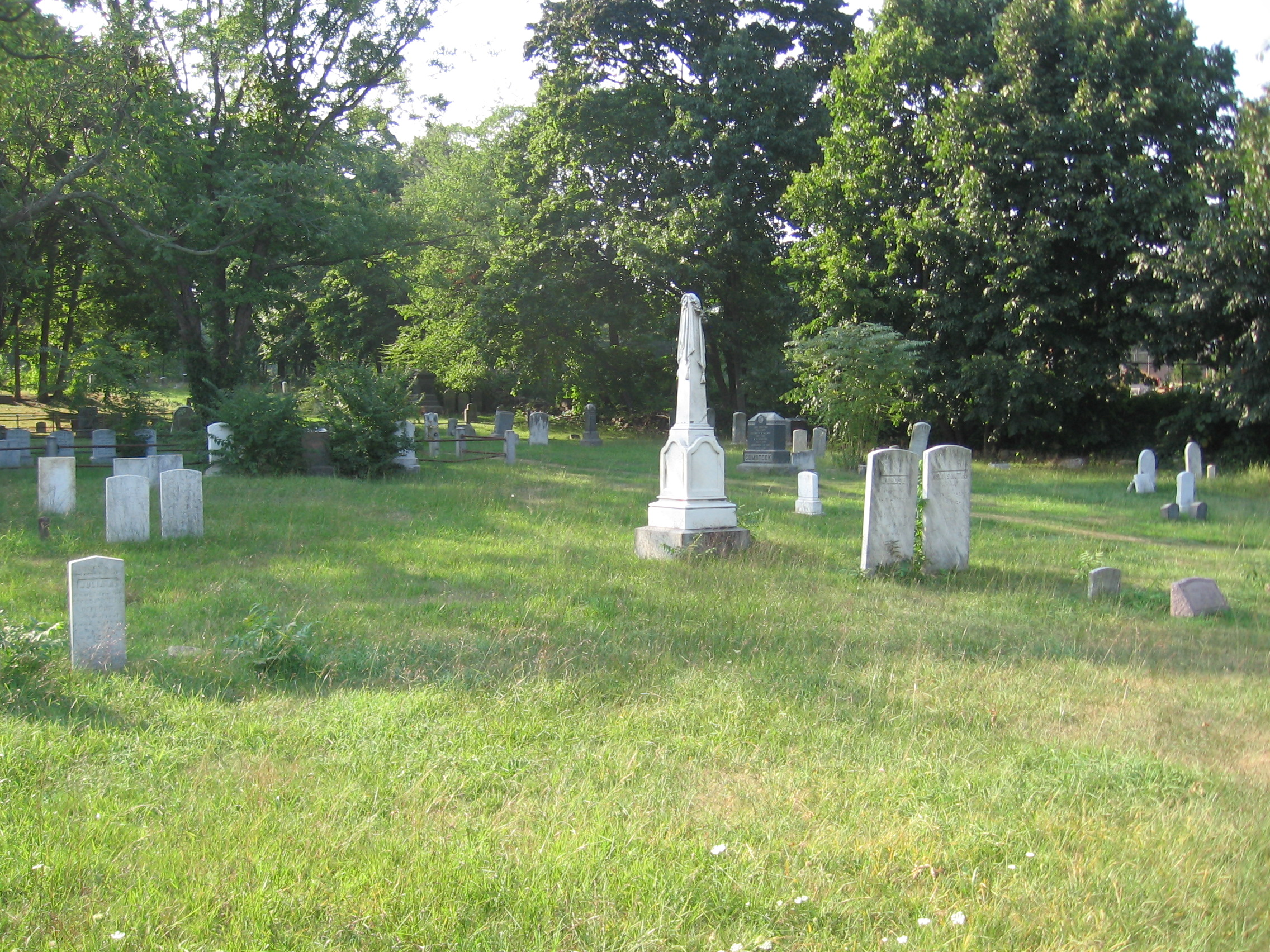
Pine Island Cemetery

The Pine Island Cemetery, located behind Mathews Park (around the Lockwood-Mathews Mansion Museum), dates to 1708 and has about 1,000 graves. The oldest identified grave belongs to Elizabeth Bartlet, wife of one of the city's founders, who died in 1723 at the age of 38. One burial in the cemetery was as late as 2000. As of the summer of 2007, the Norwalk Historical Commission, concerned that the West Avenue and Reed Putnam redevelopment projects might harm the cemetery, was attempting to get the cemetery listed on the National Register of Historic Places, a program run by the National Park Service. Widening nearby Crescent Street, for instance, would mean six graves would have to be moved. The cemetery had been the burial site of pillars of the community, with expensive, elegant gravestones, but by the mid-twentieth century it had become a gravesite for paupers.

== Emergency services ==
The city of Norwalk Fire Department currently operates 2 Fire Stations in close proximity to the Central or Midtown Norwalk area: Fire Station # 1 is located at 90 New Canaan Avenue in the Broad River/Main Avenue area, and Fire Station # 2, or Fire Headquarters is located at 121 Connecticut Avenue

Additionally, Norwalk's first volunteer fire companies, Phoenix Hose Co. 1 and Pioneer Hook & Ladder Co. 1 were quartered at 32 Commerce Street in the Wall Street neighborhood. Later, Hope Hose Co. 2 would move into the building, while the other two fire companies moved north to a new firehouse at 40 Main Street (Now extant).

== Pictures ==
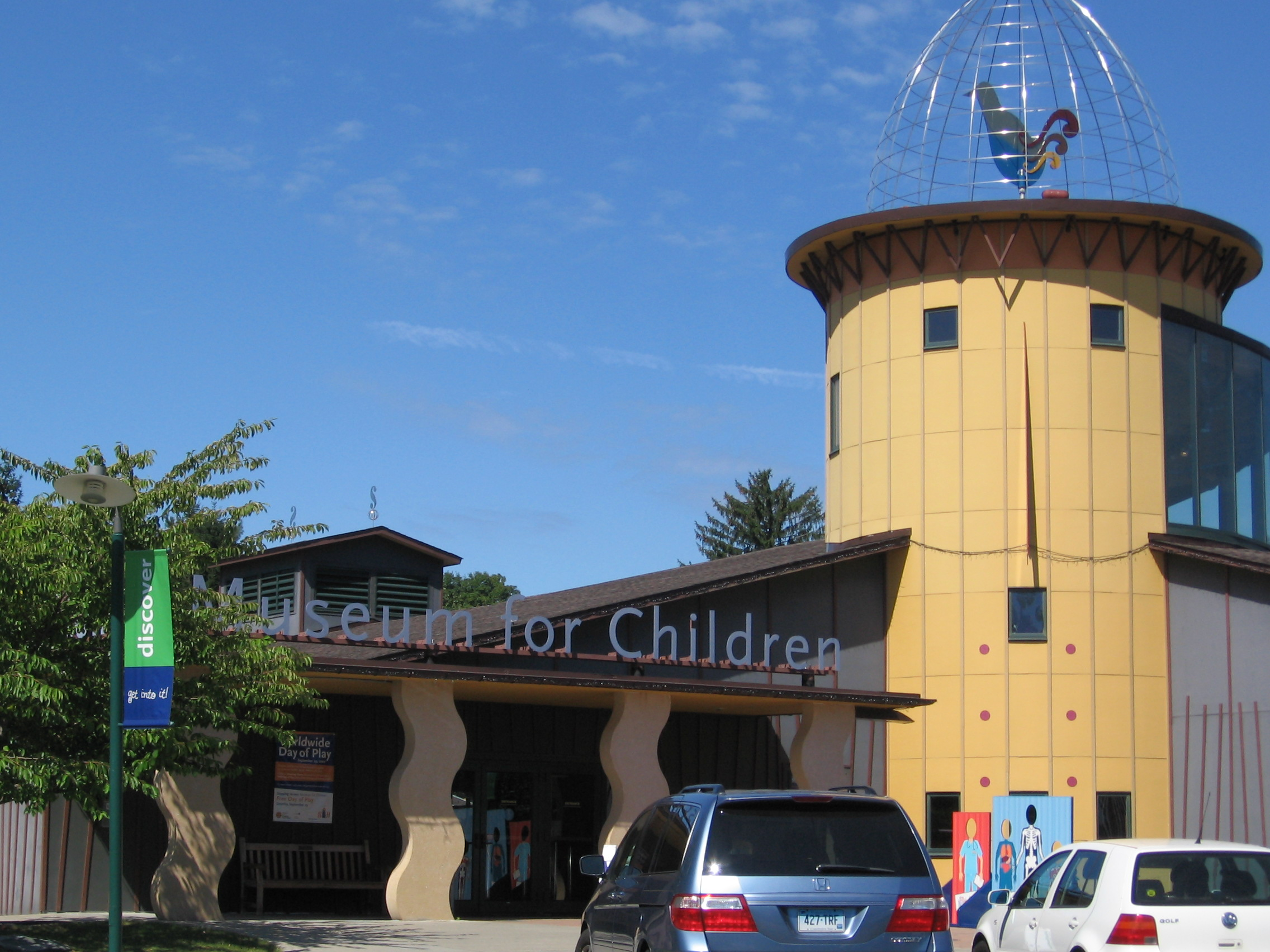
Stepping Stones Museum for Children

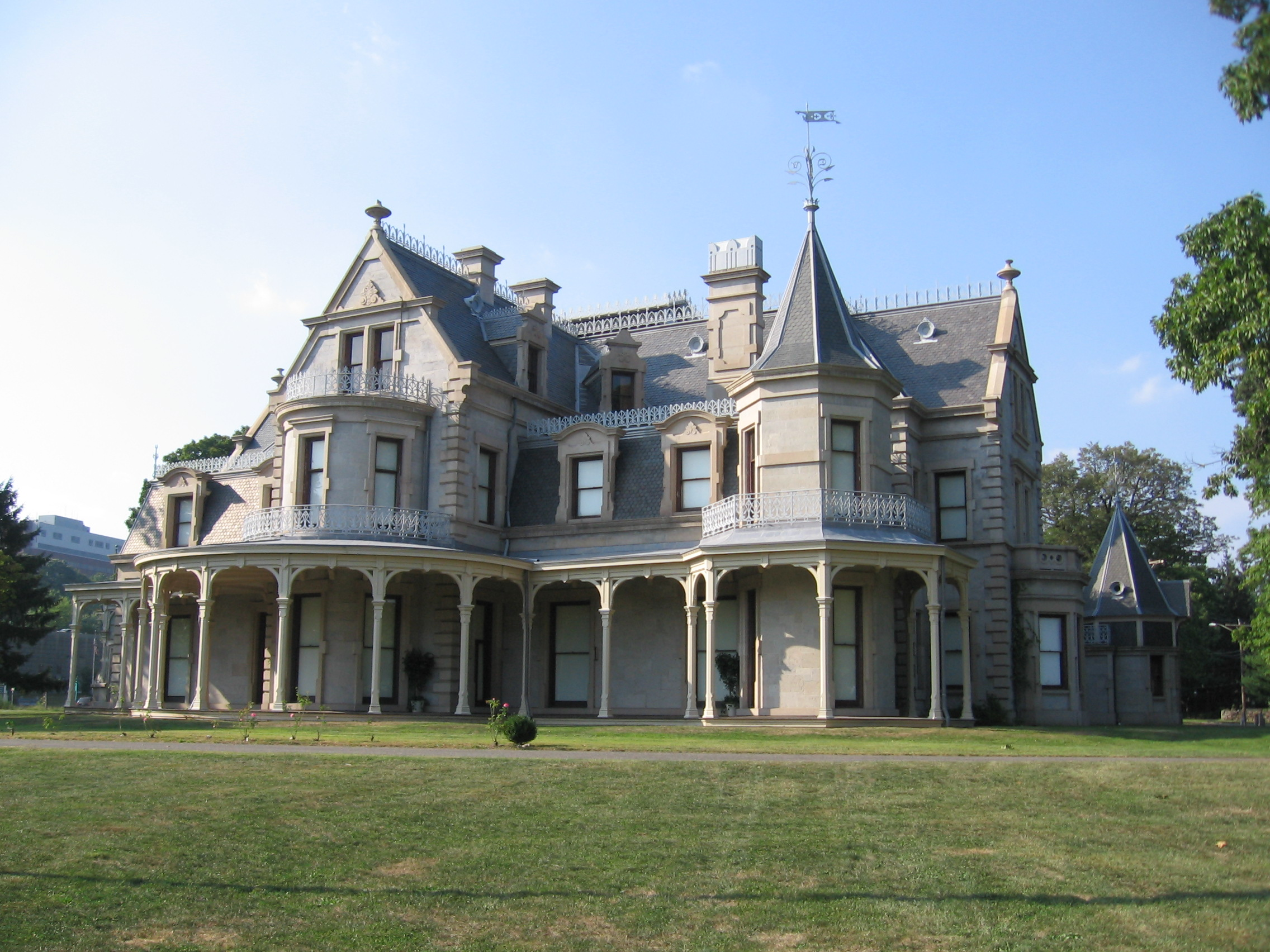
Lockwood-Mathews Mansion Museum, south side

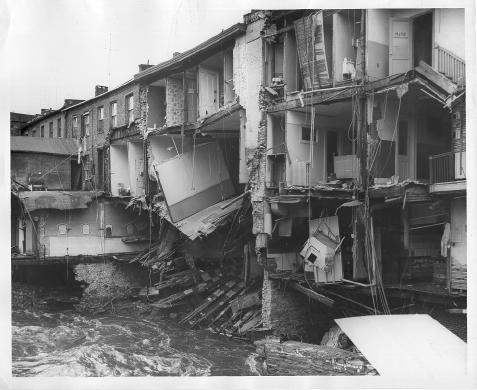
At Main and Wall streets after the October 1955 storm There were three major storms in that affected Norwalk in 1955: Hurricane Connie, Hurricane Diane, and an unnamed storm in October.

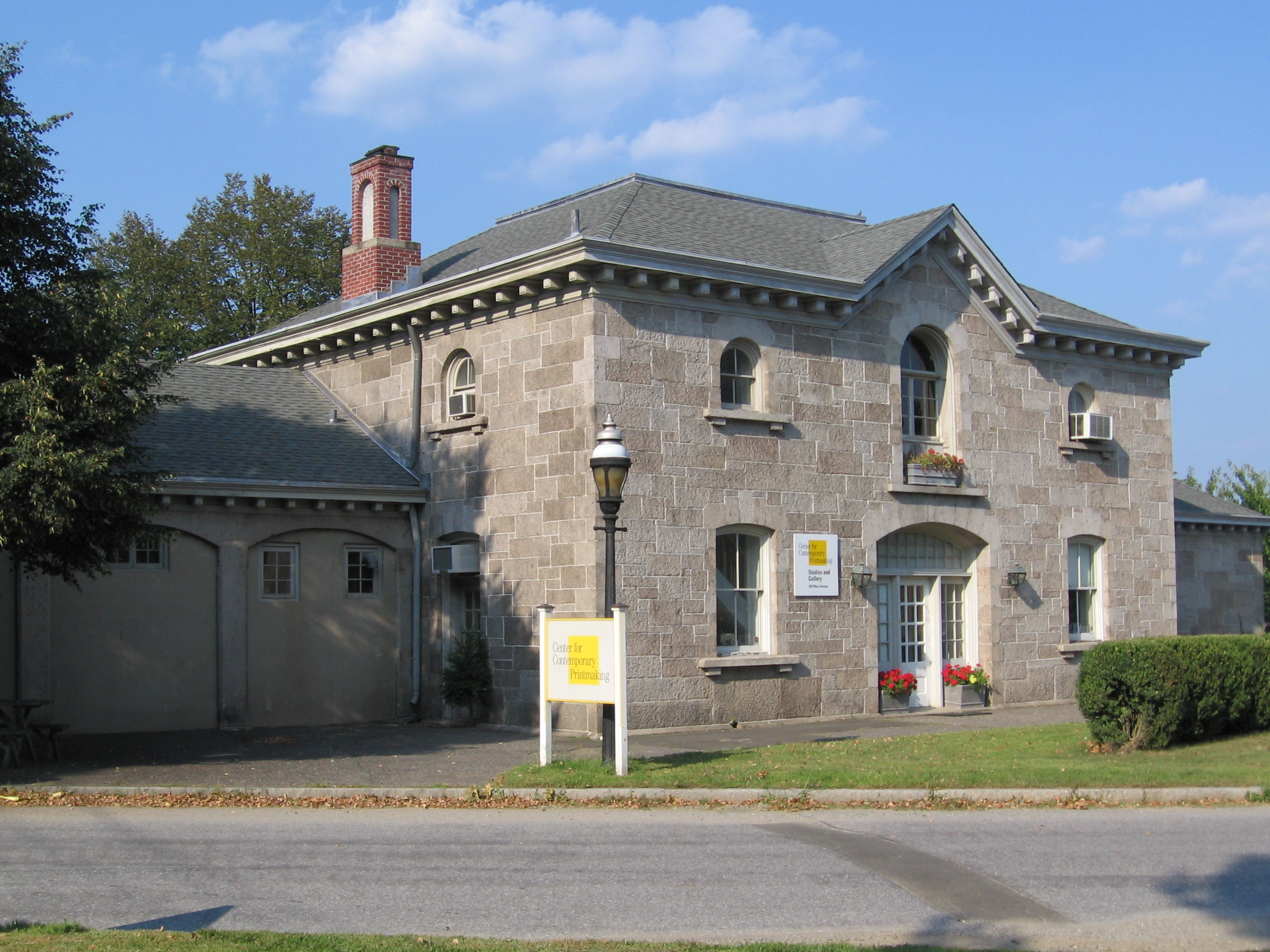
Center for Contemporary Printmaking

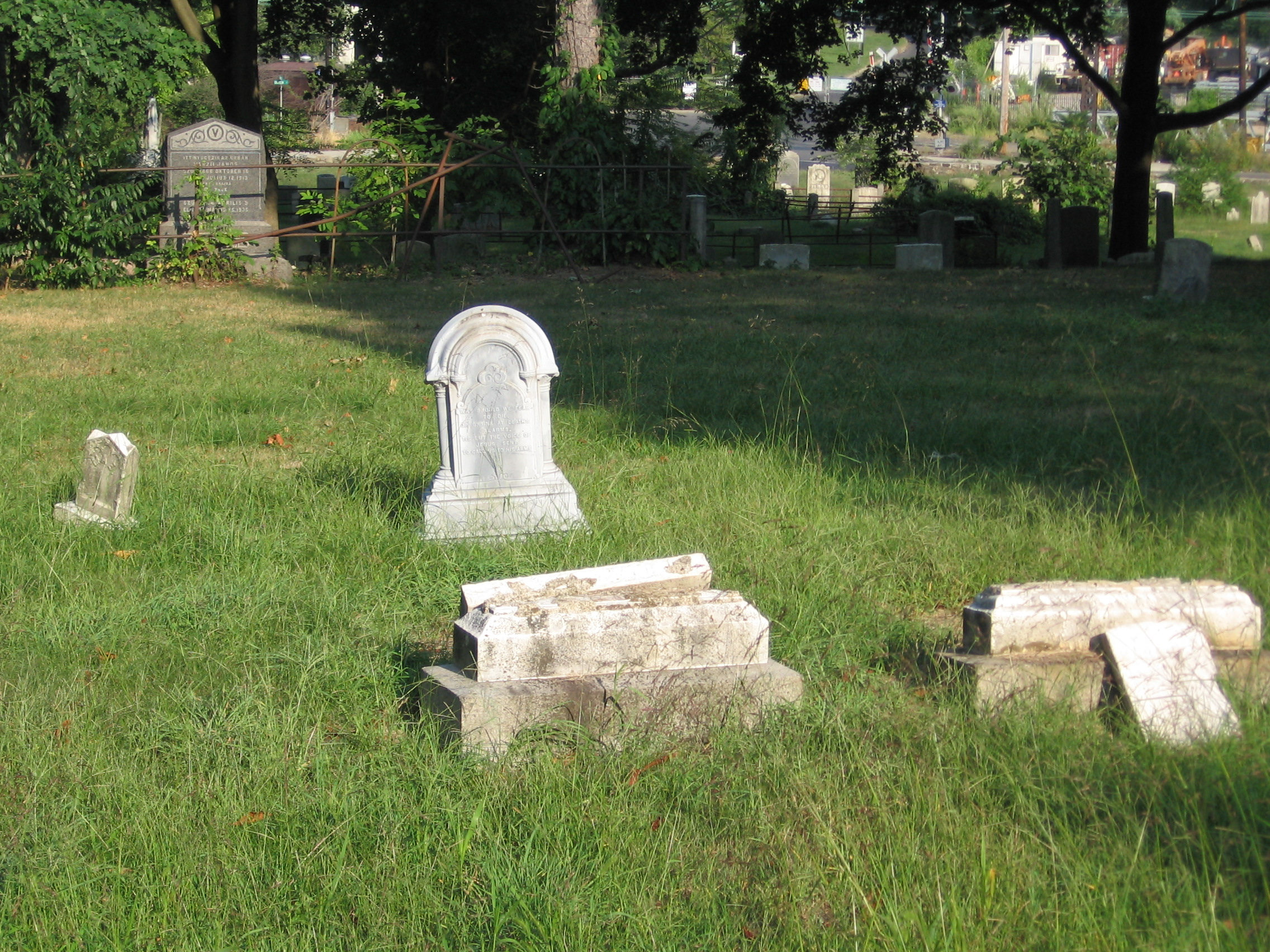
Examples of the many damaged gravestones at Pine Island Cemetery

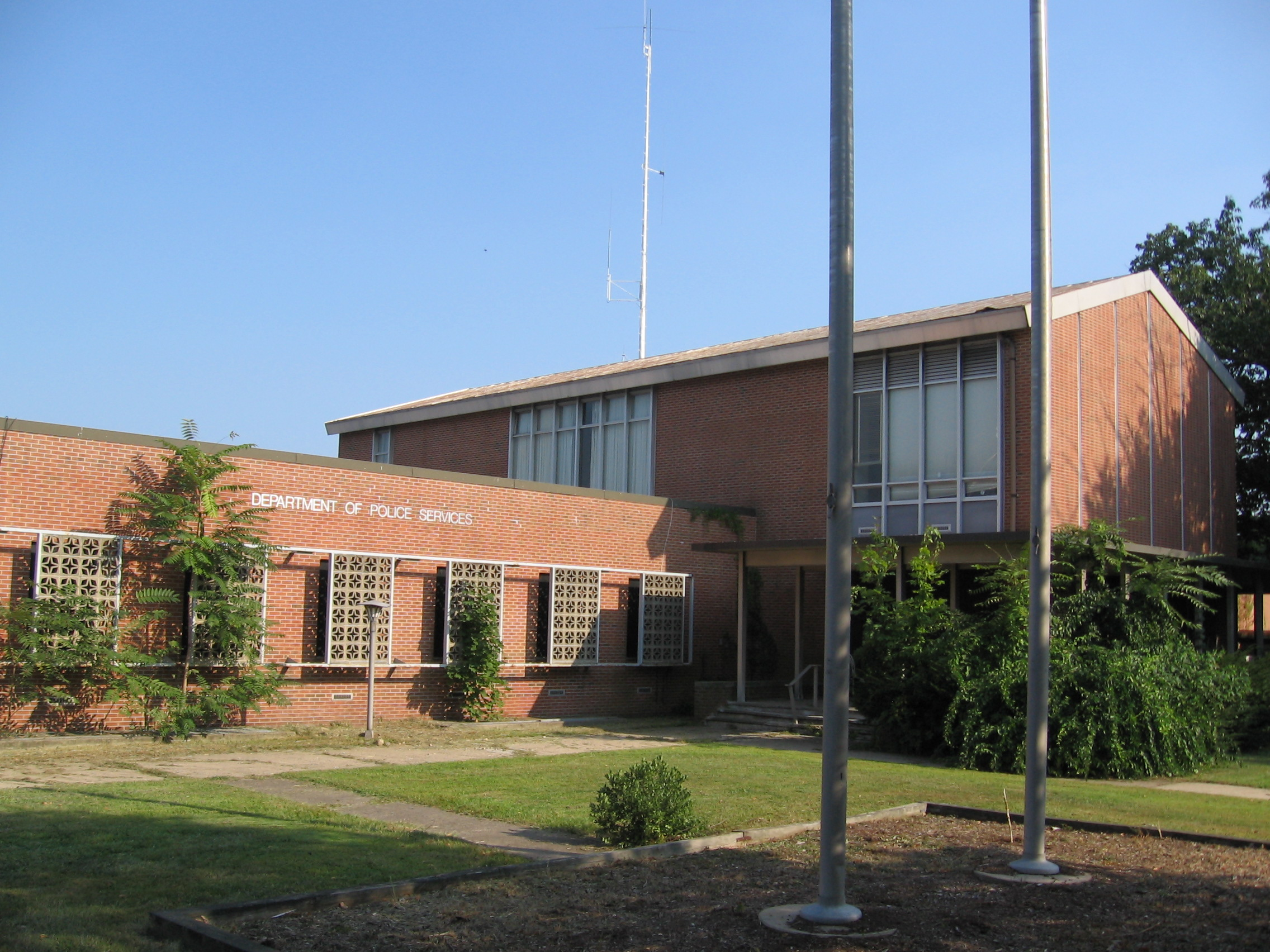
Former police headquarters, Mathews Park

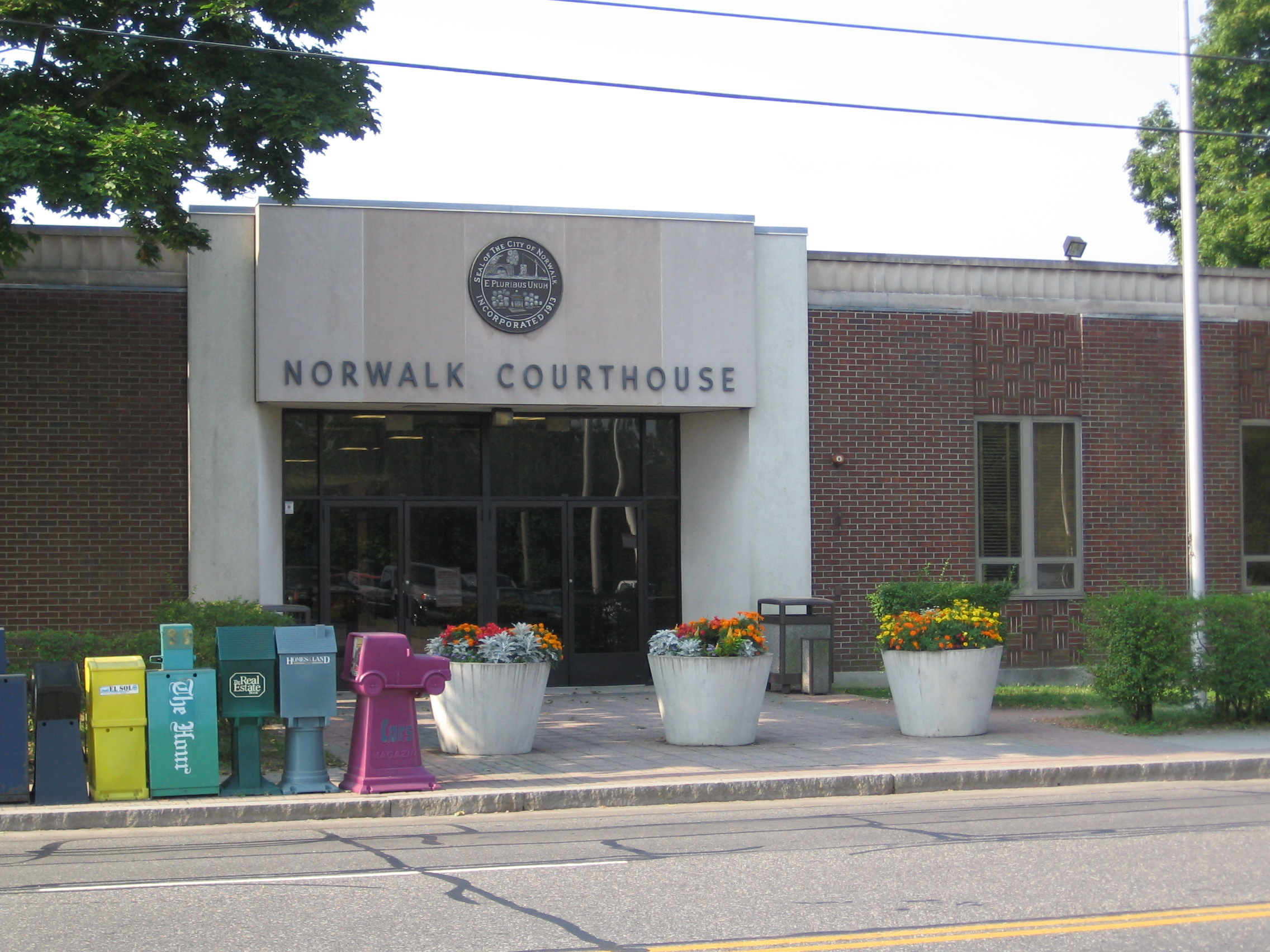
Norwalk Courthouse, Belden Avenue

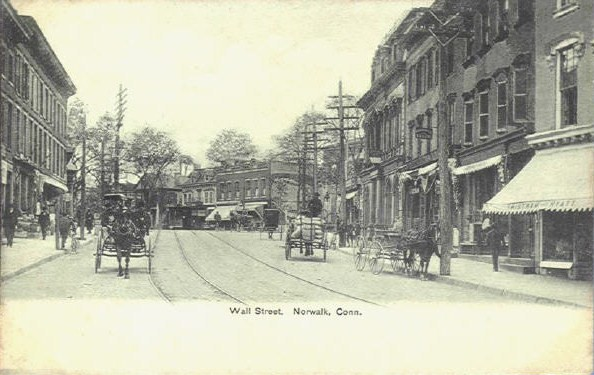
Wall Street, about 1905

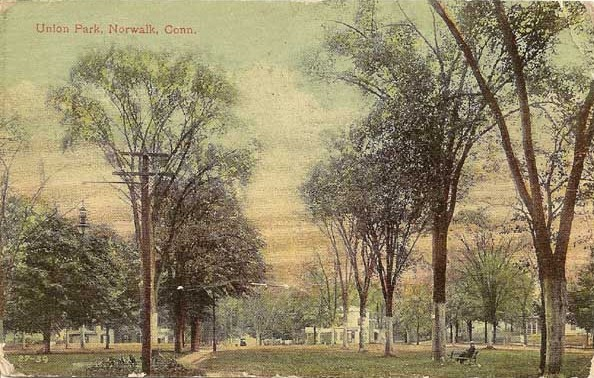
Union Park, about 1913

== See also ==
- Wall Street Historic District (Norwalk, Connecticut)
