= LeGrand Lockwood =

American businessman and financier

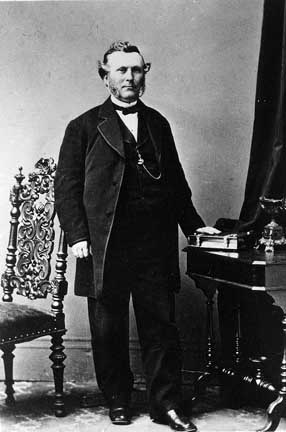
Railroad and banking magnate LeGrand Lockwood

LeGrand Lockwood (c. 1820 – February 24, 1872), was a businessman and financier in New York City in the late 19th century. He built the Lockwood–Mathews Mansion in Norwalk, Connecticut.

== Biography ==
Lockwood was born in Norwalk. He began his career on Wall Street as a clerk for Shipman, Coming & Co. and later worked for T. Ketchum & Co. In 1843 he became junior partner at Genin & Lockwood before founding Lockwood & Company, one of Wall Street's leading brokerage houses, and was a longtime rival of Cornelius Vanderbilt.

Lockwood was a director of the New York Central Railroad and treasurer of the New York Stock Exchange.

In the summer of 1869, Jay Gould, attempting to create a railroad empire with a connection from New York City to the Pacific coast, negotiated with Lockwood, the treasurer and, according to author Kenneth D. Ackerman, the "dominant figure" of the Lake Shore and Michigan Southern Railway. "After hours of haggling over a dinner of oysters, wine and steak at Delmonico's late one August night", Ackerman wrote, Gould came to an agreement with Lockwood that Gould's railroad would build a line into New York City for the narrow-gauge cars used by Lockwood's company in return for westward connections. Lockwood agreed to the deal despite opposition from Vanderbilt, who was simultaneously trying to gain control of the Lake Shore and Michigan Southern by electing proxies to the board of directors.

Learning of the deal, Vanderbilt launched a raid on Lakeshore's stock, which sunk the price from $120 a share to $95 and put Lockwood in danger of personal bankruptcy. Lockwood began making plans to scuttle the deal with Gould. He managed to sell his shares in Lakeshore to Vanderbilt for the bargain price of $10 million, turning over control of the company to him.

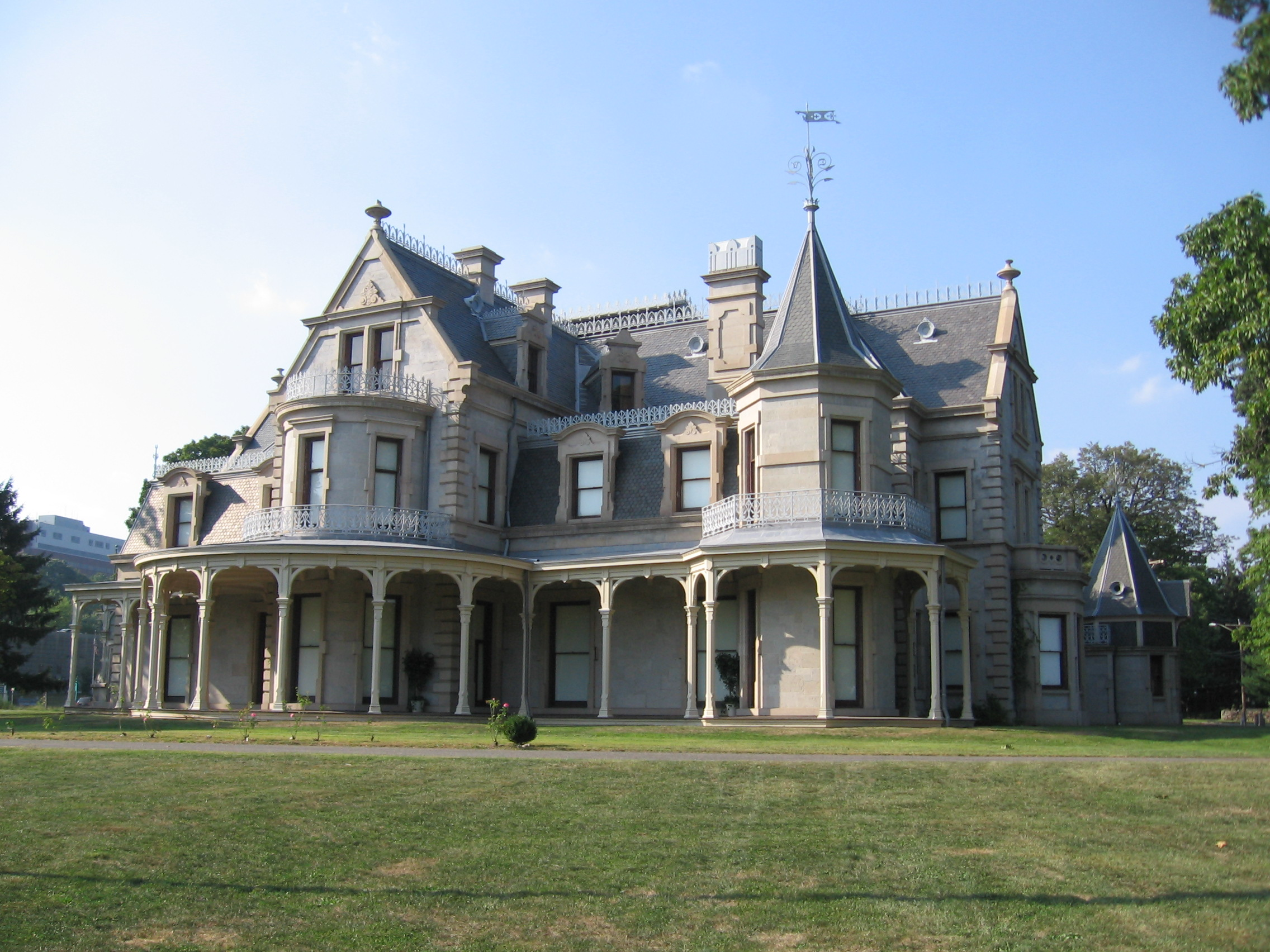
Lockwood–Mathews Mansion in Norwalk, Connecticut

In 1867, Lockwood commissioned Albert Bierstadt's The Domes of the Yosemite, the artist's second great, monumental Yosemite work, for $25,000. It was the artist's largest canvas and sparked a critical debate when it first appeared at the Tenth Street Studio Building in New York. Lockwood hung the painting in the octagonal rotunda of his Norwalk, Connecticut, mansion. After Lockwood's death in 1872, the painting sold at auction for $5,100. Lockwood also bought works by Frederic Church, William Bradford, and Asher B. Durand.

Lockwood died in his Fifth Avenue home in New York City on February 24, 1872. At his death he was a director of the Pacific Mail Steamship Company and the principal owner of the Danbury and Norwalk Railroad.
