= Joseph Mozier =

American sculptor

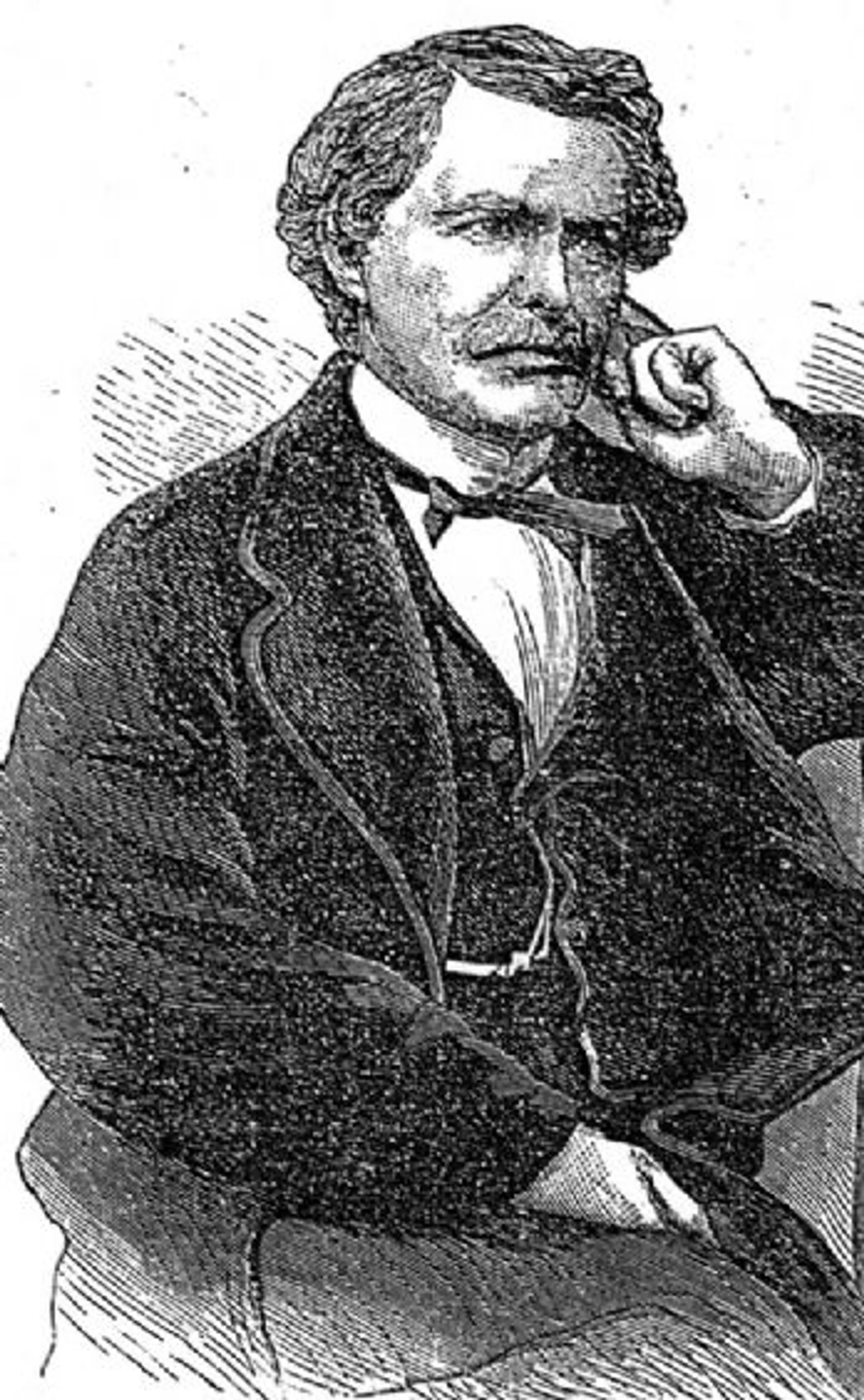
Mozier in an 1876 etching

Joseph Mozier (August 22, 1812 – October 3, 1870) was an American sculptor active in Italy. He was born in Burlington, Vermont, in 1812. In 1831 he moved to New York City, where he worked as a merchant. He retired from business around 1845, and shortly afterward went to Europe, studying sculpture for several years in Florence, after which he moved to Rome.

His best-known work is Undine, the title character in the novella by Friedrich de la Motte Fouqué, a water nymph who falls in love with a man. He won a grand prize for it in Rome in 1867. He made a short visit to the United States in 1870, and was hospitalized upon his return in London, England. He died in Faido, Switzerland, while en route to his home in Italy.

== Selected works ==
- Bust of Pocahontas (1848), Peabody Institute, Baltimore, Maryland. A replica at University of Georgia, Athens, Georgia.
- Bust of Diana (c. 1850), Locust Lawn Estate, New Paltz, New York.
- Pocahontas (1854), Art Institute of Chicago, Chicago, Illinois. A replica at Lockwood–Mathews Mansion, Norwalk, Connecticut.
- Truth (1855), Chrysler Museum of Art, Norfolk, Virginia.
- Silence (1855), Chrysler Museum of Art, Norfolk, Virginia.
- Rebecca at the Well (1855), Chrysler Museum of Art, Norfolk, Virginia. Replicas at New York Historical Society, New York City; Indiana State Museum, Indianapolis, Indiana; Patterson Public Library, Paterson, New Jersey; and Crocker Art Museum, Sacramento, California.
- The American Schoolboy (Young America) (1857), Redwood Library and Athenaeum, Newport, Rhode Island. A replica at Chrysler Museum of Art, Norfolk, Virginia.
- The Prodigal Son (c. 1857), Pennsylvania Academy of the Fine Arts, Philadelphia, Pennsylvania.
- Indian Girl's Lament (1858), Cammie G. Henry Research Center, Northwestern State University, Natchitoches, Louisiana. A replica at Hearst Castle, San Simeon, California.
- Queen Esther (c. 1858).
- The Wept of the Wish-ton-Wish (1862), Lockwood–Mathews Mansion, Norwalk, Connecticut. Replicas at Yale University Art Gallery, New Haven, Connecticut; Chrysler Museum of Art, Norfolk, Virginia; and Arnot Art Museum, Elmira, New York.
- Jephthah's Daughter (1865),
- Il Penseroso (1866), Smithsonian American Art Museum, Washington, D.C.
- Undine (1867), Colby College Museum of Art, Waterville, Maine. Replicas at Chrysler Museum of Art, Norfolk, Virginia; and Boll Theatre, University of Dayton, Dayton, Ohio.
- The Peri (c. 1867), Acklen Mausoleum, Mount Olivet Cemetery, Nashville, Tennessee.
- Flower Girl (Springtime) (1867), Smithsonian American Art Museum, Washington, D.C. A replica at Hudson River Museum, Yonkers, New York.
- The Vigil of Rizpah (1869), Spanierman Gallery, New York City.
- The White Lady of Avenel (1869), Chrysler Museum of Art, Norfolk, Virginia. Replicas at Newark Museum, Newark, New Jersey; and University of Georgia, Athens, Georgia.
- Thomas Moore as a Boy (1870), Arnot Art Museum, Elmira, New York.
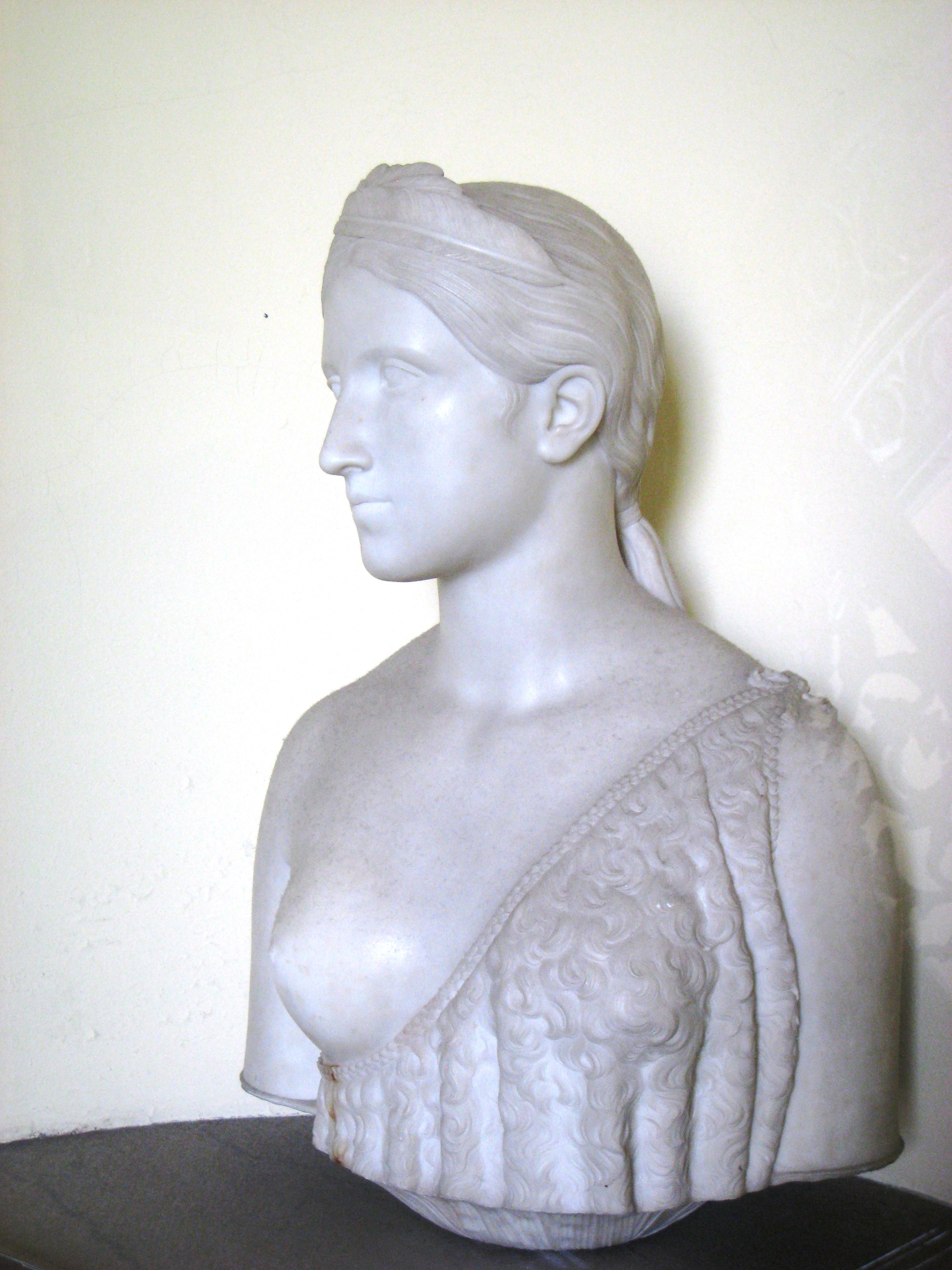
Bust of Pocohantas (1848), Peabody Institute, Baltimore, Maryland

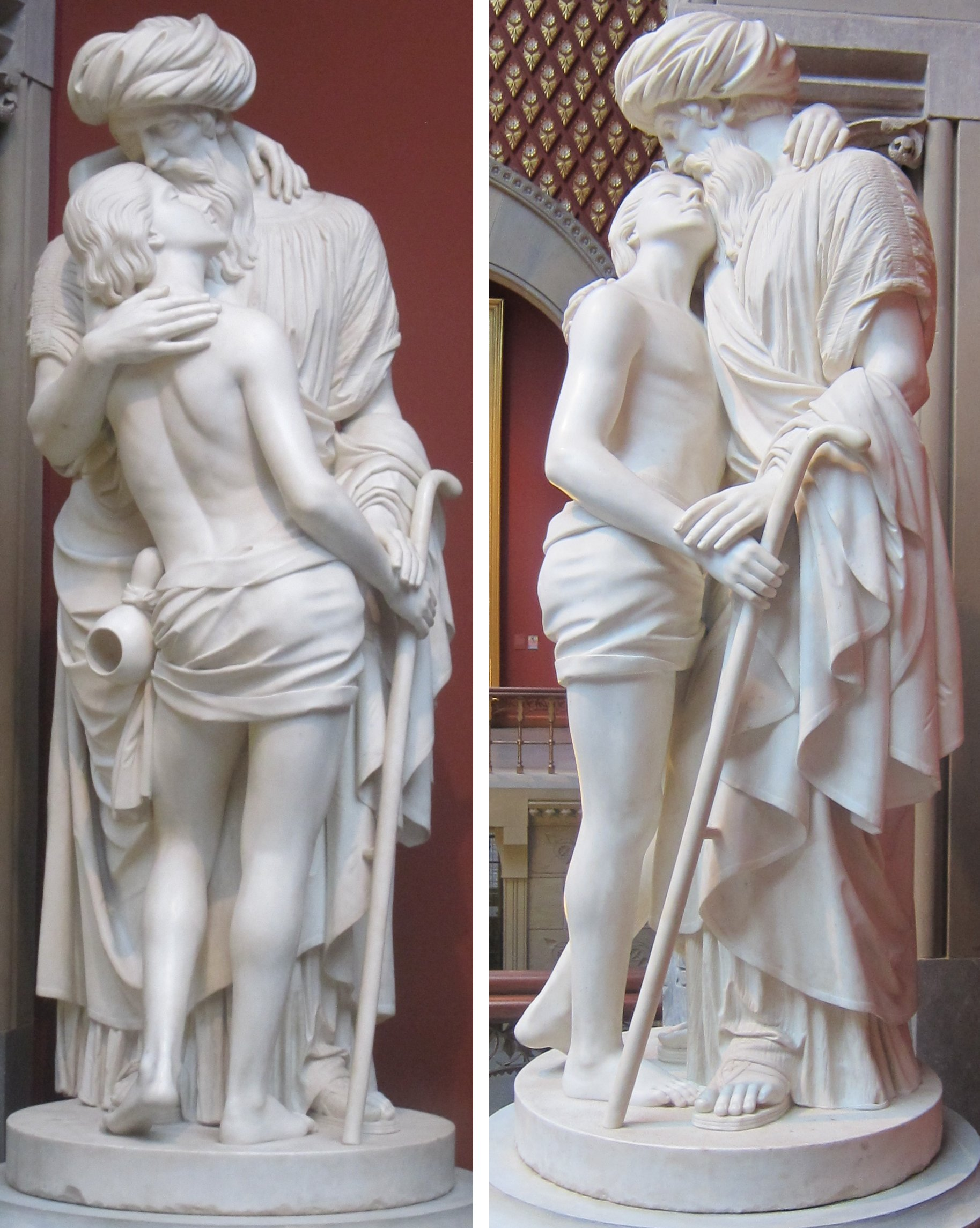
The Prodigal Son (1857), Pennsylvania Academy of the Fine Arts, Philadelphia, Pennsylvania

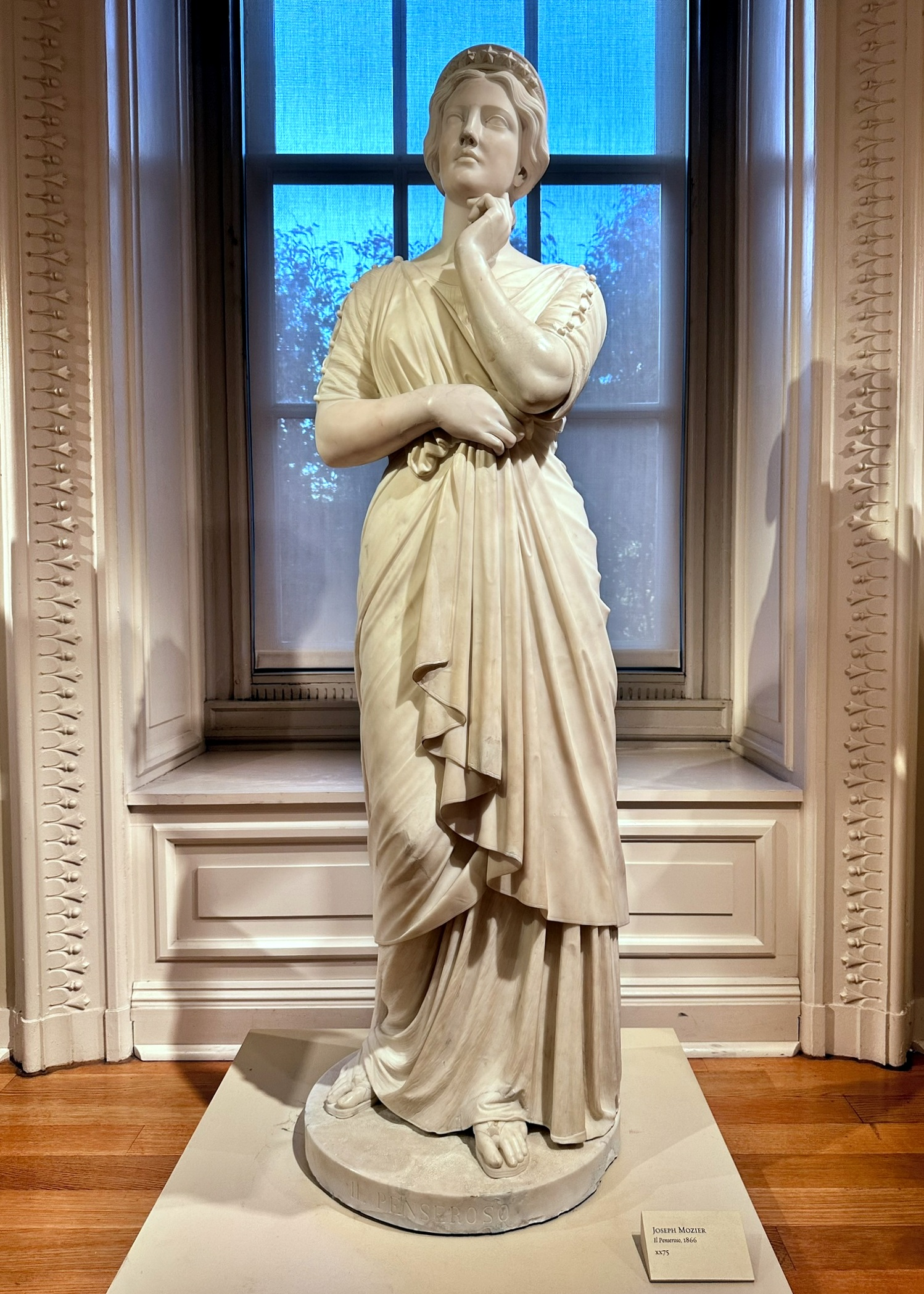
Il Penseroso (1866), Smithsonian American Art Museum, Washington, D.C.

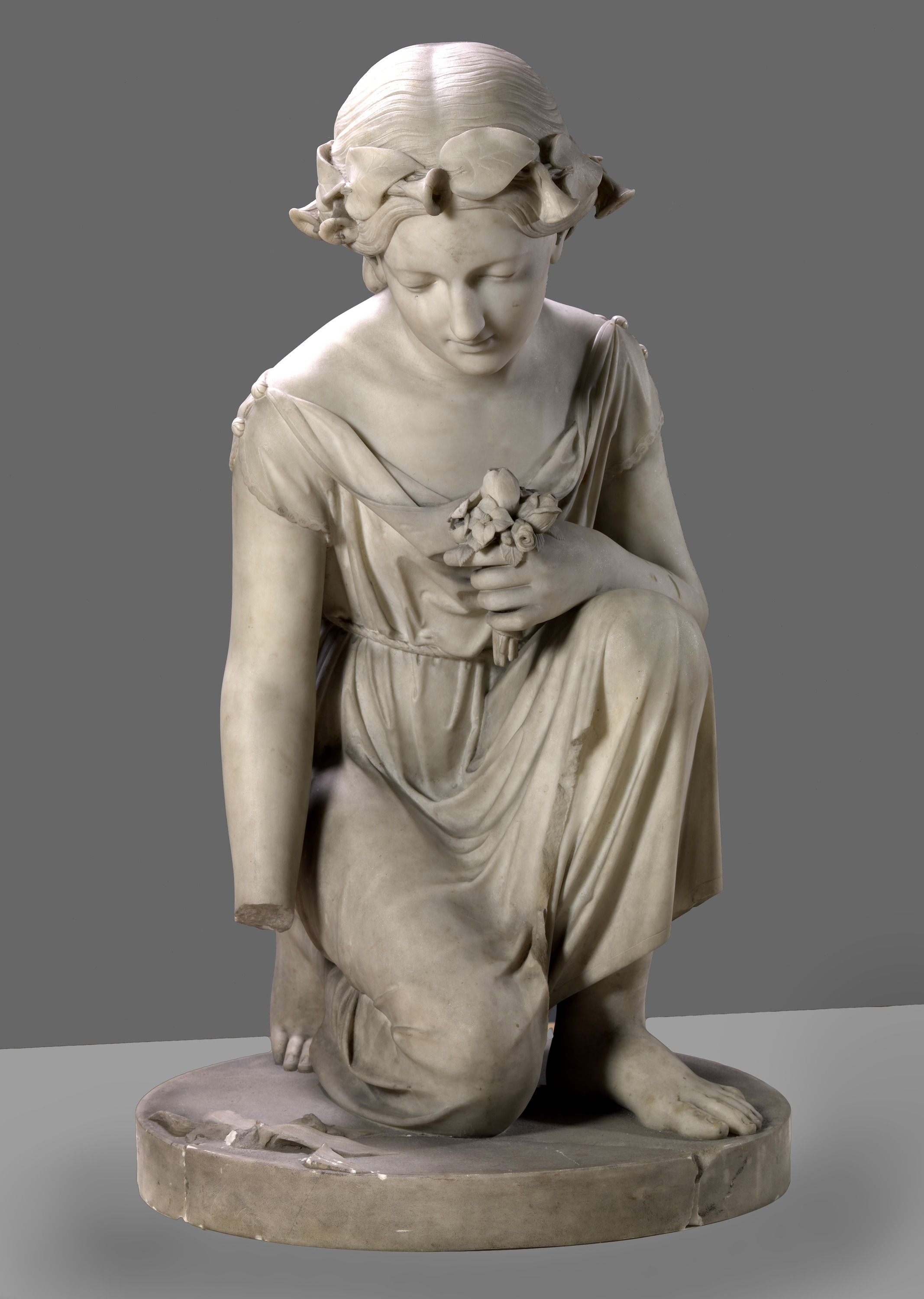
Flower Girl (1867), Smithsonian American Art Museum, Washington, D.C.

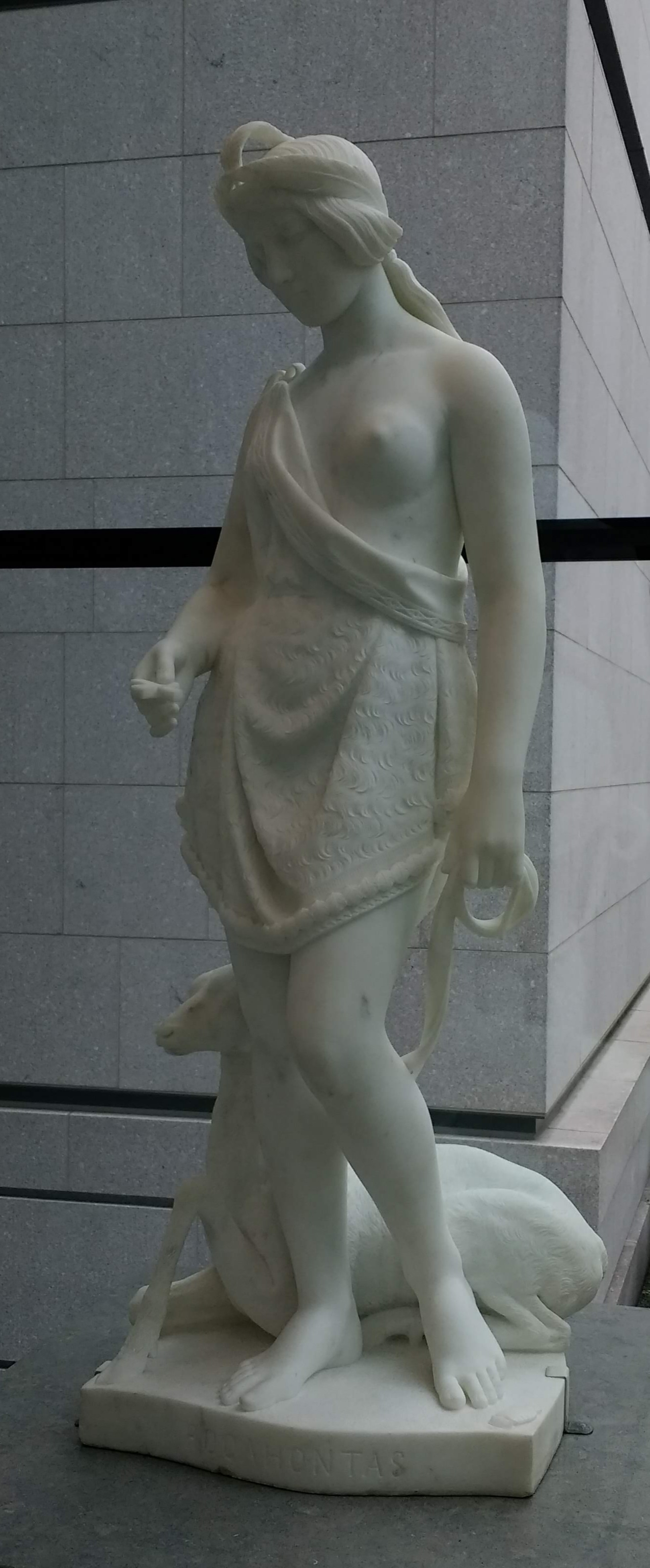
Pocahontas (1867), Museum of Fine Arts, Boston, Massachusetts
