= Norwalk Green Historic District =

Historic district in Connecticut, United States

- U.S. National Register of Historic Places
- U.S. Historic district
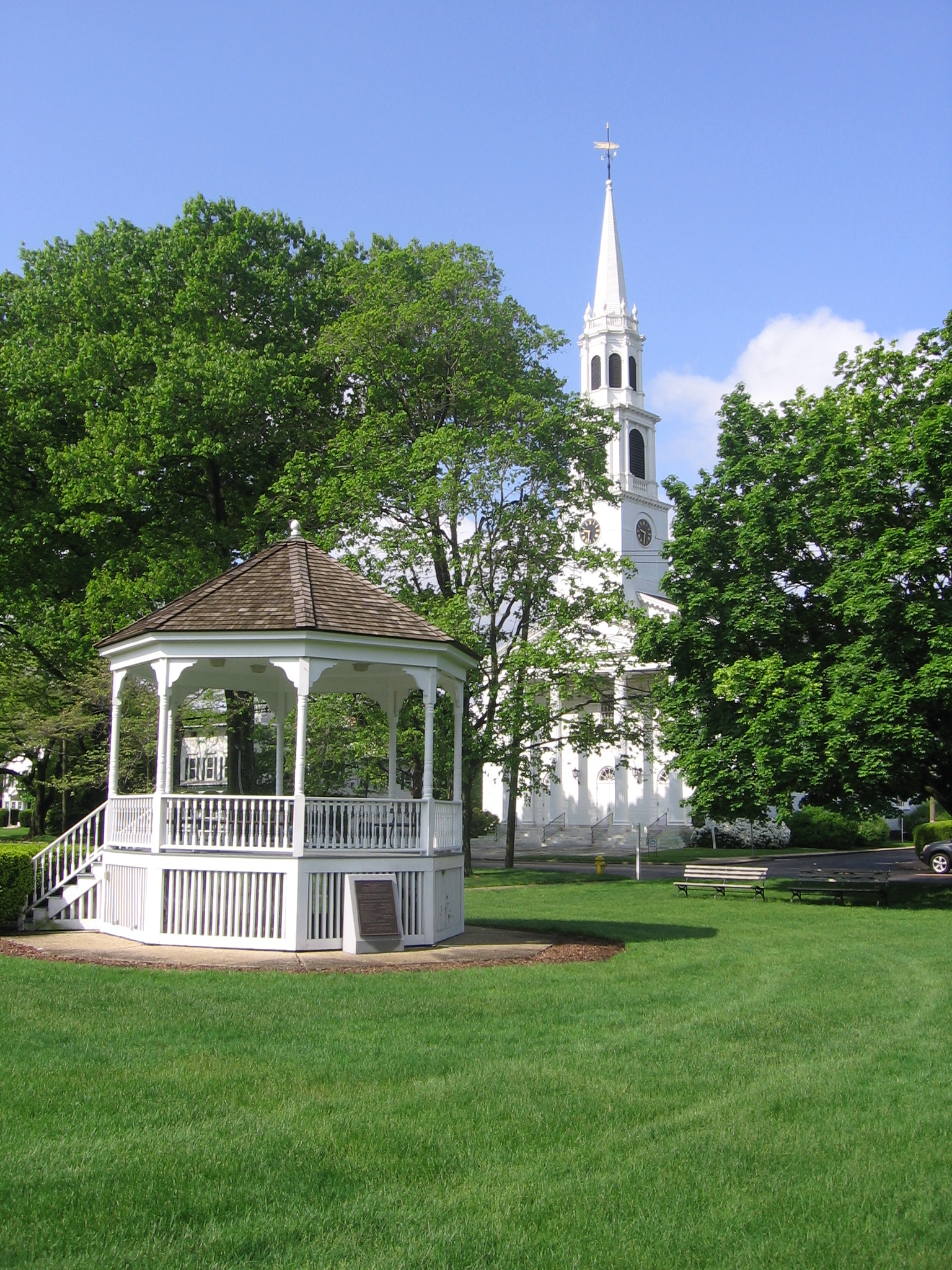
- The gazebo and the First Congregational Church, May 10, 2012

- Location within Connecticut Location within the United States
- Location: Roughly bounded by Smith & Park Streets, Boston Post Road, East, & Morgan Avenues, Norwalk, Connecticut
- Coordinates: 41°7′7″N 73°24′31″W
- Area: 35 acres (14 ha)
- Architectural style: Greek Revival, Late Victorian, Federal
- NRHP reference No.: 87002122
- Added to NRHP: December 14, 1987

The Norwalk Green Historic District is a historic district in the Central Norwalk section of Norwalk, Connecticut. The district is centered on the Norwalk Green, a common area until 1851 that is now a park owned by Norwalk's First Taxing District. It includes St. Paul's Episcopal Church and the First Congregational Church, both of which face the green. The district contains 54 contributing buildings, 3 contributing sites (the Green, Mill Hill Historic Park, and St. Paul's Place), and 1 other contributing object (World War I memorial on the Green), most of which were designed in the 18th and 19th centuries. The district is irregular in shape, drawn to include historic properties in the vicinity of the Norwalk Green, but to exclude non-historic properties.

The district was listed on the National Register of Historic Places in 1987.

== See also ==
- National Register of Historic Places listings in Fairfield County, Connecticut
