= John Canning Studios =

American architecture company

John Canning & Co.

Practice information
- Founders: John Canning
- Founded: 1976
- Location: Headquarters in Cheshire, Connecticut

Website
- https://johncanningco.com/

John Canning & Co., formerly John Canning Studios, is a historic building restoration, conservation and preservation company located in Cheshire, Connecticut. It is led by David Riccio, Dorothea Hennessey, and John Canning.

John Canning & Co. has worked on historic, landmark, and other buildings across the United States, such as the restoration of decorative finishes at the Andrew W. Mellon Auditorium, the restoration of the ceiling mural at Grand Central Terminal, the Shrine of Our Lady of Guadalupe, a new church in La Crosse, Wisconsin designed by Duncan Stroik, and Hulihe'e Palace on the Big Island, involving restoration of lime plaster.

== History ==
The company's founder, John Canning, is an expert on traditional decorative painting techniques and materials and historic color palettes. Canning, a master artisan, has been recognized by the American Institute of Architects, which has appointed him as an honorary AIA member. He is also a Professional Associate of the American Institute for Conservation of Historic & Artistic Works (AIC). He studied at the Scottish Decorative Trade Institute, Stow College, and the Glasgow School of Art while serving a five-year apprenticeship as a church decorator in Glasgow, replicating old-world techniques and materials. After his apprenticeship, he opened a studio in Glasgow as a member of the London City & Guilds. Canning emigrated from Scotland to the United States in the early 1970s and opened a studio in Connecticut.

== Significant projects ==
=== Theatres & entertainment spaces ===
- Academy of Music – Philadelphia, Pennsylvania (Completed 2009)
- Radio City Music Hall - New York, New York (Completed 1999)
- Warner Theatre - Erie, Pennsylvania (Completed 2002)
- Stadium Theatre - Woonsocket, Rhode Island (Completed 2001)
- War Memorial Opera House - San Francisco, California (Completed 1997)
- Mellon Auditorium - Washington, DC (Completed 2023)
- Medinah Country Club - Medinah, Illinois (Completed 1997)

=== Museums ===
- National Building Museum - Washington, DC (Completed 2000)
- The Mark Twain House & Museum - Hartford, Connecticut (Completed 2016)
- Isabella Stewart Gardner Museum - Boston, Massachusetts
- Hulihe'e Palace - Kailua-Kona, Hawaii (Completed 2008)
- Lockwood-Mathew Mansion Museum -Norwalk, Connecticut (Completed 1989; 2008)
- Taft Museum of Art - Cincinnati, Ohio (Completed 2003)

=== Universities & colleges ===
- Sterling Memorial Library - Yale University - New Haven, Connecticut (Completed 2014)
- Battell Chapel - Yale University - New Haven, Connecticut (Completed 1980)
- Hill Auditorium, University of Michigan - Ann Arbor, Michigan (Completed 2004)
- The Culinary Institute of America - Hyde Park, New York (Completed 2003)
- Building 10 M.I.T. – Massachusetts Institute of Technology, Cambridge, Massachusetts (Completed 2010; 2013)
- Kansas State University, Hale Library - Manhattan, Kansas (Completed 2019)

=== Civic ===
- Iowa State Capitol – Des Moines, Iowa (Completed 2005)
- Connecticut State Capitol - Hartford, Connecticut (Completed 1998)

- Michigan State Capitol - East Lansing, Michigan (Completed 1992;2017)
- Pennsylvania State Capitol - Harrisburg, Pennsylvania (Completed 1998–2004)
- Rhode Island State Capitol - Providence, Rhode Island (Completed 1998;1999;2016)
- San Francisco City Hall – San Francisco, California (Completed 1998)
- Massachusetts State House, Hall of Flags - Boston, Massachusetts
- US Treasury Building - Washington, DC (Completed 2001;2004;2006)
- United States Capitol - Washington, DC (Completed 2010;2013; 2021)
- Fulton County Court House - Wauseon, Ohio (Completed 2019; 2020)
- Connecticut Old State House - Hartford, Connecticut (Completed 1994;1995)
- Luzerne County Courthouse - Wilkes-Barre, Pennsylvania (Completed 2018; 2020)

=== Other historic & landmark buildings ===
- Grand Central Terminal - New York, New York (Completed 1997)
- Boston Public Library, McKim Building - Boston, Massachusetts (Completed 1994;1998;2004;2024)
- Washington Union Station - Washington, DC (Completed 2020;2022)
- Steinway Hall (now 111 West 57th Street) -New York, New York (Completed 2020)
- Cosmos Club - Washington, DC (Completed 2012;2016)
- Lenox Library - Lenox, Massachusetts(Completed 2003)

=== Sacred ===
- The First Church of Christ, Scientist, The Mother Church - Boston, Massachusetts (Completed 2018)
- Saint Mary's Church ~ Blessed Michael McGivney Parish - New Haven, Connecticut (Completed 2020)
- Trinity Church, Copley Square - Boston, Massachusetts (Completed 2006;2017;2019)
- Basilica of St. John the Evangelist - Stamford, Connecticut (Completed 2012)
- Shrine of Our Lady of Guadalupe – La Crosse, Wisconsin (Completed 2008)

== Awards ==
- 2021 Preservation Connecticut Janet Jainschigg Award – Honoring Longtime and dedicated preservation professionals
- 2023 ICAA Bulfinch Award - Historic Preservation, St. Mary-St. Catherine of Siena Parish
- 2023 Preservation Connecticut Award of Merit, New London City Hall
- 2022 ICAA McKim, Mead, & White Award, San Joselito's Chapel
- 2020 Palladio Award, Mark Twain House & Museum -Mahogany Suite
- 2019 Palladio Award, Luzerne County Courthouse
- 2020 Bulfinch Award - Craftsmanship/Artisanship, Mark Twain House & Museum
- 2020 Build Connecticut Award - Specialty Interiors, St. Thomas More
- 2018 Trumbauer Award given by the Philadelphia ICAA Chapter, Luzerne County Courthouse
- 2008 White House Recognition, Secretary of War Suite Eisenhower Executive Office Building
- 2004 Arthur Ross Award for Excellence & Leadership in the Art of Preservation & Conservation, The Institute of Classical Architecture & Art
- 1992 National Preservation Honor Award, National Trust for Historic Preservation, Michigan State Capitol Restoration
