= Lockwood-Mathews Mansion =

Historic house in Connecticut, United States

- Lockwood–Mathews Mansion
- U.S. National Register of Historic Places
- U.S. National Historic Landmark
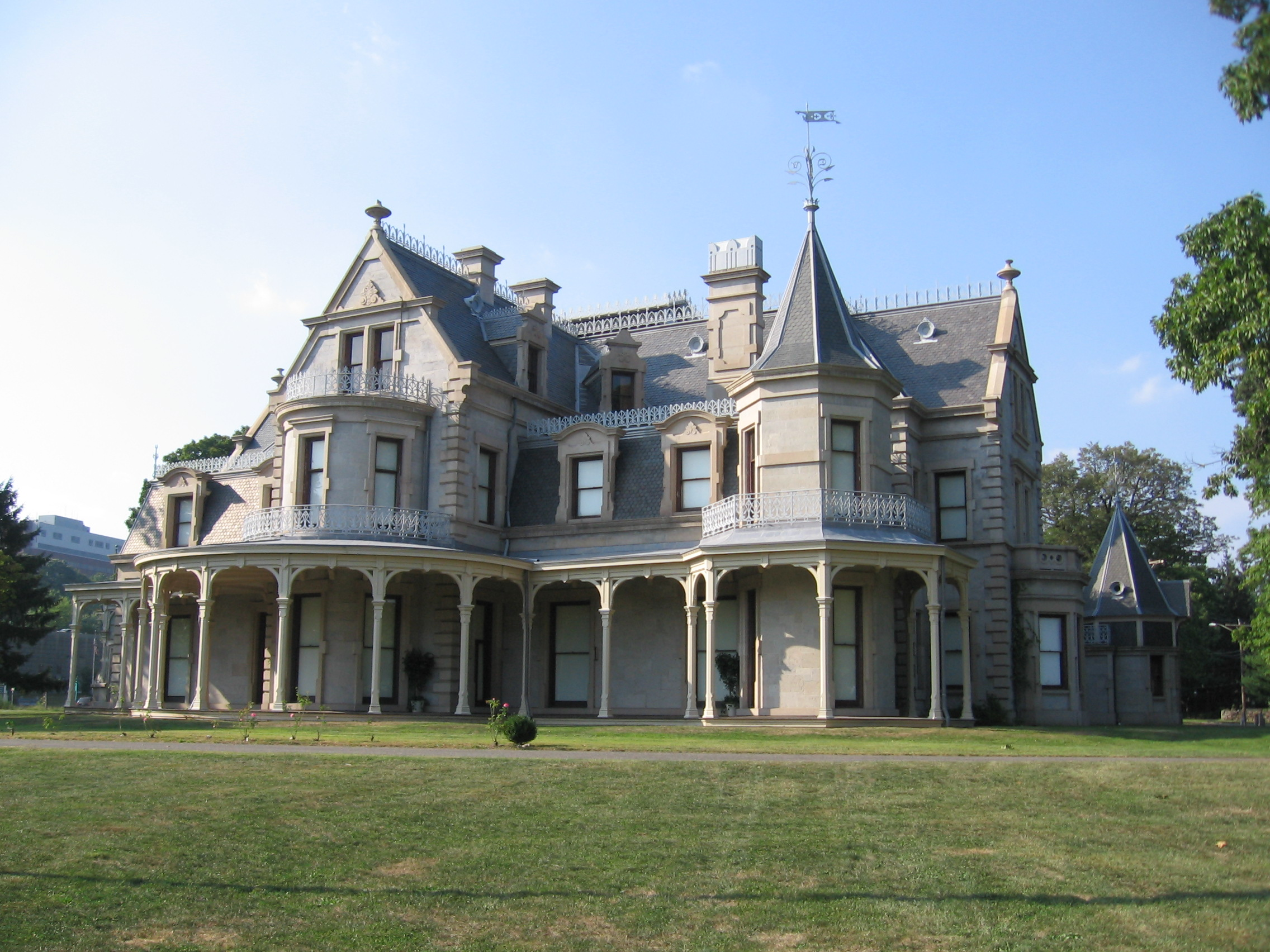
- South side of the mansion

- Location within Connecticut Location within the United States
- Interactive map showing the location of Lockwood-Mathews Mansion
- Location: 295 West Avenue, Norwalk, Connecticut
- Coordinates: 41°6′31.68″N 73°25′1.56″W
- Built: 1864
- Architect: Detlef Lienau
- Architectural style: Second Empire
- NRHP reference No.: 70000836

Significant dates
- Added to NRHP: December 30, 1970
- Designated NHL: December 30, 1970

The Lockwood–Mathews Mansion is a Second Empire style country house in Norwalk, Connecticut. Now a museum, it was built in 1864-68 for railroad and banking magnate LeGrand Lockwood. The 62-room 44,000 square feet (4,100 m^{2}) mansion was listed on the National Register of Historic Places and was declared a National Historic Landmark in 1978.

It has been described as "one of the earliest and finest surviving Second Empire style country houses ever built in the United States." It sits at 295 West Ave., in Mathews Park, where the Stepping Stones Museum for Children is also located.

== History ==
=== As private home ===
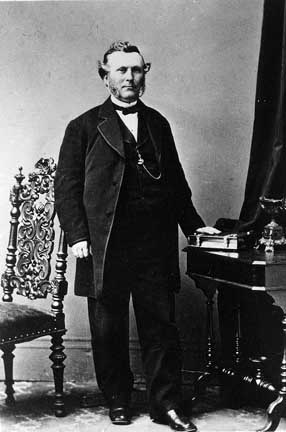
Railroad and banking magnate LeGrand Lockwood

The home was built on an estate, then called "Elm Park," for LeGrand Lockwood, who made his fortune in banking and the railroad industry. Construction began in 1864 just west of the Norwalk River in Norwalk and was completed four years later. Designed by European-trained, New York-based architect Detlef Lienau, the 44,000 square feet (4,100 m^{2}) mansion features 26,402 square feet (2,452.8 m^{2}) of living space and "is considered his most significant surviving work," according to the association. Both American and immigrant artisans worked to construct and decorate the house. Prominent New York decorating firms, including Herter Brothers and Leon Marcotte were contracted to furnish the mansion's interiors.

Financial reversals in 1869 and Lockwood's death in 1872 resulted in loss of the estate through foreclosure in 1874 by Lockwood's heirs. Charles D. Mathews, described in his New York Times obituary as "a very wealthy retired New-York provision dealer", and his wife, Rebecca Thompson Mathews, bought the property in 1876. The mansion was a residence and suburban retreat for the Mathews family, with their Thompson and Martin relatives, until the death of Charles's daughter Florence in 1938.

=== As museum ===
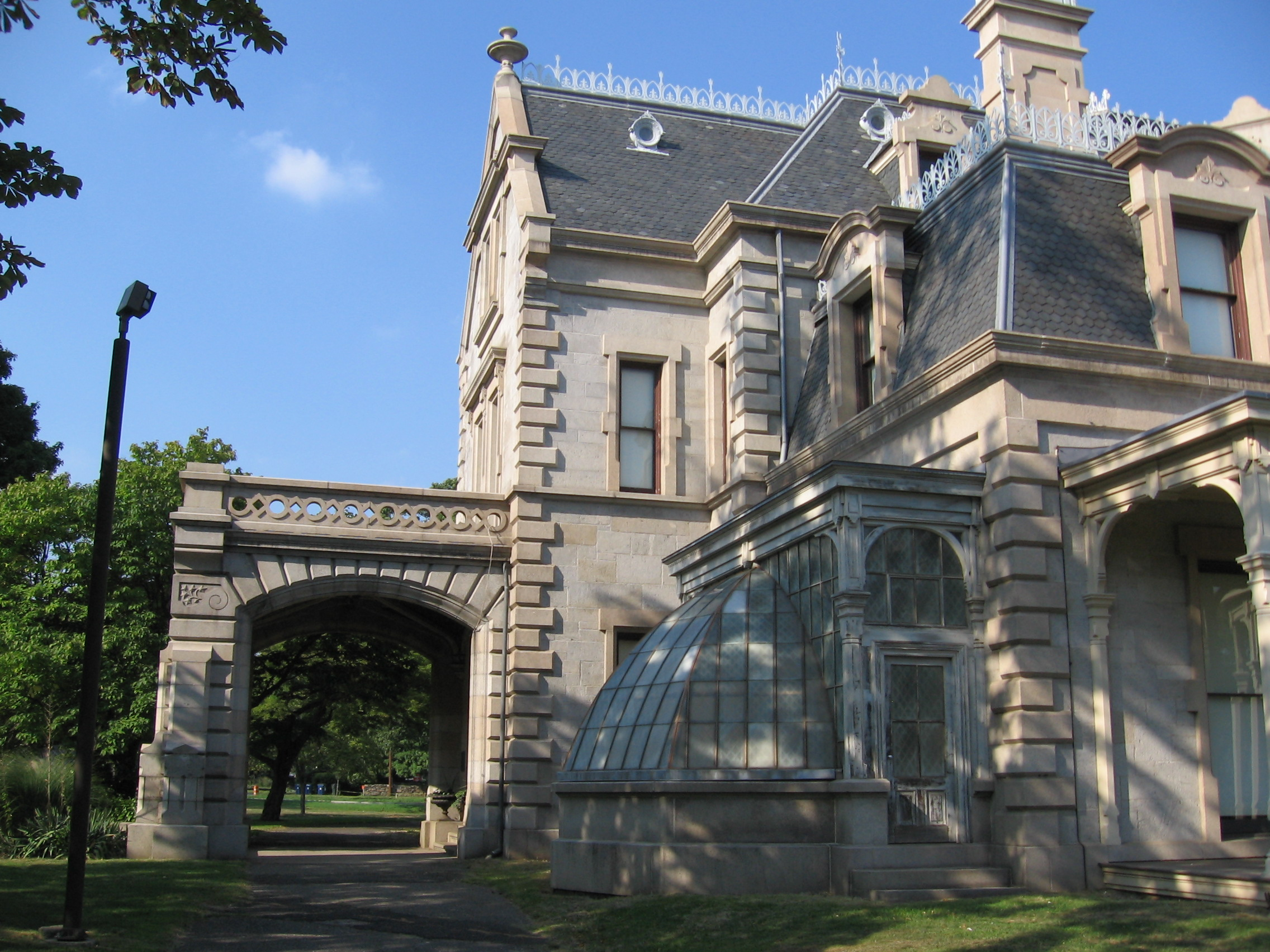
West side of the home seen from the south, showing porte-cochere and greenhouse

Built in 1864–68, the home is an early example of the style used by wealthy New York City elites such as the Vanderbilts in building their Gilded Age mansions later in the 19th century, and set a new standard for opulence. In 1941 the estate was sold to the City of Norwalk, which designated it a public park. The city had planned in 1959 "to build a city hall in the park and tear down the mansion to make way for it." Considerable controversy and claims of bad faith ensued, leaving the building threatened with demolition. Local preservationists formed Lockwood–Mathews Mansion Museum, Inc. to run the site. The Junior League of Stamford-Norwalk eventually led a late 1960s restoration, supported by the National Trust for Historic Preservation, the American Institute of Architects, the National Park Service, and the Connecticut Historical Commission. The home was designated a National Historic Landmark in 1971.

According to the museum organization's Web site, the museum's mission "is to conserve the building while creating educational programs on the material, artistic and social culture of the Victorian era". In the 2000s, statues and furniture that had originally been in the mansion were bought and placed back in it. Two marble statues, sculpted in 1859 by Joseph Mozier, an American artist, and bought by Lockwood, were purchased for $185,000. A $165,000 sofa original to the home was also acquired and brought back to it.

A master plan for a more comprehensive restoration of the mansion was completed in 2008. Plans for renovation work at the museum include adding an elevator, and systems for heating, air conditioning, and sprinklers. Renovation costs were likely to total about $6 million, museum officials said in May 2007, before the master plan was complete. In 2023, the museum's officials announced that the house would close for a year for mechanical upgrades; the project had been part of the 2008 master plan. Designed by David Scott Parker Architects, the renovation was partly funded by $3 million from the Norwalk city government. The project cost $18 million in total and included an HVAC system, a fire suppression system, new lighting, and Wi-Fi. Ahead of the museum's reopening on June 4, 2025, a ceremony was hosted on May 27.

== Programs and events ==
In a decades-long Christmastime tradition, interior decorators deck out about a dozen rooms in the mansion with holiday decorations. An annual "community celebration" is held in December with Christmas music, refreshments and a Santa Claus. In 2007, 10 interior decorators volunteered their services and materials for the event.

The museum has hosted an annual antique show since 1978. In 2006 the show was held the last weekend in October and attracted dealers from Ohio and Pennsylvania as well as Connecticut.

== In media ==
The home was used as a filming location for The Stepford Wives in 1975 and for the 2004 remake. Paramount Pictures paid the museum $400,000 to paint its central rotunda for the remake. The studio also left behind some large paintings (in essence, theatrical pastiches), which serve to emphasize the dramatic size of the rotunda. As a result, the walls look fresh and decorated, and will remain protected until further funds become available for proper, curatorial restoration of the original damaged surfaces.

The mansion was also featured in the movies House of Dark Shadows and Mr. Harrigan's Phone.

Panoramic view

== See also ==
- List of National Historic Landmarks in Connecticut
- National Register of Historic Places listings in Fairfield County, Connecticut
