= Boyden =

Boyden may refer to:

== Places ==
=== United States ===
- Boyden Cave, a mile-long cavern located in the Giant Sequoia National Monument of the Sequoia National Forest, California
- Boyden–Hull High School, a high school in Hull, Iowa
- Boyden, Iowa, a city
- Boyden Library in Foxborough, Massachusetts
- Seth Boyden House in Foxborough, Massachusetts

=== Other countries ===
- Boyden Gate, parish of Chislet, Kent, England
- Boyden Observatory, South Africa

== People with the surname ==
- C. Boyden Gray, American attorney
- Amanda Boyden, American novelist
- David Dodge Boyden, American musicologist
- Edward Boyden, American neuroscientist
- Elbridge Boyden, American architect
- Frank Boyden Deerfield Academy Headmaster
- Georgie Boyden St. John, American composer
- Ian Boyden, American artist
- James Boyden, British politician
- Jennifer Boyden, American poet
- John Boyden, British music industry executive
- Joseph Boyden, Canadian novelist
- Linda Boyden, American poet
- Malcolm Boyden, British radio personality
- Matthew Boyden, multiple people
- Nate Boyden, American soccer player
- Nathaniel Boyden, American politician
- Philo Boyden, American politician
- Sally Boyden (disambiguation), multiple people
- Seth Boyden, American inventor
- Stephen Boyden, Australian scientist and author
- Uriah A. Boyden, American engineer and inventor

== Other ==
- 4301 Boyden, main-belt asteroid
- Boyden Carpenter, American musician
- Boyden Chamber, a type of chemotaxis assay
