= Alfred Atmore Pope =

American industrialist and art collector

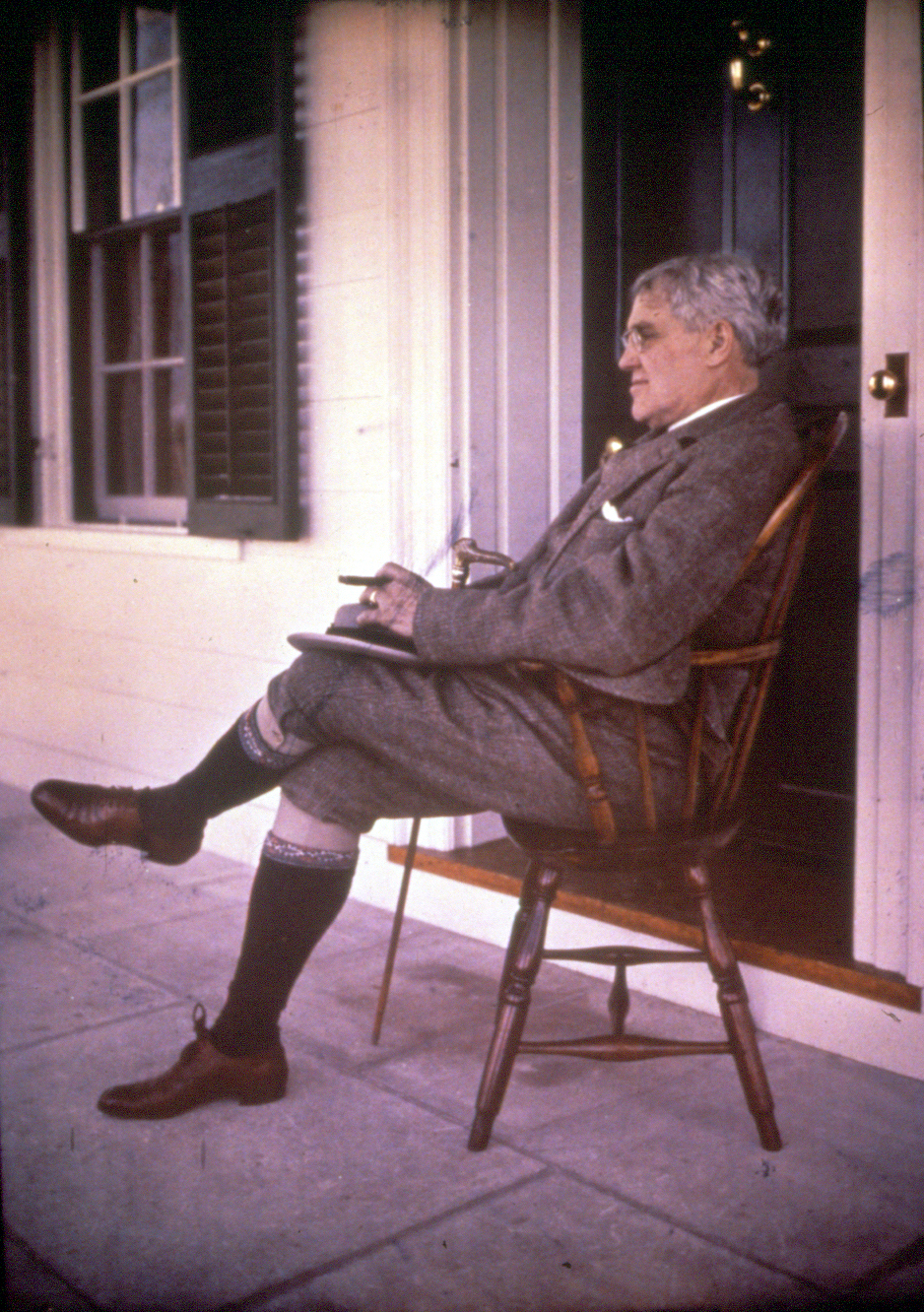
Alfred Atmore Pope at Hill-Stead, his Connecticut estate

Alfred Atmore Pope (July 4, 1842 – August 5, 1913) was an American industrialist and art collector. He was the father of Theodate Pope Riddle, a noted American architect.

== Family background ==
Alfred Pope's ancestors came to the New World from Yorkshire, England in 1834 and settled in Massachusetts. He was born in North Vassalboro, Maine on July 4, 1842. His father Alton was a successful businessman during The Great Exhibition at The Crystal Palace in 1851. In 1861 he moved his family to Ohio, in an old Quaker town in the Connecticut Western Reserve. Later in Cleveland, Alton set up a wool business again with his sons as partners. In 1862, Alfred Pope joined the production company of Alton Pope and Sons and in 1866 married Ada Lunette Brooks of Salem, whose family, like his, had roots in the wool industry. The couple's only child, Theodate, was born one year later.

== Business career ==
In 1869 Alfred Pope left the family business and, with loans from his brother-in-law Joshua Brooks and others, bought into the Cleveland Malleable Iron Company, a concern which had been formed a year earlier by five Cleveland men. Pope entered the firm as secretary and treasurer and within ten years rose to the rank of president, an office he held until his death in 1913. With the rapid industrialization and urbanization of the country, malleable iron – a form of metal exceptionally stronger than forged iron – became an important commodity in the construction industry. Under Pope's leadership the Cleveland Company eventually expanded to include a group of six malleable iron and steel castings plants in the mid-west, known as the National Malleable Castings Company. He was also involved with several other manufacturing enterprises and financial institutions. As his company and personal wealth grew, Pope moved his family up the ladder of Cleveland society and eventually built a Richardsonian Romanesque townhouse on Euclid Avenue in one of the city's most fashionable districts. John D. Rockefeller was among his neighbors.

Alfred Atmore Pope died at his home in Farmington, Connecticut on August 5, 1913.

== Art collection ==
In the last years of the 1880s Alfred Pope emerged as a serious collector of paintings and other works of art. During the next two decades he acquired pictures by Édouard Manet, Claude Monet, Edgar Degas, Camille Pissarro and Pierre-Auguste Renoir, as well as James McNeill Whistler and Mary Cassatt, thus becoming one of the earliest American collectors of Impressionist paintings. While it is not possible to identify any one impetus behind his collecting, his close friend and business colleague J.H. Whittemore and his son Harris were both buying Impressionist paintings at this time, and the Pope and Whittemore collections in many ways paralleled one another. The counsel of several artists also had an influence on Pope's growing collection. In particular he acknowledged his debt to Whistler, whom he first met in Paris in 1894, writing to him in October of that year on his return to New York "Our horizon was enlarged, taste refined, and love of the beautiful nourished by our good fortune in meeting the Whistlers." Whistler had not only recommended where Pope see his own paintings in London with the idea of purchasing them (Pope already owned several Whistler prints and had just bought The Blue Wave, Biarritz), but the painter also directed him to a shop, Parke's on Vigo Street, where they could see "beautiful old settings–rugs–baskets and the rest of it that Mrs. Pope and your daughter Theodate will delight in." Ultimately, though he did entertain the advice of others with regard to his purchases, Alfred Pope relied on his own judgement to guide him to works that would both satisfy his personal aesthetic and contribute to the harmony of his surroundings.

Alfred Pope's collection of paintings was relatively small compared with those of some of his American contemporaries, but its reputation grew as he began to lend to exhibitions in Cleveland, New York and Boston. Two of his Monets and a Degas made an especially strong impact at the Cleveland Art Loan Exhibition of 1894. Later his collection was among those chosen by Auguste F. Jaccaci and John La Farge for inclusion in Concerning Noteworthy Paintings in American Private Collections, a lavish fifteen-volume project of which only two volumes appeared. In 1910 the Pope collection was featured with that of Harris Whittemore and others in an article in The Burlington Magazine, French Paintings in American Collections by Dr. E. Waldmann, who pointed out that one had to travel to the United States if one wished to make a serious study of modern painting.

To complement their paintings, the Popes accumulated an extensive collection of furniture, sculpture, ceramics and silver. Receipts for purchases they made during their European tour of 1888/1889 reveal the typically wide range of their interests. They bought majolica and frames in Venice, and a Roman bust from an Italian dealer; Whistler and Charles Méryon prints, a boulle inkstand, mahogany liquor case, Persian rugs and a William Morris tapestry based on Walter Crane's The Goose Girl in London; and in Paris a Venetian mirror, Antoine-Louis Barye bronzes, Japanese prints and three Monets from leading art dealers Boussoud, Valadon. These, their first purchases of French Impressionist paintings, included Monet's View of Cap d'Antibes, 1888 and Grainstacks, White Frost Effect, 1889.

With his acquisition of Japanese prints and Chinese porcelain, Alfred Pope was following a fashionable trend of the last decades of the nineteenth century when Asian objects became popular adornments in American homes. Because of their sympathetic arrangement with paintings and decorative objects on mantelpieces, or their isolated placement on occasional tables, Chinese porcelains played a prominent role in the decoration of the family's home. In addition, Pope acquired mainstream paintings in the officially sanctioned academic style of Pierre Puvis de Chavannes and Eugène Carrière as well as numerous decorative arts objects including bronze sculpture, Asian and European porcelains, and Asian, American and European prints - etchings, mezzotints and woodblocks.

Alfred Pope's interest in Impressionist paintings distinguished him within a select group of connoisseurs at the turn of the twentieth century, making a radical departure from the traditional tastes of many of his peers who acquired only Old Master paintings and drawings. Favoring quality over quantity, Pope took home the best works of art, rather than the most. Today, his noteworthy collection remains on display at his former country estate, Hill-Stead Museum in Farmington, Connecticut.
