= Avon Old Farms =

Private school in Avon, Connecticut, US

Avon Old Farms School

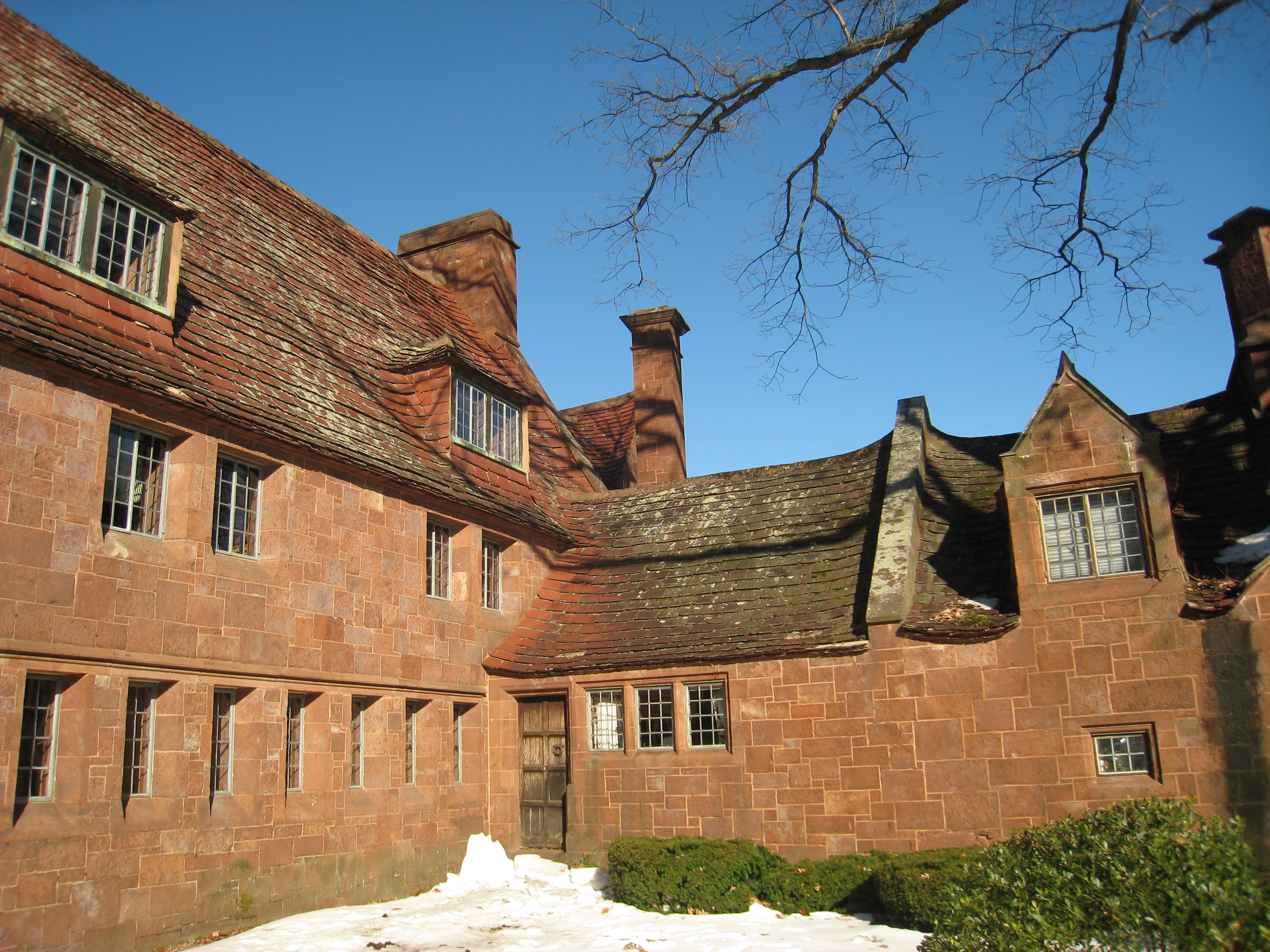
- Exterior view of the Cotswold-style campus

Location
- 500 Old Farms Road; Avon, Connecticut 06001; United States; 41°46′43″N 72°50′24″W

Information
- Type: Independent boarding high school
- Motto: Latin: Aspirando et Perseverando (Aspiring and Persevering)
- Established: 1927 (99 years ago)
- Founder: Theodate Pope Riddle
- CEEB code: 070010
- Head of school: Jim Detora
- Faculty: 61 teachers
- Grades: 9–12
- Gender: All-boys
- Enrollment: 405 students (9–12, PG); 71% boarding (2024–2025)
- Average class size: 12
- Student to teacher ratio: 6:1
- Campus size: 900 acres (360 ha)
- Colors: Crimson and navy blue
- Athletics: 15 varsity interscholastic sports teams (36 interscholastic teams total)
- Athletics conference: Founders League
- Nickname: Winged Beavers
- Endowment: $57 million
- Tuition: $81,185 (boarding) $61,660 (day)
- Revenue: $42.4 million
- Website: avonoldfarms.com

Avon Old Farms School is a boarding school for boys located in Avon, Connecticut, United States. Theodate Pope Riddle, one of America's first female architects, founded the school in 1927.

== History ==
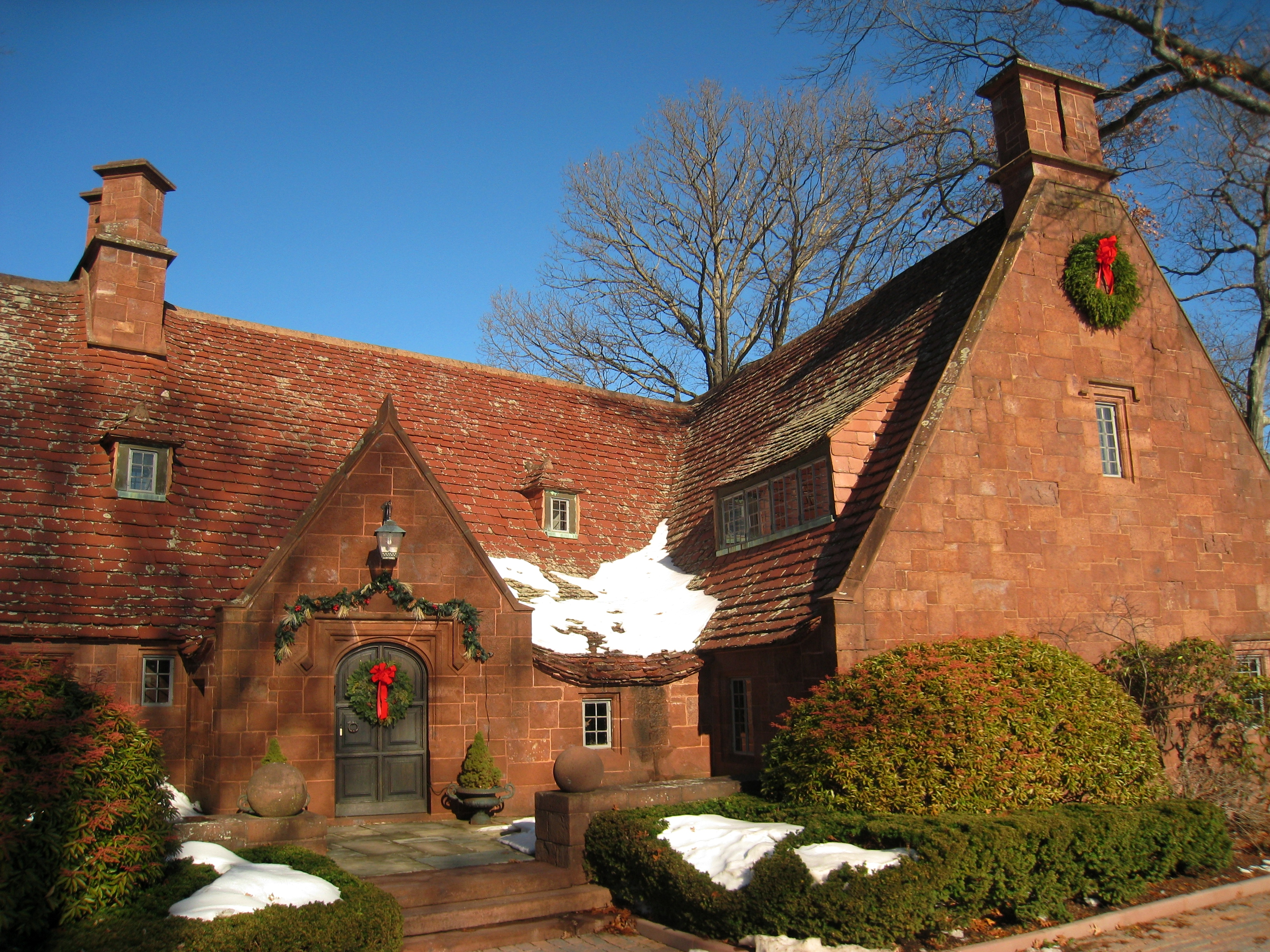
Campus buildings along the village green

The school's conception dates to a few years before 1918 when Riddle purchased 3,000 acres (1,200 ha) of land on which to build it. Together with the architect Charles A. Platt, she toured several boys' schools in New England, including Andover, Groton School, Hotchkiss School, Middlesex School, Pomfret School, St. Mark's School, and St. Paul's School, but as she wrote to a friend, "They all illustrate exceedingly well the things I wish to avoid." In 1918 she created the Pope-Brooks Foundation, to manage both her house, Hill-Stead and its artworks, and the as-yet unformed new school. The school's earliest buildings, which she designed, were constructed from 1923 to 1926 by over 500 workers from America and the Cotswolds. For her designs Riddle was elected a Fellow of the American Institute of Architects, and awarded the Robinson Memorial Medal of the Architectural Club of New Haven.

John Wallace Riddle set about designing the Avon buildings in a manner resembling the houses and spatial dimensions of an old English village. She had previously designed Westover School for Girls. A handbook published in 1925 said that Avon, then in planning, sought to cultivate "the sturdiness of character found in the old New England stock of Colonial times." Each student was to work for an hour or two daily for the school community or on the school farm. Carpentry and forestry were other forms of work that Riddle found valuable. She thought of students as citizens in a "small commonwealth."

The school's earliest days were marked by vigorous disagreements between Riddle and the school's board and members. She dismissed the board in 1926 when it refused to grant her absolute control and refused her dictum that "there will be no gymnasium and no indoor inter-school athletics." The school was then run directly by the Pope-Brooks foundation. Its first Provost (headmaster), John Mitchell Froelicher, served from 1927 to 1929, when he, too, was dismissed. After several abortive attempts to find a replacement, Percy Gamble Kammerer was named Provost in August 1930. He served until January 1940, when he was forced to resign. That summer, W. Brooke Stabler was named as his replacement. He, again, had disagreements with Riddle, who was unbending in her authority. He resigned in March 1944. At this event, the entire faculty resigned en masse.

Starting in June 1944, during World War II, the campus was adapted to serve as the Old Farms Convalescent Hospital for blind veterans. Riddle died in 1946, and the hospital wound down in 1947. In 1948, the Avon Old Farms School resumed operation under Provost Donald W. Pierpoint.

The campus has been identified as a priority for nomination to the National Register of Historic Places by the Town of Avon's Plan of Conservation and Development, but the school has not pursued formal listing.

== Architecture ==
Riddle designed the campus in the English Cotswold style, drawing on the Arts and Crafts movement. After a 1910 trip to England, she adopted 16th-century building methods and imported craftsmen from the Cotswolds to work alongside American laborers. Red sandstone was quarried on site, and Riddle established a blacksmith's forge on the campus to produce all hand-wrought hardware—hinges, latches, and lanterns—used throughout the buildings.

Riddle instructed masons and carpenters to "dispense with all mechanical methods" and "gauge all verticals by sight," reasoning that "a natural variation in line and surface was far more desirable ... than accuracy." The resulting buildings have swooping slate roofs, irregularly placed dormers, and massive chimneys with textured stone walls. Time described the campus in 1944 as having "roofs carefully warped and steps synthetically worn."

The campus is organized around two quadrangles—the Pope Quadrangle and the Brooks Quadrangle—along with a village green and a grouping of service buildings known as the Farm Group, which includes the Forge, the Water Tower, and the Chapel (originally the Carpenter's Shop, converted in 1948). The campus is documented by the Historic American Buildings Survey (HABS CT-474).

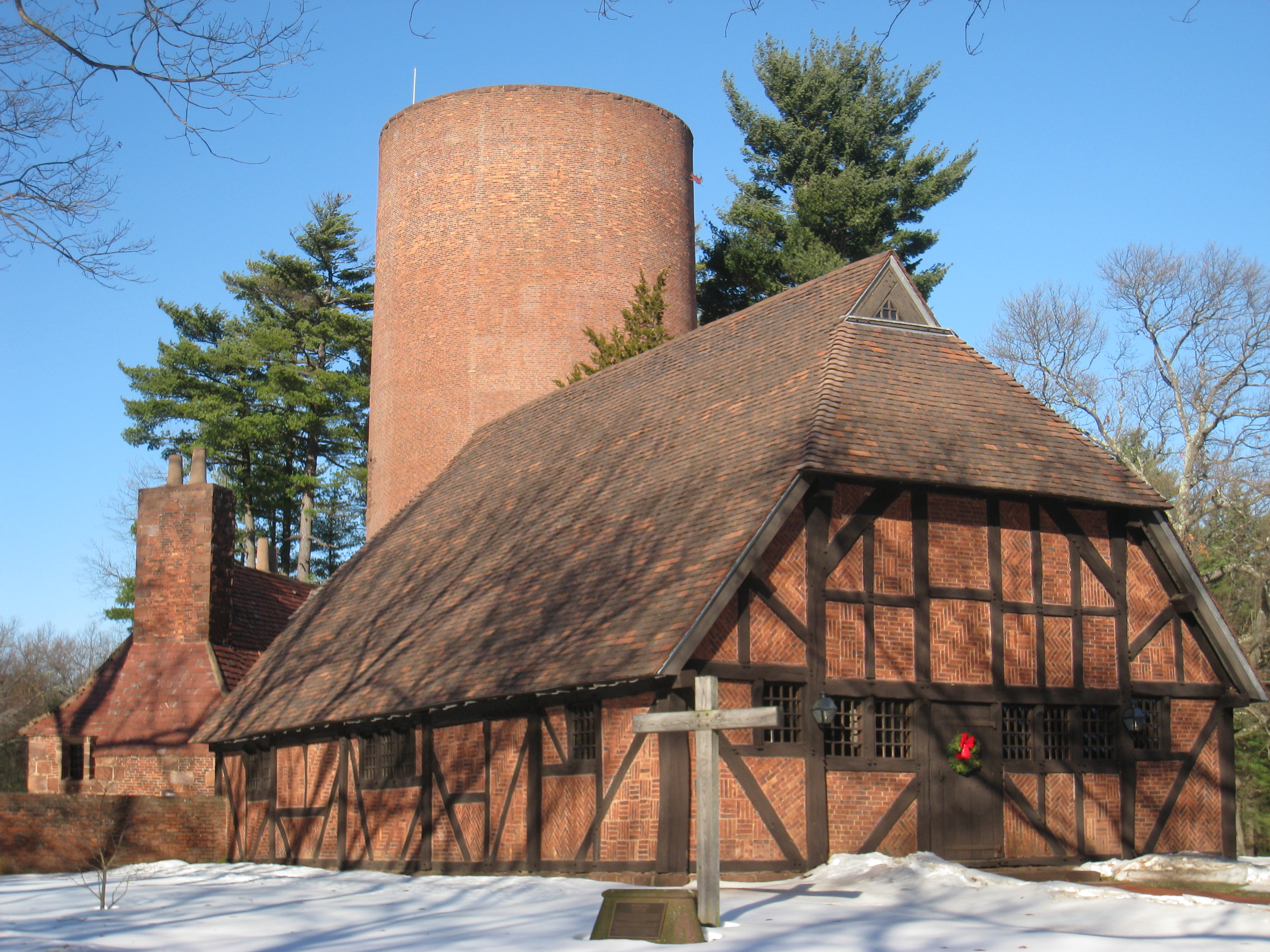
The chapel, originally the Carpenter's Shop, converted in 1948

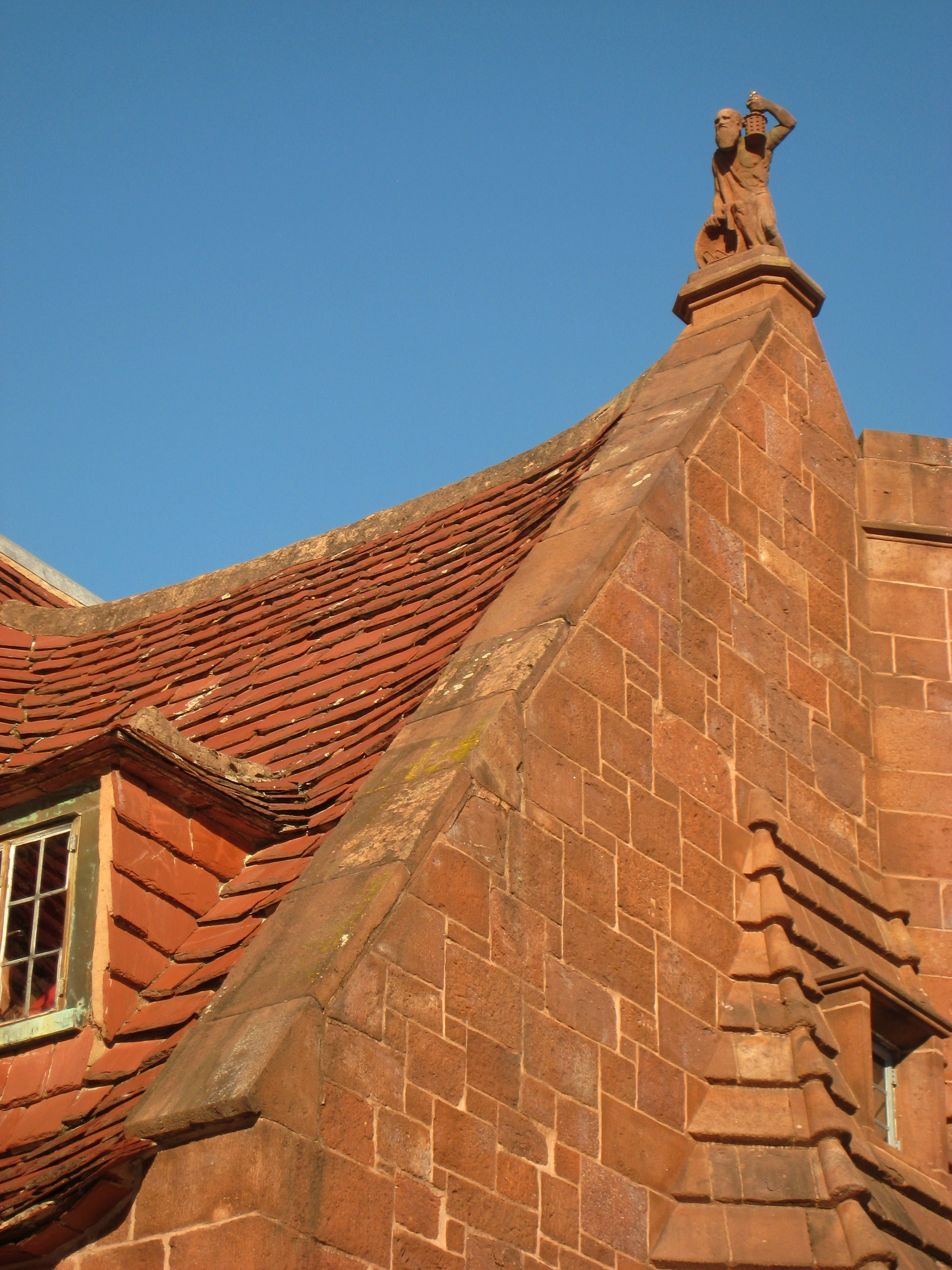
Diogenes sculpture, a detail of the Pope Quadrangle

== Athletics ==
Avon Old Farms is a member of the Founders League. The school fields 36 interscholastic teams across 15 varsity sports.

=== Ice hockey ===
Under head coach John Gardner, who coached at Avon Old Farms for 50 years beginning in 1975, the team won nine New England Prep Division I championships and 13 Founders League titles. Gardner compiled an 867–288–55 record, making him the winningest prep school hockey coach in New England history. The school hosts the annual Avon Old Farms Christmas Classic, a round-robin tournament running since the early 1980s.

On December 21, 2009, Avon Old Farms and Taft School played the first hockey game at Fenway Park, on the rink built for the 2010 NHL Winter Classic.

Alumni of the hockey program who reached the NHL include Brian Leetch, Jonathan Quick, Nick Bonino, Cam Atkinson, Chris Higgins, Trevor Zegras, and Spencer Knight.

=== Football ===
In 2025, the football team won the NEPSAC Class A championship with a 10–0 record, capturing the Drew Gamere Bowl.

== Notable alumni ==
- Deon Anderson, former NFL player
- Ryan Cusick, baseball pitcher in the Philadelphia Phillies organization
- Hudson Haskin, baseball player
- Stephen Lash, chairman of Christie's New York
- John Gillespie Magee Jr., Anglo-American poet and author of "High Flight"
- Daniel New, professional ice hockey defenceman
- Juan Nieves, former professional baseball player and pitching coach for the 2013 World Series Champion Red Sox
- Michael Nouri, actor who played Dr. Neil Roberts on The O.C.
- Ryan Puglisi, college football quarterback
- Jonathan Quick, professional ice hockey goaltender for the New York Rangers
- Casey Rogers, professional American football player, currently plays defensive tackle for the New York Giants, attended college at the University of Nebraska Nebraska Cornhuskers and the Oregon Ducks
- Pete Seeger, folk singer and activist
- George Springer, outfielder for the Toronto Blue Jays. World Series Champion and World Series MVP with the 2017 Houston Astros
- Richard Yates, novelist and short story writer
