= Ian Boyden =

American artist (born 1971)

- Born: February 16, 1971 (age 55)
- Education: Wesleyan University; Yale University
- Occupation: Artist
- Spouse: Jennifer Oakes
- Father: Frank Boyden
- Website: Official website

Ian H. Boyden (born February 16, 1971) is a contemporary American painter, sculptor, and book artist, known for the paints and inks he makes from materials such as meteorites, shark teeth, and freshwater pearls. His paintings are often abstract interpretations of how the pigment materials are understood according to historical, literary, and psychological contexts.

== Biography ==
Boyden’s early years were spent under the influence of the artist Margot Thompson, a student of northwest calligrapher and philosopher Lloyd Reynolds, and Boyden’s father, ceramic artist Frank Boyden. He earned a B.A. in Art History from Wesleyan University (1995), and an M.A. in the History of Art from Yale University (1998). In 1995, he received a Thomas J. Watson Fellowship to study the history of Chinese calligraphy as inscribed in stone.

Boyden’s scholarly and artistic interests in inkmaking are rooted in his discovery of ancient Chinese ink recipes. His inkmaking practice and scholarly investigations involve how ingredients function esoterically as well as practically in the resultant paintings. On the basis of his contributions to the study of ink, he was invited to be the 2011-2012 scholarly artist-in-residence for Suzhou University (Jiangsu Province, China). During that time, the Suzhou-based Jincheng Media Group invited him to be the 2012 artist-in-residence and to both produce paintings and install conceptual sculptures in the fish ponds of the site’s classical Chinese garden. The work culminated in a solo exhibition of books, paintings, and video at the Suzhou Museum.

Boyden’s artist books demonstrate traditional bookmaking practices of sewn bindings, wood covers, handset type, and letterpress printing. Other books depart from such tradition and apply the understanding of a book as a sequenced experience to objects like meteorites, which are sliced and set into a hinged binding so they can be "read" as both objects of scientific interest and structural interpretation. Boyden has collaborated with writers Sam Hamill (Habitations, Edible Earth, and Crossing the Yellow River); and Jennifer Boyden (Evidence of Night, and Twenty Views of Cascade Head); and artists Timothy Ely, Rick Bartow, Hua Rende, Ch’ang Chung-Ho, and William Balcom.

Boyden’s sculptures explore self-portraiture that he makes out of a variety of materials that are then given back to the environment to be completed by appetites of birds, bear, fish, and so forth. Boyden describes these pieces as explorations of Buddhist ecology. These self-portraits were the subject of his TEDx talk "'Eradicate the Self' Self-Portrait."

== Books ==
- The Tables of Jupiter: Graphic Work by Timothy C. Ely. Walla Walla, Washington: Donald H. Sheehan Gallery (Whitman College), 2004.
- Reflections on Forgotten Surfaces: The Calligraphy of Hua Rende. With contributions by Rende Hua and Qianshen Bai. Walla Walla, Washington: Donald H. Sheehan Gallery (Whitman College), 2005.
- Frank Boyden: Prints and Books. Co-authored with Prudence Roberts. Salem, Oregon: Hallie-Ford Museum of Art, 2006.
- Roots of Clouds, Transcendence of Stones. Co-authored with Jennifer Boyden and Terry Toedtemeier. Walla Walla, Washington: Donald H. Sheehan Gallery (Whitman College), 2006.
