= Sammy Yukuan Lee Lecture Series =

The Sammy Yukuan Lee Lecture Series in Chinese Archeology and Art is an annual program hosted by the UCLA Center for Chinese Studies in partnership with the Fowler Museum at UCLA at the University of California, Los Angeles (UCLA). It was established in 1982 to commemorate the 80th birthday of Sammy Yukuan Lee (1902–2011), a noted collector, dealer, and scholar of Chinese art. The series celebrates Lee’s philanthropy, his contributions to Chinese art and antiquities, and his enduring legacy in the study of Chinese material culture.

== Overview ==
Founded in 1982, the lecture series brings distinguished scholars of Chinese art, archaeology, and material culture to UCLA to present both public lectures and specialized seminars. These events are designed to engage academic and general audiences, enriching students, faculty, and the broader Los Angeles community, and assist with cross-cultural dialog and learning.

Born in Shandong province, China, Sammy Yukuan Lee became a prominent collector of Chinese lacquer, carpets, and ceramics. He later established a foundation and became a U.S. citizen in 1984. The Sammy Yukuan Lee Foundation continues to support the lecture series and other cultural programs at UCLA and beyond.

== Format and scope ==
Each year’s program typically features two main components:

1. A seminar, often aimed at graduate students or specialists in the field.
2. A public lecture, open to the general public, typically held at UCLA venues such as the Fowler Museum’s Lenart Auditorium or the Charles E. Young Research Library.

The subject matter covers a broad spectrum of Chinese art and archaeology, including:

- Bronze Age artifacts and excavations
- Lacquerware and decorative arts
- Buddhist art and iconography
- Architecture and landscape design
- Calligraphy and painting

Recent years have included both in-person and online events, with recordings available via UCLA’s International Institute YouTube channel.

== Previous Lectures in the Series ==
- 2025 — Greater Than the Forces of Nature? Humans as agents of China’s environmental changes 5000–2000 years ago — Tristram Randolph Kidder, Washington University in St. Louis
- 2024 — A Buddhist Sutra and the Belgian Mandarin — Foong Ping, Seattle Art Museum
- 2023 — Sanxingdui: Discovery of a Lost Bronze Age Civilization — Zhao Hao, Peking University; Discussant Rowan Flad, Harvard University
- 2022 — 40th Anniversary Program:
  - Politics in Collecting Chinese Art During the 1930s: “Chinese Temple” at the Nelson-Atkins Museum of Art — Wei-Cheng Lin, University of Chicago
  - From Tiananmen Square to Times Square: My Life, My Art — Hongtu Zhang, Independent Artist
- 2021 —
  - A Closer Look: Buddhist Art in Sixth-Century Shandong — Hsueh-man Shen, New York University
  - The First Neolithic Urban Center on China’s Loess Plateau: Discovery and Interpretation of Shimao Site, Shaanxi, China — Zhouyong Sun, Shaanxi Academy of Archeology
- 2019 — Xu Wei’s Calligraphy in Jail — Peter Charles Sturman, University of California, Santa Barbara
- 2018 — Early Images of Gods, Spirits and Demons in China — Alain Thote, Ecole Pratique des Hautes Etudes, Paris
- 2017 — Travels with Chaekgeori: An Art Historical Journey with Korean Screen Painting — Jerome Silbergeld, Princeton University
- 2016 — Allusions and Illusions: A Stroll through the Qianlong Emperor’s Garden — Nancy Berliner, Museum of Fine Arts, Boston
- 2015 — Calligraphy and Everyday Life among Late Qing Officials — Qianshen Bai, Boston University
- 2014 — Every Rock a Universe: The Yellow Mountains and Chinese Travel Writing — Jonathan Chaves, George Washington University
- 2013 — Chinese Architecture, Mongol Patrons, Asian Archaeology — Nancy S. Steinhardt, University of Pennsylvania
- 2012 — From Mementos to Masterpiece: The Chinese Collections of the Harvard Art Museums — Robert D. Mowry, Harvard Art Museums
- 2011 — Maritime Beijing: Oceans and Empire in the Monuments of the Capital — Jonathan Hay, Institute of Fine Arts, New York University
- 2010 — Anyang Archaeology in the 21st Century: New Perspectives in the Search for the Shang Civilization — Tang Jigen, Chinese Academy of Social Sciences
- 2009 — The Buddhist Arts of Tea in Medieval China — James A. Benn, McMaster University
- 2008 — Burning the Books and Killing the Scholars: Representing the Atrocities of the First Emperor of China — Anthony Barbieri-Low, University of California, Santa Barbara
- 2007 — Forty-eight Buddhas of Measureless Life: Court Eunuch Patronage at the Sculpture Grottoes of Longmen — Amy McNair, The University of Kansas
- 2006 — Poet Prince and River Nymph: The “Luoshenfu” in Verse and Painting — Roderick Whitfield, University of London
- 2005 — Recarving China’s Past: “Wu Family Shrines” and the Story of the Stones — Cary Y. Liu, Princeton University Art Museum
- 2004 — Yuanmingyuan: The Garden of Perfect Brightness — a Mirror for the Last Dynasty of China — Che Bing Chiu, Centre de recherche sur l'Exreme-Orient de Paris-Sorbonne
- 2003 — Long-haired Monks? A Portrait of Two Chinese Buddhist Masters and its Many Contexts — Raoul Birnbaum, U.C. Santa Cruz
- 2002 — Daoist Arts of the Ming Court — Stephen Little, Honolulu Academy of the Arts
- 2001 — Ancient Bronzes from China’s Sichuan Province — Jay Xu, Seattle Art Museum
- 2000 — The Pictorialization of Paradise in Medieval Chinese Buddhist Art — Ning Qiang, University of Michigan
- 1999 — Snake, Stupa, and Sunset: The Making of a Chinese Landscape View Over a Millennium — Eugene Y. Wang, Harvard University
- 1998 — Extraordinary Luxuries in Gold and Jade: The Impact of Western Asia and the Steppe Area on the Imperial Court of the Han Period (206 BC–AD 200) — Jessica Rawson, Oxford University
- 1997 — Refashioning Marriage in Song China — Martin J. Powers, University of Michigan
- 1996 — Art of the Ming Dynasty in the Temples of Shanxi Province — Marsha Weidner, University of Kansas
- 1995 — Sunken Treasures: Underwater Archaeology in China — Yu Weichao, Beijing; Zhang Wei, Beijing; Zhou Chongfa, Wuhan; Tsang Cheng-Hwa, Taipei; Huang Yung-Ch’uan, Taipei; Liu Benan, Byran, U.S.; Porter Hoagland, Woods Hole, U.S.; Chou Hung-Hsiang, U.C. Los Angeles
- 1993 — Images of Women in Chinese Art — Ellen Johnston Laing, University of Michigan
- 1992 — Talking Pictures: The Story of the Wu Liang Shrine — Wu Hung, Harvard University
- 1987 — Some Chinese Bronze Mirrors: Visions of Paradise — Michael Loewe, Cambridge University
- 1986 — Nanyue and Wuyue Cultures — Huang Jinglue, Bureau of Museums and Archaeological Data, Beijing; Huang Zhanyue, Institute of Archaeology, Beijing; Mai Yinghao, Guangzhou City Museum; Shang Zhitan, Zhongshan University
- 1984 — Carved Lacquer of the Song Dynasty (AD 960-1279) — Yasuhiro Nishioka, Tokyo National University
- 1983 — The Emperor’s New Clothes: Reconstructing Seventeenth-Century Qing Dynasty Wardrobe — John E. Vollmer, Royal Ontario Museum
- 1982 — Copper Mining in Ancient China: Recent Excavations at Tonglushan — Xia Nai, Institute of Archaeology Beijing; Yin Weizhang, Institute of Archaeology Beijing

Of additional note, in 1990 the Sammy Yukuan Lee Lecture Series in Chinese Archaeology and Art co-sponsored a separate International Symposium on Xia Culture at UCLA along with the UCLA East Asian Languages and Cultures Department and UCLA Center for Pacific Rim Studies with the following lectures:

- The Search for Xia Culture and Related Archaeological Discoveries — An Zhimin, Academy of Social Sciences, Beijing
- On the Chronology of Ancient China - Key Issues in the Search for Xia Culture — Zheng Guang, Academy of Social Sciences, Beijing
- The Last Years of Shang King Wu Din: An Experiment in Reconstructing the Chronology of Ancient China — Edward L. Shaughnessy, University of Chicago
- On the Authority of the Xia King and the Structure of the Xia State — Wang Yu-xin, Academy of Social Sciences, Beijing
- Xia Gun and Yu: Instauration of Patriarchal Dominance — Wang Yu-xin, Academy of Social Sciences, Beijing
- Xia Archaeology and the Investigation of the Early Development of the State — Tu Cheng-sheng, Academia Sinica, Taiwan
- Astronomical Data from Ancient Chinese Records and the Requirements of Historical Research Methodology — Noel Barnard, Australian National University
- A Critical Review of Fifty Years of Xia Archaeology and the Search for Xia Culture — Wang Chung-fu, Taiwan National University, Taiwan
- Was There a Xia: Problems in Historical Methodology — Sarah Allan, University of London
- A Chronology of China to the End of Xia — David Shepherd Nivison, Stanford University

== Significance ==
The Sammy Yukuan Lee Lecture Series has positioned UCLA as a major hub for scholarship in Chinese art and archaeology, fostering dialogue between international experts, local faculty, and students. It bridges academic and public audiences, influencing research, museum curation, and cross-disciplinary exchange in art history, archaeology, and environmental history. Through its endowment by the Sammy Yukuan Lee Foundation, the program maintains continuity and prestige, drawing high-profile speakers and producing lasting resources such as lecture recordings and transcripts.

== Participation ==
Members of the public and UCLA community may attend by RSVPing via the UCLA Center for Chinese Studies event page. Seminars may have limited seating, while public lectures are typically free and open to all. Recordings of past lectures are occasionally available on the UCLA International Institute YouTube channel.

== See also ==
- Sammy Yukuan Lee
- Sammy Yukuan Lee Foundation
- Fowler Museum at UCLA
- Chinese art
