= Jennifer Oakes =

Jennifer Oakes may refer to:

- Jennifer Oakes (poet)
- Jennifer Oakes (volleyball)

== See also ==
- Jenny Oaks Baker, née Oaks, American violinist
