= Theodore Roosevelt Birthplace National Historic Site =

Historic building in Manhattan, New York

- Theodore Roosevelt Birthplace
- U.S. National Register of Historic Places
- U.S. National Historic Site
- New York State Register of Historic Places
- New York City Landmark
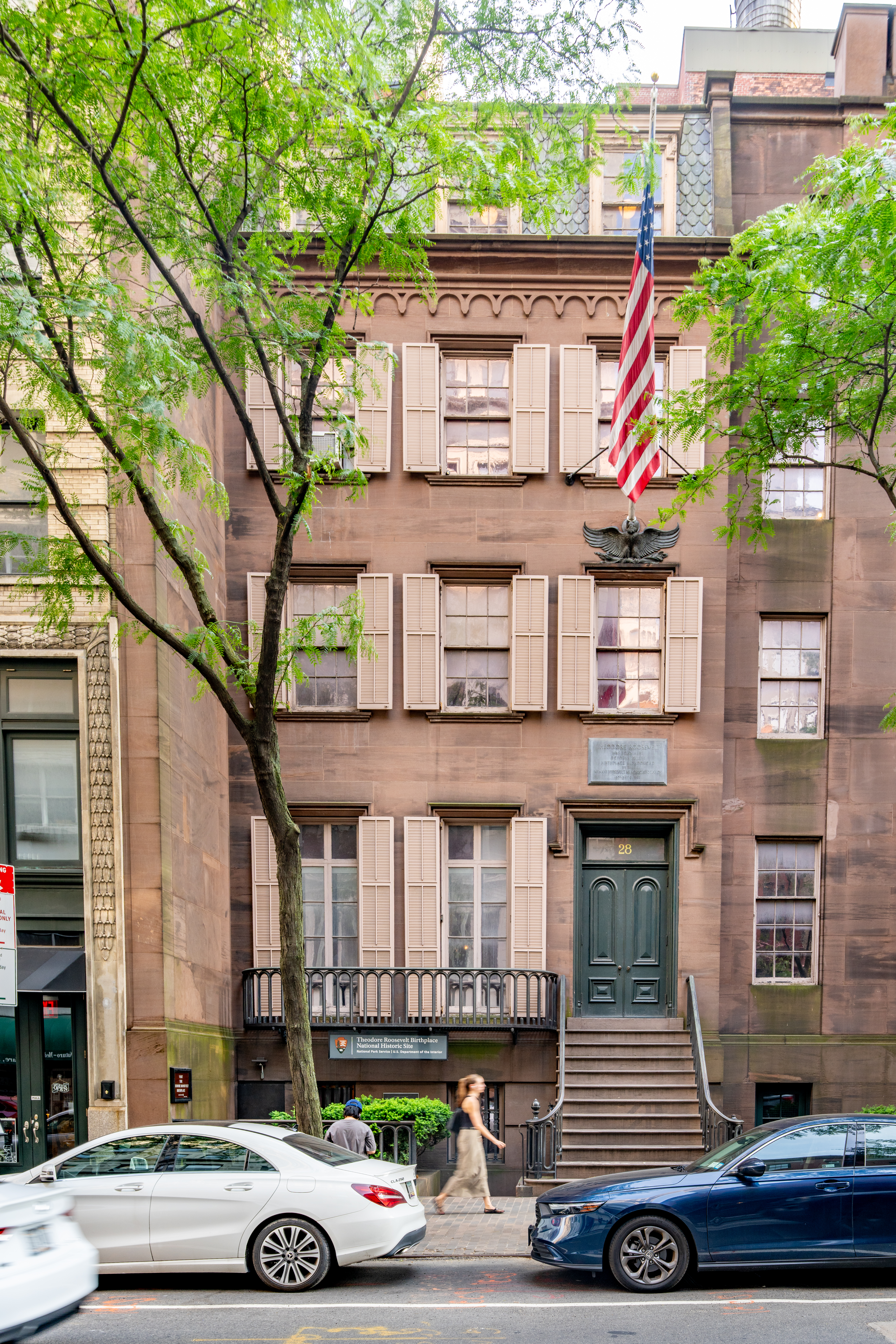
- (2025)
- Location: 28 East 20th Street; New York, New York, U.S.
- Coordinates: 40°44′19.7″N 73°59′20″W
- Area: 0.11 acres (0.045 ha)
- Built: 1848 (demolished 1916) rebuilt 1923 (replica)
- Architect: Theodate Pope Riddle (replica)
- Visitation: 26,864 (2025)
- Website: Theodore Roosevelt Birthplace National Historic Site
- NRHP reference No.: 66000054
- NYSRHP No.: 06101.000042
- NYCL No.: 0218

Significant dates
- Added to NRHP: October 15, 1966
- Designated NYSRHP: June 23, 1980
- Designated NYCL: March 15, 1966

Theodore Roosevelt Birthplace National Historic Site is a recreated brownstone at 28 East 20th Street, between Broadway and Park Avenue South, in the Flatiron District of Manhattan, New York City. It is a replica of the birthplace and childhood home of 26th president of the United States, Theodore Roosevelt.

== History ==
The house that originally stood on the site was built in 1848 and was bought by the Roosevelts in 1854. Theodore Roosevelt was born there on October 27, 1858, and lived in the house with his family until 1872, when the neighborhood began to become more commercial and the family moved uptown to 6 West 57th Street.

The original building was demolished in 1916 to make way for retail space, but upon the death of Roosevelt in 1919 the lot was purchased and the house rebuilt by the Women's Roosevelt Memorial Association, which eventually merged with the Roosevelt Memorial Association in 1953 to form the Theodore Roosevelt Association. Noted female American architect Theodate Pope Riddle was given the task of reconstructing a replica of the house, as well as designing the museum, situated next door, that serves to complete the site. The row house next door at number 26, which was a twin to the Roosevelts', was used as a model, and some architectural elements from it were incorporated into the replica. The twin house was demolished to make space for the museum. The restoration recreates the house as it was in 1865.

The house was rededicated in 1923 and was subsequently refurbished with many furnishings from the original house by the President's widow, Edith, and his two sisters. The widow and sisters also supplied information about the interior's appearance during Roosevelt's residency.

The Theodore Roosevelt Association donated the birthplace to the National Park Service in 1963. As a National Historic Site, it was automatically listed on the National Register of Historic Places at its creation on October 15, 1966. It now serves as a museum dedicated to the life and contributions of the 26th president of the United States.

== Roosevelt's recollection ==
Roosevelt described his memories of the home's interior in Chapter 1 of his 1913 autobiography:

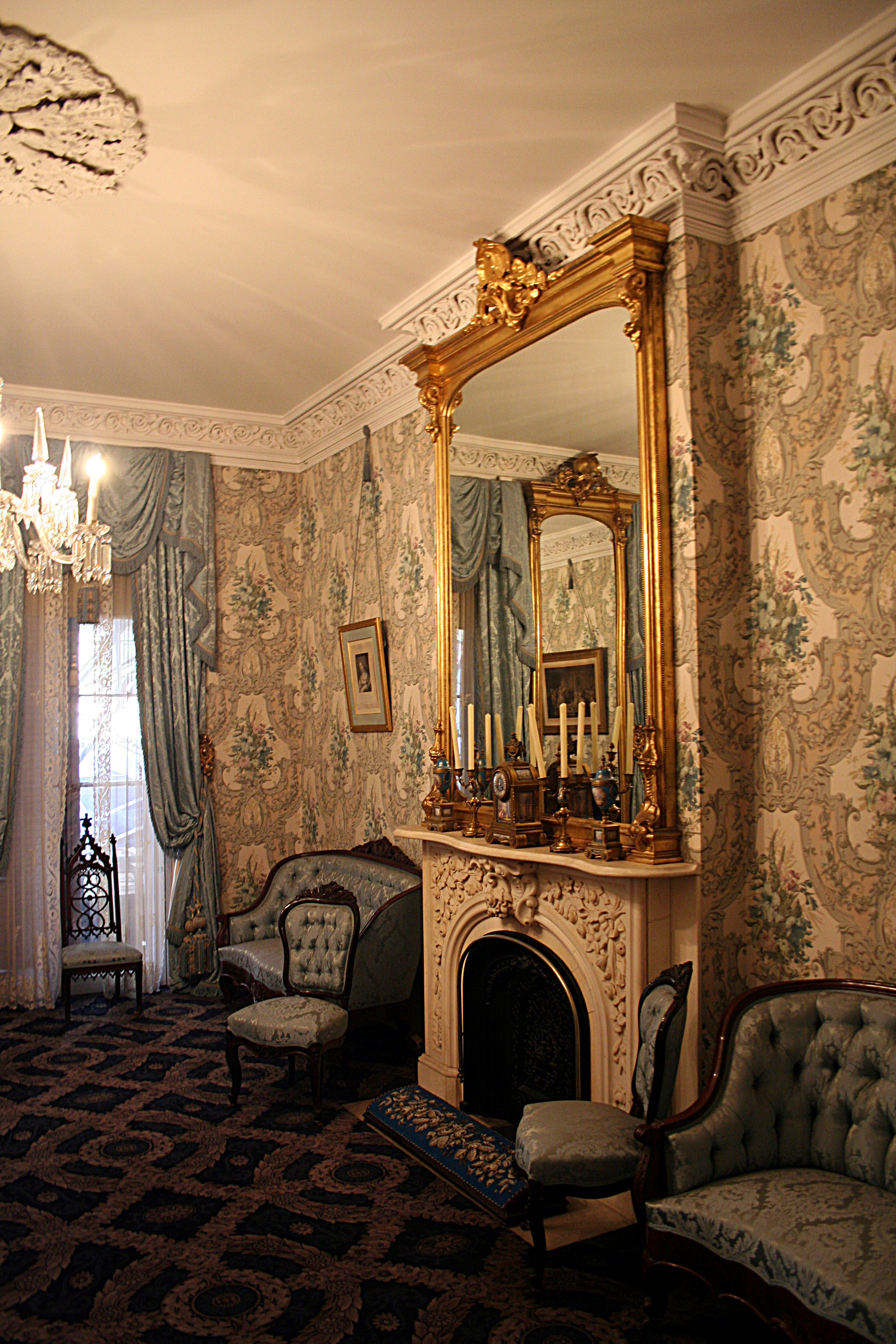
Sitting room

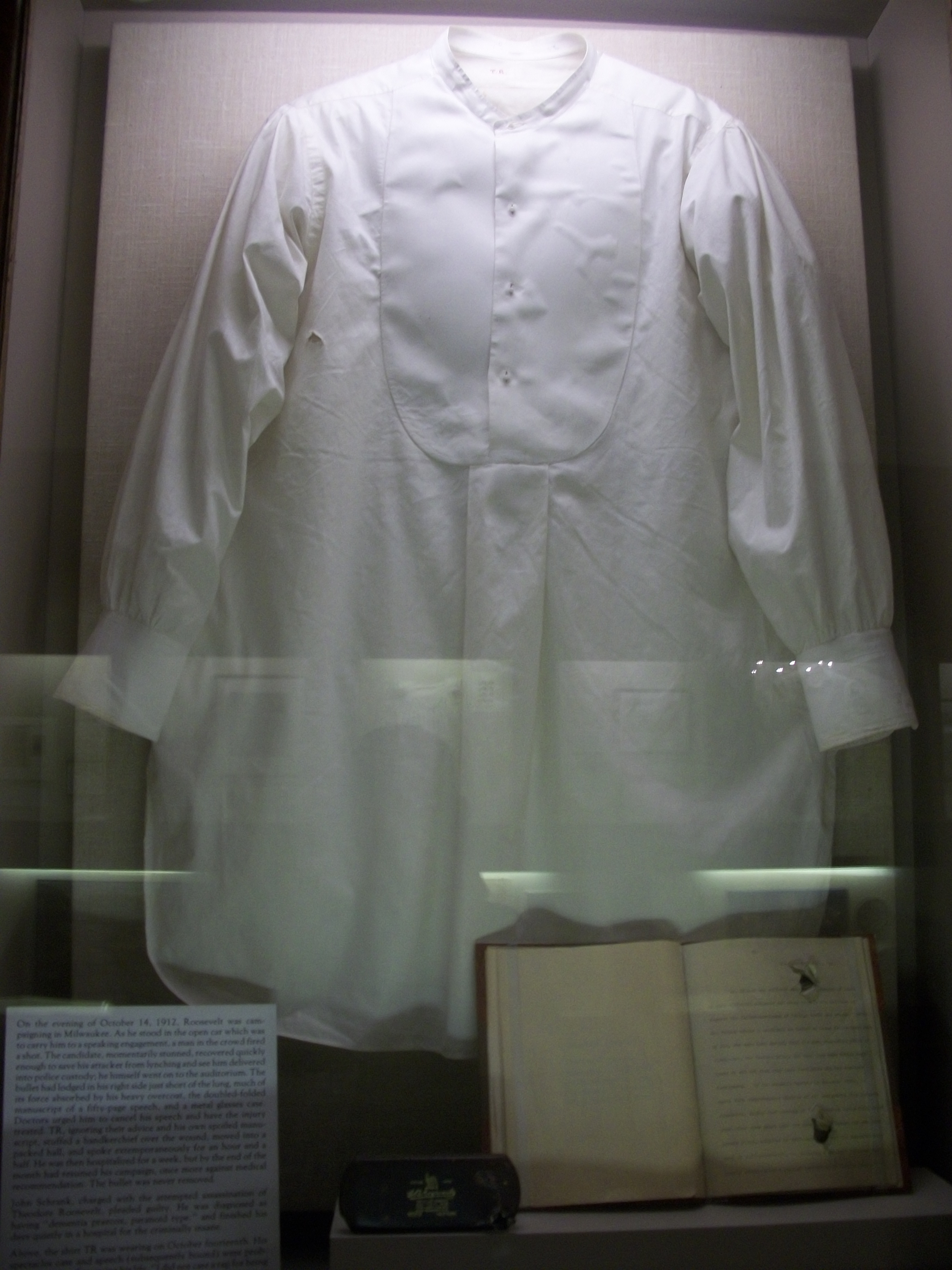
The home features an array of items from pivotal moments in Roosevelt's life, including the bullet-pierced shirt and speech from the 1912 assassination attempt.

On October 27, 1858, I was born at No. 28 East Twentieth Street, New York City, in the house in which we lived during the time that my two sisters and my brother and I were small children. It was furnished in the canonical taste of the New York which George William Curtis described in the Potiphar Papers. The black haircloth furniture in the dining-room scratched the bare legs of the children when they sat on it. The middle room was a library, with tables, chairs, and bookcases of gloomy respectability. It was without windows, and so was available only at night. The front room, the parlor, seemed to us children to be a room of much splendor, but was open for general use only on Sunday evening or on rare occasions when there were parties. The Sunday evening family gathering was the redeeming feature in a day which otherwise we children did not enjoy--chiefly because we were all of us made to wear clean clothes and keep neat. The ornaments of that parlor I remember now, including the glass chandelier decorated with a great quantity of cut-glass prisms. These prisms struck me as possessing peculiar magnificence. One of them fell off one day, and I hastily grabbed it and stowed it away, passing several days of furtive delight in the treasure, a delight always alloyed with fear that I would be found out and convicted of larceny. There was a Swiss wood-carving representing a very big hunter on one side of an exceedingly small mountain, and a herd of chamois, disproportionately small for the hunter and large for the mountain, just across the ridge. This always fascinated us; but there was a small chamois kid for which we felt agonies lest the hunter might come on it and kill it. There was also a Russian moujik drawing a gilt sledge on a piece of malachite. Some one mentioned in my hearing that malachite was a valuable marble. This fixed in my mind that it was valuable exactly as diamonds are valuable. I accepted that moujik as a priceless work of art, and it was not until I was well in middle age that it occurred to me that I was mistaken.

— Theodore Roosevelt

== Architecture ==
The three-story brownstone house features a mansard roof, and a high stoop above the basement. The hooded moldings above the windows and doorway are in the Gothic Revival style.

In 2014, Theodate Pope Riddle was recognized for her work rebuilding the home, a winning site of Built by Women New York City, a competition launched by the Beverly Willis Architecture Foundation during the fall of 2014 to identify outstanding and diverse sites and spaces designed, engineered and built by women.

== See also ==
- List of residences of presidents of the United States
- List of museums and cultural institutions in New York City
- List of New York City Designated Landmarks in Manhattan from 14th to 59th Streets
- National Register of Historic Places listings in Manhattan from 14th to 59th Streets
- Presidential memorials in the United States
