= Hudson Haskin =

American baseball player (born 1998)

Free agent
- Outfielder
- Born: December 31, 1998 (age 27); New York, New York, U.S.
- Bats: Right Throws: Right

Hudson Meagher Haskin (born December 31, 1998) is an American professional baseball outfielder who is a free agent.

== Amateur career ==
Haskin attended Avon Old Farms School in Avon, Connecticut, where he broke George Springer's school record for career stolen bases with 36. He was selected by the Oakland Athletics in the 39th round of the 2018 Major League Baseball draft, but did not sign and instead enrolled at Tulane University where he played college baseball for the Tulane Green Wave.

Haskin immediately became a starter in the outfield as a freshman in 2019 for the Green Wave. In 56 games for the team, he batted .372 with ten home runs, 52 RBIs, 19 doubles, and 77 hits. That summer, Haskin played in the New England Collegiate Baseball League for the Newport Gulls with whom he hit .306 with five home runs over 32 games and was named an All-Star. As a sophomore in 2020, Haskin batted .333 over 17 games before the season was canceled due to the COVID-19 pandemic.

== Professional career ==
=== Baltimore Orioles ===
Haskin was drafted by the Baltimore Orioles in the second round (39th overall) of the 2020 Major League Baseball draft. He signed with the Orioles for $1.9 million. Haskin did not play in a game in 2020 due to the cancellation of the minor league season because of the COVID-19 pandemic.

Haskin made his professional debut in 2021 with the Delmarva Shorebirds of the Low-A East and was promoted to the Aberdeen IronBirds of the High-A East in mid-July. He suffered a thumb fracture in August, forcing his season to end early. Over 83 games between the two affiliates, Haskin slashed .276/.381/.406 with five home runs, 42 RBIs, 22 stolen bases, and 19 doubles. He was assigned to the Bowie Baysox of the Double-A Eastern League to begin the 2022 season. In 109 appearances for Bowie, Haskin slashed .264/.367/.455 with 15 home runs, 56 RBIs, and 23 doubles.

To open the 2023 season, Haskin was assigned to the Norfolk Tides of the Triple-A International League. He played in 33 games before he underwent season-ending hip surgery. Haskin opened the 2024 season on a rehab assignment with Aberdeen and was reassigned to Norfolk for the remainder of the year. Over 101 games, he batted .212 with five home runs, 30 RBIs, and 22 stolen bases.

Haskin split the 2025 campaign between Delmarva, Aberdeen, the Double-A Chesapeake Baysox, and Norfolk. In 57 appearances for the four affiliates, he batted a cumulative .184/.290/.270 with two home runs, 21 RBIs, and four stolen bases. Haskin was released by the Orioles organization on January 28, 2026.

=== Gastonia Ghost Peppers ===
On April 3, 2026, Haskin signed with the Gastonia Ghost Peppers of the Atlantic League of Professional Baseball. He made nine appearances for the team, going 5–for–32 (.156) with four RBI and two walks. Haskin was released by Gastonia on May 4.
