= The Blue Wave, Biarritz =

Painting by James McNeill Whistler

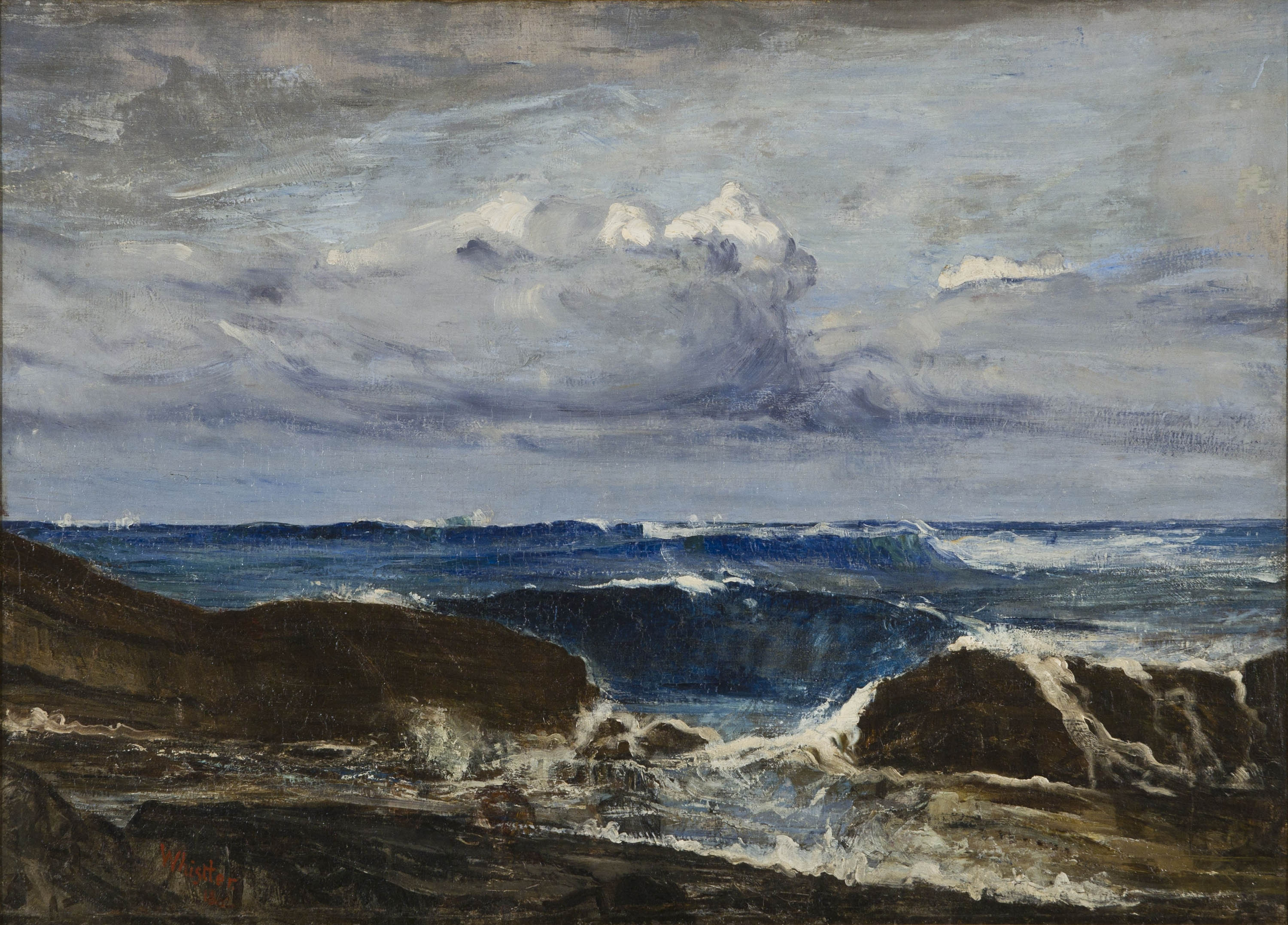
- Artist: James McNeill Whistler
- Year: 1862
- Type: Oil on canvas, landscape painting
- Dimensions: 61 cm × 87.6 cm (24 in × 34.5 in)
- Location: Hill–Stead Museum, Farmington

The Blue Wave, Biarritz is an 1862 seascapeoil painting by the American artist James McNeill Whistler. It depicts a view looking out to sea near to the resort town of Biarritz on the Bay of Biscay. It also known by the longer title Blue and Silver: Blue Wave, Biarritz.

Whistler had enjoyed his first success in London in 1860, but returned to France to paint in Paris and on the coast in Brittany. His submissions to the Royal Academy Exhibition of 1862 has met with a mixed reception. on his way to Madrid in October 1862 he stopped at Guéthary, and was at one point he was nearly swept away by the violent waves. He aimed to capture this experience in his picture. Stylistically it shows the influence of the Realist painter Gustave Courbet as well as Whistler's interest in Japanese art.

Whistler submitted the painting to the Royal Academy Exhibition of 1863, but it was rejected by the Hanging Committee. The painting is in the collection of the Hill–Stead Museum in Farmington in Connecticut.

== See also ==
- List of paintings by James McNeill Whistler

== Bibliography ==
- Jacobi, Carol (ed.) James McNeill Whistler. Tate Publishing, 2026.
- Sutherland, Daniel E. Whistler: A Life for Art's Sake. Yale University Press, 2014.
- Tinterow, Gary. & Loyrette, Henri. Origins of impressionism. Metropolitan Museum of Art, 1994.
