= Sammy Yukuan Lee Foundation =

US-based philanthropic foundation supporting Chinese culture

- 李汝寬基金會
- Formation: 1982
- Founder: Family of Sammy Yukuan Lee
- Type: 501(c)(3) private foundation
- Region served: United States (primarily California)

The Sammy Yukuan Lee Foundation is a United States–based private philanthropic foundation established in 1982 by the family of Chinese art collector and scholar Sammy Yukuan Lee (b. 1902, d. 2011). The foundation supports programs in Chinese art and archaeology, lectures and seminars, endowed library collections, and undergraduate scholarships, with a particular focus on the University of California, Los Angeles (UCLA) Center for Chinese Studies (CCS).

== History and Mission ==
The foundation was created in 1982 as a U.S. non-profit corporation in conjunction with Lee's 80th birthday; his family subsequently endowed programs at UCLA and other cultural institutions. The foundation's mission includes advancing the study of Chinese art, archaeology, and material culture through grants to universities, museums, and libraries; supporting public outreach and academic programming. The Sammy Lee Foundation has made generous contributions to art and cultural institutions in Los Angeles and elsewhere including the Los Angeles County Museum of Art, Tokyo National Museum, Shanghai Museum, Qingdao Municipal Museum and Shandong University.

== Support for External Programs ==
- Sammy Yukuan Lee Lectures on Chinese Art and Archaeology hosted annually by CCS in partnership with the Fowler Museum at UCLA.
- Sammy Yukuan Lee Family Endowed Collection for Chinese Archaeology and Culture at UCLA's Richard C. Rudolph East Asian Library (UCLA Library).
- New Perspectives on the Art of Ceramics in China symposium hosted by the Los Angeles County Museum of Art in 1989 in conjunction with the exhibition Imperial Taste: Chinese Ceramics from the Percival David Foundation.
- Rugs and Textiles of Late Imperial China hosted by The Textile Museum in 1994.
- Gardens, Art, and Commerce in Chinese Woodblock Prints hosted by The Huntington in 2016.
- Unscholarly Gardens: Rethinking the Gardens of China Symposium hosted by The Huntington in 2020.
- The Five Directions: Lacquer Through East Asia an exhibition at Los Angeles County Museum of Art December 18, 2022 – April 16, 2023.
- The Asian American Experiences in California Symposium hosted by The Huntington in 2023.

== See also ==
- Sammy Yukuan Lee
- Sammy Yukuan Lee Lecture Series
- Fowler Museum at UCLA
- Chinese art
- Philanthropy in the United States
