= Theodate Pope Riddle =

American architect

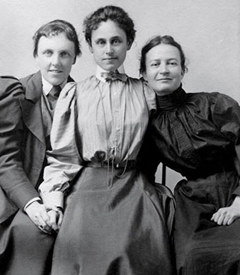
Theodate Pope, Alice Hamilton, and a student believed to be Agnes Hamilton, 1888. Courtesy of Miss Porter's School.

Theodate Pope Riddle (February 2, 1867 – August 30, 1946) was an American architect and philanthropist. She was one of the first American women architects and a survivor of the sinking of the RMS Lusitania.

== Life ==
Born Effie Brooks Pope in Cleveland, Ohio, she was the only child of industrialist and art collector Alfred Atmore Pope and his wife Ada Lunette Brooks and was a first cousin to Louisa Pope, the future mother of architect Philip Johnson.

When Effie was 19, she changed her name to Theodate in honor of her grandmother Theodate Stackpole. She graduated from Miss Porter's School in Farmington, Connecticut and later hired faculty members to tutor her privately in architecture. The first woman to become a licensed architect in New York and the sixth woman to be licensed in Connecticut, in 1926, she was appointed a Fellow of the American Institute of Architects.

She designed Hill-Stead, the family estate (now Hill–Stead Museum) in Farmington, and designed and founded the Avon Old Farms School in Avon, as well as Westover School.

Her best-known architectural commission was the 1920 reconstruction of the birthplace in New York City of former President Theodore Roosevelt. In the fall of 2014, Pope's work on that site was recognized in a competition, Built by Women New York City, launched by the Beverly Willis Architecture Foundation to identify outstanding and diverse sites and spaces designed, engineered, and built by women.

== Selected buildings ==
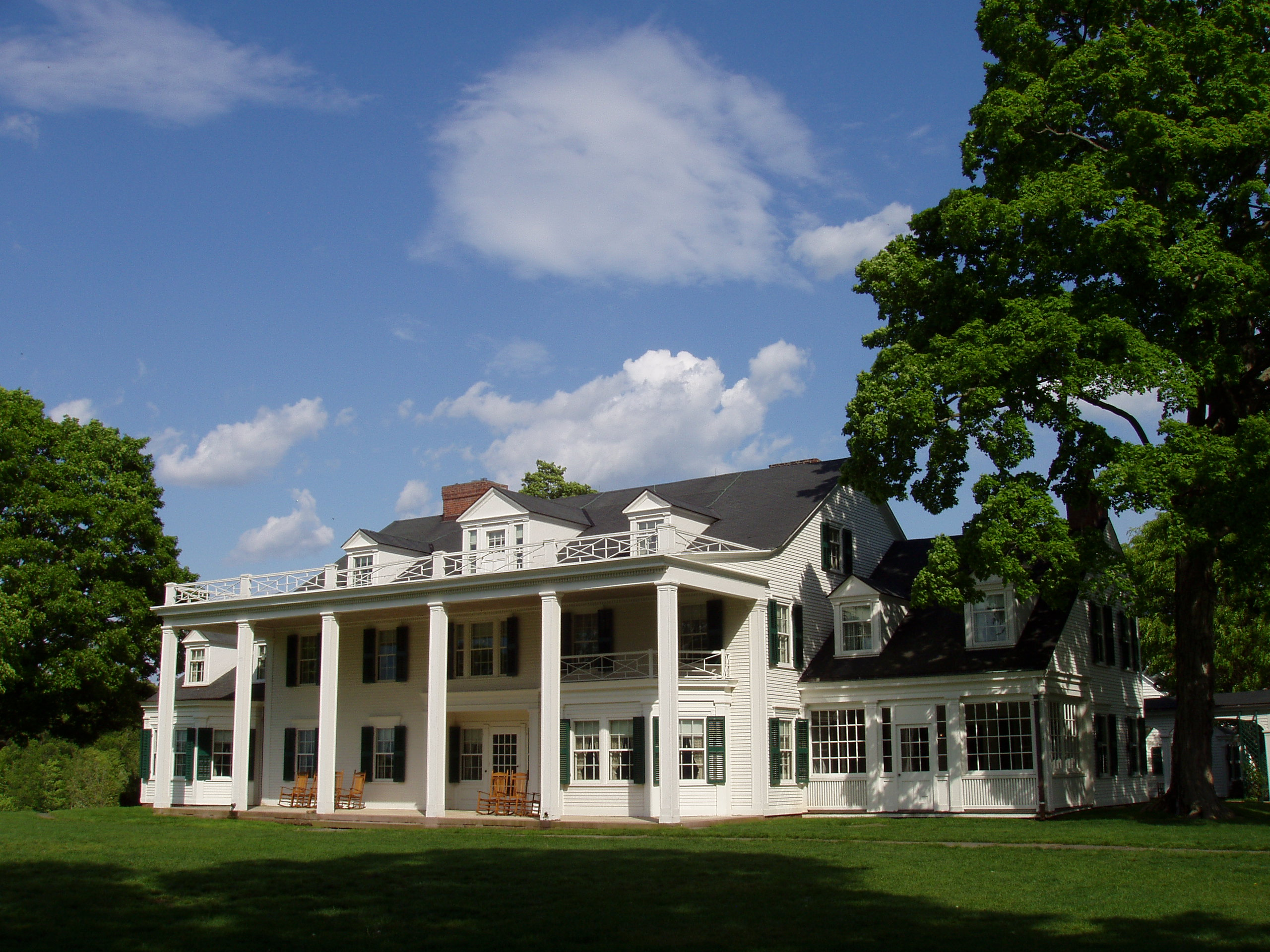
Hill-Stead Museum

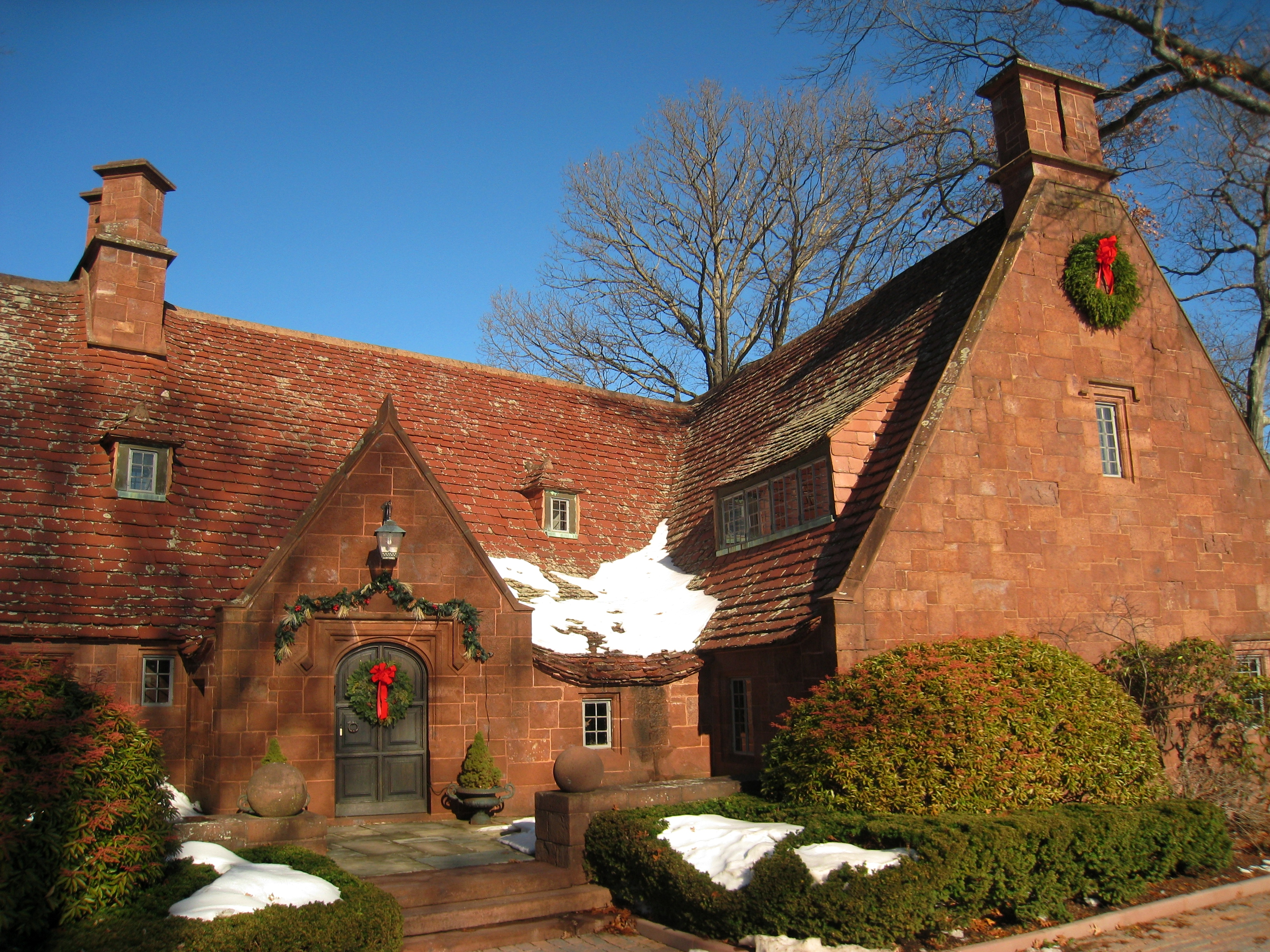
Avon Old Farms School

- 1898–1907: Alfred Pope House, Hill-Stead, Farmington, CT (with McKim, Mead and White)
- 1906–1909: Westover School, Middlebury, CT
- 1911–1914: Joseph P. Chamberlain Estate, Highfield, Middlebury, CT
- 1913–1914: Mrs. Charles O. Gates Estate, Dormer House, Locust Valley, Long Island, NY
- 1914–1915: Hop Brook Elementary School, Naugatuck, CT
- 1915: Worker's Housing, Farmington, CT
- 1918–1927: Avon Old Farms School, Avon, CT
- 1919–1922: Theodore Roosevelt Birthplace (reconstruction, interior restoration, design of adjacent building) New York, NY

Her papers are archived at Hill-Stead Museum, Avon Old Farms School and the Westover School Archives.

== Professional associations ==
Theodate Pope was a member of the Architectural League of New York, the Archaeological Institute of America, and the Mediaeval Academy of America.

== RMS Lusitania ==
On May 1, 1915, she boarded the British ocean liner RMS Lusitania as a First Class passenger, together with her maid Miss Emily Robinson and Professor Edwin W. Friend, a fellow Farmington resident. When the ship was torpedoed by an Imperial German Navy U-boat on May 7, Pope, Robinson, and Friend made for the lifeboats. The Lusitania's crew was inexperienced at launching the boats, and Pope saw one lifeboat tip all its passengers into the sea. Pope and Friend decided it would be better to jump from the deck. Before jumping, Theodate turned to her maid, saying, "Come, Robinson."

In the water, Pope was buffeted by debris and struggling swimmers. She was struck on the head by debris. "People all around me were fighting, striking and struggling," she later recalled. Then a man "insane with fright" made "a sudden jump and landed clean on my shoulders, believing I could support him."

She lost consciousness in the water, and when she was rescued, she was initially placed among the dead until another rescued passenger, Belle Naish, recognized signs of life in her. However, it took two hours before she could be revived. Neither Robinson nor Professor Friend survived.

== Personal life ==
On May 6, 1916, Theodate married 52-year-old John Wallace Riddle, a former American diplomat. Theodate took interest in parapsychology and was a member of the American Society for Psychical Research. She fell out with James H. Hyslop and resigned in 1915.

She died on August 30, 1946, at her home in Farmington.

== See also ==
- Women in architecture
