= Sammy Yukuan Lee =

Chinese–American scholar of antiquities (1902–2011)

- Born: October 14, 1902; Dalaowa Village, Zhaoyuan County, Shandong Province, China
- Died: September 9, 2011 (aged 108)
- Citizenship: United States (naturalized June 28, 1984)
- Occupations: Antiquities scholar; collector; author; dealer in Chinese art

Sammy Yukuan Lee (October 14, 1902 – September 9, 2011) was a Chinese–American scholar, collector, author, and dealer of Chinese antiquities. Known internationally for his expertise in lacquerware, ceramics, carpets, furniture, and other traditional art, Lee built a global reputation through decades of commercial activity and scholarship.

== Early life ==
Lee was born in Dalaowa village in Zhaoyuan County, Shandong Province, China, the youngest of five sons in a rural farming family. With only a sixth-grade formal education, as a teenager he was sent by his father Lee Quande to Beijing to apprentice in Ji Zhen Xiang, an antique shop owned by a Mr. Teng. There he met David Techun Wang (1905-2005), who became a lifelong business partner.

== Career in China and Hong Kong ==
During the 1920s and 1930s, Lee and Wang—rare among their peers in possessing a basic education—taught themselves English, German, and Japanese so they could communicate with foreign clients and expand their antiques business. Lee’s skill in identifying, restoring, and marketing Chinese antiques attracted European and American collectors, diplomats, and medical professionals living in Beijing. After recovering from a serious tuberculosis affliction in the mid-1930s—under medical care by Dr. and Mrs. Grand—Lee returned to work. Following World War II, he and Wang expanded their operations to Nanjing and Shanghai. Due to increasing political instability, they relocated to Hong Kong in 1947 and established Sammy Y. Lee and Wang’s Company Limited, specializing in Chinese antiquities and fine furniture.

== International expansion ==
In the 1950s, Lee founded Oriental House Ltd. in Tokyo, further attracting Japanese and American collectors. While his eldest son King Tsi managed the Tokyo branch, Lee traveled widely across Europe and the United States, organizing exhibitions. For example he established an art exhibition in Lempertz Gallery, Cologne, Germany in October 1960 and a large lacquer-art exhibition at the Royal Scottish Museum in Edinburgh in 1964, one of the first of its kind in the world.

== Scholarship and publications ==
In parallel with his business career, Lee devoted significant effort to research, especially in Chinese lacquerware, blue-and-white porcelain, carpets, and furniture. His English-language publications span exhibition catalogues, monographs, and technical studies, several of which have become important in the study of chinese art history.

== Selected bibliography ==
The following is a selected list of Lee’s works, under the names Sammy Yukuan Lee, Lee Yu-kuan, and Lee Yukuan.

- Ausstellung alte Chinesische und Japanische Kunst aus dem Besitz a catalog for an exhibition at Cologne, Germany on September 15, 1960.
- Ostasiatische Kunst. Katalog, Kunsthaus Lempertz Köln. Cologne: Kunsthaus Lempertz, 1963. Auction catalogue to which Lee contributed expertise on Chinese works of art.
- Catalogue of the Collection of Chinese Lacquer, as Exhibited in the Royal Scottish Museum, 1964. Edinburgh: Royal Scottish Museum, 1964.
- A Dissertation on Chinese Rugs. Archival lecture manuscript, Jan, 1966.
- Preliminary Study of Chinese Ceramics in Blue and White (Chʻing Hua). Tokyo: Deutsche Gesellschaft für Natur- und Völkerkunde Ostasiens, 1971.
- Oriental Lacquer Art. New York and Tokyo: Weatherhill for Oriental House Limited, 1972.
- Art Rugs from Silk Route and Great Wall Areas. Tokyo: Oriental House, 1980.
- A Study of Sung Underglaze Blue and Red Porcelains. Tokyo: Oriental House, c. 1982.
- Chugoku Seika Jiki No Genryu: So Gen No Sometsuke. Tokyo: Yuzankaku, 1982.
- Some Problems of Yuta Yao, Shuidong Yao, Bohai Yao, Tingchou Yao, and Hengfeng Yao. In Scientific and Technological Insights on Ancient Chinese Pottery and Porcelain. Beijing: Science Press, 1986.

== Later life ==
Lee became a naturalized U.S. citizen on June 28, 1984. He later lived in southern California, continuing his research into Chinese art—especially archaic jades—while visiting family in Tokyo and Hong Kong regularly. In his final years he returned to Qingdao, Shandong Province, living with extended family.

== Legacy ==
In the late 1980s, Lee's five sons established the Sammy Yukuan Lee Foundation at the University of California, Los Angeles (UCLA) to promote the study of Chinese culture and assist students of Chinese descent. The foundation later endowed the Sammy Yukuan Lee Lecture Series on Chinese Art and Archaeology at UCLA’s Center for Chinese Studies, which continues to support scholarship and public programming. The same foundational also supported programs at museums such as the Los Angeles County Museum of Art to acquire Chinese lacquer for over 30 years.

In 1996, Lee’s life and achievements were formally recognized by the Hon. David Funderburk in the 104th United States Congress as exemplary of discipline, foresight, and cultural leadership.

In 2009, in honor of Lee’s 106th birthday, the families of his five sons created the Sammy Yukuan Lee Family Endowment for Chinese Archaeology and Culture at the UCLA Richard C. Rudolph East Asian Library for the acquisition of books and other materials pertaining to Chinese archaeology and culture.

== See also ==
- Sammy Yukuan Lee Lecture Series
- Sammy Yukuan Lee Foundation
- Fowler Museum at UCLA
- Chinese art
