= Matthew Boyden =

Matthew Boyden may refer to:

- Matthew Boyden, a character from the British television series The Bill
- Matthew Boyden (cricketer) (born 1979), former English cricketer
