= Uriah A. Boyden =

American civil and mechanical engineer and inventor

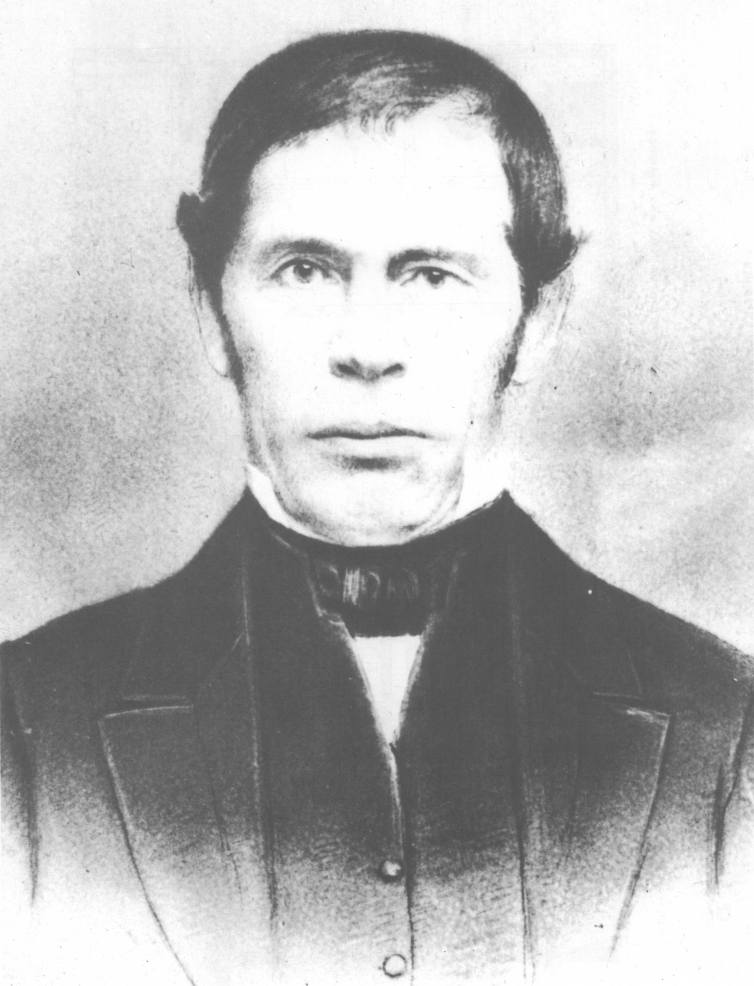
- Uriah Boyden, c. 1845
- Born: Uriah Atherton Boyden; February 17, 1804; Foxborough, Massachusetts, United States
- Died: October 17, 1879 (aged 75); Boston, Massachusetts, United States
- Occupations: Engineer, inventor
- Relatives: Seth Boyden (elder brother)

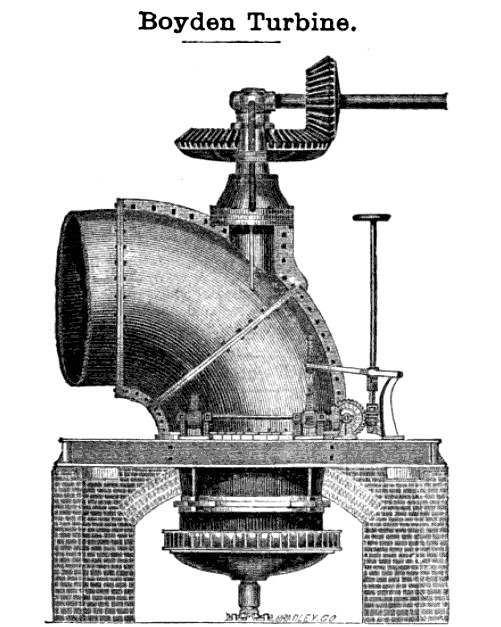
Boyden turbine

Uriah Atherton Boyden (February 17, 1804 – October 17, 1879) was an American civil and mechanical engineer and inventor from Foxborough, Massachusetts best known for the development of a water turbine, that later became known as the Boyden Turbine around 1844, while working for the Appleton Company in Lowell, Massachusetts. Boyden improved upon a turbine developed by French engineer Fourneyron by adding a conical approach passage for the incoming water—submerged diffusers, guide vanes and a diverting exit passage.

Uriah was also the younger brother of Seth Boyden, also a notable inventor who perfected a process for making patent leather, among other developments.

== Early life ==
Uriah Atherton Boyden was born in Foxborough, Massachusetts on February 17, 1804, the son of Seth Boyden and Susannah Atherton. His father was farmer and blacksmith who had invented a machine to split leather.

== Career ==
In 1813, Uriah moved to Newark, New Jersey to work in his elder brother Seth's leather shop. Around 1828, Uriah returned to Massachusetts where he worked on the early surveys for the Boston and Providence Railroad. He also worked under Loammi Baldwin on the dry dock at the Boston Navy Yard, as other mills in Lowell and the Boston and Lowell Railroad.

While at Lowell, Boyden worked with British-born engineer James B. Francis, who in 1848 developed the Francis turbine, which superseded Boyden's earlier invention. However, Boyden-type turbines continued to be manufactured, including those installed at Harmony Mills in Cohoes, New York in the early 1870s, and those used at the first Niagara Falls hydroelectric plant in 1895.

In 1850, Boyden settled in Boston, and devoted himself to the study of chemistry and physics. He never married. He died in Boston on October 17, 1879.

== Legacy ==
Upon his death in 1879, Boyden's will left about a quarter of a million dollars to a suitable astronomical institution that would build an observatory on a mountain for the better atmospheric seeing conditions than those available at lower altitudes.

His heirs challenged the will, but it was found valid. In 1887, Edward Charles Pickering convinced the trustees of Boyden's will to award the Boyden Fund to Harvard College Observatory, of which he was director. Although he initially planned to establish an observatory at Mount Wilson, those plans were abandoned (although the Mount Wilson Observatory was later built by a different group). Instead, needing an observation station for southern hemisphere skies, Harvard College Observatory established the "Boyden Station" at Arequipa, Peru in 1889.

In 1927, Boyden Station was moved to South Africa due to better weather conditions and became known as the Boyden Observatory.

Uriah also contributed to the Boyden Public Library in his hometown of Foxborough, Massachusetts. The National Museum of American History in Washington, DC is home to the Uriah A. Boyden Papers.

== Ancestry ==
His maternal ancestors had resided in Lancaster, Massachusetts, having been pioneer settlers to the area. He is a direct descendant of James Atherton, who arrived in Dorchester, Massachusetts in the 1630s. The Atherton family ancestry originated from Lancashire, England.

== See also ==
- Harmony Mills
