= Seth Boyden =

American inventor (1788–1870)

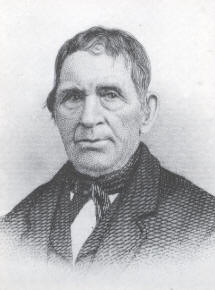
- Born: November 17, 1788; Foxboro, Massachusetts, United States
- Died: March 31, 1870 (aged 81)
- Occupation: Inventor
- Parents: Seth Boyden (father); Susannah Atherton (mother)
- Relatives: Uriah A. Boyden (younger brother)

Seth Boyden (November 17, 1788 – March 31, 1870) was an American inventor. Boyden perfected the process for making patent leather, created malleable iron, invented a nail-making machine, and built his own steamboat. He is also credited with having invented a cut off switch for steam engines and a method for producing zinc from ore. At the time of his death, he told friends that he had, even at that time, enough experiments on hand to last two whole lifetimes.

== Early life ==
He was born in Foxboro, Massachusetts, on November 17, 1788, the son of Seth Boyden and Susannah Atherton. His father was a farmer and blacksmith. His younger brother was Uriah A. Boyden. His maternal ancestors had resided in Lancaster, Massachusetts, having been pioneer settlers to the area. He is a direct descendant of James Atherton, who arrived in Dorchester, Massachusetts, in the 1630s. The Atherton family ancestry originated from Lancashire, England.

== Career ==
He worked as a watchmaker and moved to Newark, New Jersey.

In 1818, Boyden received a piece of German manufactured high-gloss leather (said to be a German military cap front) from a local carriage manufacturer and used that to investigate the possibility of creating a version of leather in the United States that was treated in such a way that the material would be decidedly more dressy than work boots and similar leather goods, but retained its desirable qualities of protection and durability. To reverse engineer the European leather, Boyden set up a shed at the Malleable Cast Iron Foundry of Condit & Bowles at 25 Orange Street in Newark, New Jersey and ultimately discovered a way to produce his own patent leather. Using a formula that was based on a series of treatments using layers of linseed oil-based coats, the new shiny leather began commercial production on September 20, 1819. Boyden's efforts resulted in the production of glossy leather that quickly caught on as a complement for formal dress. Despite its name, Boyden never patented his process.

Boyden began his work with malleable iron in 1820, when he was 32 years old. From observing the behavior of iron that stuck to the walls of his grandfather's forge, he had developed a theory about the heat treatment of iron. He completed his research in 1826, and won an award ("Premium No. 4") from the Franklin Institute in Philadelphia two years later, who noted that Boyden's annealed cast iron specimen No. 363, containing an assortment of buckles, bits, and other castings, were "remarkable for their smoothness and malleability" and "the first attempt in this country to anneal cast iron for general purposes." This invention, now called blackheart iron, is one of the most important contributions to metallurgy by an American.

Several sources state that Boyden "made the first American daguerreotype" and this statement appears on a plaque at the base of a Boyden statue in Newark's Washington Park. While it has long been accepted that D.W. Seager of New York City produced the first daguerreotype in America, it is unclear which other Americans may have been experimenting with the process prior to a public display of Seager's daguerreotypes in the Summer of 1839. A daguerrean camera built by Boyden still exists in the collection of the Newark Museum.

Boyden rarely patented his inventions, preferring instead to take individual contracts and to build and sell off businesses. He did make large sums from this, but not enough to support his research and to provide for his old age. During the last 15 years of his life, Boyden lived in near-poverty in Hilton, New Jersey (now Maplewood, New Jersey) and developed a hybrid strawberry known as the Hilton strawberry.

Header

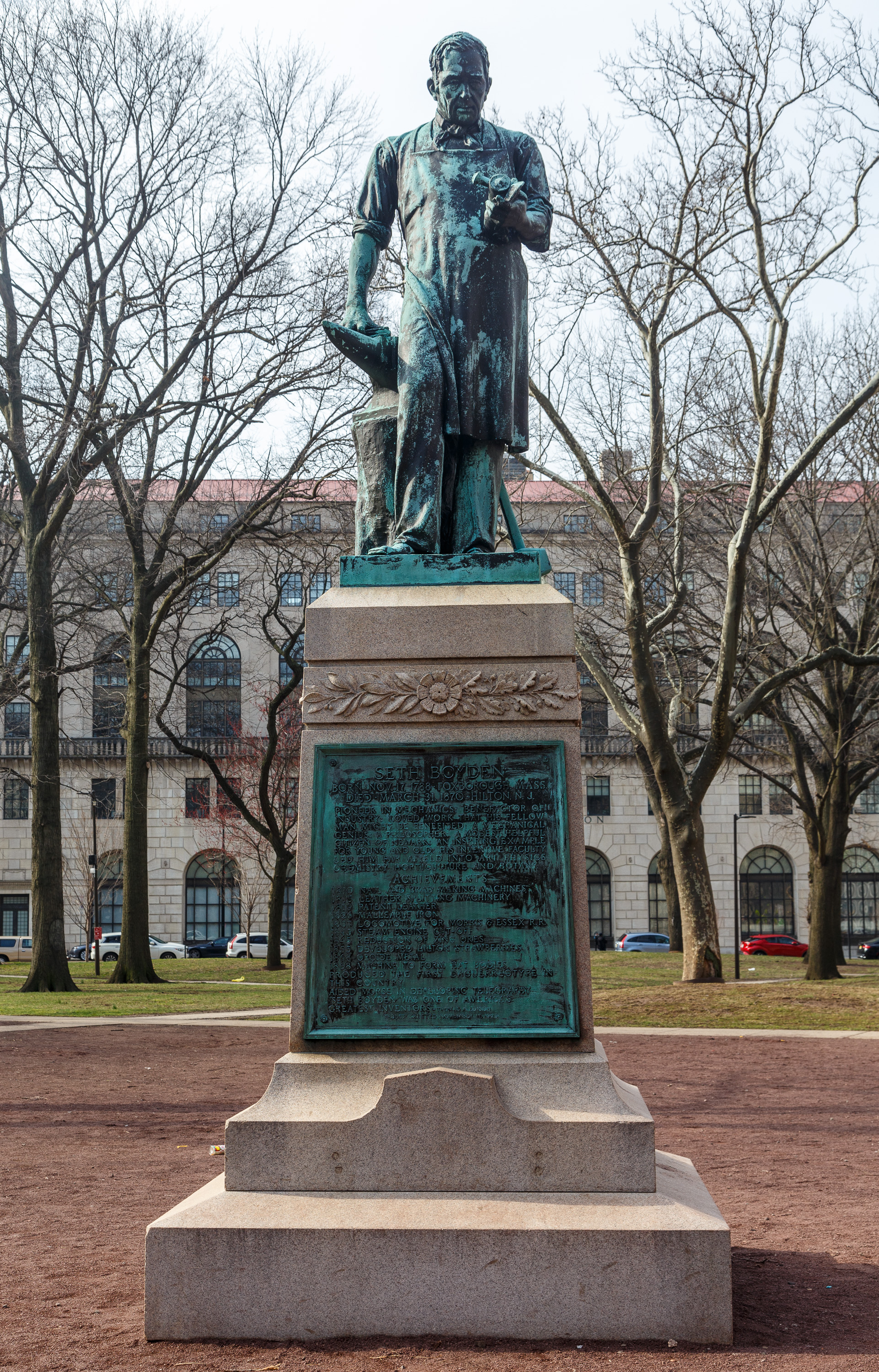
Statue of Boyden in Newark's Washington Park

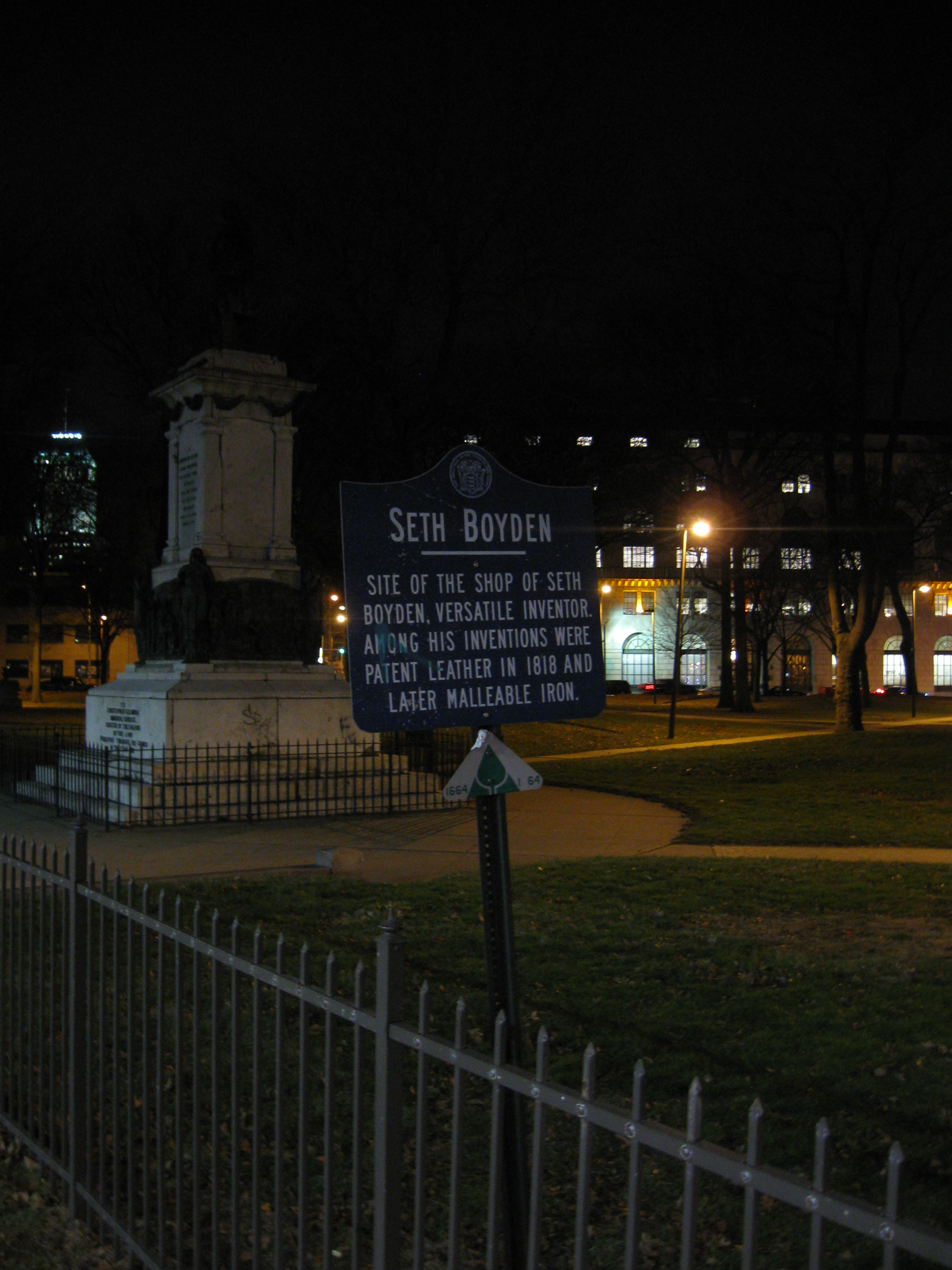
Site of Boyden's workshop

== Honors ==
Seth Boyden's name is found on an elementary school in Maplewood, New Jersey, and a complex of public housing projects in Newark, New Jersey. (See Seth Boyden housing projects).

Additionally, a statue of Boyden stands in Newark's Washington Park. This statue is the first one raised in the United States which honored an engineer.
