= Sally Boyden =

Sally Boyden may refer to:

- Sally Boyden (singer) (born 1965), Australian singer and actor
- Sally Boyden (cyclist) (born 1967), British track and road racing cyclist
