= Georgie Boyden St. John =

American composer

Georgia Harrington Boyden St. John (1861–7 April 1899) was an American composer, mostly of songs. She published her music under the name Georgie Boyden St. John.

St. John was born in Boston. She married Gamaliel Cyrus St. John in 1891 and they had four sons. She died in a fire in New York City at age 38.

Little is known about St. John’s education. She belonged to the Music Teachers National Association. Her music was published by Luckhardt & Belder, and included:

== Selected works ==
=== Instrumental ===
- Dance music
- March El Capitan (arranged by George Wiegand)
- The Maze

=== Vocal ===
- “Bonny Prince Charlie”
- “Cupid at the Oar”
- “In Dreamland”
- “Regret”
- “Second Bests” (text by Agnes Mary Smith)
- “Toujours Amour”
