= Linda Boyden =

American poet and children's book writer

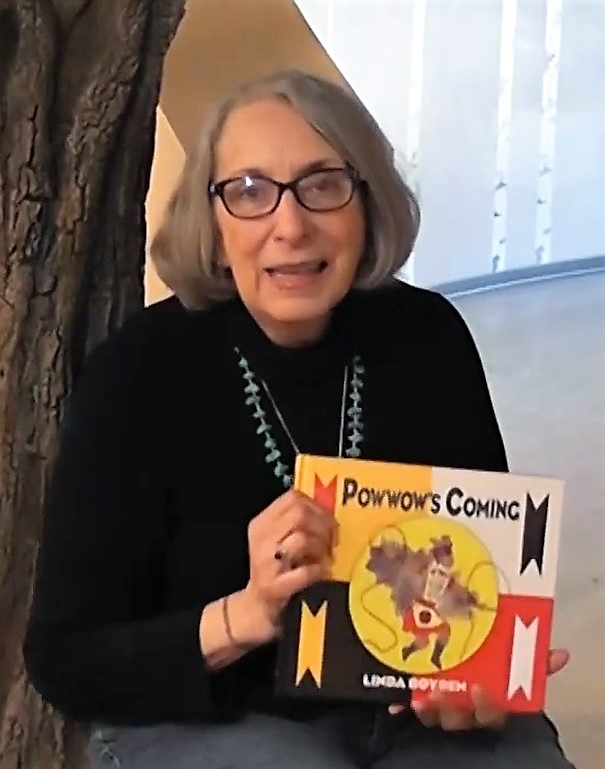
- Boyden with her book Powwow's Coming in 2020
- Born: July 6, 1948 (age 78); Attleboro, Massachusetts, U.S.
- Education: Framingham State University; University of Virginia
- Occupations: Poet; Children's books writer
- Years active: 1970–present
- Spouse: John P. Boyden (m. 1988)

Linda Boyden (born July 6, 1948) is an American poet and children's books writer.

== Background ==
Born in Attleboro, Massachusetts, Boyden is the daughter of Ray Simmons and Marie Dargis Simmons. She is of French-Canadian and Cherokee descent and is a member of the United Lumbee Nation. As a child, she told stories to her dolls and to younger children. Enjoyment of reading led her to wish that she could be a writer. In 1970, she graduated from Framingham State College with a bachelor of science in education degree. She received a master's of education degree from the University of Virginia in 1992.

== Career ==
Boyden began teaching first grade in a school in Baltimore in 1970 and taught "on and off" for 17 years. Her career focus shifted to writing after she and her husband moved to Maui in 1997. The first acceptance of her work by a publisher came in 2000.

== Awards ==
Wordcraft Circle named The Blue Roses its Book of the Year for Children's Literature. In 2000, Boyden won the Lee & Low Books first New Voices Award for her book The Blue Roses. The award was accompanied by a contract for publication and a $1,000 cash grant.

== Personal life ==
In 1988, she married engineer John P. Boyden.

== Books by Linda Boyden or containing her work ==
=== Children's books ===
- The Blue Roses, Lee and Low Books, 2002.
- Powwow's Coming, University of New Mexico Press, 2007

=== Anthologies ===
- Woven on the Wind: Women Write about Friendship in the Sagebrush West, Linda Hasselstrom, Gaydell Collier, Nancy Curtis (Editors), Mariner Books, 2001.
- Through the Eye of the Deer, Carolyn Dunn & Carol Comfort (Editors), Consortium Books, 1999.
- Maui Muses, Vol. II, edited by Maui Live Poets, 1997.
