= Qianshen Bai =

Chinese art historian (born 1955)

- Born: April 26, 1955 (age 71)

Academic background
- Education: Peking University, Rutgers University, Yale University

Academic work
- Discipline: Art history
- Sub-discipline: Chinese calligraphy
- Institutions: Boston University, Zhejiang University
- Notable works: Fu Shan’s World: The Transformation of Chinese Calligraphy in the Seventeenth Century

Qianshen Bai (born 26 April 1955) is a Chinese art historian. He attended Peking University before traveling to pursue postgraduate training at Rutgers and Yale University, receiving his PhD in art history in 1996. He taught at Boston University from 1997 to 2015, afterwards returning to China to serve as a professor of art history at Zhejiang University. He received a Guggenheim Fellowship in 2004. In 2019, he was appointed the founding Dean of the School of Art & Archaeology and the director of the Zhejiang University Museum of Art and Archaeology.

== Biography ==
Qianshen Bai was born in China on 26 April 1955. In 1982, while a student at Peking University, he won first place in the National Calligraphy Competition for University Students. He graduated from Peking University with a Bachelor of Law that year, before pursuing a postgraduate political science program. He travelled to the United States in 1986 to attend a comparative politics course at Rutgers University, where he graduated with his Master of Arts in 1990. He transferred to Yale University, where he received an MA in art history in 1992, as well as a M.Phil in the same field the following year. He was granted his PhD in art history from Yale in 1996.

From 1995 to 1997, Bai served as an instructor of Asian art history at Western Michigan University in Kalamazoo, Michigan. In April 1997, he became an assistant professor at Boston University. After Bai briefly worked as a visiting professor at Harvard University in the spring of 2002, the Harvard University Asia Center published his first English-language book, Fu Shan’s World: The Transformation of Chinese Calligraphy in the Seventeenth Century, the following year. He was promoted to an associate professorship at Boston in 2004. That year, he received a Guggenheim Fellowship for his work in arts research. He received an National Endowment for the Humanities grant in 2011–2012. While serving as a researcher in the United States, he additionally taught Chinese calligraphy.

In 2015, he returned to China to serve as a professor of art history at Zhejiang University in Hangzhou. In May 2019, Bai was appointed the founding dean of Zhejiang's School of Art & Archaeology. Later that year, he was also appointed the director of the Zhejiang University Museum of Art and Archaeology. He has also served as a visiting professor at Peking University.
