= Hill–Stead Museum =

Historic house in Connecticut, United States

Coordinates: 41.7222°N 72.8189°W

- U.S. National Register of Historic Places
- U.S. National Historic Landmark
- U.S. Historic district – Contributing property
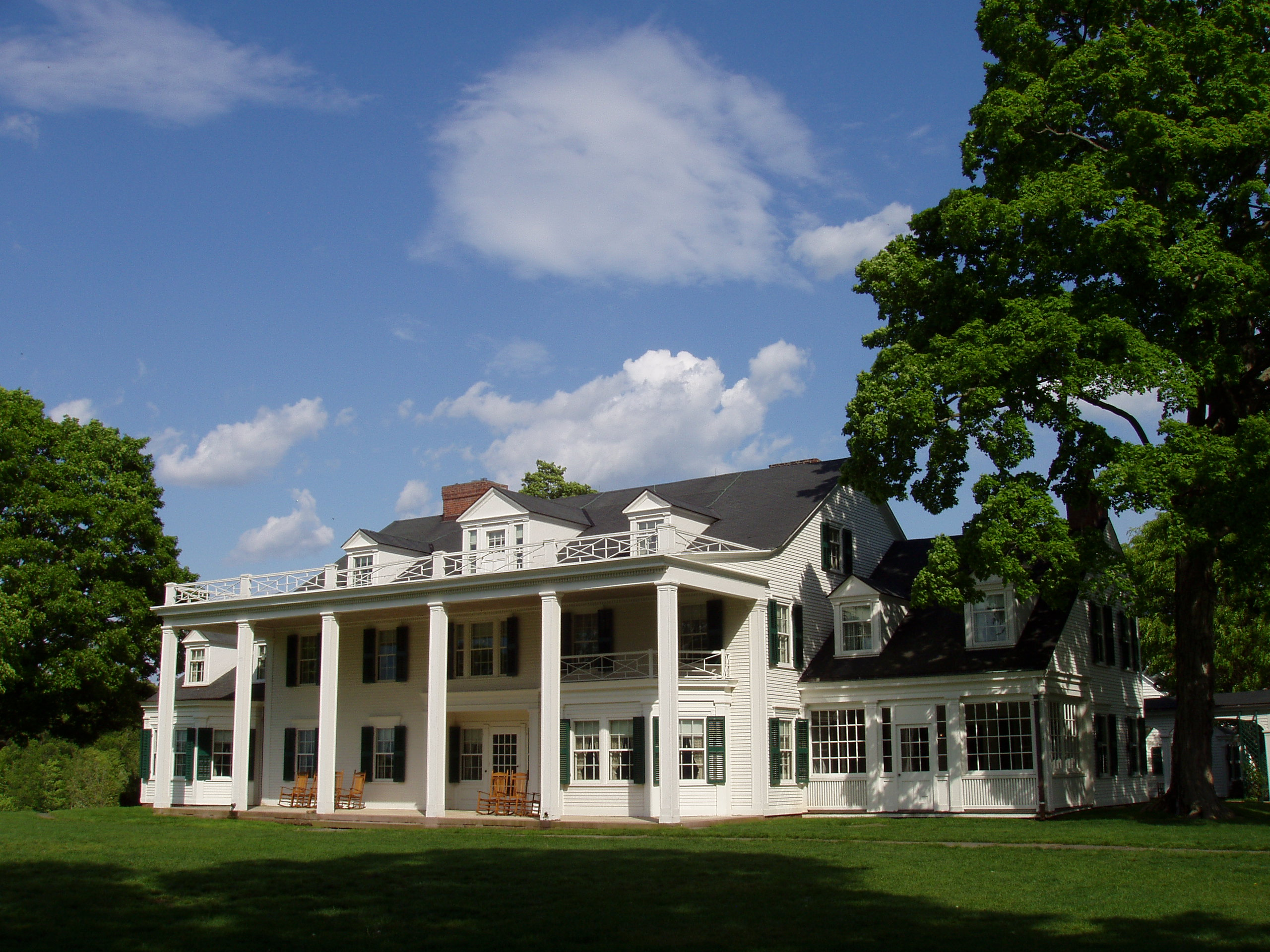
- Hill–Stead Museum

- Location within Connecticut Location within the United States
- Location: 35 Mountain Road, Farmington, Connecticut
- Area: 150 acres (0.61 km^{2})
- Built: 1901
- Architect: Theodate Pope Riddle in association with McKim, Mead and White
- Architectural style: Colonial Revival
- Website: www.hillstead.org
- Part of: Farmington Historic District (ID72001331)
- NRHP reference No.: 91002056

Significant dates
- Added to NRHP: July 17, 1991
- Designated NHL: July 17, 1991
- Designated CP: March 17, 1972

Hill–Stead Museum is a Colonial Revival house and art museum set on a large estate at 35 Mountain Road in Farmington, Connecticut. It is best known for its French Impressionist masterpieces, architecture, and stately grounds. The property was designated a National Historic Landmark as a nationally significant example of Colonial Revival architecture, built in 1901 to designs that were the result of a unique collaboration between Theodate Pope Riddle, one of the United States' first female architects, and the renowned firm of McKim, Mead & White. The house was built for Riddle's father, Alfred Atmore Pope, and the art collection it houses was collected by Pope and Riddle.

== House and museum ==
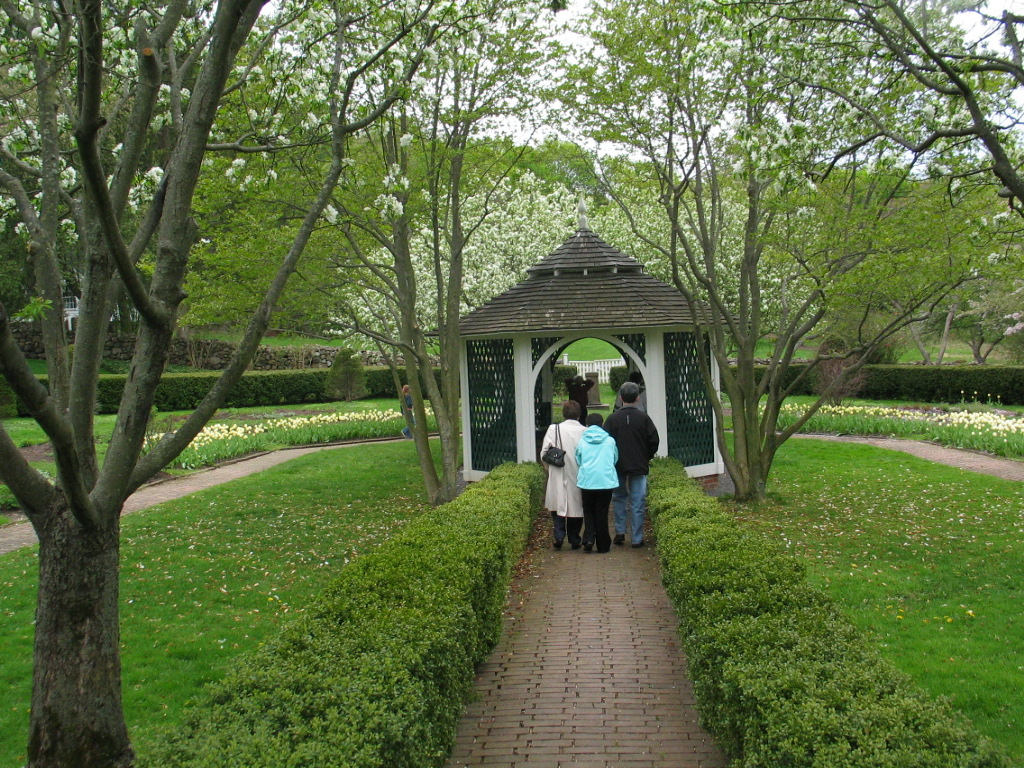
The picturesque Sunken Garden at Hill–Stead

Hill–Stead was created on 250 acres (1.0 km^{2}) as a country estate for wealthy industrialist Alfred Atmore Pope, to the designs of his daughter Theodate Pope Riddle. Egerton Swartwout of the architectural firm McKim, Mead, and White translated her design into a working site plan, and construction took place over the period of 1898 to 1901.

Theodate inherited the house after her parents' deaths, and prior to her own passing in 1946 willed Hill–Stead Museum as a memorial to her parents and "for the benefit and enjoyment of the public". She directed that both the house and its contents remain intact, not to be moved, lent, or sold.

Hill–Stead comprises 152 acres (0.6 km^{2}), the balance having been sold off during the first years of the museum's operation. Buildings which remain part of the property include the Pope-Riddle House itself (a large 33,000-square-foot (3,100 m^{2}) mansion built in the Colonial Revival style and once described as "a great new house on a hilltop" by novelist and occasional guest Henry James); an 18th-century farm house; a carriage garage with an Arts and Crafts theater; a barn and additional farm buildings.

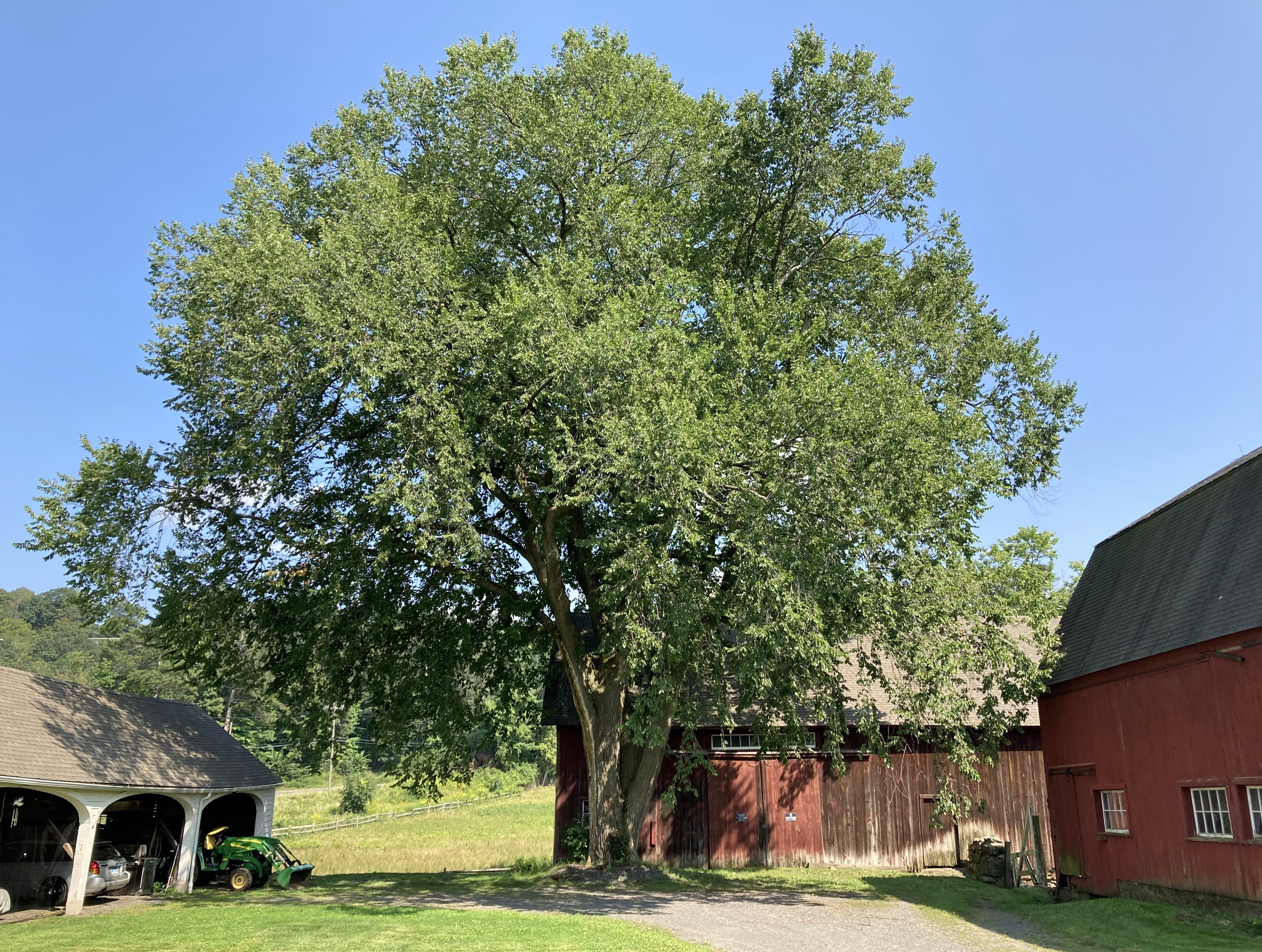
American elm and barns located on the property (August 2021)

Today, 19 rooms of the house are open to visitors. Remaining as it was at the time of Theodate's death, the house is extensively furnished with paintings, prints, objets d'art, and fine furniture and rugs. Highlights of the collection include major paintings by Eugène Carrière, Mary Cassatt, Edgar Degas, Édouard Manet, Claude Monet and James McNeill Whistler; prints including three engravings by Albrecht Dürer (Melencolia I, 1514), 17 copper plate etchings and lithographs by James McNeill Whistler, and Japanese woodblock prints by artists Katsushika Hokusai, Utagawa Hiroshige and Kitagawa Utamaro; eight bronze sculptures by Antoine-Louis Barye; about 13,000 letters and postcards including correspondence from Mary Cassatt, Henry James and James McNeill Whistler; and about 2,500 photographs, including six of Gertrude Käsebier's art photographs.

Hill–Stead's grounds were originally designed in consultation with landscape architect Warren H. Manning and feature a broad lawn with ha-ha and slate walkway; artificial pond; and formal, octagonal flower garden. Around 1920, landscape gardener Beatrix Farrand redesigned the estate's Sunken Garden (1 acre) at Theodate's request. Due to the wartime labor shortage experienced during the 1940s, the garden grassed over leaving only the summerhouse in place. Though it was replanted in time, it was not until the 1980s that the Sunken Garden was restored to exhibit Farrand's original plan.

== National Historic Landmark ==
Hill–Stead was declared a National Historic Landmark in 1991. The Hill-Stead has also been the venue of one of the longest running poetry festivals in the country, the Sunken Garden Festival.

== In popular culture ==
Hill-Stead was used by the show The Artist as the set location for the mansion of the main character.

== Gallery ==
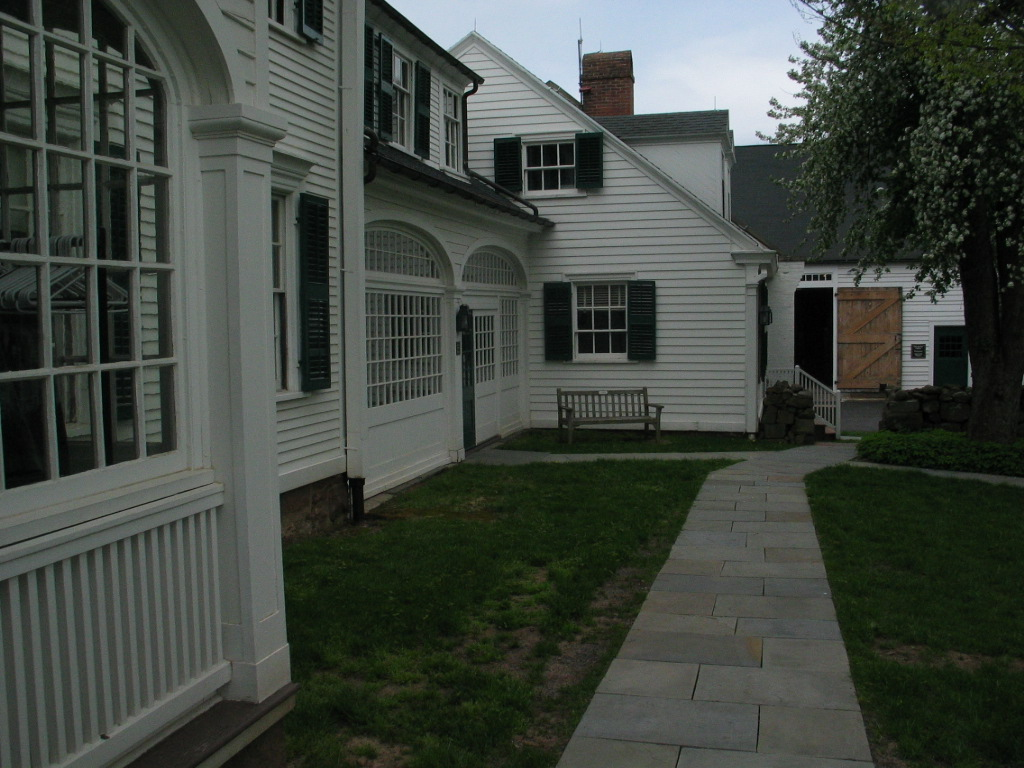
Hill–Stead Museum, South Side of House

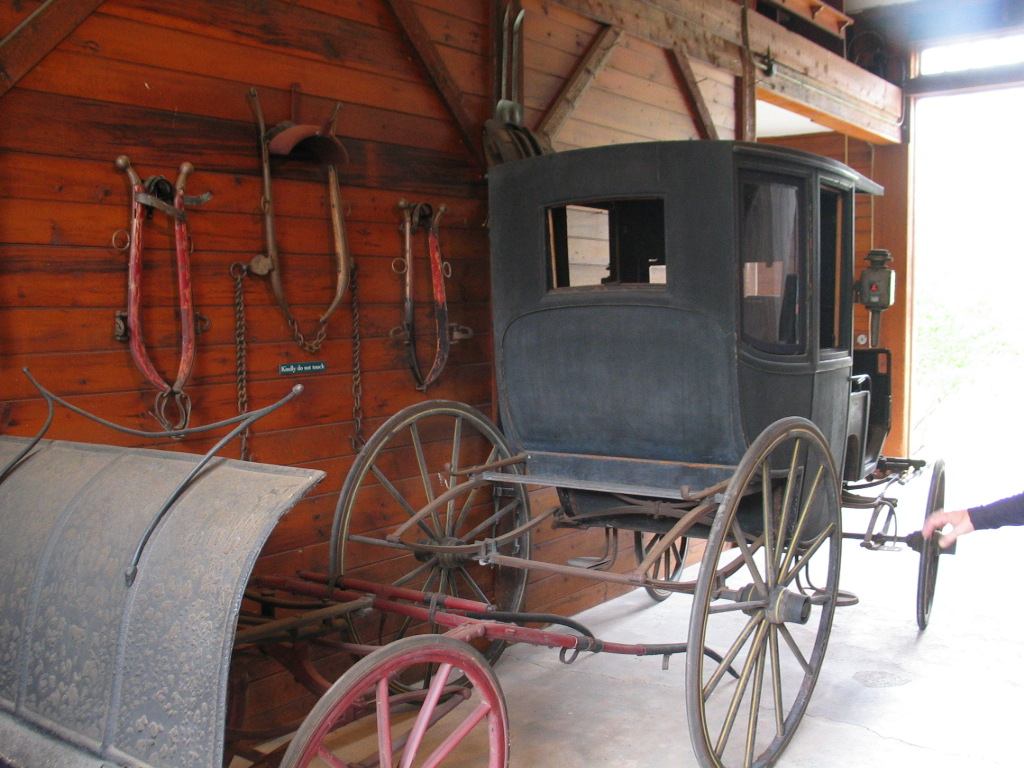
Breezway of Hill–Stead's Carriage House

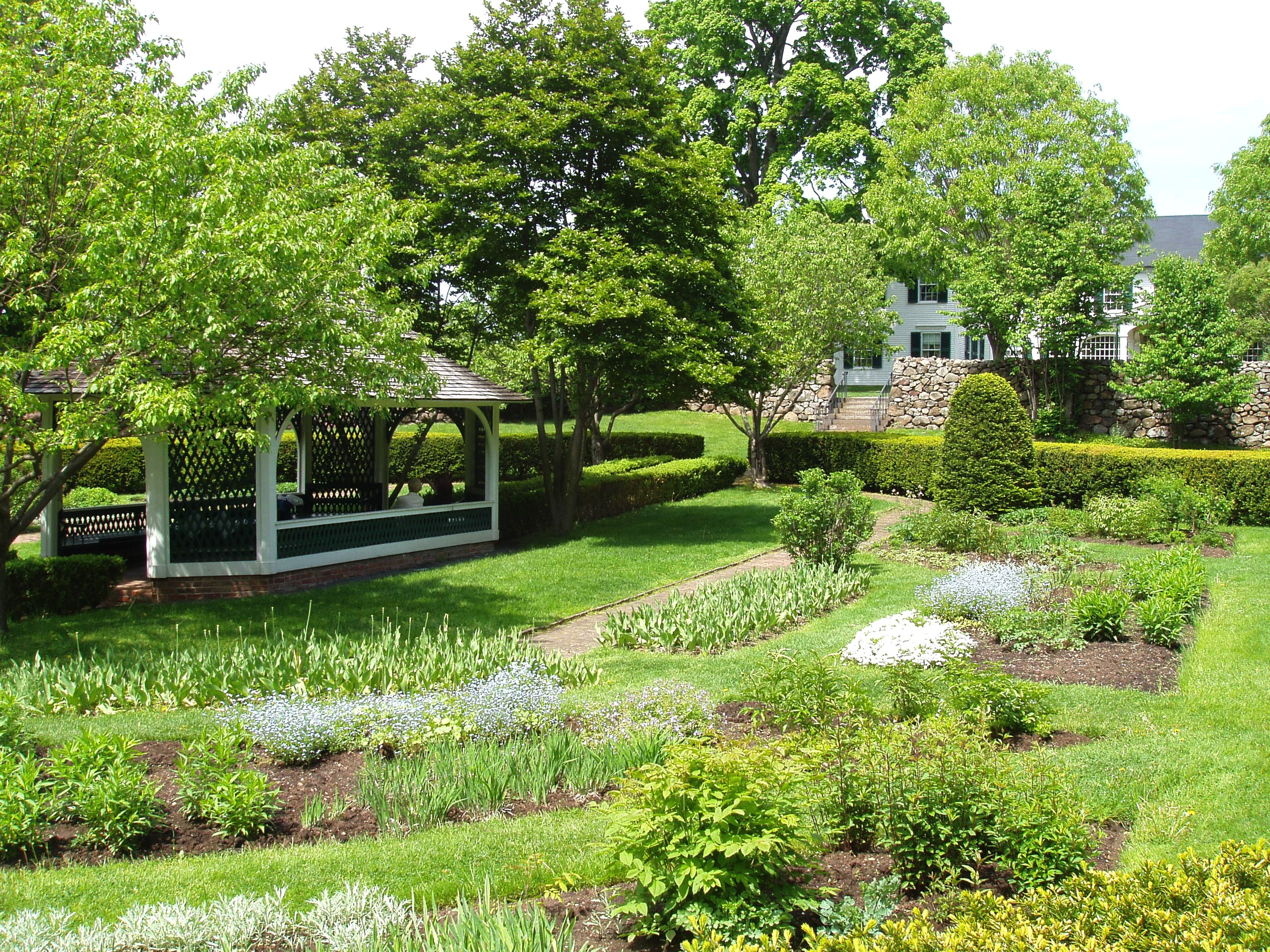
The Sunken Garden

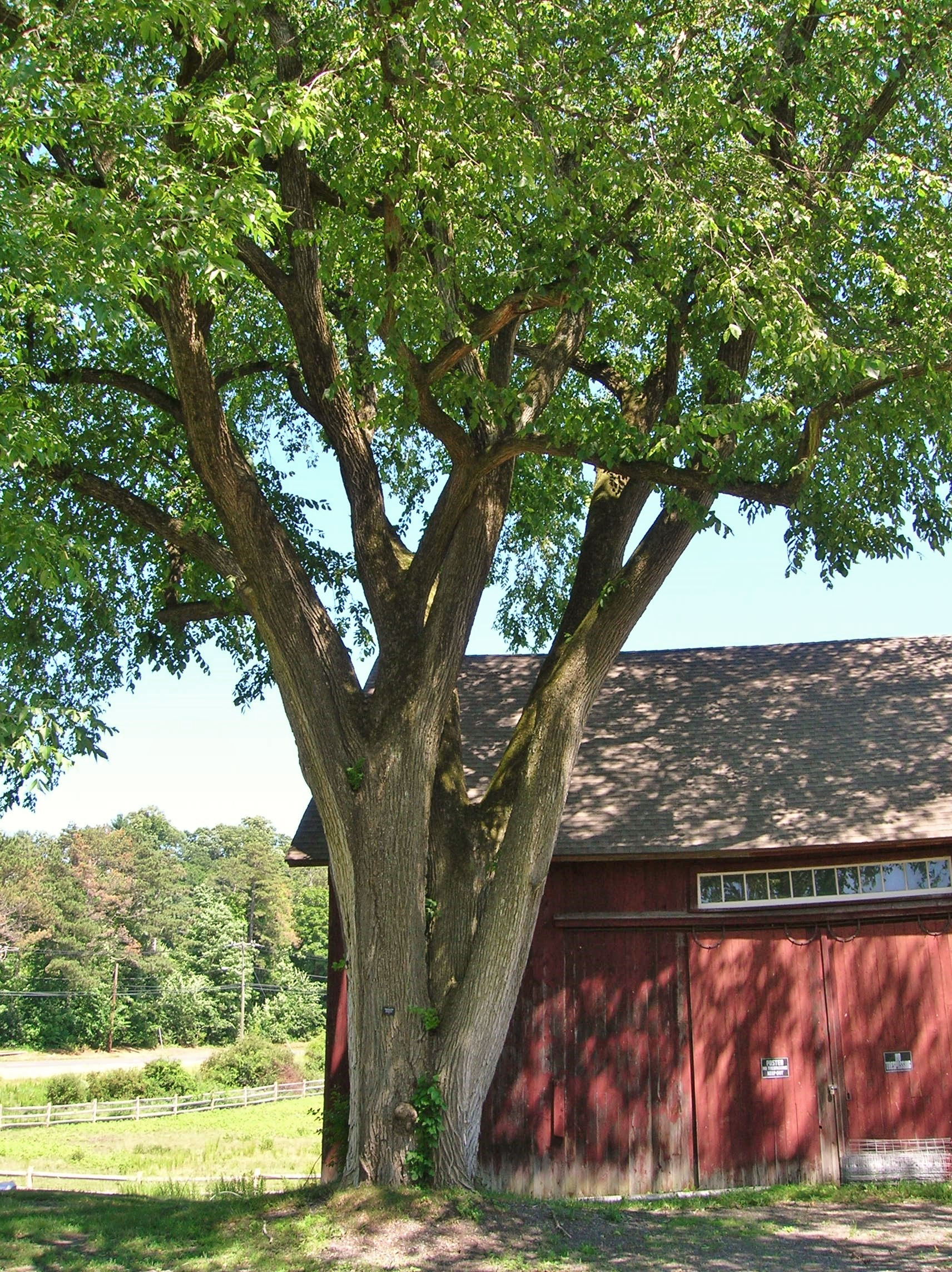
American Elm (summer)

== See also ==
- List of National Historic Landmarks in Connecticut
- National Register of Historic Places listings in Hartford County, Connecticut
