= Jennifer Oakes (poet) =

American poet and teacher

Jennifer Oakes (born 1969, formerly Jennifer Boyden) is an American poet, novelist, and teacher.

== Early life and education ==
Jennifer Oakes grew up in Stillwater, Minnesota. She attended Creighton University (B.A., Creative Writing), and Eastern Washington University (M.F.A., Creative Writing, With Distinction).

== Career ==
Oakes' poetry is described as lyrical and imagistic, and her themes often relate to environmental issues. Her first book, The Mouths of Grazing Things (published under the name Jennifer Boyden) was selected by Robert Pinsky to receive the Brittingham Prize in Poetry in 2010 (University of Wisconsin Press). Her later books include The Declarable Future (2018, published under the name Jennifer Boyden) and We Can’t Tell If the Constellations Love Us (2023, published under Jennifer Oakes).

Oakes’ novel, The Chief of Rally Tree (published under Jennifer Boyden), was selected by author Ann Pancake for the Siskiyou Prize for New Environmental Literature. Author Pancake commented in her selection notes, “Inventive, smart, and often hilariously funny, The Chief of Rally Tree delivers a social critique both searing and sly.”

In 1999, Oakes was awarded the PEN Northwest / Margery Davis Boyden Wilderness Writing residency and lived in an isolated, remote wilderness region near the Rogue River in southern Oregon. Her work was influenced by this wilderness immersion. A later environmental project was funded by a grant from Washington State Artist Trust Gap Grants. For this project, Oakes walked hundreds of miles and wrote essays that arose from the walks.

Oakes also collaborates with visual artists. Projects that feature her text include work with Buster Simpson and her ex-husband, visual artist Ian Boyden, as well as creative nonfiction responding to work by artists such as Pacific Northwest photographer Peter deLory.

Oakes lives in Seattle, WA, where she teaches at Eastside Preparatory School and is a contributing editor for Solstice Magazine. Formerly on the faculties of Walla Walla Community College and Whitman College (Walla Walla, Washington), Suzhou University (China), and at Eastern Oregon University in the low-residency MFA Program, her main teaching areas are creative writing, poetry, environmental literature, and experimental, cross-genre forms.

== Personal life ==
Oakes was married to visual artist Ian Boyden (m. 2001 div. 2023). Together, they have a daughter.

== Books ==
- We Can’t Tell If the Constellations Love Us (poetry, 2023, 42 Miles Press). Awarded the 42 Miles Press Poetry Award.
- The Chief of Rally Tree (fiction, 2018, Skyhorse Publishing). Awarded the Siskiyou Prize for New Environmental Literature.
- The Declarable Future (poetry, 2013, University of Wisconsin Press). Awarded the Four Lakes Prize in Poetry.
- The Mouths of Grazing Things (poetry, 2010, University of Wisconsin Press). Awarded the Brittingham Prize in Poetry

== Awards ==
- 42 Miles Press Poetry Award (2021) for the book of poetry We Can’t Tell If the Constellations Love Us
- Siskiyou Prize for New Environmental Literature (2015) for the novel The Chief of Rally Tree (published 2018) selected by Ann Pancake
- The Four Lakes Prize in Poetry (2013) for the book of poetry The Declarable Future
- The Brittingham Prize in poetry, 2010, selected by Robert Pinsky (University of Wisconsin Press)
- PEN Northwest Wilderness Writing Residency.
- Washington State Artist Trust Gap Grant.
- Distinguished Alumni Award
- Eastern Washington University, Inland Northwest Center for Writers, 2010
- Blue Mountain Arts Alliance grant awarded for Convergences, a public art sculpture installed in downtown Walla Walla, Washington, 2004.
