= List of Miss Porter's School alumnae =

The following is a list of notable Ancients (alumnae) from Miss Porter's School in Farmington, Connecticut.

== 1850s ==
- Eliza Talcott – attended in the 1850s; founder of Kobe College

== 1870s ==
- Grace Hoadley Dodge (1873) – established Columbia University Teachers' College
- Nellie Grant (1873) – daughter of U.S. President Ulysses S. Grant and First Lady Julia Grant
- Mary Knight Wood (1875) – pianist, music educator and composer
- Julia Lathrop (1876) – first woman to head a government agency in the United States

== 1880s ==
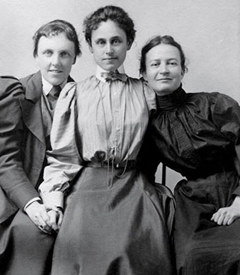
Theodate Pope, Alice Hamilton, and a student believed to be Agnes Hamilton, 1888. Courtesy of Miss Porter's School.

- Helen Gilman Noyes Brown (1881) – philanthropist
- Edith Hamilton (1886) – Greek mythology scholar; sister of Alice Hamilton
- Alice Hamilton (1888) – first female faculty member of the Harvard Medical School; founder of the field of industrial medicine
- Theodate Pope Riddle (1888) – architect and philanthropist; architect and founder of Avon Old Farms School; architect of Westover School

== 1890s ==
- Madeline McDowell Breckinridge (1890) – a leader of the women's suffrage movement, a leading Progressive reformer, and great-granddaughter of Henry Clay
- Ruth Hanna McCormick (1897) – member of the U.S. House of Representatives from Illinois and the first woman to run for the U.S. Senate
- Princess Anastasia of Greece and Denmark (née Nonie May Stewart) – American-born wife of Prince Christopher of Greece and Denmark, the son of King George I of Greece

== 1910s ==
- Edith Roelker Curtis (1912) – author, historian, and diarist
- Dorothy Keeley Aldis (1914) – children's author and poet
- Emily Hale (1916) – speech and drama teacher, and muse of T.S. Eliot

== 1930s ==
- Barbara Hutton (1930) – socialite, dubbed "Poor Little Rich Girl"
- Gloria Vanderbilt – artist, writer, actress, fashion designer, heiress, and socialite
- Edith Bouvier Beale (1935) – socialite; cousin of Jacqueline Kennedy Onassis; subject of the documentary film Grey Gardens
- Anne Cox Chambers (1938) – U.S. Ambassador to Belgium during the Carter administration
- Gene Tierney (1938) – Academy Award-nominated actress
- Brenda Frazier (1939) – socialite

== 1940s ==
- Polly Allen Mellen (1942) – editor of Vogue magazine
- Dina Merrill (née Nedenia Hutton) (1943) – actress and American socialite
- Letitia Baldrige Hollensteiner (1943) – author and social secretary to Jacqueline Bouvier Kennedy
- Jacqueline Bouvier Kennedy Onassis (1947) – former First Lady of the United States
- Patience Cleveland (1948) – actress and published author
- Lilly Pulitzer (née Lillian Lee McKim) (1949) – fashion designer and American socialite

== 1950s ==
- Lee Radziwill (née Bouvier) (1950) – public relations executive for Giorgio Armani, author, and younger sister of Jacqueline Bouvier Kennedy Onassis
- Elizabeth Cushman Titus Putnam (1951) – founding president of the Student Conservation Association (SCA) and recipient of the Presidential Citizens Medal
- Laura Rockefeller Chasin (1954) – socialite
- Elise Ravenel Wood du Pont (1954) – former First Lady of Delaware and 1984 Republican candidate for the U.S. House of Representatives
- Barbara Babcock (1955) – Emmy Award-winning actress for Hill Street Blues
- Pema Chödrön (formerly Deirdre Blomfield-Brown) (1955) – Buddhist nun and author; resident director of Gampo Abbey
- Agnes Gund (1956) – president emerita of the Museum of Modern Art and 1997 recipient of the National Medal of Arts

== 1960s ==
- Mimi Alford (1961) – former White House intern who wrote a book about her affair with John F. Kennedy
- Sheila Ford Hamp (1969) – owner of the Detroit Lions

== 1970s ==
- Elizabeth May (1972) – the first elected Green Party Member of Parliament in Canada and leader of the Green Party of Canada
- Dorothy Bush Koch (1977) – philanthropist and member of the Bush political family
- Sarah Ludlow Blake (1978) – writer

== 1980s ==
- Susannah Grant (1980) – director and Academy Award-nominated screenwriter for Erin Brockovich
- Gregg Renfrew (1986) – entrepreneur and founder of Beautycounter
- Mary Anne Amirthi Mohanraj (1989) – writer and editor

== 1990s ==
- Chrishaunda Lee (1994) – niece of Oprah Winfrey and hostess of PBS programming

== 2000s ==
- Mamie Gummer (2001) – actress; daughter of actress Meryl Streep
- Hayley Petit (2007) – victim of the Cheshire murders

== Fictional alumnae ==
- In the 2003 drama Mona Lisa Smile, Joan Brandwyn's student file reveals that she attended Miss Porter's School, though the film incorrectly locates it in Pennsylvania.
- In the 2000 drama The Skulls, Chloe is stated to have attended Miss Porter's School.
- In the series Gossip Girl, a guest character by the name of Shelby Wright goes to Miss Porter's.
- In the series Mad Men, Sally Draper attended Miss Porter's.
