= Farmington, Connecticut =

Town in Connecticut, United States

- Town
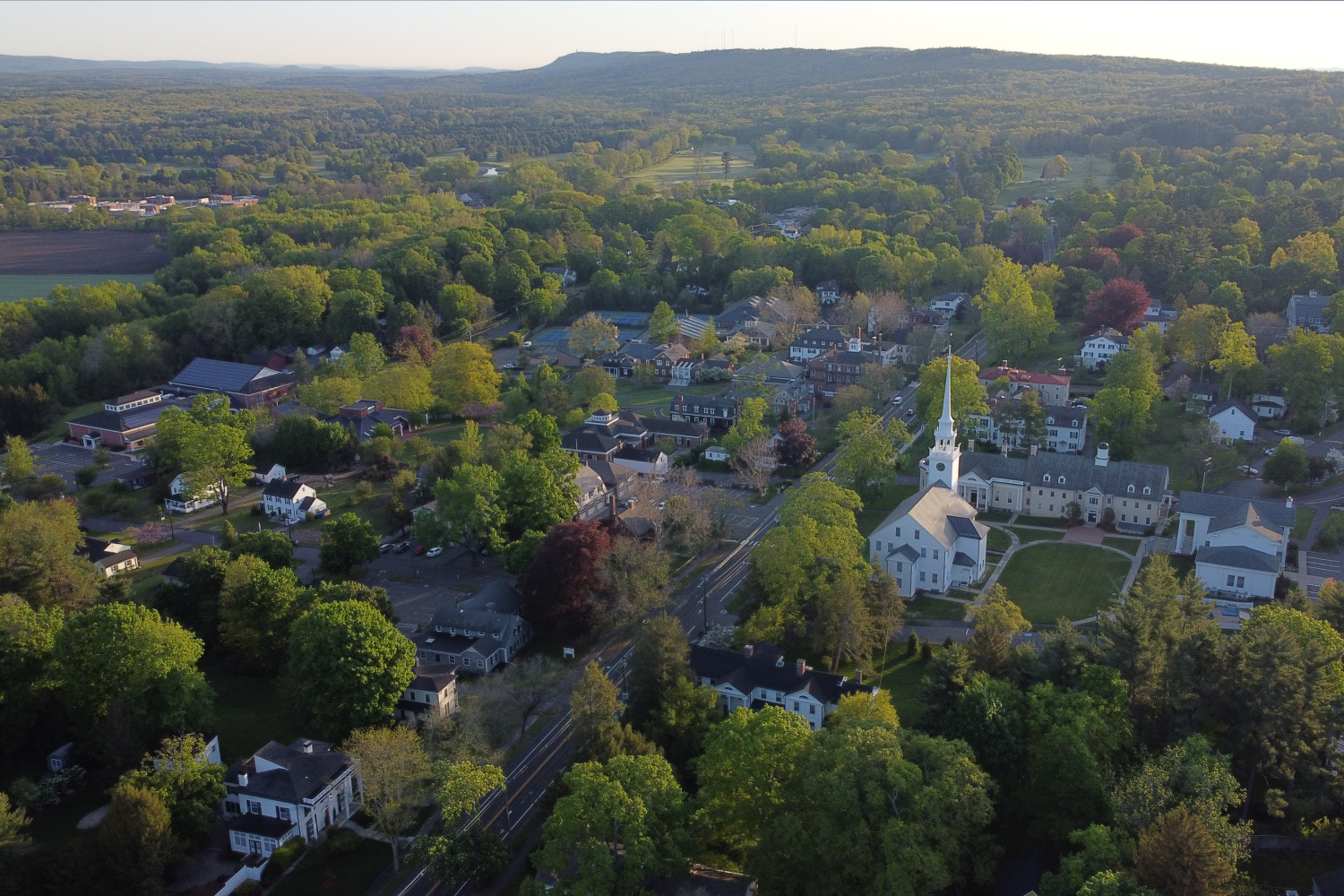
- Aerial view of the Farmington Historic District

- Seal
- Motto(s): "Respecting History, Planning The Future"
- Interactive map of Farmington, Connecticut
- Coordinates: 41°43′40″N 72°50′25″W
- Country: United States
- U.S. state: Connecticut
- County: Hartford
- Region: Capitol Region
- Settled: June 1640
- Incorporated: December 1645
- Consolidated: 1947
- Communities: Farmington; Bensted Corner; East Farmington Heights; Farmington Station; Oakland Gardens; River Glen; Unionville

Government
  - Type: Council-manager
  - Town Council: C.J. Thomas (R), Chm; Rafeena Bacchus Lee (D); Joseph Capidoferro (R); Edward Giannaros (D); Johnny Carrier (R); Brian Connolly (D); Keith Vibert (R)

Area
  - Total: 28.8 sq mi (74.5 km^{2})
  - Land: 28.0 sq mi (72.6 km^{2})
  - Water: 0.77 sq mi (2.0 km^{2})
- Elevation: 161 ft (49 m)

Population (2020)
  - Total: 26,712
  - Density: 953/sq mi (368/km^{2})
- Time zone: UTC−5 (Eastern)
  - Summer (DST): UTC−4 (Eastern)
- ZIP Codes: 06032, 06085
- Area codes: 860/959
- FIPS code: 09-27600
- GNIS feature ID: 0213430
- Website: www.farmington-ct.org

Farmington is a town in Hartford County in the Farmington Valley area of central Connecticut in the United States. The town is part of the Capitol Planning Region. The population was 26,712 at the 2020 census. It sits 10 miles west of Hartford at the hub of major I-84 interchanges, 25 miles south of Bradley International Airport and two hours by car from New York City and Boston. It has been home to the world headquarters of several large corporations including Otis Elevator Company, United Technologies, and Carvel. The northwestern section of Farmington is a suburban neighborhood called Unionville.

== History ==
=== Eighteenth and nineteenth centuries ===
Town	Date of separation
Harwinton (portion)	1737
Southington	1779
Berlin	1785
Bristol	1785
Wolcott (eastern part)	1796
Burlington (from Bristol)	1806
Avon	1830
Bloomfield	1835
New Britain (from Berlin)	1850
Plainville	1869

Farmington was originally inhabited by the Tunxis Indian tribe. In 1640, a community of English immigrants was established by residents of Hartford, making Farmington the oldest inland settlement west of the Connecticut River and the twelfth oldest community in the state. Settlers found the area ideal because of its rich soil, location along the floodplain of the Farmington River, and valley geography.

The town and river were given their present names in 1645, which is considered the incorporation year of the town. The town's boundaries were later enlarged several times, making it the largest in the Connecticut Colony. The town was named "Farmington" on account of its location within a farming district.

Farmington has been called the "mother of towns" because its vast area was divided to produce nine other central Connecticut communities. The borough of Unionville, in Farmington's northwestern corner, was once home to many factories harnessing the water power of the Farmington River.

Farmington is steeped in New England history. Main Street, in the historic village section, is lined with colonial estates, some of which date back to the 17th century. On May 19, 1774, in response to the adoption of the Boston Port Act, the people of Farmington assembled, held a mock trial for the bill, found the bill guilty of "being instigated by the devil," and subsequently had a copy of the bill hung and then set on fire. During the Revolutionary War, George Washington passed through Farmington on several occasions and referred to the town as "the village of pretty houses." In addition, French troops under General Rochambeau encamped in Farmington en route to Westchester County to offer crucial support to General Washington's army.

=== Nineteenth century ===
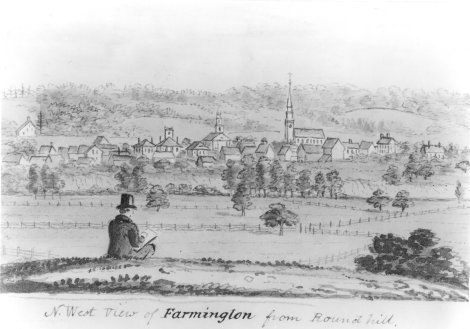
Northwest View of Farmington from Round Hill, by John Warner Barber, 1836

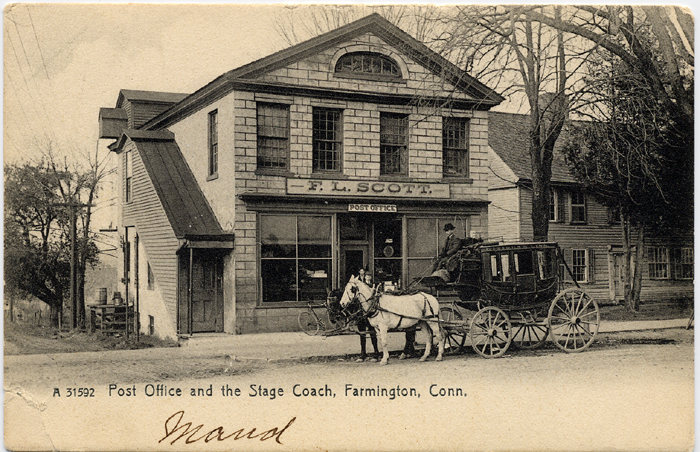
Post office and stage coach, 1907 postcard

The majority of Farmington residents were abolitionists and were active in aiding escaped slaves. Several homes in the town were "safe houses" on the Underground Railroad. The town became known as "Grand Central Station" among escaped slaves and their "guides".

Farmington played an important role in the famous Amistad trial. In 1841, 38 Mende Africans and Cinqué, the leader of the revolt on the Amistad slave ship, were housed and educated in Farmington after the U.S. government refused to provide for their return to Africa following the trial. The Mende were educated in English and Christianity while funds were raised by residents for their return to Africa.

The Farmington Canal, connecting New Haven with Northampton, Massachusetts, passed through the Farmington River on its eastern bank and was in operation between 1828 and 1848. The canal's right of way and towpath were eventually used for a railroad, portions of which were active up to the 1990s. Part of the canal and railroad line has now been converted to multi-use paved trails, called the Farmington Canal Heritage Trail and the Farmington River Trail, respectively.

== Geography ==
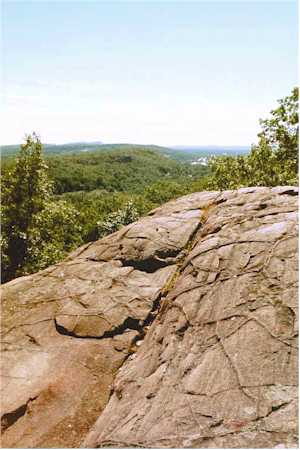
Rattlesnake Mountain

According to the United States Census Bureau, the town has a total area of 28.8 square miles (74.5 km^{2}), of which 28.0 square miles (72.6 km^{2}) is land and 0.77 square miles (2.0 km^{2}), or 2.65%, is water.

After its founding, Farmington gave up territory to form Southington (1779), Bristol (1785), Avon (1830), Plainville (1869), and parts of Berlin (1785) and Bloomfield (1835). Farmington presently borders the towns of Avon, Burlington, Newington, West Hartford, and Plainville, and the cities of New Britain and Bristol.

Farmington is mostly wooded, but there are also meadows and hills in the east and southeast. There are also numerous ponds and lakes. The Farmington River runs through the town from the northwest from Burlington, enters Unionville, then takes a sharp turn near Farmington Center and flows north towards Avon. The Metacomet Ridge, a 100-mile (160 km) range of low traprock mountain ridges, occupies the east side of Farmington as Pinnacle Rock, Rattlesnake Mountain, Farmington Mountain, and Talcott Mountain.

== Demographics ==
Historical population
Year	Pop.	±%
1756	3,707	—
1774	6,069	+63.7%
1782	5,542	−8.7%
1790	2,696	−51.4%
1800	2,809	+4.2%
1810	2,748	−2.2%
1820	3,042	+10.7%
1830	1,901	−37.5%
1840	2,041	+7.4%
1850	2,630	+28.9%
1860	3,144	+19.5%
1870	2,616	−16.8%
1880	3,017	+15.3%
1890	3,179	+5.4%
1900	3,331	+4.8%
1910	3,478	+4.4%
1920	3,844	+10.5%
1930	4,548	+18.3%
1940	5,313	+16.8%
1950	7,026	+32.2%
1960	10,813	+53.9%
1970	14,390	+33.1%
1980	16,407	+14.0%
1990	20,608	+25.6%
2000	23,641	+14.7%
2010	25,340	+7.2%
2020	26,712	+5.4%
Source: Interactive Connecticut State Register & Manual and U.S. Census Bureau, Population Division

As of the census of 2010, there were 25,340 people, 9,496 households, and 6,333 families residing in the town. The population density was 879.9 inhabitants per square mile (339.7/km^{2}). There were 11,072 housing units at an average density of 351.2 per square mile (135.6/km^{2}). The racial makeup of the town was 85.92% White, 9.59% Asian, 2.98% Hispanic or Latino of any race, 2.43% from two or more races, 2.21% African American, 0.49% from other races, and 0.04% Native American.

There were 10,522 households, out of which 29.6% had children under the age of 18 living with them, 53.7% were married couples living together, 8.0% had a female householder with no husband present, and 35.7% were non-families. Of all households, 29.6% were made up of individuals. The average household size was 2.38 and the average family size was 3.00.

In the town, the population was spread out, with 22.0% under the age of 18, 4.7% from 18 to 24, 29.7% from 25 to 44, 25.7% from 45 to 64, and 15.5% who were 65 years of age or older. The median age was 40 years. For every 100 females, there were 90.0 males. For every 100 females age 18 and over, there were 85.3 males.

In 2018, the median household income was $94,606 and the per capita income for the town was $56,571. About 3.1% of families and 5.8% of the population were below the poverty line, including 3.9% of those under age 18 and 6.3% of those age 65 or over.

== Government and politics ==
Farmington town vote by party in presidential elections
Year	Democratic	Republican	Third Parties
2020	59.95% 9,616	38.41% 6,160	1.64% 261
2016	53.37% 7,634	41.79% 5,977	4.84% 692
2012	50.89% 7,013	47.97% 6,611	1.15% 158
2008	57.48% 8,088	41.38% 5,822	1.14% 161
2004	52.62% 7,209	45.97% 6,298	1.41% 193
2000	51.49% 6,374	43.97% 5,443	4.55% 563
1996	47.48% 5,415	41.56% 4,739	10.96% 1,250
1992	39.74% 4,917	39.54% 4,893	20.72% 2,564
1988	45.12% 4,847	54.02% 5,803	0.86% 92
1984	37.25% 3,542	62.37% 5,931	0.38% 36
1980	34.91% 3,173	47.47% 4,314	17.62% 1,601
1976	41.63% 3,536	58.01% 4,927	0.35% 30
1972	39.56% 3,087	59.54% 4,646	0.90% 70
1968	44.80% 2,942	50.75% 3,333	4.45% 292
1964	63.04% 3,568	36.96% 2,092	0.00% 0
1960	45.44% 2,545	54.56% 3,056	0.00% 0
1956	30.71% 1,434	69.29% 3,236	0.00% 0

Voter Registration and Party Enrollment as of February 22, 2023
Party	Active Voters	Percentage
Democratic	6,684	33.10%
Republican	4,513	22.35%
Unaffiliated	8,693	43.05%
Minor parties	301	1.49%
Total	20,191	100%

== Economy ==
Top employers in Farmington according to the town's 2024 Comprehensive Annual Financial Report

#	Employer	# of Employees
1	UConn Health	7,664
2	Otis Worldwide	4,077
3	Companions & Homemakers	3,000
4	Trumpf	1,700
5	Town of Farmington/Board of Education	830
6	ConnectiCare	750
7	Tunxis Community College	500
8	American Red Cross	428
9	Connecticut Spring and Stamp	375
10	Jackson Laboratory	370

United Technologies was headquartered on Farm Springs Road along with its subsidiary Otis Worldwide. In 2019 it was announced that United Technologies would relocated its headquarters to Waltham, Massachusetts after the merger with Raytheon.

McKesson had a location in Farmington before departing in 2019.

Carvel, ConnectiCare, Farmington Displays, and Horizon Technology Finance, all maintain corporate headquarters in Farmington. Other prominent employers include the American Red Cross, Bank of America, Farmington Sports Arena, Stanley Black & Decker and TRUMPF Inc.

Farmington Bank was headquartered in town until it was acquired by People's United Bank in 2018.

The Jackson Laboratory of Bar Harbor, Maine, is building a new facility on the grounds of the University of Connecticut Health Center, which specializes in the research and development of genomic medicine. The project is part of BioScience Connecticut, an initiative designed to launch Connecticut into the forefront of biomedical research. A growing collection of doctor's offices and medical practices is concentrated in the vicinity of the University of Connecticut Health Center.

Farmington is unique in that more people work within the town lines than actually live there, a characteristic atypical of a traditional suburb.

== Arts and culture ==
=== Locations listed on the National Register of Historic Places ===
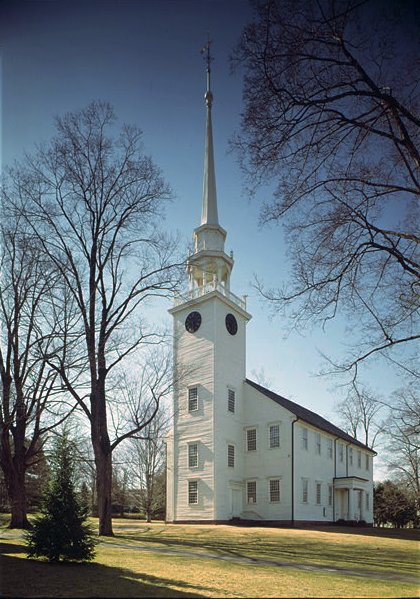
First Church of Christ. Photo by Jack Boucher.

- Austin F. Williams Carriagehouse and House – 127 Main Street (added 1998)
- Farmington Historic District – Porter and Mountain Roads, Main and Garden Streets, Hatter's and Hillstead Lanes, and Farmington Avenue (added 1972)
- First Church of Christ – 75 Main Street (added 1975)
- Gen. George Cowles House – 130 Main Street (added 1982)
- Gridley-Parsons-Staples Homestead – 1554 Farmington Avenue (added 1981)
- Hill-Stead Museum (added 1991). The estate, completed in 1901 and designed for Alfred Atmore Pope by his daughter Theodate Pope Riddle, one of the first woman American architects, is known for its Colonial Revival architecture. Now a museum, its 19 rooms hold a nationally recognized collection of Impressionist paintings by such masters as Manet, Monet, Whistler, Degas and Cassatt. It is the site of the annual Sunken Garden Poetry Festival and is a National Historic Landmark.
- Pequabuck Bridge – Meadow Road at Pequabuck River (added 1984)
- Shade Swamp Shelter – US 6 East of New Britain Avenue (added 1986)
- Stanley-Whitman House – 37 High Street (added November 15, 1966)
- West End Library – 15 School Street, Unionville (added 2000)

== Education ==
Farmington's seven public schools are highly regarded, ranking among the top in the state and nationally. The district's four pre-K to 4 elementary schools are Union School, West District School, Noah Wallace School, and East Farms School. West Woods Upper Elementary School houses grades 5 and 6. Irving A. Robbins Middle School houses grades 7 and 8. Farmington High School serves grades 9–12. In 2005, Farmington High School was ranked 125 on Newsweek magazine's list of the best schools in the United States, in 2006 it was ranked 269, and in 2007, 298.

Miss Porter's School, a private college preparatory school for girls, is located in Farmington's Historic District. The day and boarding school occupies much of the village center. Founded in 1843 by educational reformer Sarah Porter, the school has played a significant part in Farmington's history since its founding. As of the mid-2010s, the school owned over 90 buildings in Farmington center, approximately 70% of which were historic. Since then, Miss Porter's has been concentrating its footprint around its core buildings at the center of Main Street. Famous alumni include Jacqueline Kennedy Onassis, Princess Anastasia of Greece and Denmark, Lee Bouvier Radziwill, Lilly Pulitzer and members of the Bush, Vanderbilt, and Rockefeller families.

Tunxis Community College is in the southwest part of the town.

== Infrastructure ==
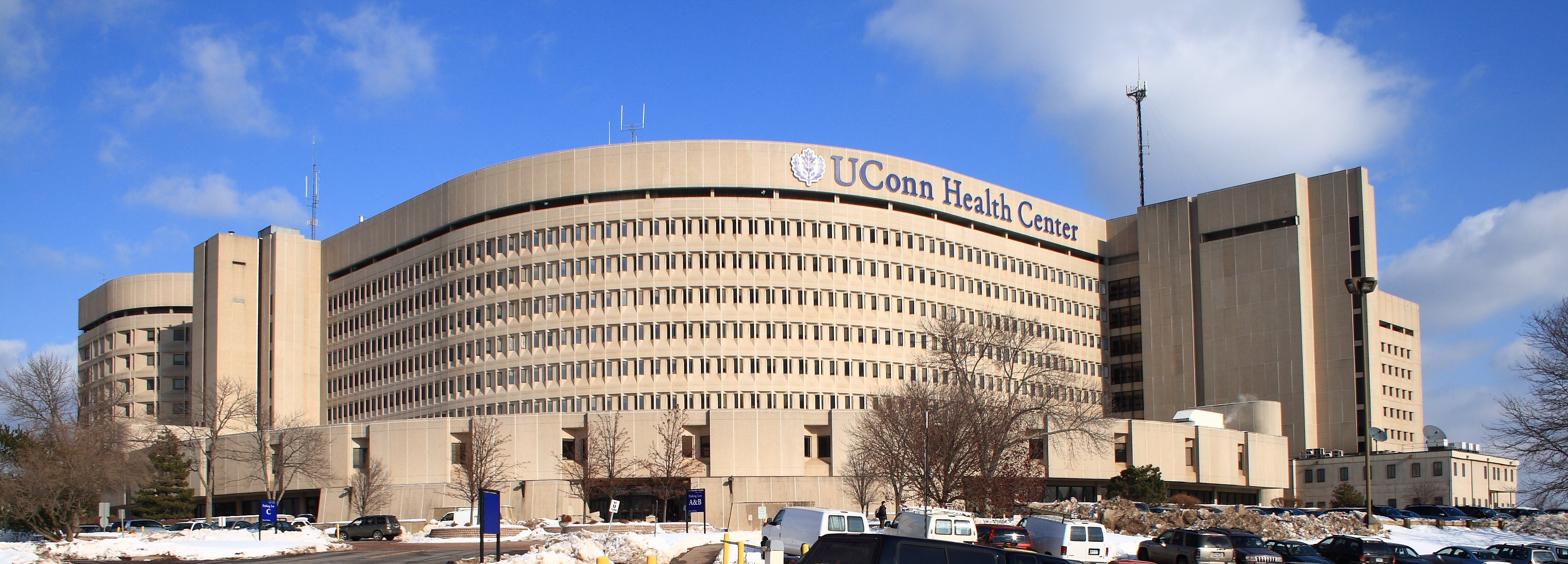
UConn Health Center

The University of Connecticut Health Center in Farmington employs approximately 4,600 full-time employees as of 2021. The Health Center also houses John Dempsey Hospital. The hospital provides the only full-service emergency department in the Farmington Valley and a Level III Neonatal Intensive Care Unit (NICU), one of only two in Connecticut.

=== Transportation ===
Connecticut Transit Hartford provides local bus service.

== Notable people ==
- Tim Abromaitis, professional basketball player
- Steve Addazio, college football coach
- Richard M. Bissell Jr., Central Intelligence Agency officer responsible for the U-2 spy plane project and the Bay of Pigs Invasion
- Nick Bonino, NHL hockey player
- Anna Roosevelt Cowles, eldest sister of President Theodore Roosevelt and aunt of Eleanor Roosevelt
- W. Sheffield Cowles, state representative and mayor of Farmington
- William S. Cowles, U.S. Navy rear admiral and state representative
- Tony Dokoupil, CBS News anchor, current host of the CBS Evening News
- Ron Francis, NHL hockey player, former Farmington resident
- Kevin Galvin, business and health care advocate
- Michael Gladis, actor, raised in Farmington and graduated from Farmington High School
- George Gleason, Wisconsin state assemblyman
- Joab Hoisington, one of the founders of Vermont, militia leader on the Patriot side in the American Revolution
- Orville Hungerford, U.S. congressman
- Curtis Jackson, hip hop rapper and entrepreneur, more commonly known as 50 Cent
- Tebucky Jones, former New England Patriots football player
- Chauncey Langdon, U.S. congressman from Vermont, born in Farmington
- Timothy Merrill, Secretary of State of Vermont
- Mary Jane Osborn, biochemist and microbiologist, died in Farmington in 2019 at the age of 91.
- Erin Pac, U.S. Olympic Women's bobsled team and two-woman bobsled event bronze medalist at the 2010 Winter Olympics
- Alfred Atmore Pope, industrialist and art collector, resided at Hill-Stead from 1901 to 1913; father of Theodate Pope Riddle
- Theodate Pope Riddle, noted architect and founder of Hill–Stead Museum
- Aric Rindfleisch, professor of business administration and department head at the College of Business at Illinois
- Kathleen Rubins, NASA astronaut and 60th woman in space; born in Farmington
- Amir Satvat, video game executive known for efforts helping jobseekers
- Pawel Szajda, actor, born and raised in Farmington, graduated from Farmington High School
- Kristen Taekman, model and cast member of The Real Housewives of New York City, born and raised in Farmington
- Asahel Thomson, state legislator
- Eli Todd, pioneer in the treatment of mental disorders
- John Treadwell, fourth governor of the state of Connecticut
- Mike Tyson, former resident. In 2004, 50 Cent bought Tyson's 18-acre (73,000 m^{2}) compound, which is located about 2 miles (3.2 km) southeast from the town center
- Suzy Whaley, the first female golfer to qualify for a PGA event; currently the president of the LPGA
- Wilford Woodruff, fourth president of the Church of Jesus Christ of Latter-day Saints (LDS Church), born in Farmington

== See also ==
- Hartford Connecticut Temple of the Church of Jesus Christ of Latter-day Saints
