= Gen. George Cowles House =

Historic house in Connecticut, United States

- U.S. National Register of Historic Places
- U.S. Historic district – Contributing property
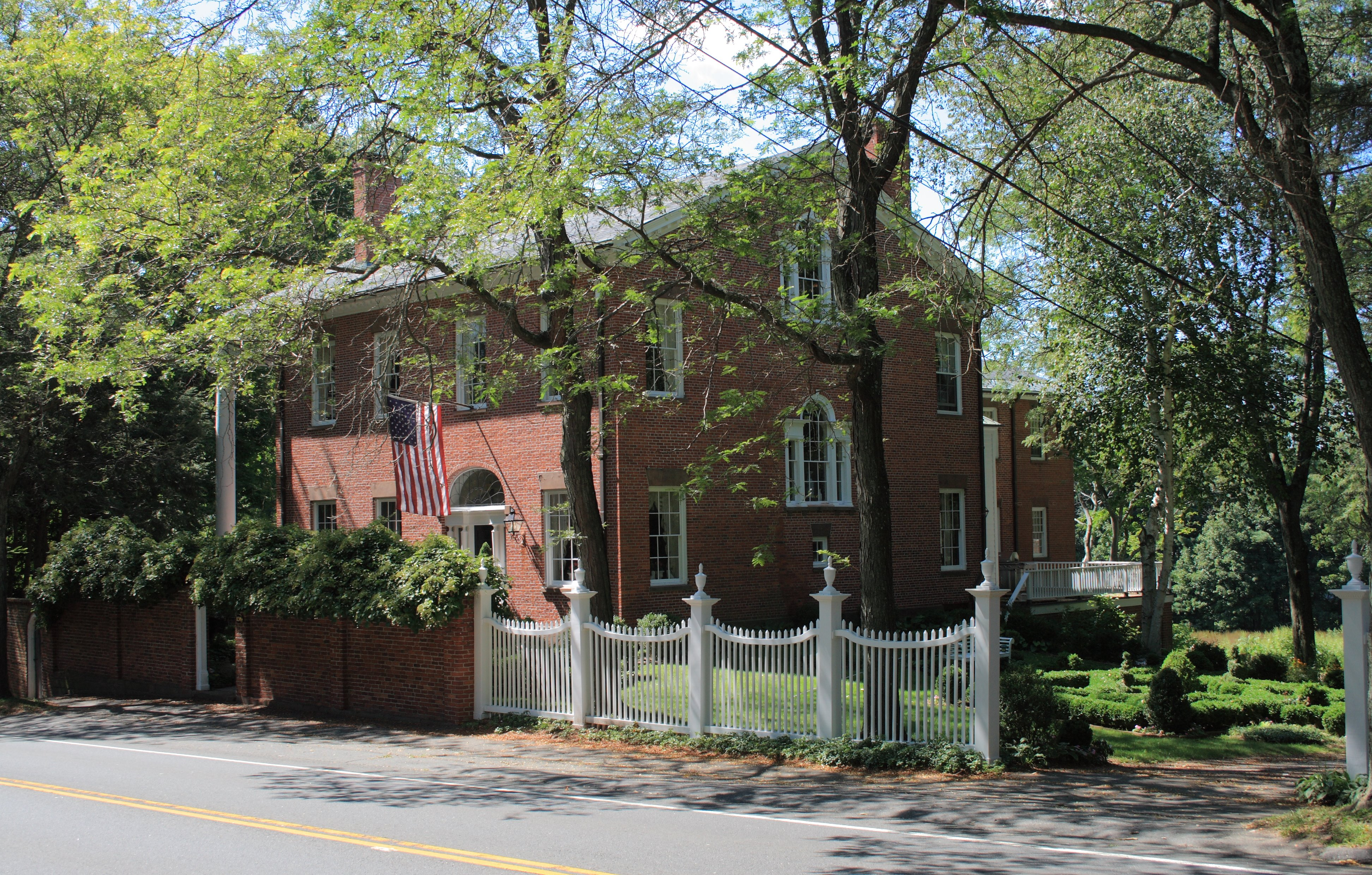

- Location within Connecticut Location within the United States
- Location: 130 Main Street, Farmington, Connecticut
- Coordinates: 41°43′3″N 72°50′9″W
- Area: 5.5 acres (2.2 ha)
- Built: 1803
- Architectural style: Early Republic, Jeffersonian Classicism
- Part of: Farmington Historic District (ID72001331)
- NRHP reference No.: 82004400

Significant dates
- Added to NRHP: May 11, 1982
- Designated CP: March 17, 1972

The Gen. George Cowles House, also known as the Solomon Cowles House, is a historic house at 130 Main Street in Farmington, Connecticut. Built in 1803, it is a prominent local example of Federal style architecture in brick, built for a prominent local family. The house was listed on the National Register of Historic Places on May 11, 1982.

== Description and history ==
The George Cowles House is located on the northwest side of Main Street (Connecticut Route 10) in geographically central Farmington, between Smith Drive and Pearl Street. It is a roughly square 2 1/2-story brick structure, four bays wide, with a side-gable roof and a rear two-story ell. The main entrance is slightly recessed in the load-bearing brick wall, and is flanked by sidelight windows and topped by a semi-elliptical transom window. The side elevation is notable for a pair of Palladian windows in the central bay, which are set higher than the flanking sash windows. The south elevation, facing the garden, has as particularly elaborate Jeffersonian portico.

The house was built 1803 for George Cowles, around the time of his marriage, by his father Solomon, a wealthy merchant. Both father and son were prominent in town affairs. The son did not have the business acumen of the father, and lost the house in foreclosure to a wealthy relative. Although a number of the building's owners subdivided its larger chambers to increase the number of bedrooms, these changes have generally been reversed.

== See also ==
- National Register of Historic Places listings in Hartford County, Connecticut
