= First Church of Christ, Congregational (Farmington, Connecticut) =

Historic church in Connecticut, United States

- U.S. National Register of Historic Places
- U.S. National Historic Landmark
- U.S. Historic district – Contributing property
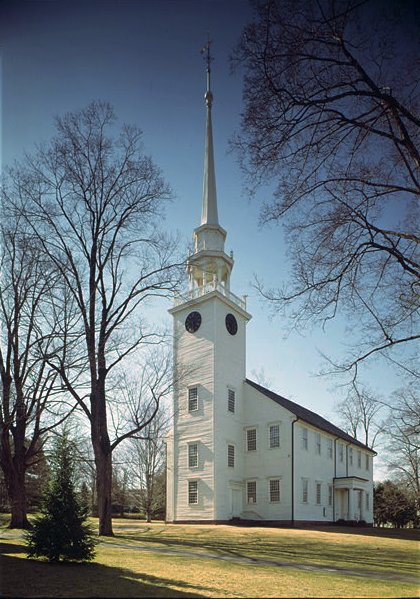

- Location within Connecticut Location within the United States
- Location: 75 Main Street, Farmington, Connecticut 06032
- Coordinates: 41°43′14.14″N 72°49′47.05″W
- Built: 1771
- Architect: Judah Woodruff
- Architectural style: Greek Revival
- Part of: Farmington Historic District (ID72001331)
- NRHP reference No.: 75002056

Significant dates
- Added to NRHP: May 15, 1975
- Designated NHL: May 15, 1975
- Designated CP: March 17, 1972

The First Church of Christ, Congregational, also known as First Church 1652 is an historic church at 75 Main Street in Farmington, Connecticut. Built in 1771, this classic meeting-house style church was designated a National Historic Landmark in 1975 for its role in sheltering the Amistad Africans before their return to Africa.

== Description and history ==
The First Church of Christ in Farmington was founded in 1652. Roger Newton, the first pastor, was the son-in-law of Hartford founder Thomas Hooker, and was succeeded by Hooker's son, Samuel. Among First Church's pastors was Noah Porter, who began America's first foreign missionary society in the parlor of his home. He was also the father of Sarah Porter, founder of Miss Porter's School, and Noah Porter, Jr., president of Yale University.

The present church, the third, originally known as the Meeting House, was built in 1771, designed by Judah Woodruff. The slender steeple on top of the bell tower can be seen for miles. The church is cited as an "excellent example of its architectural style and period".

The church began the first "Sabbath School" in the 1700s for the local Tunxis Indians, to teach them Christianity. It was a hub of the Underground Railroad, and became involved in the celebrated case of the African slaves who revolted on the Spanish vessel La Amistad. When the Africans who had participated in the revolt were released in 1841, they came to Farmington, and stayed with Austin Williams before their return to Africa. While staying in Farmington, they attended this church. The Amistad case was important for the abolitionist cause and significant in the history of slavery in the United States.

The church was declared a National Historic Landmark in 1975. It is included in the Farmington Historic District.

First Church is affiliated with the United Church of Christ.

== See also ==
- List of National Historic Landmarks in Connecticut
- National Register of Historic Places listings in Hartford County, Connecticut
- List of Underground Railroad sites
