= Stanley-Whitman House =

House-museum

- U.S. National Register of Historic Places
- U.S. National Historic Landmark
- U.S. Historic district – Contributing property
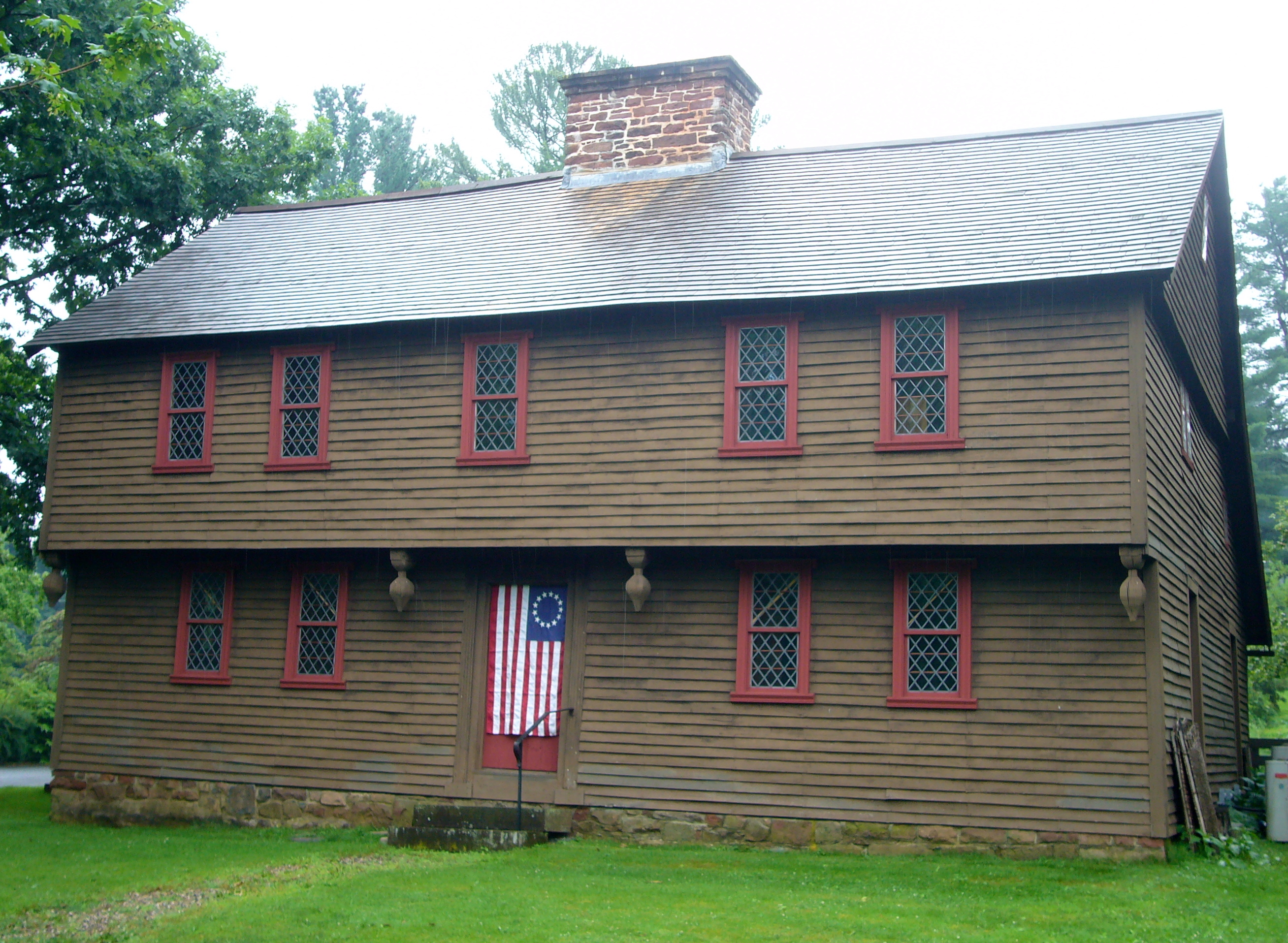
- Stanley-Whitman House

- Location within Connecticut Location within the United States
- Location: 37 High Street, Farmington, Connecticut
- Coordinates: 41°43′18.25″N 72°49′30.22″W
- Built: c.1720
- Architectural style: Colonial saltbox; framed overhang
- Part of: Farmington Historic District (ID72001331)
- NRHP reference No.: 66000882

Significant dates
- Added to NRHP: October 15, 1966
- Designated NHL: October 9, 1960
- Designated CP: March 17, 1972

The Stanley-Whitman House is a historic house museum at 37 High Street in Farmington, Connecticut. Built ca 1720, it is one of the oldest houses in Farmington. A well-preserved saltbox with post-medieval construction features, it was designated a National Historic Landmark in 1960 and National Register of Historic Places when the registry opened in 1966.

== Architecture ==
The Stanley-Whitman House is the fourth-oldest existent structure and the oldest eighteenth-century structure in modern-day Farmington. A centrally located chimney made of field and sandstone divides the house into two symmetrical halves. The original ca. 1720 house had four rooms and a third-story attic space. Family members lived, worked, and entertained in the parlor and kitchen on the ground floor and the parlor chamber and kitchen chamber on the second floor. When second owner Solomon Whitman added a lean-to onto the existing room-over-room 3-story building in the mid-eighteenth century, he expanded his family's living space and extended the roof line to create the classic saltbox silhouette for which Stanley-Whitman House is famous. The house has a framed overhang, in which the second story extends 18 inches (460 mm) over the first story. Four drop pendants, carved into the lower end of the posts, ornament the overhang; two of these are original while the other two are reproductions.

== History ==
Captain John Stanley (1624–1706) acquired the property where the Stanley-Whitman House would later stand sometime in the early eighteenth century. Stanley later bequeathed the property to his son Deacon John Stanley (1647–1729), then acting leader of Farmington's First Congregational Church. The younger John Stanley commissioned the construction of a "Dwelling house" on his new property between 1709 and 1719. It is likely that the younger John Stanley never inhabited the house, having soon thereafter sold the partially finished structure and six acres of land to Ebenezer Steele (1671–1722) in December 1720.

When Steele died several years later, daughter Mary Steele (1706–1789) inherited the house. In 1725, 18-year-old Mary and her 25-year-old husband Thomas Smith (1699–1788?) moved in, becoming its first occupants. In addition to farming a lot along the fertile banks of the Farmington River, Smith was also a professional weaver. His account book (currently in the collection of the Connecticut Historical Society Museum and Library) provides information about the types, patterns, and cost of the textiles he produced during his lifetime. While occupying the homestead, Thomas and Mary Smith had five of their eventual 12 children. In 1735, the Smiths sold the house to Reverend Samuel Whitman (1676–1751) for £160.

Reverend Whitman allowed his son Solomon (1710–1803) and new bride Susannah Cole Whitman (1715–1772) to reside in the homestead on Back Lane, as eighteenth-century High Street was then known, until officially transferring ownership of the house to his son in 1746. Solomon Whitman was a farmer and shoemaker. He also served as town clerk, justice of the peace, and probate judge in the village of Farmington. Whitman sat at the Hartford assembly and oversaw the town's first subscription library. In 1772, six months after his wife Susannah's death, Solomon relocated to Main Street, although his descendants continued to occupy the house until 1922.

Whitman descendant Henry Farnam, nephew of Yale University economics professor Henry Walcott Farnam (1853–1933), inherited the house in 1886. Working in tandem with his grandmother Ann Sophia Whitman (1816–1901), the younger Farnam commissioned architect Leoni W. Robinson (1851–?) to restore the 166-year-old house sometime between 1900 and 1910. Among other changes, Robinson likely added the concrete ell space to the mid-eighteenth-century lean-to. In 1922, Henry Farnam sold the house to town benefactor Danford Newton Barney III (1859–1936) for $1. Barney had previously funded the construction of a town library and maintenance of the historic town green; his next philanthropic project entailed converting Stanley-Whitman House into a museum. The official transformation of house to museum would be complete by 1935.

Before this stage, Barney's son Austin (1896–1971) and wife Katherine (1890–1978) moved into the house in 1924. The pair employed J. Frederick Kelly (1888–1947), a prominent architectural historian from New Haven, to supervise the restoration of the house in 1934. Kelly installed seventeenth-century style casement windows, replaced wall sheathing and floors, and even reversed the orientation of the first-floor staircase to return the house to its "original" colonial appearance. Kelly, along with everyone else, erroneously dated the house to 1660, a misconception that affected its restoration under Kelly's direction. This error was discovered and corrected in the 1980s.

== Museum ==
In September 1935, Austin Barney transferred his ownership of the Stanley-Whitman House to the Farmington Village Green and Library Association. FVGLA intended that the Farmington Museum, as the Stanley-Whitman House was then known, would be "used [as] a museum or [for] educational purposes." The Barney family later donated $35,000 to a fund supporting the museum. The Farmington Museum originally housed an array of Indian artifacts and colonial antiques mostly collected by former owner Katherine Barney.

In 1960 the Stanley-Whitman House was designated a National Historic Landmark. Over a twenty-year period beginning in the 1970s, museum administrators reevaluated the documentary history, mission, interpretation, and even the name of the historic house. A committee led by historian Abbott Lowell Cummings, with other historians and museum professionals, looked more closely at architectural elements of the house, uncovering evidence of both original structures and more recent alterations. Researchers revisited primary source material, both confirming and refuting previously held beliefs about the house and its occupants. A Yale University-led archaeological team examined the area surrounding the historic house, unearthing animal bones, pipe fragments, coins, and hundreds of other objects. The museum committee also discussed how to best interpret the 291-year-history of the Stanley-Whitman House. They decided to furnish the historic house to reflect two time periods: 1725 to 1735, when the Smiths occupied the house, and 1736–1772, when the first generation of Whitmans resided there.

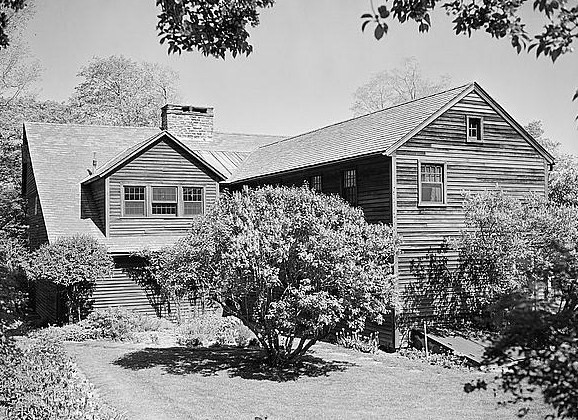
Stanley-Whitman House in 1967

The house is now marketed as a "living history center and museum that teaches through the collection, preservation, research, and dynamic interpretation of the history and culture of early Farmington. Programs, events, classes, and exhibits encourage visitors of all ages to immerse themselves in history by doing, acting, questioning, and engaging in Colonial life and the ideas that formed the foundation of that culture." Besides offering docent-led and self-guided tours of the historic house, visitors to the Stanley-Whitman House can participate in adult and children's programs, cooking demonstrations, walking tours, and other special events. Visitors can also view modern artist installations in the Speare Classroom, conduct genealogical or local history research in the Kenneth Johnson Research Library, walk around the grounds, and enjoy the seventeenth- and eighteenth-century reproduction flower, plant, and herb gardens.

== See also ==
- List of National Historic Landmarks in Connecticut
- National Register of Historic Places listings in Hartford County, Connecticut
