= United Financial Bancorp =

United Financial Bancorp, Inc.
- Type: Public company
- Traded as: Previously Nasdaq: UBCP
- Industry: Financial services, banking
- Founded: 1858
- Defunct: 2019
- Fate: Acquired and merged
- Successor: People's United Financial and then M&T Bank
- Headquarters: Hartford, Connecticut, United States
- Key people: William H.W. Crawford, IV. (was CEO & President)
- Net income: ($3.2) million (2019) or ($0.06) per diluted share
- Total assets: US $7.34 billion (2019)
- Number of employees: 810 (2019)
- Website: Official website

United Bank was an American bank headquartered in Hartford, Connecticut, and had locations throughout Connecticut, Massachusetts and Rhode Island. The bank was acquired in 2019 by People's United Financial and branches were rebranded or closed.

United Bank specialized in retail and business banking, commercial and consumer lending and wealth management services. The Bank provided services through its branches, online, mobile and telephone banking and by way of their relationship bankers.

It was a Connecticut state-chartered bank that in 2019 had $7.34 billion in assets, over 800 employees and 58 banking locations throughout Connecticut, Massachusetts and Rhode Island. United Financial Bancorp, Inc., the Bank's Holding Company, traded on the NASDAQ Global Select Stock Market under the ticker symbol “UBCP”.

Since its founding in 1858, United Bank had been a strong community partner with organizations throughout the areas it operated. In 2018, United Bank and its charitable foundations invested more than $1.2 million in hundreds of community partnerships, scholarships and corporate sponsorships.

== History ==
=== Timeline of significant events ===
1858: The Savings Bank of Rockville (now named United Bank after Rockville Bank merged with legacy United in 2014) was founded by twenty local businessmen in Rockville, Connecticut, declaring $175.00 in total assets.

1882: United Bank was founded as Springfield Cooperative Savings Fund and Loan Association, then becoming Springfield Cooperative Bank in 1883.

1960: After merging with Highland Cooperative Bank in 1960 and West Springfield Cooperative Bank in 1968, Springfield Cooperative Bank became United Cooperative Bank.

2000: Savings Bank of Rockville changed its name to Rockville Bank.

2004: United Cooperative Bank changed its name to United Bank, converted to a federal charter and formed a mutual holding company.

2005: Rockville Financial, Inc. the holding company for Rockville Bank, (now named United Financial Bancorp, Inc. after it acquired United Financial in 2014) became a public company and was no longer a non-stock or mutual holding company. United's mutual holding company initial public offering UBNK on NASDAQ.

2007: United Financial Bancorp, Inc. was incorporated as the holding company for United Bank and completed its second step conversion, becoming a fully public company.

2009: United Financial Bancorp, Inc. completed its acquisition of CNB Financial Corp., parent of Commonwealth National Bank.

2011: Rockville Financial, Inc. (“RCKB”) completed its second step conversion and became a fully public company. William H.W. Crawford, IV joined the Bank in January and officially became CEO in April.

2012: United Financial completed the acquisition of New England Bancshares, Inc., the holding company for New England Bank.

2013: Rockville Bank and United Bank announced plans for a merger of equals, a combined Bank to be led by William H.W. Crawford, IV, CEO.

2014: Rockville was the legal acquirer of United, completed the acquisition of United and immediately changed its name to United Financial Bancorp, Inc. Rockville Bank changed its name to United Bank at that time. As part of the merger, Richard B. Collins, President and CEO of legacy United Bank, retires after 12 years with the Bank.

2014: The “new” United Bank completed its core data processor conversion, officially becoming one United Bank with "community banking teams" covering key market areas throughout Connecticut and Massachusetts.

2015: The Rockville Bank Foundation changes its name to United Bank Foundation Connecticut. The United Bank Foundation changes its name to United Bank Foundation Massachusetts. Total charitable giving in 2015 was $1.2 million.

2015: For 2015, the company's return on average assets ("ROA") was 0.87%, and return on average equity ("ROE") was 8.08%.

2016: On October 18, the company announced record quarterly earnings for Q3 2016 and their 42nd consecutive quarterly dividend ($0.12 per share) to shareholders.

2017: On February 14, 2017, the company announced it would be relocating its Corporate Offices from Glastonbury, Connecticut to the Goodwin Square office tower in downtown Hartford, bringing over 200 jobs to Hartford's Central Business District.

2017: On March 31, 2017, the company announced record revenue and record pre-tax profit, growing its total assets to $6.7 billion.

2017: United Bank Foundation Connecticut and United Bank Foundation Massachusetts, along with the Bank, announced that together they invested over $1.2 million in various community partnerships throughout Connecticut and Massachusetts.

2017: On June 30, 2017, the company announced record earnings per share of $0.32 for Q2 2017 and its 45th consecutive dividend. As of June 30, the company's assets totaled $6.88 billion.

2017: United Financial Bancorp, Inc. was named by FORTUNE Magazine to their 100 Fastest Growing Companies List for 2017. United Financial ranked #39 out of 100.

2017: On September 30, 2017, the Company reported net income of $15.2 million, or $0.30 per diluted share for Q3 2017.

2017: In October 2017, United Bank officially moved its Corporate Offices from Glastonbury, Connecticut to the Goodwin Square Office Tower in Hartford, Connecticut. The Bank is now based in the Capitol City's central business district and has over 200 employees working in the downtown.

2018: On January 23, 2018, United Financial reported that net income for the year ended December 31, 2017 was $54.6 million, or $1.07 per diluted share, compared to net income of $49.7 million, or $0.99 per diluted share, for the year ended December 31, 2016.

2018: On March 1, 2018, United Bank announced plans to open a new banking office on Greenwich Avenue in Greenwich, Connecticut. Estimated to open in the fall of 2018.

2018: On May 22, 2018, United Bank and Webster Bank entered into an agreement where United would purchase six Webster branches located in Massachusetts, Connecticut and Rhode Island.

2018: On June 6, 2018, United Bank announced plans to open a second bank branch in Fairfield County at 374 Post Road East in Westport, Connecticut.

2018: Over Columbus Day Weekend - October 6 through October 8, 2018 - United Bank successfully completed the branch conversion related to the purchase of six Webster branches that was announced on May 22. As of October 9, 2018, United Bank has 56 bank branches throughout Connecticut, Massachusetts and Rhode Island.

2018: In December 2018, United Bank opened its first banking center on Greenwich Avenue in Greenwich, Connecticut. One month prior, United Bank opened another full service banking branch on Post Road East in Westport, Connecticut.

2019: In January 2019, United Bank and its two charitable foundations announced it dedicated more than $1.2 million to community partnerships, scholarships and corporate sponsorships during 2018.

2019: On July 15, 2019, People's United Bank (Bridgeport, Conn.) and United Bank announced they would be joining forces in an all-stock transaction totaling $759 million. People's United's acquisition of UBNK completed on November 1, 2019.

2022: People's United Bank is itself subsumed into M&T Bank.
