= Suzie Zuzek =

American textile designer (1920–2011)

Suzie Zuzek, c.1960

Suzie Zuzek (1920–2011) was an American artist and textile designer whose work was mainly seen in Lilly Pulitzer dresses, textiles and furnishings from the 1960s to the 1980s, and became exclusively associated with the brand until its closure in 1984. In the early 21st century, she was eventually acknowledged as the creator of some of the most widely recognized textiles of the 1960s and 1970s. A retrospective exhibition of her designs, curated in 2019 and shown in 2021 at the Cooper Hewitt, Smithsonian Design Museum, both recognized the impact of her work, and brought her out of obscurity.

== Early life ==
Zuzek was born Agnes Helen Zuzek in 1920, to Yugoslavian immigrant parents. She grew up outside Buffalo, New York, and during World War II served in the Women's Army Auxiliary Corps. Afterwards, she studied textile design at the Pratt Institute where she was top of her class, and after graduating in 1949, went on to work for a New York fabric company, Herman Blanc. She married John de Poo, who came from Key West.

== Career ==
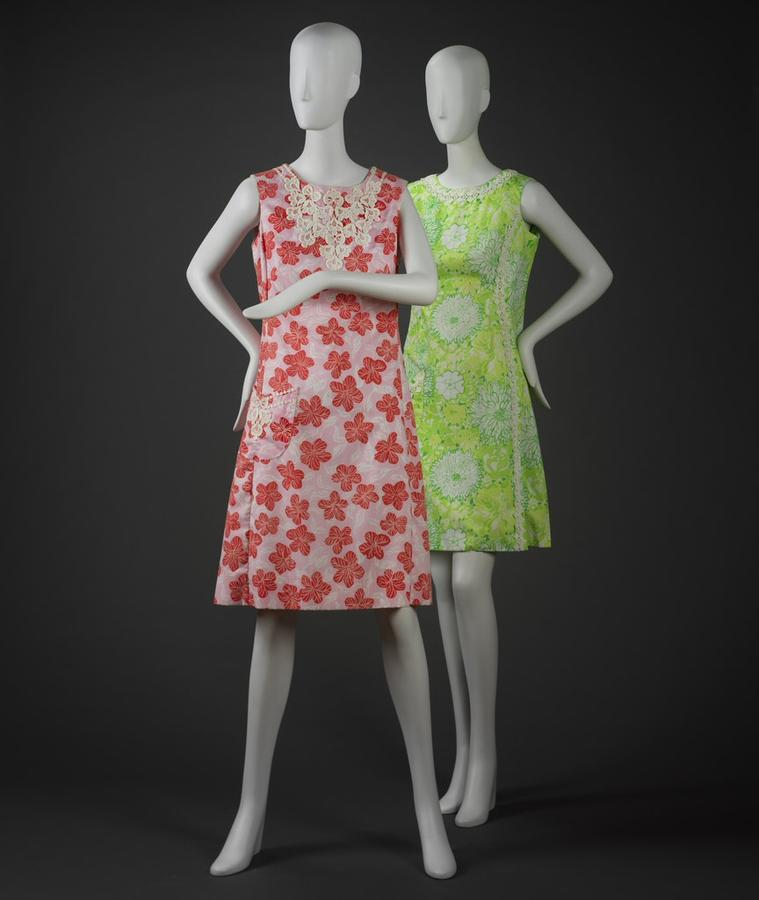
Lilly Pulitzer dresses in Zuzek prints, ca.1965 (RISD Museum)

After marriage, Zuzek left Herman Blanc and between 1954–1955 she and her husband moved to Key West in Florida, but then separated. This left her a single mother to three daughters. She eventually found work as a textile designer for Key West Hand Print Fabrics, a small screen-printing company founded in 1961 by a gay couple, Peter Pell and Jim Russell, who had formerly worked for Broadway theatre as set designers.

In 1962 Lilly Pulitzer traveled to Key West to locate the source of some material she had found elsewhere, reportedly demanding "Is this your shit?" and subsequently placed large orders for thousands of yards of fabric. A few years later, Key West Hand Prints were supplying Pulitzer with over five thousand yards of custom Zuzek-designed textiles a week. Pulitzer eventually bought out the company, as Zuzek's seemingly carefree artisanal textile designs were a key part of her label's image, and almost every Pulitzer garment was made up in a Zuzek print. Between 1962 and 1985, Zuzek produced over 1500 designs for the company. One of her first textiles for Pulitzer was worn by Jacqueline Kennedy at Hyannis Port, Massachusetts in 1962.

Flag of Key West, Florida

Despite their apparent effortless flow, Zuzek's designs were extremely complex, their motifs running in multiple directions over the surface of the textile and designed to ensure maximum coverage and minimal textile wastage when cutting out garments that used as much pattern as possible. While Zuzek favored a naturalistic color scheme, designing both bright flowers and softly hued animals in true-to-life hues, Pulitzer had them printed up in strong, vibrant colors. Although Pulitzer worked almost exclusively in Zuzek prints which made up 85 percent of her output, she and Zuzek did not collaborate specifically on the designs which were entirely Zuzek's own with no input from anyone else. Some of her designs included a 1972 print of green and purple cabbages called "Cole Slaw" and "The Reef", a 1979 underwater-themed fish and shells print. In addition to her work for Pulitzer, Zuzek designed a motif for the Key West flag, and her prints were used for boat sails and the uniforms for the Florida Tourist Board. One of her daughters, Martha de Poo, became head of the Key West Hand Prints art department.

In 1985 Zuzek retired from Key West Hand Prints.

== Later life and death ==
Zuzek remained in Key West, where she continued to paint, sculpt and create ceramic work. She died in 2011.

== Legacy ==
In 1984, following the filing for bankruptcy of Lilly Pulitzer, Zuzek's archive became lost, and was assumed to have been thrown away in the aftermath of the bankruptcy. In the 1990s when Lilly Pulitzer was revived, none of Zuzek's designs were brought along with it. The new owners of Lilly Pulitzer did not buy rights to the brand's heritage. In 2007, a St. Louis lawyer called Becky Smith, while seeking vintage Lilly Pulitzer upholstery fabric, met Martha de Poo, and was introduced to Zuzek. At this time, Smith had assumed that the prints were all designed by Lilly Pulitzer, which was how they had been originally marketed (to Zuzek's chagrin), and the discovery that they were almost entirely the work of Zuzek inspired her to raise awareness of the textile designer. Zuzek's archive was rediscovered under the floorboards of a warehouse, and Smith liaised with de Poo to help raise awareness and recognition of the Suzie Zuzek name and work. The archive, numbering over 2500 original drawings, was bought by Smith with the assistance of investors, and properly stored, catalogued and conserved. As of 2022, it is owned by a private company, The Original I.P. L.L.C.

In 2019 the Cooper Hewitt, Smithsonian Design Museum curated an exhibition dedicated to Zuzek's work, including her graphite and watercolor designs and drawings featuring floral motifs and a wide range of novelty themes such as animals, cosmology, and mythical creatures. Titled Suzie Zuzek for Lilly Pulitzer: The Prints That Made the Fashion Brand, the exhibit placed Zuzek's textiles in context as a key aspect of Pulitzer's success. The curator, Susan Brown, told W magazine that Zuzek's work was widely known and recognized, and had had a "major impact on the social history and the material culture of the 1960s and '70s", but that like many textile designers, her name had gone unheard and unknown, and this was a rare opportunity to give her due credit. The Museum also permanently acquired a group of ten Zuzek drawings. Suzie Zuzek for Lilly Pulitzer: The Artist Behind an Iconic American Fashion Brand, 1962-1985 by Susan Brown and Caroline Rennolds Milbank was published by Rizzoli Electa in 2020.

In addition to the Zuzek designs in the Cooper Hewitt Museum, other museums holding Zuzek's work with credit include the RISD Museum and the Victoria and Albert Museum. In 2023, Christie's auction house offered 43 of Zuzek's designs for sale.
