= J.Jill =

U.S. women's apparel retailer

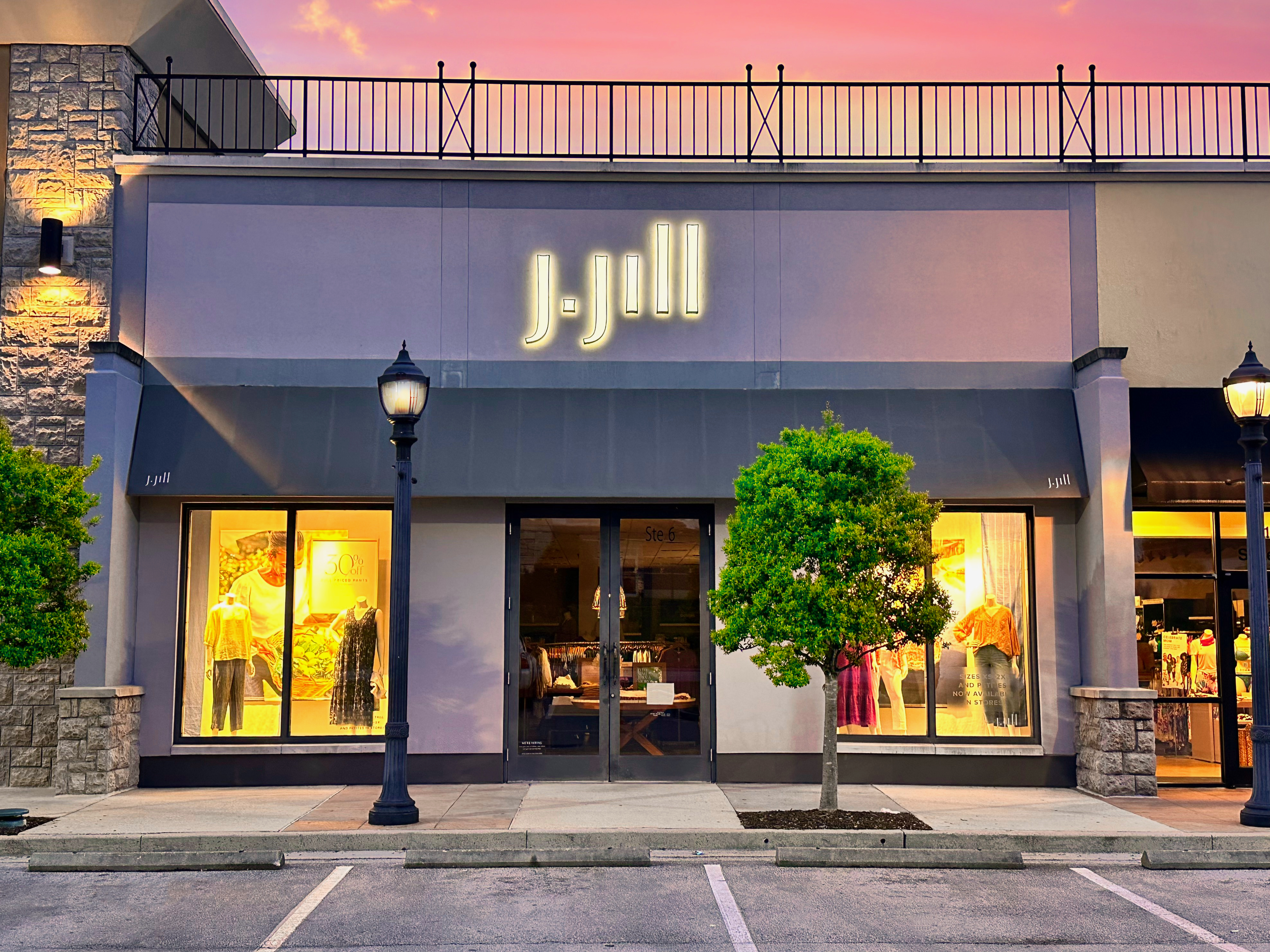
A J.Jill retail store at Hamilton Corner in Chattanooga, Tennessee

J.Jill is an American womenswear retailer founded in 1955 in Massachusetts. It has been a publicly traded company since 2017. J.Jill is headquartered in Quincy, Massachusetts.

== History ==
J.Jill was founded in the Berkshires, specifically in Great Barrington, Massachusetts, as a specialty store, by Karl Lipsky (1914–2009), in 1955, which he named for his wife, Jenifer, and daughter, Jill. Prior to J.Jill, Lipsky had previously founded Jenifer House, a catalog fashion retailer.

In 2006, J.Jill was acquired by rival retailer The Talbots, Inc., ceasing to be a publicly traded company; Talbots topped Liz Claiborne in a "bidding war" for ownership of J. Jill, paying US$517 million for the brand. Just three years later, Golden Gate Capital acquired the company for merely $63 million in 2009.

On March 9, 2017, J.Jill again became a publicly traded company on the New York Stock Exchange (NYSE), trading under the ticker symbol JILL. In June 2019, its shares took the biggest percentage decline since its 2017 IPO, plummeting 53.5%, which analysts blamed on design and color issues surrounding its inventory, and a premature move from its catalog model to a digital sales platform.

In May 2020, during the COVID-19 pandemic, J.Jill donated $50,000 to First Responders First, through its J.Jill Compassion Fund, and launched a campaign for National Nurses Month, offering a shopping voucher for its newest collection to nurses, first responders, and healthcare workers.

Mary Ellen Coyne is its CEO and president, effective May 1, 2025.

== See also ==
- J. Crew
- Lily Pulitzer
- Vineyard Vines
- Paul Stuart
- Brooks Brothers
- J. Press
- Arrow Shirts
