= Merrill Merchants Bank =

Bank in Maine, U.S.

- Company type: Public company
- Traded as: Holding company Nasdaq: MERB
- Industry: Financial services
- Founded: 1992
- Defunct: 2008
- Fate: Acquired
- Successor: People's United Financial
- Headquarters: Bangor, Maine, United States
- Area served: Maine
- Key people: William C. Bullock Jr (founder and president)
- Products: Banking services, savings, checking, consumer loans, mortgages, and credit cards

Merrill Merchants Bank was an American bank based in Bangor, Maine. The bank operated from 1992 until 2008, when was acquired by People's United Bank.

== History ==
The bank was founded in 1992 as a Maine-based institution which sought "to return local control to Bangor banking." It was established by buying seven former Fleet Bank offices in the area and had 75 employees, 7 branches, and $74 million in assets. William C. Bullock Jr. led the bank from its founding until his retirement in 2004. Leonard Minsky served as the bank's founding director.

In 2008, it was acquired by People's United Bank.
