= Gridley-Parsons-Staples Homestead =

Historic house in Connecticut, United States

- U.S. National Register of Historic Places
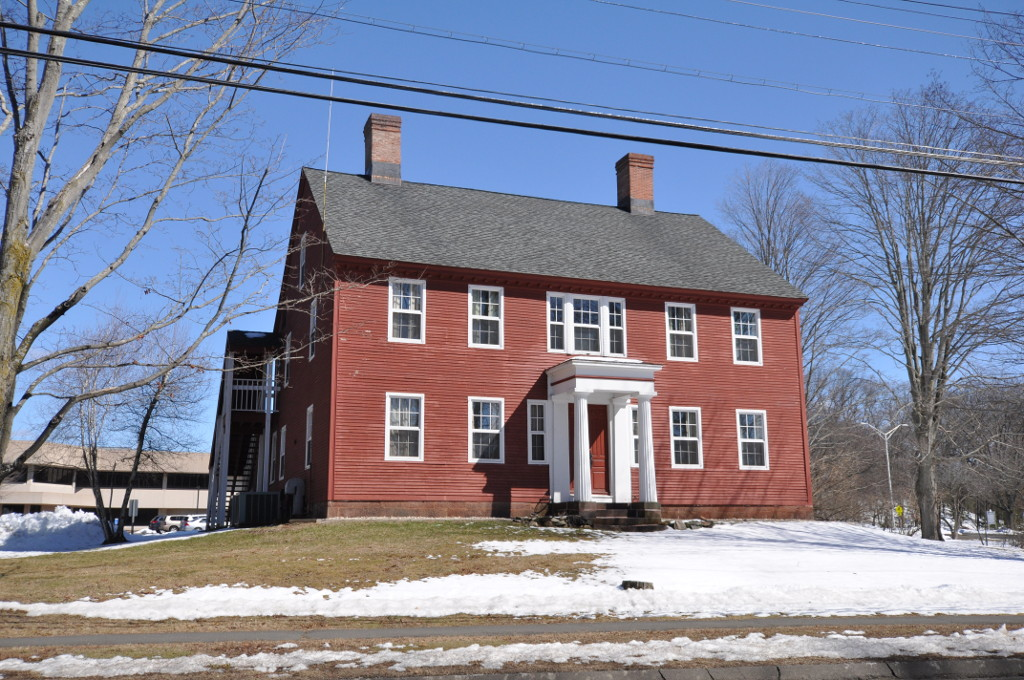

- Location within Connecticut Location within the United States
- Location: 1554 Farmington Avenue, Farmington, Connecticut
- Coordinates: 41°44′56″N 72°52′8″W
- Area: 3.5 acres (1.4 ha)
- Built: 1760
- Architectural style: Georgian; Colonial Revival
- NRHP reference No.: 81000537
- Added to NRHP: July 30, 1981

The Gridley-Parson-Staples House is a historic house museum at 1554 Farmington Avenue in Farmington, Connecticut. Probably built about 1760, it is the oldest surviving house in northwestern Farmington, and a fine example of 18th century Georgian architecture. It is now home to the Farmington Historical Society, and was listed on the National Register of Historic Places in 1981.

== Description and history ==
The Gridley-Parson-Staples House is located on the east side of Farmington Avenue (Connecticut Route 4) amid a cluster of municipal buildings, including the town hall, public library, and high school. It is a 2 1/2-story wood-frame structure, with a side-gable roof, two interior brick chimneys, and a clapboarded exterior. The main facade is five bays wide, with a center entrance sheltered by a Colonial Revival flat-roof portico supported by Doric columns. Above the entrance is a three-part Palladian style window with narrow side windows; the other windows on the facade are standard 6-over-6 sash. A 1 1/2-story ell, possibly of older construction, extends to the rear. The interior of the house follows a center-hall plan, with an unusually wide central hall, and an enclosed stair. The downstairs fireplace surrounds exhibit particularly fine 18th-century carving.

The construction date of the house and the rear ell are uncertain, owing to a lack of documentary record and conflicting architectural evidence. Construction of the rear ell is traditionally given as 1732, when Thomas Hurlburt owned this property, but it appears to have been extensively altered around 1760, when the main house was probably built by Elnathan Gridley. A house is documented as appearing here on a 1759 map, and the house was likely near its present form in 1781, when Elnathan Gridley's estate was inventoried. The property associated with the house originally extended all the way down to the Farmington River (across Farmington Avenue). The house underwent a major restoration in 1976, and now houses museum displays and offices of the historical society.

== See also ==
- National Register of Historic Places listings in Hartford County, Connecticut
