= Vineyard Vines =

American clothing brand

- Vineyard Vines shop in Edgartown, Martha's Vineyard
- Type: Private
- Founded: July 3, 1998; 28 years ago
- Founder: Shep & Ian Murray (Brothers)
- Headquarters: 181 Harbor Drive, Stamford, Connecticut, United States
- Number of locations: 100+
- Area served: Worldwide
- Products: Clothing and accessories
- Owner: Shep & Ian Murray (Brothers)
- Number of employees: 2800 (2018)
- Website: vineyardvines.com

Vineyard Vines is an American clothing and accessory retailer founded in 1998 in Martha’s Vineyard, Massachusetts, by brothers Shep and Ian Murray. The brand markets high-end ties, hats, belts, shirts, shorts, swimwear, and bags for men, women, and children. It has grown to a collection of retail stores and outlets across the United States. It is manufactured in Peru and Vietnam. The company's main logo is a pink whale.

== History ==
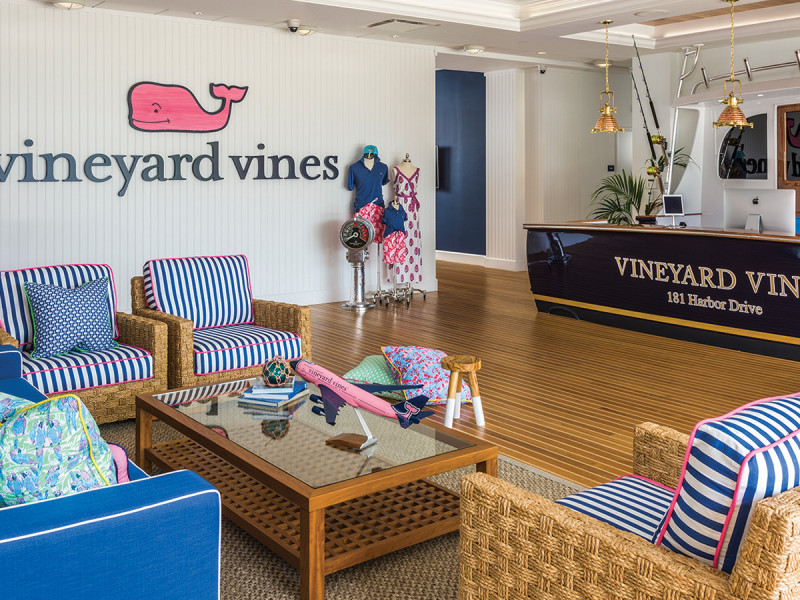
Inside Vineyard Vines Stamford headquarters

Shep and Ian Murray originally sold neckties on Martha's Vineyard, selling out of a backpack from their boat or Jeep rather than a storefront. Initially, they offered four different styles of ties. After they sold 800 ties on a single weekend in July, Shep and Ian quickly re-ordered more, paid off their accrued debt, and moved into a new office. The Murray brothers claim that the business was founded through a philosophy of "living the good life," which is reflected by their slogan "Every day should feel this good." Vineyard Vines is still owned outright by the two Murray brothers. The company's clothing has been described as preppy.

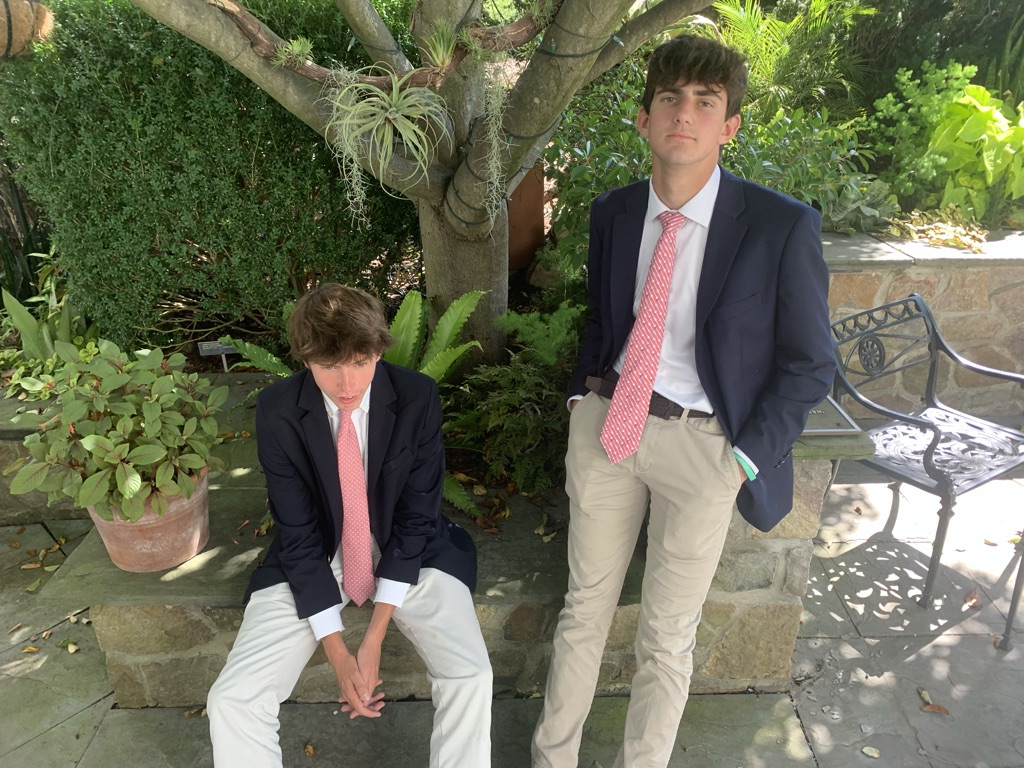
Two prep school students in Vineyard Vines attire

== Expansion ==
Since the summer of 1998, the Vineyard Vines company has expanded nationally, particularly along the East Coast of the United States. Vineyard Vines has opened numerous company, outlet, and retail stores. In addition to these traditional channels, Vineyard Vines has expanded its sales to online shoppers. The company manufactures licensed NFL and MLB product, which it sells through its retail channels. Vineyard Vines also manufactures licensed college apparel, which is sold primarily through campus stores. Vineyard Vines was placed on Inc. magazine's list of the 5000 fastest-growing businesses in the U.S. in 2007. Between 2004 and 2007, the relatively new company's revenue tripled. In 2015, the company inaugurated a new headquarters in Stamford, Connecticut. In 2016, Vineyard Vines had $476 million in sales. In that same year the company's total value was reportedly estimated to be one billion dollars by the financial firm Goldman Sachs. In 2019, Target Corporation offered a 300-product limited edition Vineyard Vines collection in stores and online. The campaign drew some criticism from customers, as many items sold out within an hour. All Vineyard Vines stores were temporarily closed in March 2020 due to the COVID-19 pandemic. Production is mostly offshore, including Vietnam, China, and South America.

== Stores ==
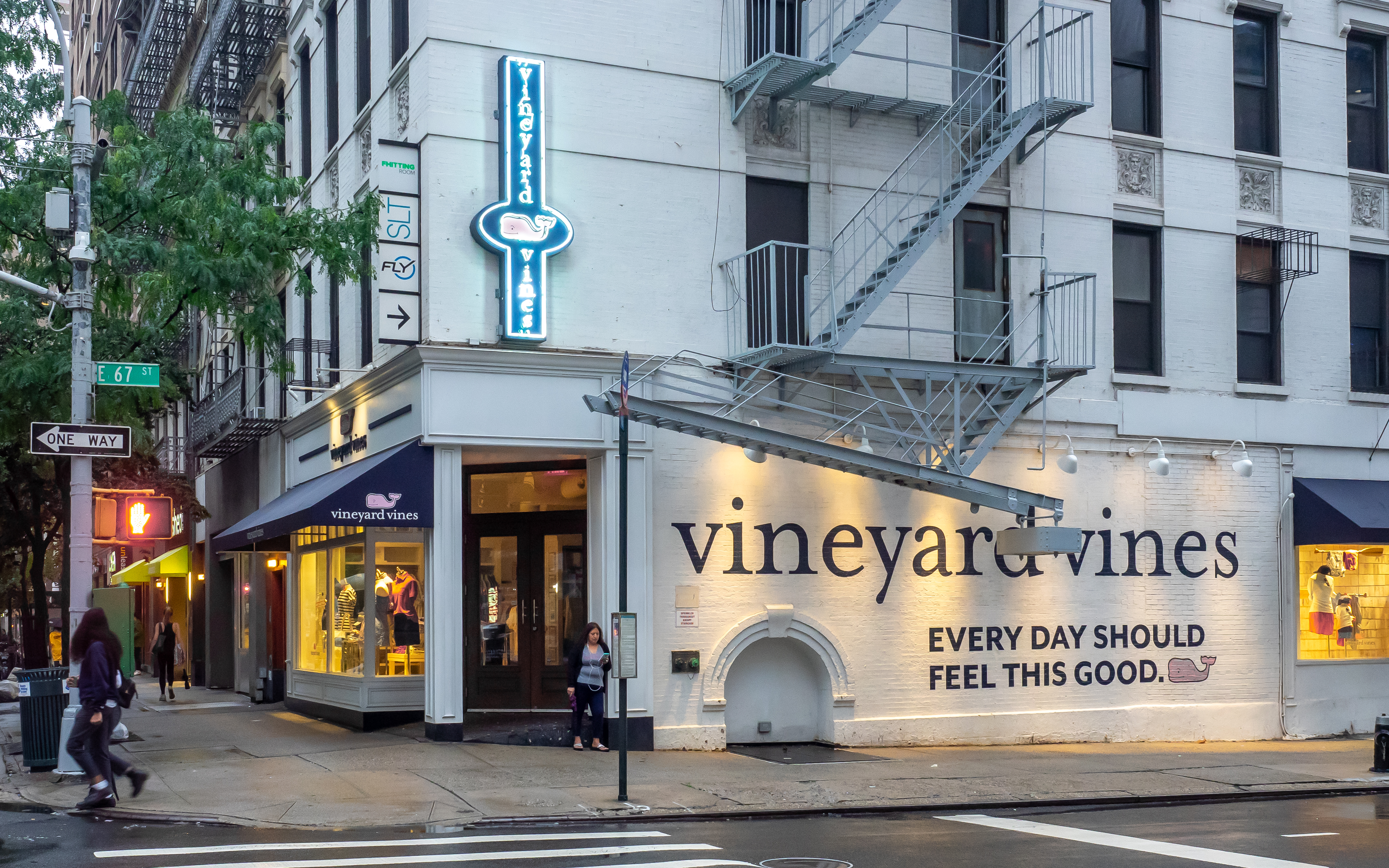
A Vineyard Vines store in Manhattan

The first stores were opened in Northeastern locations associated with the sea such as Martha's Vineyard. The first was in Edgartown, Martha's Vineyard, followed by Greenwich, Connecticut. The company has expanded to more than 100 stores across the U.S. states and the brand is sold by over 600 other retailers.

== See also ==
- J. Crew
- Lily Pulitzer
- J. Jill
- Paul Stuart
- Brooks Brothers
- J. Press
- Arrow Shirts
