= Shade Swamp Shelter =

Historic rustic shelter in Farmington, Connecticut, US

- U.S. National Register of Historic Places
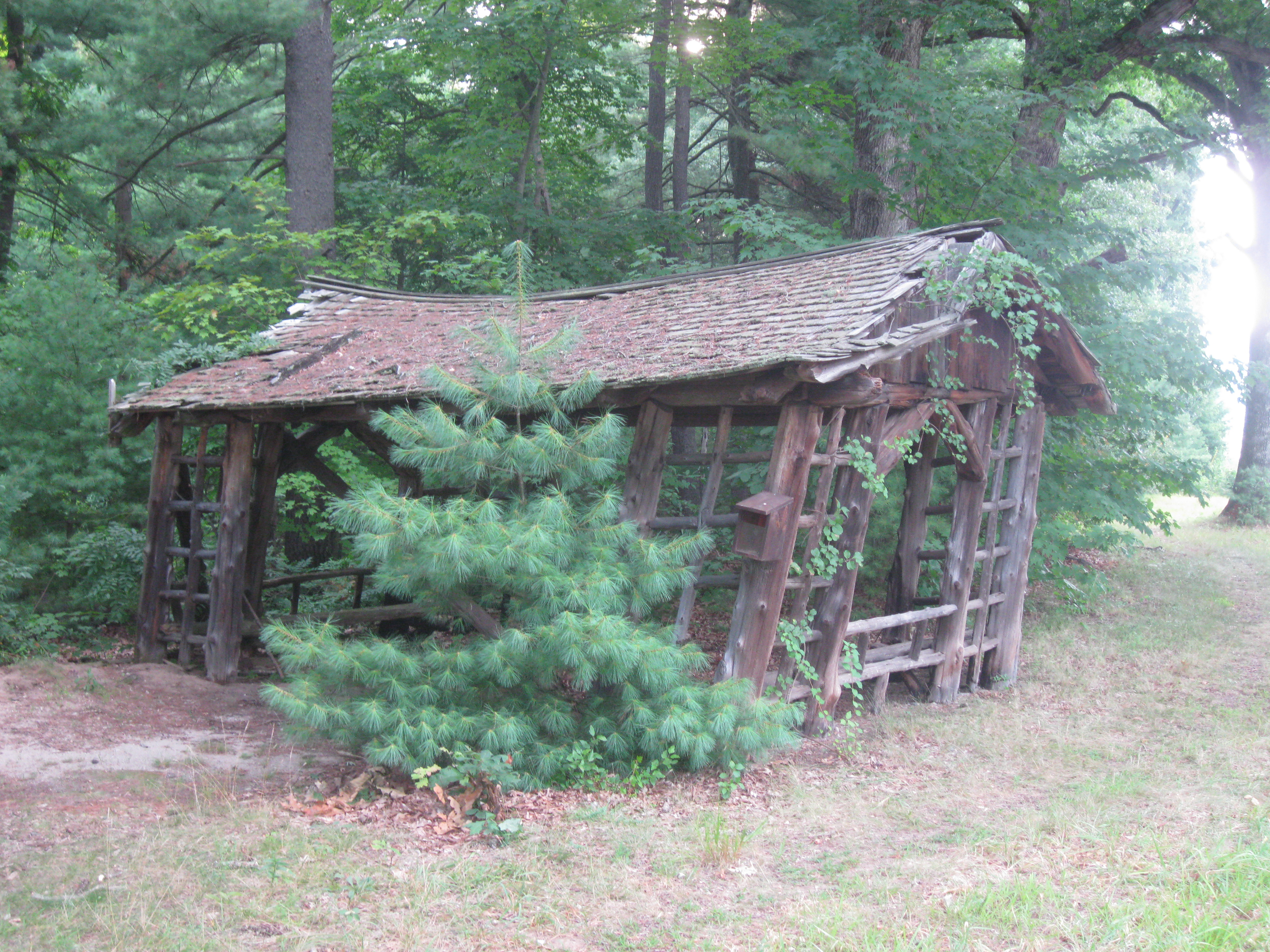

- Location within Connecticut Location within the United States
- Location: Route 6 East of New Britain Avenue, Farmington, Connecticut
- Coordinates: 41°42′15″N 72°51′35″W
- Area: 6.5 acres (2.6 ha)
- Built: 1934
- Architect: Civilian Conservation Corps
- Architectural style: Rustic
- MPS: Connecticut State Park and Forest Depression-Era Federal Work Relief Programs Structures TR
- NRHP reference No.: 86001746
- Added to NRHP: September 04, 1986

The Shade Swamp Shelter was a historic rustic shelter on the north side of Route 6, just east of New Britain Avenue in Farmington, Connecticut. Built in 1934 by a crew of the Civilian Conservation Corps (CCC), it was one of the state's finest examples of the CCC's Rustic architecture. It was listed on the National Register of Historic Places in 1986.

== Description and history ==
The Shade Swamp Shelter was located in Southwestern Farmington, a largely rural-suburban area. It stood at the southern end of the Shade Swamp Wildlife Management area, a 174-acre (70 ha) state-owned area bounded on the south by Route 6, and the west by New Britain Avenue, with the Pequabuck River draining most of its swampland near its eastern edge. It stood adjacent to a small gravel parking area, which serves as a trailhead for a Blue-Blazed Trail into the area. It was a modest open post-and-beam log structure, with lattice framing at the corners and diagonal support braces. The interior floor was flagstone, with a rustic bench built around the perimeter. The roof was supported by log rafters and finished in wooden shingles; in a distinctive flourish, the interior ceiling was finished in white birch logs arranged in a chevron pattern.

The state began acquiring portions of Shade Swamp as a management area beginning in 1926. The shelter was built in 1934 by the Civilian Conservation Corps, as part of a trail-building program into the underutilized area.

The structure is no longer standing, having collapsed sometime between 2021 and early 2022, but remnants of the stone floor exist at its site.

== See also ==
- National Register of Historic Places listings in Hartford County, Connecticut
