= Gregg Renfrew =

American entrepreneur and businessperson

- Born: 1968 (age 57–58)
- Education: Miss Porter's School University of Vermont
- Occupations: Founder and CEO of Beautycounter

Gregg Renfrew is an American entrepreneur and businessperson. She co-launched U.S. operations of The Wedding List, which was later acquired by Martha Stewart in 2001, making it the first acquisition under the Martha Stewart Living brand. In March 2013, Renfrew founded Beautycounter, a beauty brand focused on creating safer skincare and cleaner cosmetics products.

== Career ==
When Renfrew was still an undergraduate at the University of Vermont (from which she graduated in 1990), she started a house-cleaning company one summer with two friends on Nantucket. She later co-founded the bridesmaid company Elizabeth Gregg. Subsequently, she was introduced to Nicole Hindmarch, founder of the London-based bridal-registry company The Wedding List, and the two partnered to launch The Wedding List in the United States in 1997. Renfrew created a website to make this personalized shopping service an online experience. Nordstrom invested $1 million in the company. Martha Stewart partnered with The Wedding List to help broaden the commerce angle in her weddings magazine—and ended up acquiring the company in 2001. Renfrew continued running The Wedding List within the Martha Stewart Living brand.

In 2001, Renfrew began a retail consulting practice and worked with companies such as J.Crew, Bergdorf Goodman, and Intermix. In 2006, she became CEO of children's retail organization Best & Co. Renfrew left Best & Co. in March 2008 and moved to Los Angeles. She resumed retail consulting and worked with Jessica Alba.

Renfrew launched Beautycounter, a beauty brand committed to creating safer products, in March 2013. She worked with the company to establish a list of 1,800 potentially harmful ingredients, known as the "Never List," that Beautycounter avoids in its products.

In 2014, Renfrew was named one of Fast Company's Most Creative People and, in 2019, became a member of the publication's Impact Council.

In 2018, Renfrew was named on Inc. Magazine's Female Founders 100 list and was also included on Goldman Sach's Most Intriguing Entrepreneurs list.

Renfrew has been known to actively lobby for regulation in the cosmetics industry to limit the number of harmful chemicals in products sold in America. In December 2019, she testified as an expert witness in a Congressional hearing on cosmetic reform.

In January 2021, it was announced that Renfrew was an early investor in Thirteen Lune, an e-commerce site focused on makeup, skincare, hair care, and wellness products owned by people of color, and allied brands.

In April 2024, Renfrew bought back Beautycounter from private-equity firm The Carlyle Group.
