= Beautycounter =

American skincare and cosmetics company

- Industry: Skin care, cosmetics
- Founded: 2013
- Founder: Gregg Renfrew
- Defunct: April 27, 2024
- Headquarters: Santa Monica, California
- Website: beautycounter.com

Beautycounter was an American direct to consumer and multi-level marketing company that sold skin care and cosmetic products. As of 2018, the company had 150 products with over 65,000 independent consultants, and with national retailers. In April 2021, Beautycounter was acquired by The Carlyle Group in a deal that valued the company at $1 billion. In March 2024, Carlyle wrote off its investment in the company and the company went into administration in April 2024.

== History ==
Beautycounter was founded by Gregg Renfrew in 2013. Renfrew had previously worked with merchandising executives such as Martha Stewart and Susie Hilfiger. Beautycounter released nine products in March 2013, including facial cleansers, eye creams, and shampoo. The company launched as a direct retail brand, selling through its website, independent consultants, and retailers including J.Crew, Target and Sephora.

Beautycounter was one of Alluremagazine's Best of Beauty award recipients for their lip sheer in twig (2014) and dew skin tinted moisturizer (2015). Beautycounter became a founding member of the nonprofit Environmental Working Group's verification program, which aims to make it easier for consumers to identify consumer goods that do not contain toxic ingredients. The company compiled a "never list" of reportedly harmful chemicals omitted from their products.

In 2015,Beautycounter launched its first mascara line. Later that year, Beautycounter's Lengthening Mascara was one of Allure's Best of Beauty products in the natural category. In June 2016, Beautycounter acquired the worldwide assets of Nude Skincare, Inc. and Nude Brands, Ltd., Ali Hewson's natural beauty line, from LVMH. As part of the acquisition, Hewson's husband Bono became an investor in Counter Brands, LLC., Beautycounter's parent company, and Hewson became a board member.

In 2018, the company opened its first brick and mortar store in Manhattan. A second location opened in 2019, in Denver, Colorado. In March, the company was named to Fast Company's Most Innovative Companies list, for its efforts to promote nontoxic ingredients in beauty products. In June, the company was also named to CNBC's 2020 Disruptor 50 list, as a next generation billion dollar business. In December, the company opened a hybrid retail store and livestream content studio in Los Angeles.

In February 2020, the company released a documentary Transparency: The Truth About Mica, as part of its efforts to promote ethical mining. The documentary films an in-person audit of the company's mica supply chain, to ensure responsible sourcing.

In April 2021, American private equity firm The Carlyle Group acquired a majority stake in Beautycounter in a roughly $600 million acquisition which valued parent Counter Brands, LLC. at $1B.

In January 2022, Marc Rey was named as the company's new CEO, and founder Renfrew became executive chair.

In May 2023, Marc Rey stepped down as CEO and Beautycounter's board director, Mindy Mackenzie was announced as interim CEO before the return of Renfrew to lead the company.

The company went into administration in April 2024 following Carlyle's decision in mid-March to walk away from its investment in the company. Renfrew purchased rights to the Beautycounter name and additional assets in administration at a cost of several million dollars with plans to relaunch the company later in the year.

== Legislation ==
In 2014, Renfrew hired public health and environmental advocate Lindsay Dahl to lead company advocacy and lobbying efforts to reduce harmful chemicals used in the cosmetic industry. Renfrew and Beautycounter hosted a congressional briefing in Washington, D.C., in fall 2015, regarding the potential dangers of under-regulated beauty products. In May 2016, Renfrew went to Washington, D.C., with a group of 100 women representing all 50 U.S. states to discuss the importance of regulation in the beauty industry with senators, representatives, and legislative staff. Renfrew also testified in a congressional hearing on cosmetic reform in December 2019.

In 2021, Beautycounter led two days of virtual lobbying with members of Congress on federal standards regarding clean beauty.
