= Austin F. Williams Carriagehouse and House =

Historic house in Connecticut, United States

- U.S. National Register of Historic Places
- U.S. National Historic Landmark
- U.S. Historic district – Contributing property
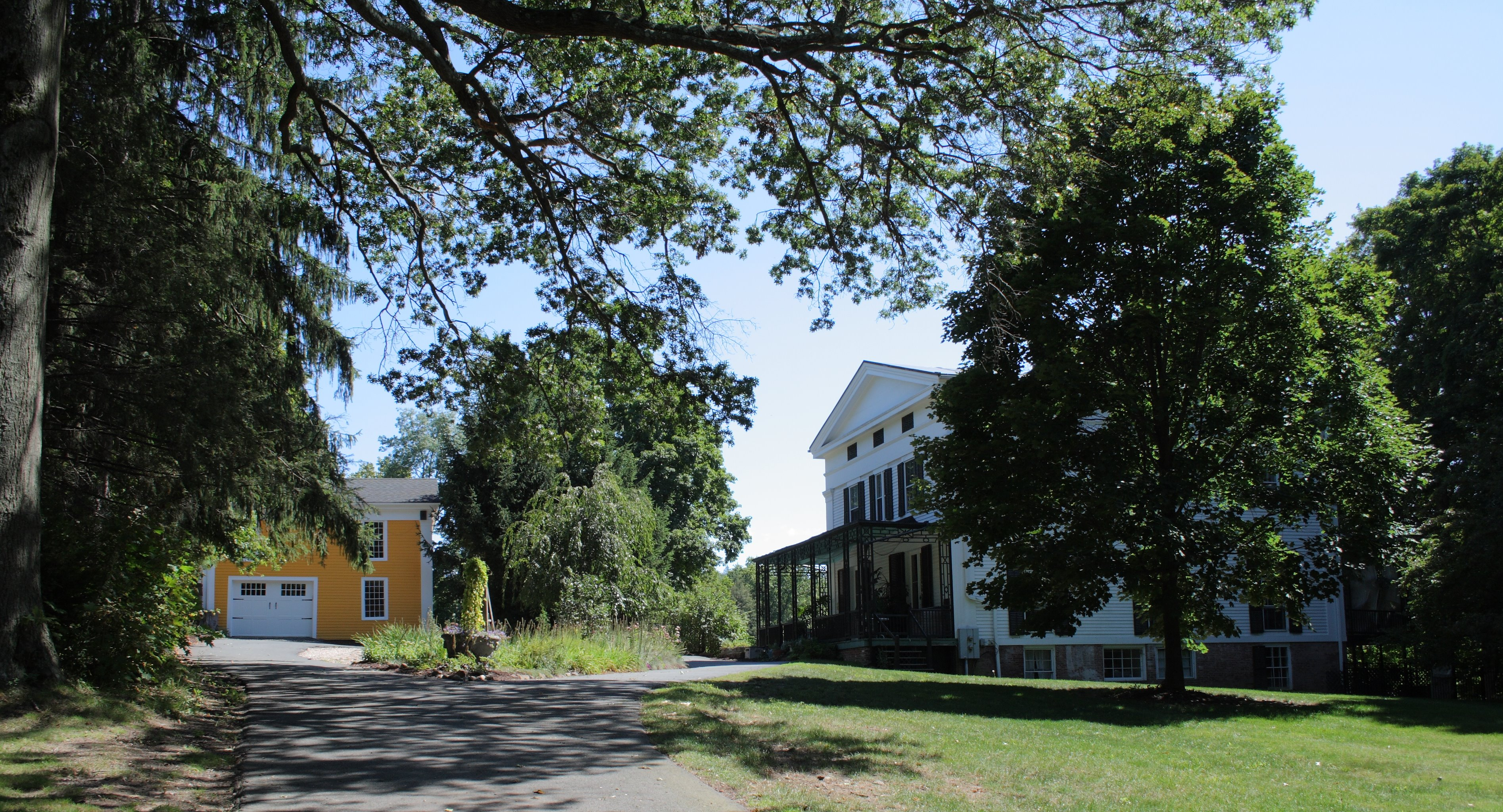

- Location within Connecticut Location within the United States
- Location: 127 Main Street, Farmington, Connecticut
- Coordinates: 41°43′21.5″N 72°49′40.7″W
- Area: 2.6 acres (1.1 ha)
- Built: 1842
- Architect: Chauncy Wells and Cephas Skinner
- Architectural style: Greek Revival
- Part of: Farmington Historic District (ID72001331)
- NRHP reference No.: 98001190

Significant dates
- Added to NRHP: August 5, 1998
- Designated NHL: August 6, 1998
- Designated CP: March 17, 1972

The Austin F. Williams Carriagehouse and House is a historic house at 127 Main Street in Farmington, Connecticut. Built in the mid-19th century, the property was designated a National Historic Landmark for the role it played in the celebrated case of the Amistad Africans, and as a "station" on the Underground Railroad.

== Description and history ==
Austin Williams (1805–1885) and his wife Jennet Cowles Williams were abolitionists. This property first became important in the Amistad case. When the Mende men who had participated in the revolt on the slave ship La Amistad were released from prison in 1841, Williams purchased this property and erected a dormitory building in which the Mende men could stay while awaiting arrangements for their return to Africa. Williams was friends with Lewis Tappan who was assisting the Africans. The structure that was built is now part of the carriage house. The men did agricultural work during this period. In 1842, the Williamses built their Greek Revival house. The cellar of the carriage house served as a hiding place for escaping slaves as a part of the Underground Railroad.

The site was declared a National Historic Landmark in 1998. It is located at 127 Main Street in Farmington and is part of the Farmington Historic District. The house is a private residence and is not open to the public.

== See also ==
- List of National Historic Landmarks in Connecticut
- National Register of Historic Places listings in Hartford County, Connecticut
- List of Underground Railroad sites
