= Chrishaunda Lee =

American film producer

Chrishaunda Lee Perez is a writer and film producer known for her work as co-writer and co-producer of the short film, The Forever Tree. She also wrote the book Share The Dream: Building Noah's Ark One Prayer at a Time.

== Career ==
Lee Perez earned her start in entertainment first serving as a publicist. She then worked in front of the camera corresponding on The Oprah Winfrey Show in 2004, and later on Entertainment Tonight in 2005. A long-time animal advocate, Chrishaunda co-hosted the show, Animal Attractions for PBS in 2007.

More recently, Lee Perez released her first novel, We Come as Girls, We Leave as Women, about high school senior girls overcoming personal challenges as they head towards graduation.

== Personal life and education ==
Lee Perez is a graduate of Wesleyan University. A niece of the billionaire Oprah Winfrey, she also graduated from Miss Porter's School. As a result of the changes that Winfrey saw in her niece after she attended the school, she created five permanent scholarships there.
