= Farmington Historic District (Farmington, Connecticut) =

Historic district in Connecticut, United States

- U.S. National Register of Historic Places
- U.S. Historic district
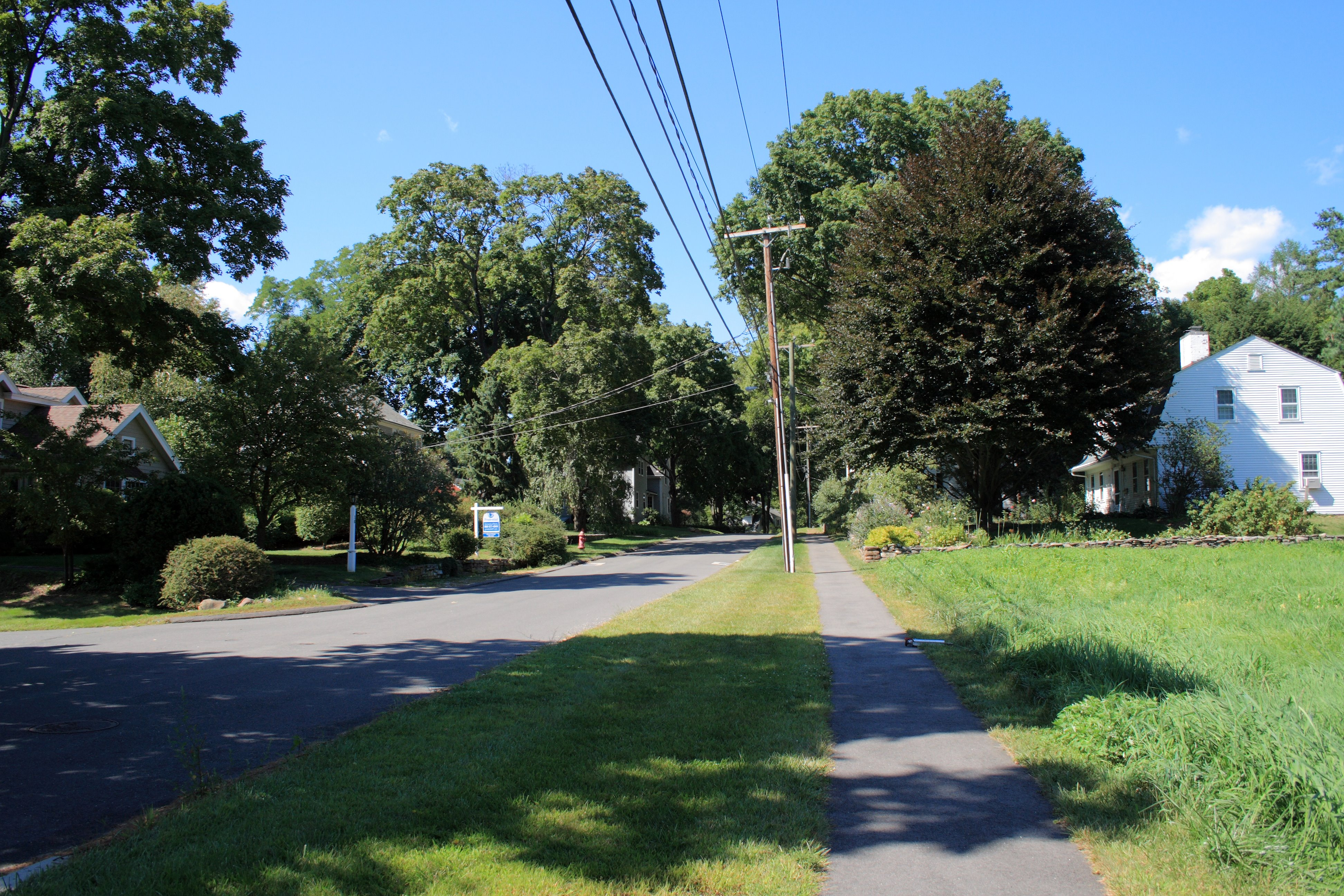
- A view of Farmington Center

- Location within Connecticut Location within the United States
- Location: Farmington, Connecticut
- Coordinates: 41.72°N 72.83°W
- Area: 275 acres (111 ha)
- Architect: Woodruff, Judah
- Architectural style: Greek Revival
- NRHP reference No.: 72001331
- Added to NRHP: March 17, 1972

The Farmington Historic District encompasses a 275-acre (111 ha) area of the town center of Farmington, Connecticut. It was listed on the National Register of Historic Places in 1972. The area roughly corresponds to the section of Route 10 between Route 4 and U.S. Route 6, and includes 115 buildings, primarily residences, built before 1835. The district includes several National Historic Landmarks, include Hill-Stead, the Austin F. Williams Carriagehouse and House, the First Church of Christ, Congregational, and the Stanley-Whitman House.

The town of Farmington was settled in 1640 and incorporated in 1645. It flourished during the 18th century, with a variety of trade and industry, that for a time rivaled the economic importance of Hartford. In the early 19th century it benefited for a time from the construction of the Farmington Canal, which passed through the town. The c. 1830 brick Union Hotel, located in the town center, was built to serve travelers on the canal, and is now an administration building for Miss Porter's School. The town's Main Street was laid out at an early date, and retained its appearance in part because the town's economy declined with the advent of the railroad (which bypassed the town) and the decline of the canal.

Several of the district's building were constructed by Judah Woodruff, a prominent local builder. Among these is the First Church, built in 1771. It is one of the state's only surviving colonial era churches, specifically retaining the original orientation of its main entrance and pulpit on the long sides of the building.

== See also ==
- National Register of Historic Places listings in Hartford County, Connecticut
