= People's United Financial =

American banking company

People's United Financial, Inc.

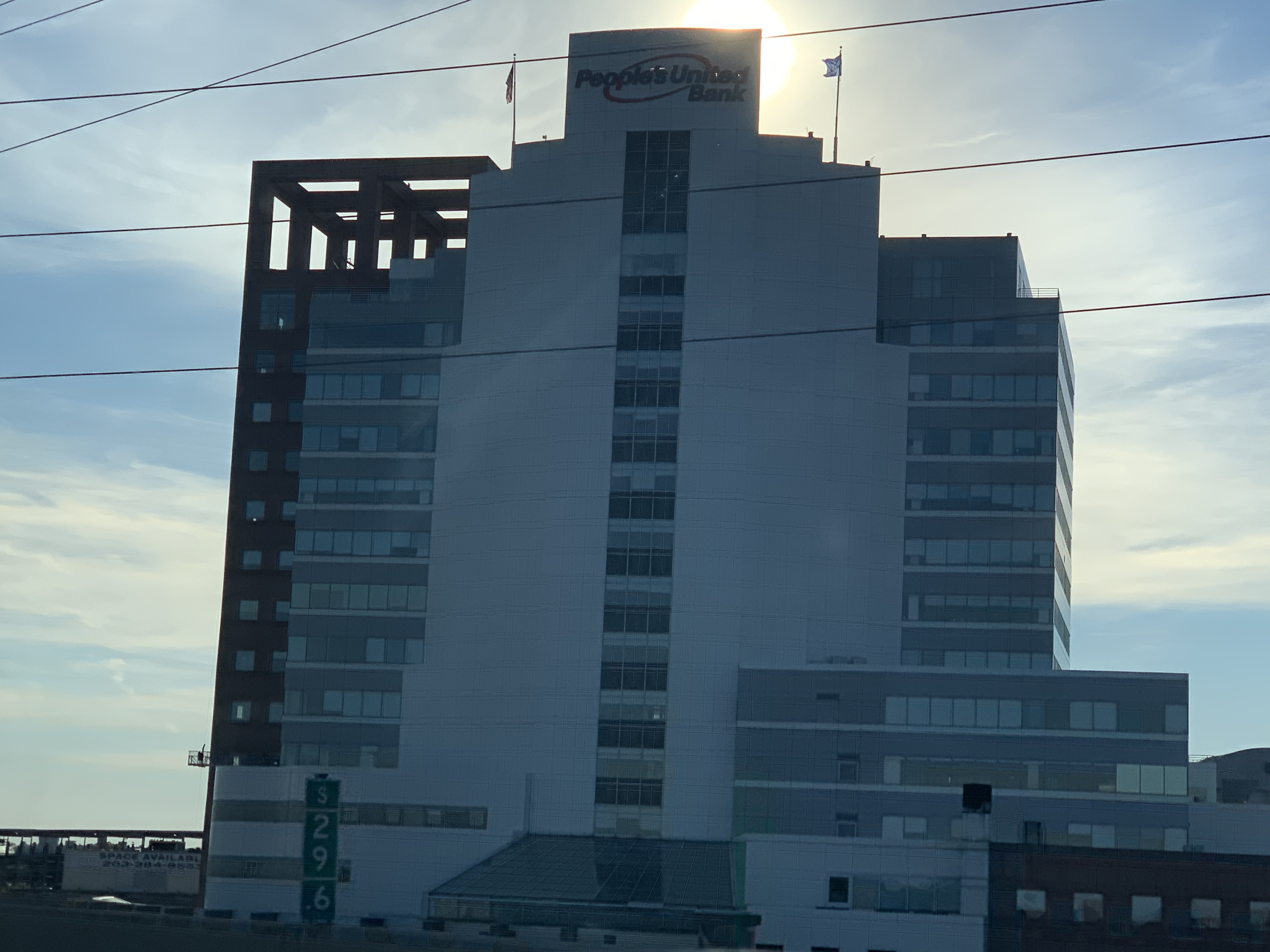
- Bridgeport Center, the headquarters of People’s United Bank
- Formerly: Bridgeport Savings Bank (1842–1927); Bridgeport-People's Savings Bank (1927–1955); People's Savings Bank-Bridgeport (1955–1983); People's Bank (1983–2007)
- Type: Subsidiary
- Traded as: Nasdaq: PBCT
- Industry: Financial services
- Founded: 1842; 184 years ago (as Bridgeport Savings Bank)
- Defunct: April 2, 2022; 4 years ago
- Fate: Acquired by M&T Bank
- Successor: M&T Bank
- Headquarters: Bridgeport, Connecticut
- Number of locations: 348 (2022)
- Key people: George P. Carter (chairman); John P. Barnes (CEO); R. David Rosato (CFO)
- Total assets: ▲$58.590 billion (2019)
- Total equity: ▲$7.947 billion (2019)
- Number of employees: 5,188 (2017)
- Website: www.mtb.com

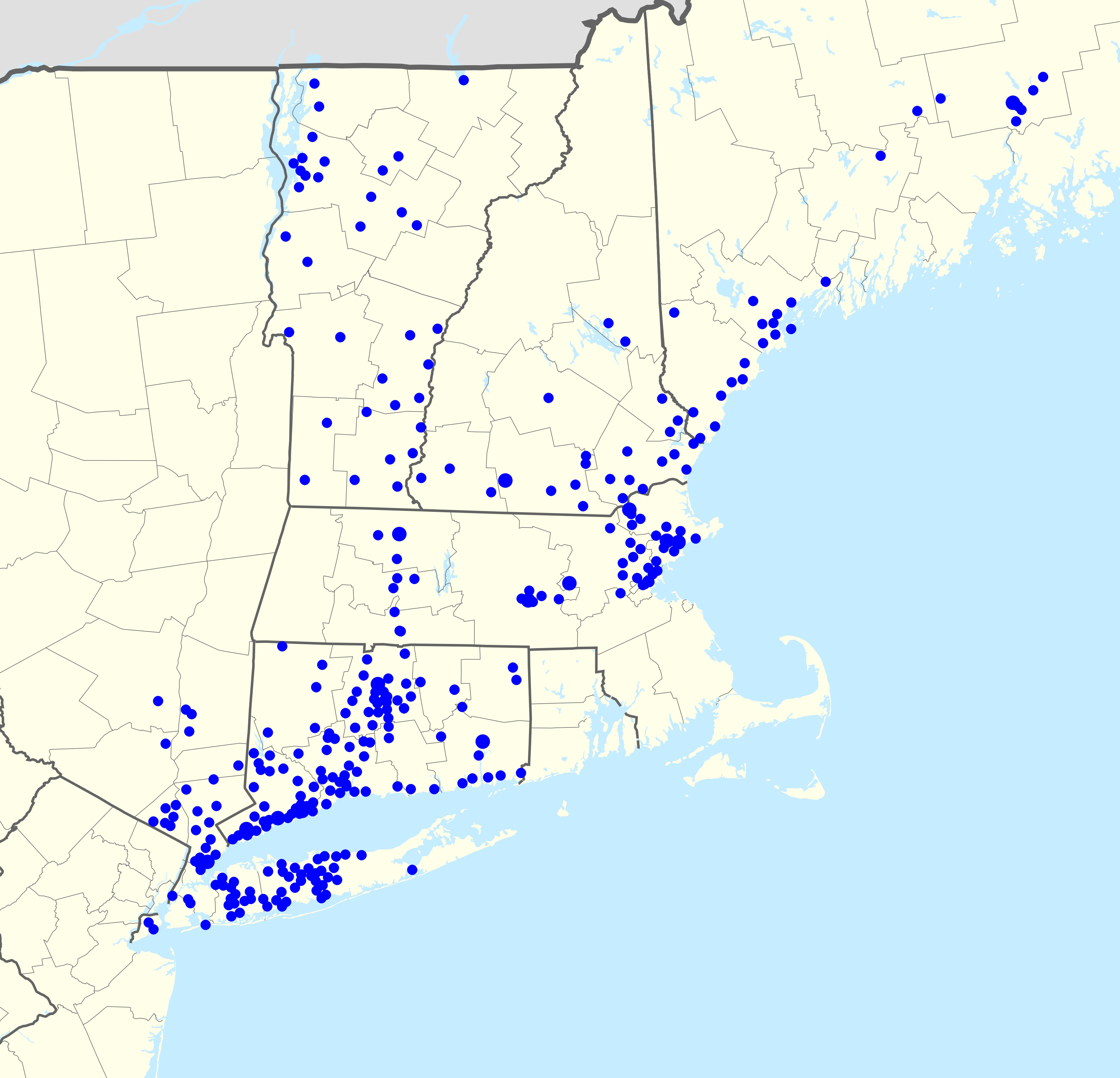
Map of People's United branches as of March 2013.

People's United Financial, Inc., was an American bank holding company that owned People's United Bank. The bank operated 403 branches in Connecticut, southeastern New York State, Massachusetts, Vermont, Maine, and New Hampshire. It was the second-largest full-service bank in New England, one of the largest in the northeast, and the 46th-largest in the United States.

On April 2, 2022, the bank merged with M&T Bank and was fully integrated into M&T by the third quarter of 2022.

== History ==
The company was founded in 1842 as Bridgeport Savings Bank in Bridgeport, Connecticut. After acquiring People's Bank of Vernon, CT, in 1983, the company was renamed People's Bank. It then acquired several other banks in New England to become the second largest in the region.

In 1985, the company began issuing credit cards, but by 2004, it sold its credit card division to the Royal Bank of Scotland at a premium of $360 million. The company moved to a new headquarters building designed by Richard Meier in 1989.

On June 7, 2007, the bank changed its name to People's United Bank.

In February 2008, a data storage company, Archive America, lost backup tapes in transit containing the "names, birthdays, Social Security numbers and other information" of customers of the bank and of The Bank of New York Mellon. On November 22, 2010, the bank opened its first location in Boston.

People's United was notably selected to manage the core bank accounts for the Commonwealth of Massachusetts in November 2016, and was also selected to manage the core bank accounts for the state of Vermont in August 2017.

On February 22, 2021, M&T Bank, based in Buffalo, New York, announced an agreement to acquire People's United Bank in an all-stock transaction valued at approximately $7.6 billion.

=== Acquisition history ===
From its founding as Bridgeport Savings Bank to the present, People's United has acquired several banks and other financial institutions in New England including:

=== 20th century ===
- 1955: acquired Southport Savings Bank
- 1981: acquired the assets of First Stamford Bank and Trust Company
- 1982: acquired Guardian Federal Savings and Loan Association of Bridgeport
- 1986: acquired First Federal Savings Bank
- 1991: acquired the deposits of Hartford-based Landmark Bank
- 1998: acquired Norwich Financial Corporation for $164 million in cash

=== 21st century ===
- January 1, 2008: acquired Chittenden Corporation for $1.9 billion Also in 2008, the bank acquired Ocean Bank of New Hampshire, Maine Bank & Trust, Merrill Merchants Bank, Flagship Bank, and Bank of Western Massachusetts.
- February 2010: acquired Financial Federal Corporation, an equipment financing company
- April 2010: acquired Butler Bank, which was seized by the Federal Deposit Insurance Corporation
- December 2010: acquired LSB Corporation and Smithtown Bancorp
- July 2011: acquired Danvers Bancorp
- 2012: acquired 57 branches in the greater New York metro area from Royal Bank of Scotland, including 53 branches in Stop & Shop supermarkets
- October 2015: People's United subsidiary acquired Kesten-Brown Insurance
- April 2017: acquired Suffolk Bancorp
- July 2017: acquired LEAF Commercial Capital
- June 2018: People's United Bank agreed to purchase Farmington Bank in a deal valued at $544 million
- November 2019: acquired Connecticut-based United Financial Bancorp.

== Headquarters ==
People's United Financial's headquarters was built in 1989, designed by architect Richard Meier. Rising 18 stories above the northern side of I-95, the People's Bank Building (known officially as Bridgeport Center) is the tallest building in downtown Bridgeport.
