= Lilly Pulitzer =

American entrepreneur and fashion designer (1931–2013)

- Born: Lillian Lee McKim; November 10, 1931; Roslyn, New York, U.S.
- Died: April 7, 2013 (aged 81); Palm Beach, Florida, U.S.
- Education: Finch College
- Occupation: Fashion designer
- Known for: Lilly Pulitzer brand
- Notable work: The Lilly Shift Dress
- Spouses: Herbert Pulitzer (m. 1950; div. 1969) Enrique Rousseau (m. 1969; died 1993)
- Children: 3
- Relatives: Patsy Pulitzer (sister-in-law)
- Website: www.lillypulitzer.com

Lillian Pulitzer Rousseau (November 10, 1931 – April 7, 2013) was an American entrepreneur, fashion designer, and socialite. She founded Lilly Pulitzer, Inc., a clothing brand known for resort-inspired apparel, accessories, and other wares featuring vibrant prints.

== Early Life & Background ==
Pulitzer was born in Roslyn, New York to Lillian Bostwick and Robert McKim. She was educated at the Chapin School and graduated from Miss Porter’s School in Farmington, Connecticut in 1949. [citation]

While vacationing in Palm Beach, Florida, she met Herbert (Peter) Pulitzer Jr., grandson of Joseph Pulitzer. The couple eloped in 1950 and lived year-round in Palm Beach, an unusual choice at the time, as the resort town largely shut down during the summer months. Lilly soon became known for her bohemian lifestyle; the young socialite was often spotted on Worth Avenue barefoot with her pet monkey in tow.

== Career (1959-1985) ==
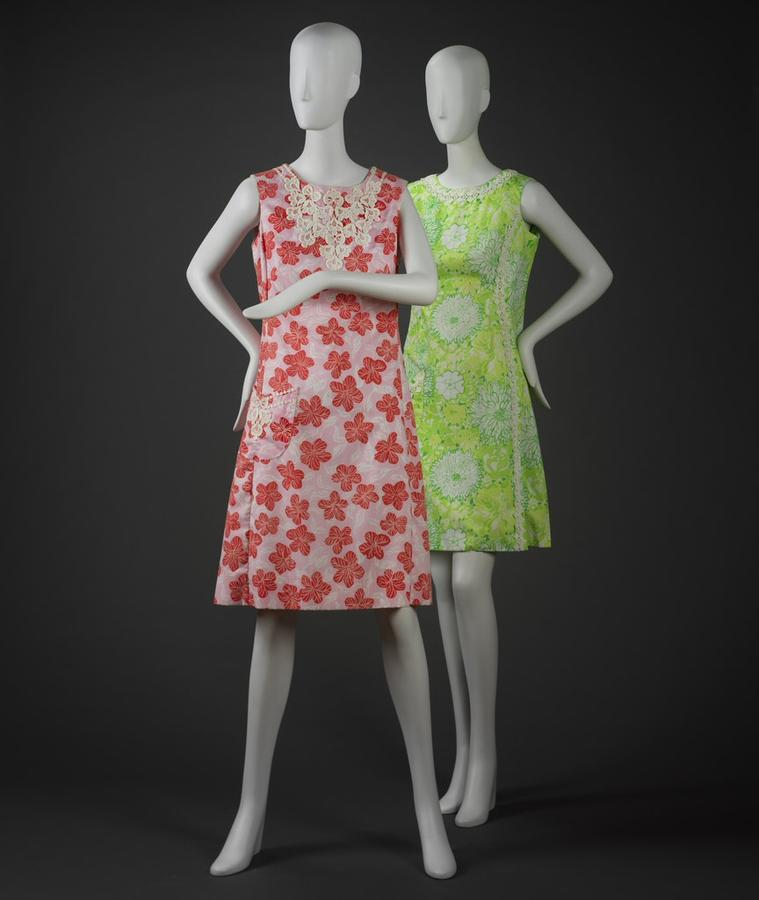
Lilly Pulitzer dresses in Suzie Zuzek prints, ca.1965 (RISD Museum)

In the late 1950s, Lilly struggled with her mental health; her daughter Liza later said, “In hindsight, I think it was really and truly postpartum [depression].” Doctors recommended that she find a renewed sense of purpose. The Pulitzer family owned several Florida orange groves, so she opened a fruit juice stand on Via Mizner in Palm Beach in 1958.

While working at the stand, Lilly found that squeezing juice made a mess of her clothes, so she asked her dressmaker to design something that would camouflage the stains. The result was a simple, comfortable shift dress made from colorful printed fabric. She discovered that customers loved the design, so she produced more dresses to sell at the stand. Eventually, Lilly started selling more dresses than juice and decided to focus on designing and selling the shifts that had become known as “Lillys.”

In 1959, Pulitzer become president of her own company, Lilly Pulitzer, Inc. The company’s main factory was located in Miami, Florida. Beginning in the early 1960s, its signature printed fabrics were produced by Key West Handprint Fabrics in Key West, Florida. At this time, many of Pulitzer’s prints were created by Suzie Zuzek, a well-known artist for Key West Hand Print Fabrics.

During the 1960s, the brand grew in popularity. Lilly Pulitzer outfits were worn by members of the Rockefeller, Vanderbilt, and Whitney families, as well as Lilly’s former Chapin School classmate Jacqueline Kennedy Onassis and her daughter Caroline Kennedy. Jackie was featured on the cover of Life magazine in 1962 wearing a Lilly Pulitzer dress, propelling the brand into the national spotlight.

In the early 1980s, changing fashion trends and declining sales influenced Pulitzer’s decision to shut down the brand and retire. Lilly Pulitzer, Inc. ceased all operations in 1985.

Brand Revival (1994-Present)

In 1994, rights to the Lilly Pulitzer brand were purchased by Sugartown Worldwide, Inc. Sugartown contacted Pulitzer with the hopes of reviving the brand because "they just loved Lilly, their mothers and sisters loved Lilly, and they wanted to bring the line back." On December 21, 2010, Sugartown Worldwide, Inc. was purchased by Oxford Industries, Inc.

Today, the company sells direct-to-consumer via their website and maintains over 60 company-owned retail stores and over 70 Signature Stores. Lilly Pulitzer stores can be found across the United States, with a focus on resort areas along the East Coast, as well as Texas, California, and Hawaii. Additional Lilly Pulitzer retailers include both independently owned shops and major department stores such as Belk, Von Maur, Nordstrom, and Saks Fifth Avenue. The brand’s corporate offices are located in King of Prussia, Pennsylvania.

== Products ==
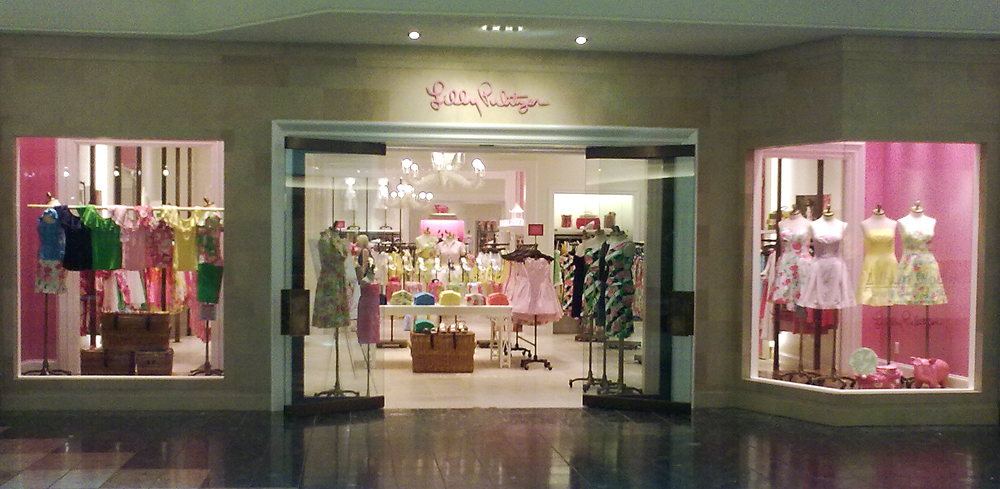
A Lilly Pulitzer store at The Gardens Mall in Palm Beach Gardens, Florida

Lilly Pulitzer is primarily known for women’s clothing, swimwear, shoes, and accessories, with a focus on warm weather apparel. The brand also offers children’s clothing, stationery, and a selection of tableware and décor goods. An exclusive Bridal Collection was produced in 2010. Lilly Pulitzer menswear was reintroduced in 2024 under the moniker “Men’s Stuff.” Also in 2024, the brand announced that it had acquired the rights to archival prints originally produced between 1962 and 1985, to be released as part of the “Lilly’s Vintage Vault” collection. Lilly Pulitzer offers limited-time online and in-store sale events throughout the year.

== Collaborations ==
Lilly published a pair of lifestyle books—Essentially Lilly: A Guide to Colorful Entertaining and Essentially Lilly: A Guide to Colorful Holidays—with author Jay Mulvaney. She also released two desk calendar books, Essentially Lilly 2005 Social Butterfly Engagement Calendar and Essentially Lilly 2006 Party Animal Engagement Calendar. Assouline published a Lilly Pulitzer coffee table book in 2019.

Prior to 2014, Lilly Pulitzer, Inc. partnered with various sororities to produce custom prints. In April 2015, Target announced a collaboration with the brand. Within hours, the collection was almost entirely sold out, in stores and online. Additional brand collaborations include Disney, Lee Jofa, Badgley Mischka, Lele Sadoughi, Saint James, Dee Ocleppo Hilfiger, and Pottery Barn.

Philanthropy

Since 2017, the Lilly Pulitzer Print with Purpose program has raised over $600,000 for philanthropic partners including Girls, Inc., Boys & Girls Clubs of America, First Tee, the WTA Foundation and the Breast Cancer Research Foundation.

== Personal life ==
Lilly and Peter Pulitzer had three children: Peter Jr. (born 1954), Minnie (born 1956), and Liza (born 1957). They divorced in 1969. Shortly after, she married Cuban émigré Enrique Rousseau. Although she legally changed her name to Lillian McKim Rousseau, her clothing company continued to operate under the "Lilly Pulitzer" label. They remained married until Rousseau’s death from cancer in 1993.

Death

Lilly Pulitzer died at her home in Palm Beach, Florida on April 7, 2013 at age 81.

== Cultural impact ==
In 1966, The Washington Post reported that Lilly dresses were "so popular that at the Southampton Lilly shop on Job's Lane they are proudly put in clear plastic bags tied gaily with ribbons so that all the world may see the Lilly of your choice. It's like carrying your own racing colors or flying a yacht flag for identification."

Lisa Birnbach's tongue-in-cheek guides, The Official Preppy Handbook (1980) and its sequel True Prep: It's a Whole New Old World (2010), feature Lilly Pulitzer clothes as must-have items for "preppy" women.

The Museum of Lifestyle & Fashion History in Boynton Beach, Florida, ran an exhibit from August 2010 through May 2011 about Lilly Pulitzer clothing and designs.

In 2024, the Ann Norton Sculpture Gardens in Palm Beach, Florida hosted an exhibition entitled “Slim Aarons: Gold Coast.” The exhibition highlighted Aarons' work in Palm Beach and how that work intertwined with local icon Lilly Pulitzer.

== Gallery ==
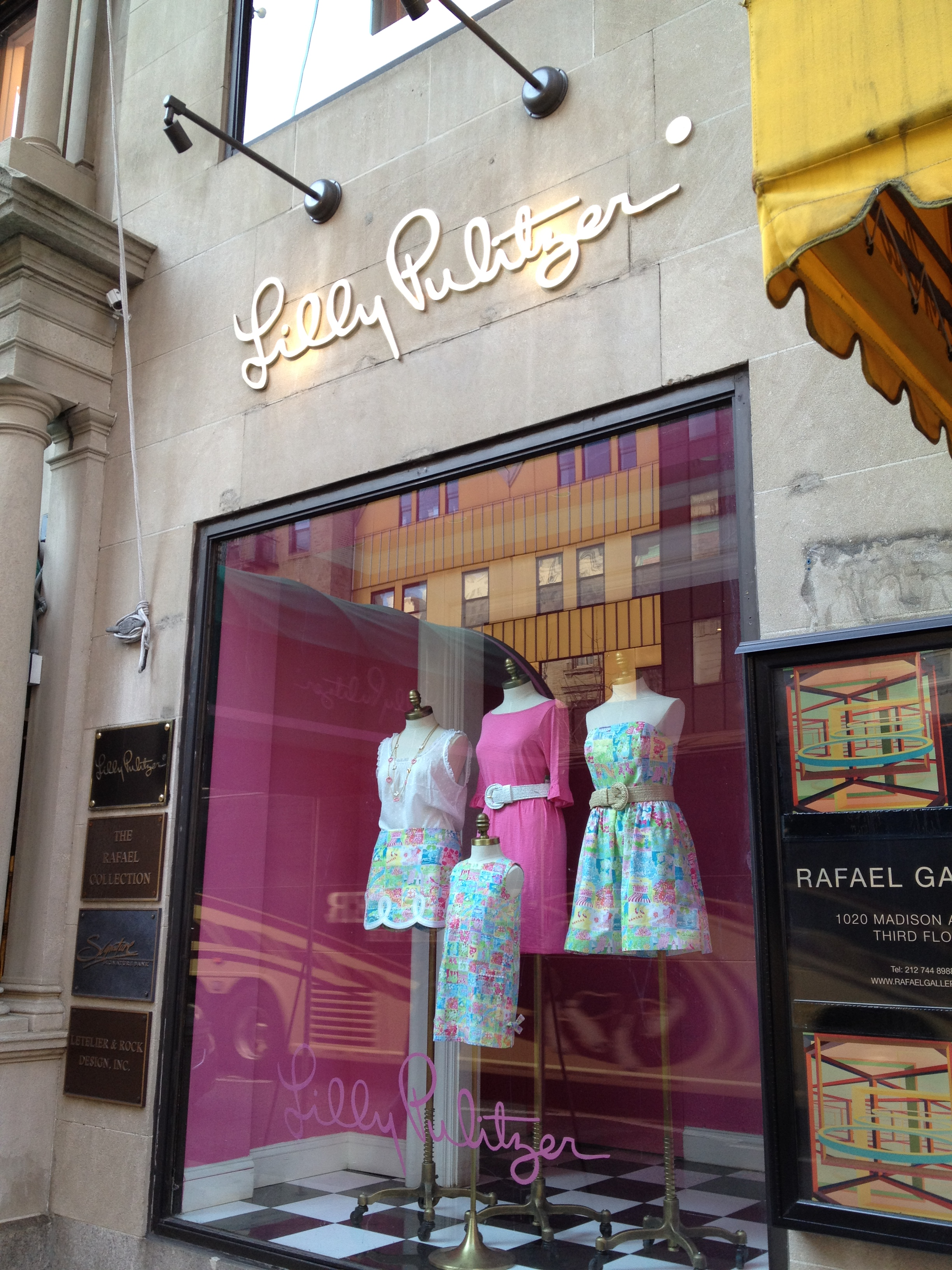

== See also ==
- J. Crew
- J. Jill
- Vineyard Vines
- Paul Stuart
- Brooks Brothers
- J. Press
- Arrow Shirts
