= Portrait of Madame Guillaume with a Large Hat =

Painting by André Derain

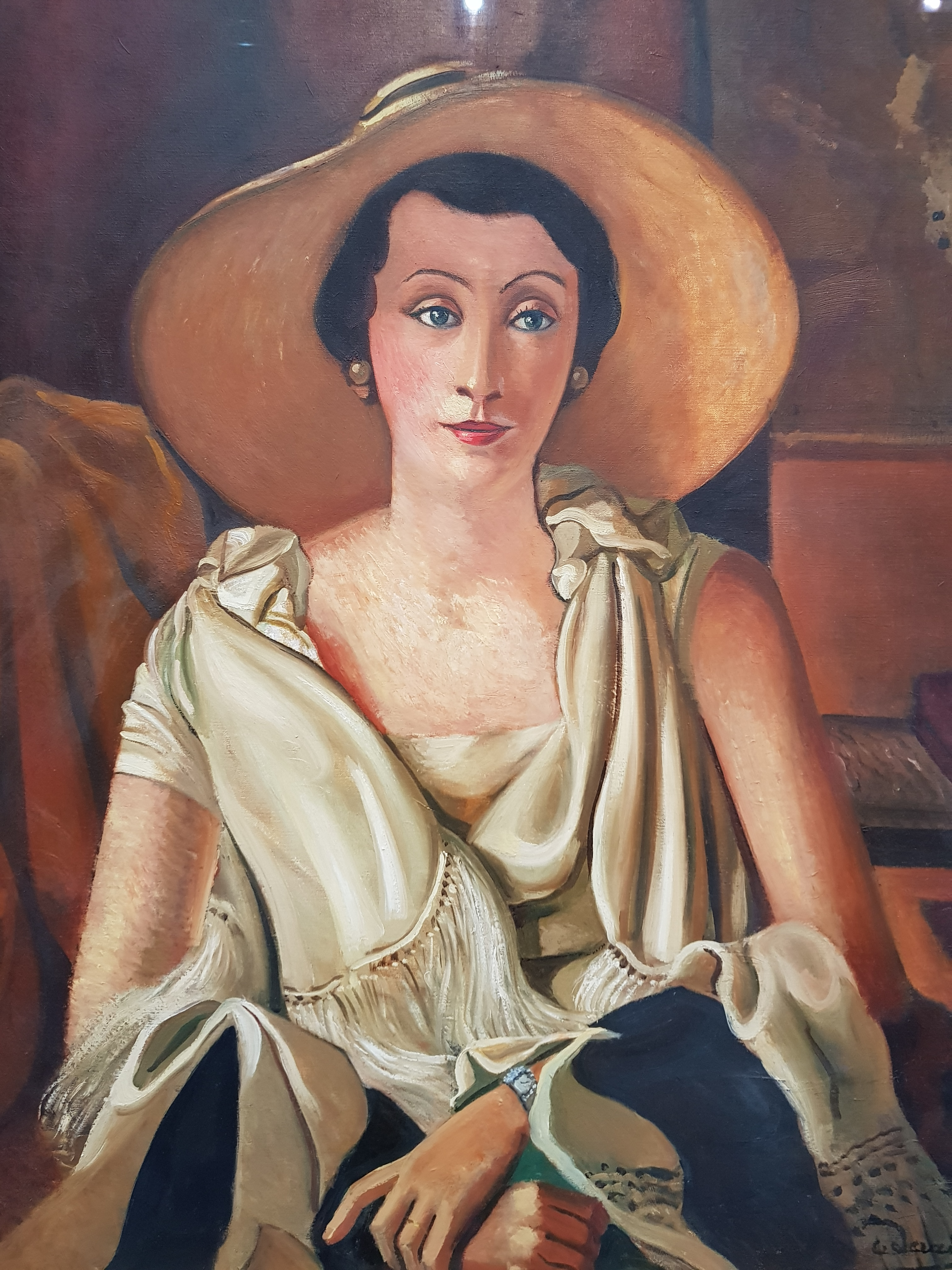
- Artist: André Derain
- Year: 1928-1929
- Medium: oil on canvas
- Dimensions: 92 cm × 73 cm (36 in × 29 in)
- Location: Musée de l'Orangerie; Paris

Portrait of Madame Guillaume with a Large Hat is an oil on canvas painting by French artist André Derain, from 1928 to 1929. It is held at the Musée de l'Orangerie, in Paris.

== History and description ==
Derain painted two portraits of Madame Juliette Lacaze Guillaume, known as Domenica, the first in 1925, and the current, created during the autumn or winter of 1928–1929. She was the wife of Paul Guillaume, a leading art dealer, and him and Domenica were at the height of their fame at that time.

In this portrait, skillfully staged with rich fabrics and draperies, Domenica appears as a woman of high society. The most remarkable is her majestic attitude and the exceptional brilliance of her eyes, enlivened by a touch of white that illuminates her pupils. This kind of effect is reminiscent of the Coptic portraits that Derain collected.

Domenica is seated, dressed in an elegant hat and stole and has a serious look, with her hands crossed. The painter managed to capture the mind of a woman, who, after the death of Guillaume, achieved a bad reputation as a manipulator of people, like her new husband, Jean Walter, and someone willing to do whatever necessary to keep her high social status. For many people afterwards, this portrait became a representation of the "evil" Domenica.

A painting or a sketch by Derain, depicting Pierrot and Arlequin, can be seen at the right background.

== Provenance ==
The work was part of Paul Guillaume collection until 1929, when it was acquired by Madame Jean Walter. In 1959 it was bought by the Louvre and is now exhibited in the Musée de l'Orangerie, in Paris.
