= Nicolas Cesbron =

French sculptor

Nicolas Cesbron is a French artist. He was born in Reims, in Champagne, France.

== Works ==
His work has been referred to as "the new Art Nouveau," walking the line between woodwork and sculpture. In an interview, he explained, "the objects I have carved a soul beyond the functionality."

Cesbron's studio is a remodeled ironworks space, at Saint Denis between Fort de Briche et le Boulevard Périphérique in Paris. He has shown his work in Barcelona, Brussels, Paris, and cities throughout Germany. A sculptural wooden staircase he created is installed in the Christian Louboutin Ginza boutique in Tokyo.

He was interested in woodworking as a child, but under pressure from his parents, studied physics instead. He went on to teach at a university in the Ivory Coast in West Africa where, in his spare time, he became interested in the African art of wood-carving. Thereafter, he returned to France and earned his Ph.D. in physics at a university there while developing his own woodworking skills.

Cesbron had his first major art exhibition in 1994 at the Musée de l'Orangerie in the center of Paris. It aroused a great deal of attention and after another year as a physicist at the university, he turned to art as a profession.
