= American Friends Musée d'Orsay =

Public non-profit charitable organization

AFMO, the American Friends Musée d'Orsay and the Musée de l'Orangerie, is a public non-profit charitable organization. Since its beginnings in 2009, AFMO has been committed to nurturing a collaborative French-American partnership in the arts by building support for the Orsay and Orangerie museums. About one million Americans visit the museums annually, the largest number of foreign visitors. AFMO's support for exhibitions, collection care and acquisitions, education, and building renovations, enriches the experiences of Americans and French citizens in the U.S. and in Paris.

This support also enables paintings from the Musée d'Orsay to travel to American museums. AFMO acquires works of art to lend and gift to the museums.

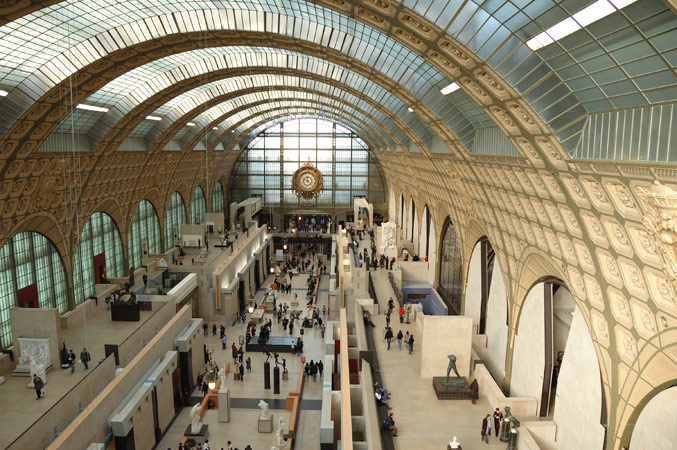
Musée d'Orsay, Paris, France

== Support ==
AFMO supports various programs within the Musée d'Orsay to promote cultural enrichment and to enhance Americans' experiences with the museum:

== Events ==
As a non-profit, AFMO organizes a variety of fundraising programs and activities throughout the year. Members and their friends are invited to join AFMO's numerous exclusive events in the United States and in Paris. Among these, members can enjoy domestic and international travels with exclusive, private museum and gallery tours, as well as the October Paris Weekend and much awaited Annual Gala at the Orsay, AFMO's major fundraising event.

AFMO's most recent and current events

October 17–20, 2019	Paris, France	AFMO Annual Gala
April 24–26, 2019	Dallas and Fort Worth, Texas	AFMO Spring Event around the Orsay exhibition Berthe Morisot: Woman Impressionist
October 18–21, 2018	Paris, France	A Weekend in Paris
April 26–27, 2018	Washington, District of Columbia	AFMO Spring Event around the Orsay exhibition Cezanne Portraits
October 19–22, 2017	Paris, France	AFMO Autumn in Paris Weekend
September 27, 2017	New York, New York	Celebrating Laurence Des Cars, newly appointed President at the Orsay and Orangerie, at the home of Mrs. Spencer Hays
October 23–26, 2016	Paris, France	AFMO October Celebration Event
February 3–5, 2016	San Francisco, California	AFMO Spring Tour around the exhibition Pierre Bonnard: Painting Arcadia
