= Haystacks (Monet series) =

1890–91 series of paintings by Claude Monet

Wheatstacks (End of Summer)
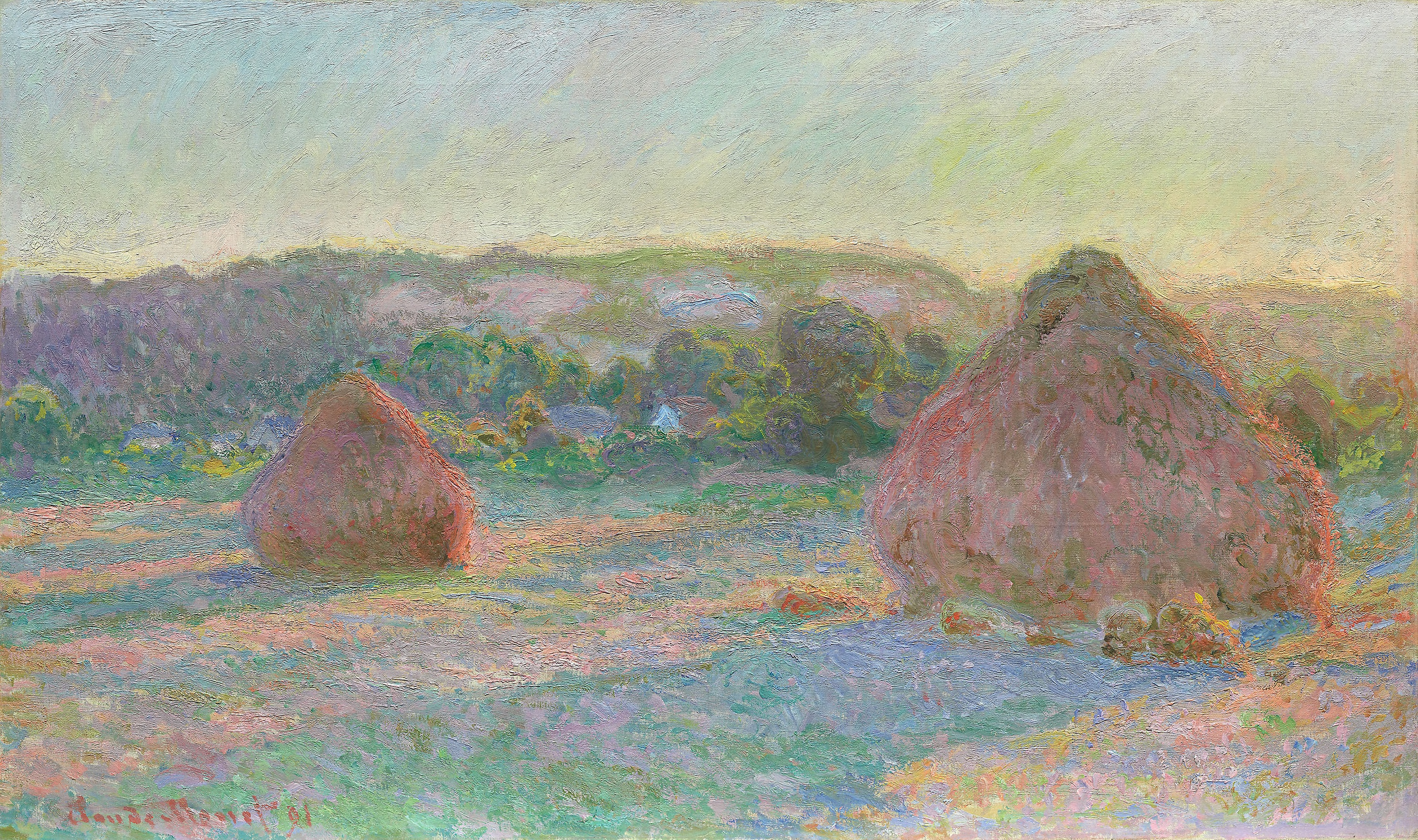
- Artist: Claude Monet
- Year: 1890–91
- Medium: Oil on canvas
- Dimensions: 60 cm × 100 cm (23 5/8 in × 39 3/8 in)
- Location: Art Institute of Chicago, Chicago

Haystacks is the common English title for a series of impressionist paintings by Claude Monet. The principal subject of each painting in the series is stacks of harvested wheat (or possibly barley or oats: the original French title, Les Meules à Giverny, simply means The Stacks at Giverny, obviously concerning stacks of straw). The title refers primarily to a twenty-five canvas series (Wildenstein Index Numbers 1266–1290) which Monet began near the end of the summer of 1890 and continued through the following spring, though Monet also produced five earlier paintings using this same stack subject. A precursor to the series is the 1884 Haystack Near Giverny (Pushkin Museum).

The series is famous for the way in which Monet repeated the same subject to show the differing light and atmosphere at different times of day, across the seasons and in many types of weather.

The series is among Monet's most notable works. The largest Haystacks collections are held at the Musée d'Orsay and Musée Marmottan Monet in Paris, and in the Art Institute of Chicago. The Art Institute of Chicago collection includes six of the twenty-five Haystacks.

Other collections include the Museum of Fine Arts, Boston, the Metropolitan Museum and Museum of Modern Art in New York, the National Museum of Western Art in Tokyo, and the Musée de l'Orangerie in Paris.

Other museums that hold parts of this series include the Getty Center in Los Angeles, the Hill-Stead Museum in Farmington, Connecticut (which also has one of five from the earlier 1888–89 harvest), the Scottish National Gallery, the National Gallery (England), Museum Barberini, Minneapolis Institute of Arts, Kunsthaus Zürich, Tel Aviv Museum of Art and the Shelburne Museum, Vermont. Private collections hold the remaining Haystacks paintings.

== Monet background ==
Monet settled in Giverny in 1883. Most of his paintings from 1883 until his death 40 years later were of scenes within 3 kilometres (2 mi) of his home and gardens. Monet was intensely aware of and fascinated by the visual nuances of the region's landscape and by the endless variations in the days and in the seasons—the stacks were just outside his door.

Monet had previously painted a single subject in different light and different moods. However, as he matured as a painter, his depictions of atmospheric influences were increasingly concerned not only with specific effects but with the overall color harmonies that allowed him an autonomous use of rich color. The conventional wisdom was that the stacks were a simple subject but also an unimaginative one. However, contemporary writers and friends of the artist noted that Monet's subject matter was always carefully chosen, the product of careful thought and analysis. Monet undertook to capture the stacks in direct light and then to re-examine them from the same view-point in different, often more muted, light and atmospheric conditions. It was then not unusual for Monet, in search of harmonious transitions within the series, to alter the canvases back in his studio.

== Series background ==
The stacks depicted in the series are commonly referred to in English as hay, wheat or grain-stacks. In reality they stored sheafs of grain primarily for bread—so wheat [or possibly barley or oats]—and not hay, an animal food. The 10-to-20-foot (3.0 to 6.1 m) stacks were a way of keeping the sheafs dry until the grain could be separated from the stalks by threshing. The local method of storing and drying unthreshed-grains was to use straw, or sometimes hay, as a thatched 'roof' for the stack, shielding the wheat, barley or oats from the elements until, once dry-enough, they could be threshed. The threshing machines then traveled from village to village. Thus, although the grain was harvested and the stacks were built by July, it often took until the following spring or even later—so through all the light and atmosphere changes of summer, autumn, winter and spring—for all the stacks to be reached by the threshing-machines. Grain storage/drying-stacks like these became common throughout Europe in the 19th century and survived until the inception of combine harvesters. The shapes of stacks were regional: in Normandy, where Giverny is situated, it was common for them to be round with quite steeply pitched thatched 'roofs'—just as Monet painted.

The stacks belonged to Monet's farmer-neighbour, Monsieur Quéruel. Noticing the way the light changed on M. Quéruel's stacks, Monet asked his stepdaughter, Blanche Hoschedé, to bring him two canvases, one for sunny and one for overcast conditions. But Monet soon found he could not catch the ever-changing light and mood on merely two canvases: as a result, his willing helper was quickly bringing as many canvases as her wheelbarrow could hold. Monet's daily routine therefore came to involve carting paints, easels and many unfinished canvases back and forth, working on whichever canvas most closely resembled the scene of the moment as the conditions and light fluctuated. Although he began painting the stacks en plein air, Monet later revised his initial impressions in his studio, both to generate contrast and to preserve the harmony within the series.

Monet produced numerous Haystacks paintings. He painted five paintings (Wildenstein Index Numbers 1213–1217) with stacks as his primary subject during the 1888 harvest. His earlier landscapes (Wildenstein Index Number 900–995, 1073) had included stacks [and also some more-accurately described hayricks: that is smaller piles of hay for animal-feed] in an ancillary manner. The general consensus is that only the canvases produced using the 1890 harvest (Wildenstein Index Number 1266–1290) comprise the Haystacks series proper. However some commentators include additional paintings when referencing this series. For example, the Hill-Stead Museum talk of their two stack paintings even though one is from the 'proper' 1890 harvest, the other from the 1888 harvest.

Monet's Haystacks series is one of his earliest to rely on repetition to illustrate nuances in his perception across natural variations such as times of day, seasons, and types of weather. For Monet, the concept of producing and exhibiting a series of paintings related by subject and vantage point began in 1889, with at least ten paintings done at the Valley of the Creuse, and subsequently shown at the Galerie Georges Petit. This interest in the serial motif would continue for the rest of his career.

== Thematic issues ==
Although the mundane subject was constant throughout the Haystack series, the underlying theme may be seen as the transience of light. This concept enabled Monet to use repetition to show nuances of perception as the time of day, the seasons and the weather changed. The almost unvarying subject provided the basis for him to compare changes of light and mood across his nuanced series. The first paintings in the series were started in late September or early October 1890, and he continued producing these paintings for about seven months. These paintings made Monet the first painter to paint such a large quantity of pictures of the same subject matter differentiated by light, weather, atmosphere and perspective.

Beginning in the 1880s and 1890s, Monet focused on Haystacks and a number of other subjects (other series included the Mornings on the Seine, Poplars, Rouen Cathedral, the Houses of Parliament, and the Water Lilies, among others). In order to work on many paintings virtually simultaneously, he would awake before dawn so as to begin at the earliest time of day:

... for the Early Mornings on the Seine series, he chose to paint at and before dawn, which made it 'an easier subject and simpler lighting than usual', because at this time of day the effects did not change so rapidly; however, this involved him getting up at 3:30 a.m., which seems to have been unprecedented even for so inveterate an early riser as Monet."

As the morning progressed and the light changed he would switch to sequentially later canvas settings, sometimes working on as many as ten or twelve paintings a day, each one depicting a slightly different aspect of light. The process would be repeated over the course of days, weeks, or months, depending on the weather and the progress of the paintings until they were completed. As the seasons changed the process was renewed.

Certain effects of light only last for a few minutes, thus the canvases documenting such ephemera received attention for no more than a few minutes a day. Further complicating matters, the light of subsequent sunrises, for example, could alter substantially and would require separate canvases within the series. Subsequently, different hues are evident in each painting, and in each work, color is used to describe not only direct but reflected light. At differing times of day and in various seasons stacks absorb the light from diverse parts of the color spectrum. As a result, the residual light that is reflected off of the stacks is seen as ever-changing, and manifests in distinctive coloring.

Many notable painters have been influenced by this particular series, including Les Fauves, Derain, and Vlaminck. Kandinsky's memoirs refer to the series: "What suddenly became clear to me was the unsuspected power of the palette, which I had not understood before and which surpassed my wildest dreams."

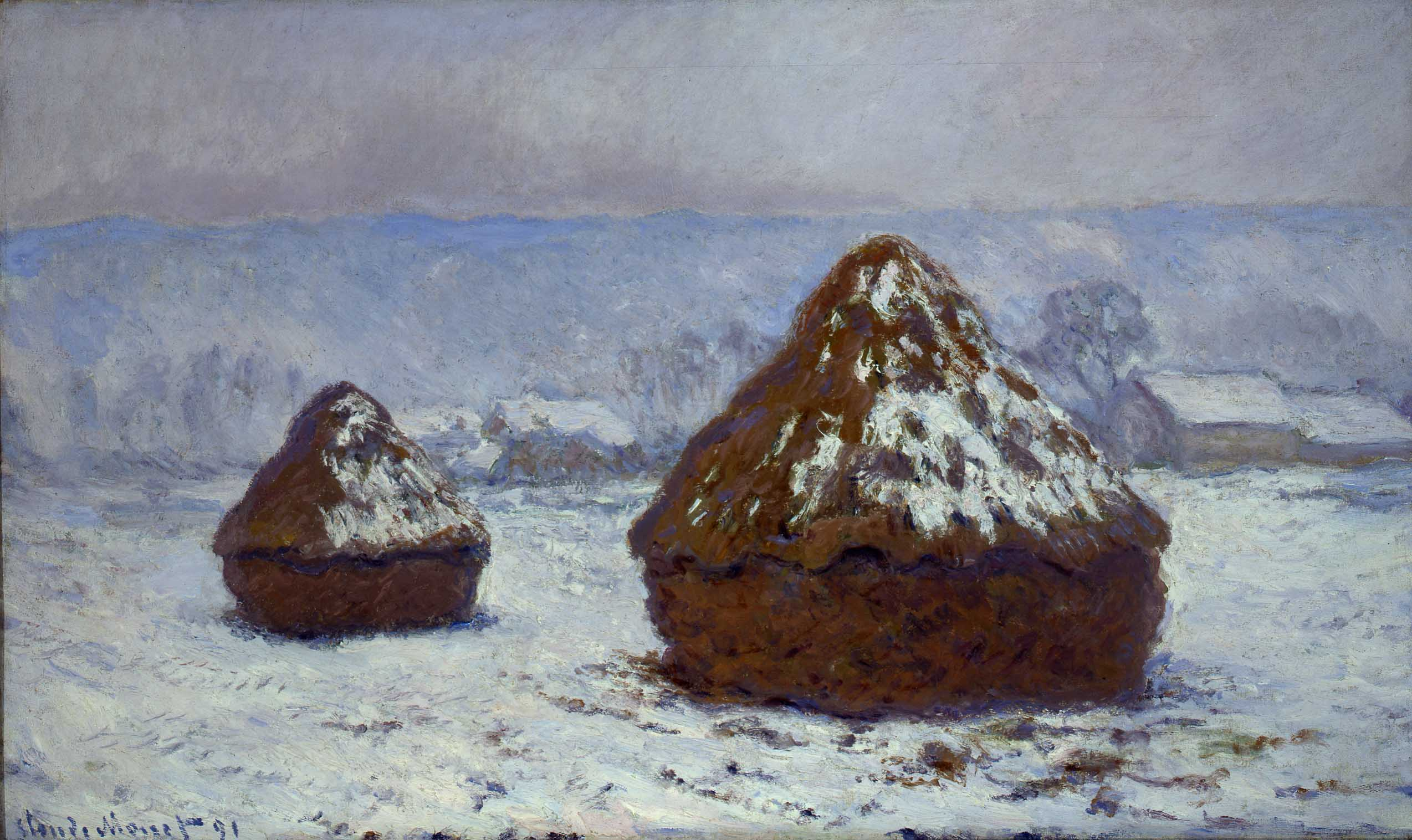
Grainstacks, Snow Effect, 1891, Shelburne Museum, Vermont, USA.

The Haystacks series was a financial success. Fifteen of these were exhibited by Durand-Ruel in May 1891, and most of the paintings were sold within a month. They were especially popular among collectors from America, with twenty out of the thirty Haystacks created landing in American collections. Of the American collectors, Bertha Honoré Palmer bought nine of Monet's Haystacks. The 1891 exhibit met with great public acclaim. Octave Mirbeau described Monet's daring series as representing "what lies beyond progress itself." Others described the stacks as "faces of the landscape"—they represented the countryside as a retreat from daily problems and home for contentment with nature. Camille Pissarro said: "These canvases breathe contentment." Most of the paintings sold immediately for as much as 1,000 francs. Additionally, Monet's prices, in general, began to rise steeply. As a result, he was able to buy outright the house and grounds at Giverny and to start constructing a waterlily pond. After years of mere subsistence living, he was able to enjoy success.

The series demonstrates his intense study of light and atmospheric conditions and Monet was a perfectionist in his renderings. Monet destroyed more than one series of paintings that he found wanting. However, this series escaped his own harsh self-criticism and destruction.

== 1888–1889 paintings ==
From the 1888 harvest, Monet produced three canvases featuring two stacks each (Wildenstein #'s 1213–5) against the backdrop of hills along the left bank of the Seine and a few Giverny houses to the right. Then, he turned to his left to capture two scenes (1216–7) in which the hills are shrouded by a line of poplars.

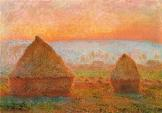
Grainstacks at Giverny, sunset, 1888–89. Oil on canvas.

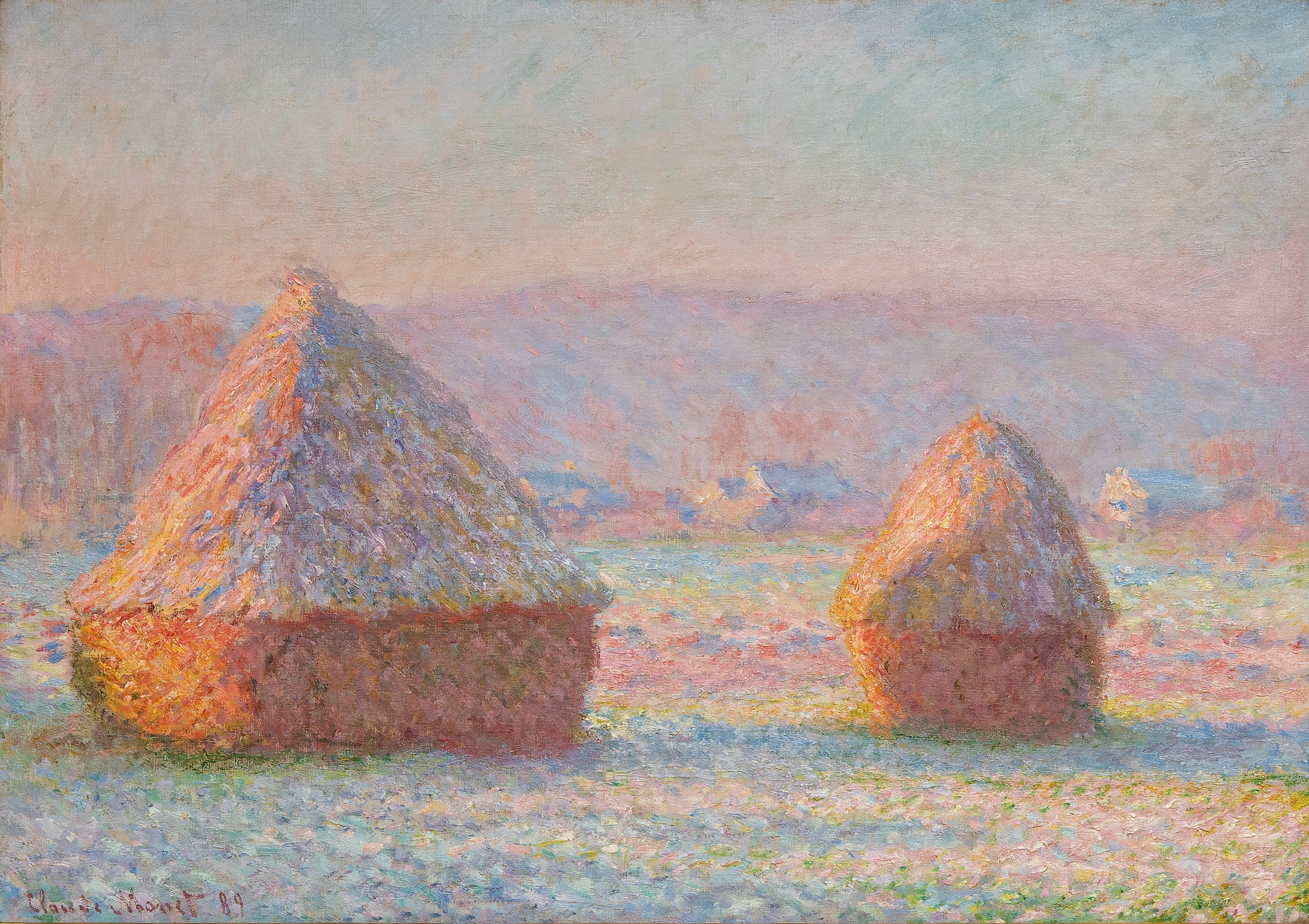
Grainstacks, White Frost Effect, 1889. Oil on canvas. Hill-Stead Museum, Farmington, CT.

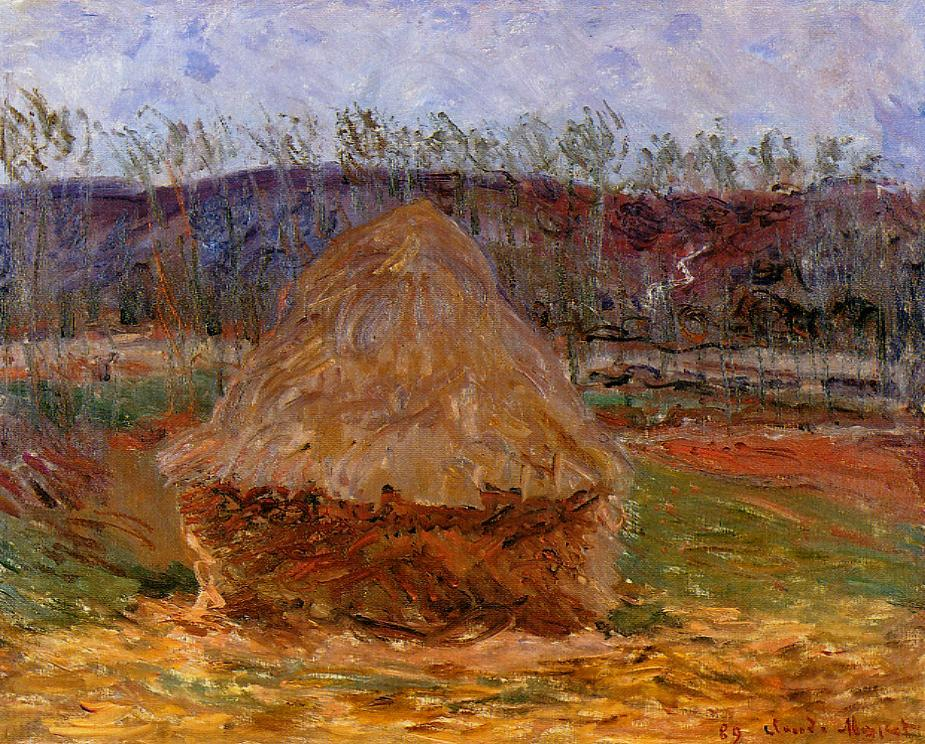
Grainstack at Giverny, 1888–89. Oil on canvas. Tel Aviv Museum of Art.

== 1890–1891 series ==
On May 14, 2019, a privately held work from this series (Grainstacks, 1890) exchanged hands at $110.7 million, setting a record for a Monet work and becoming the first impressionist work to surpass $100 million. The buyer of the work was Hasso Plattner. Since September 2020, the painting is on display at the Museum Barberini in Potsdam.

Climate activists threw mashed potatoes at the painting in October 2022, but it was not damaged and was cleaned and put back on display.

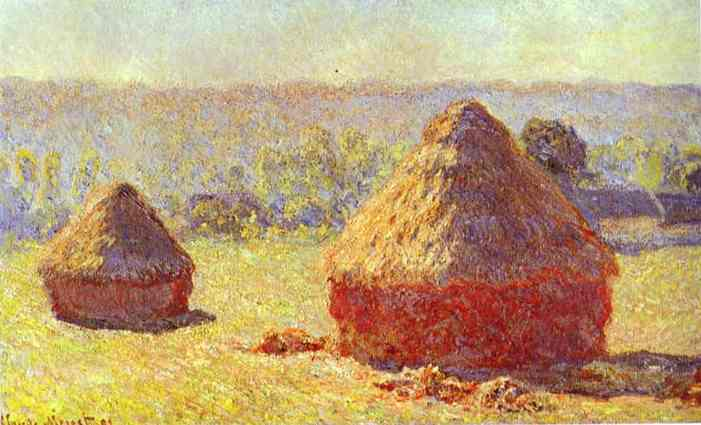
Stacks, End of Summer, (Meules, fin de l'été), 1891. Oil on canvas. Musée d'Orsay, Paris, France. W1266

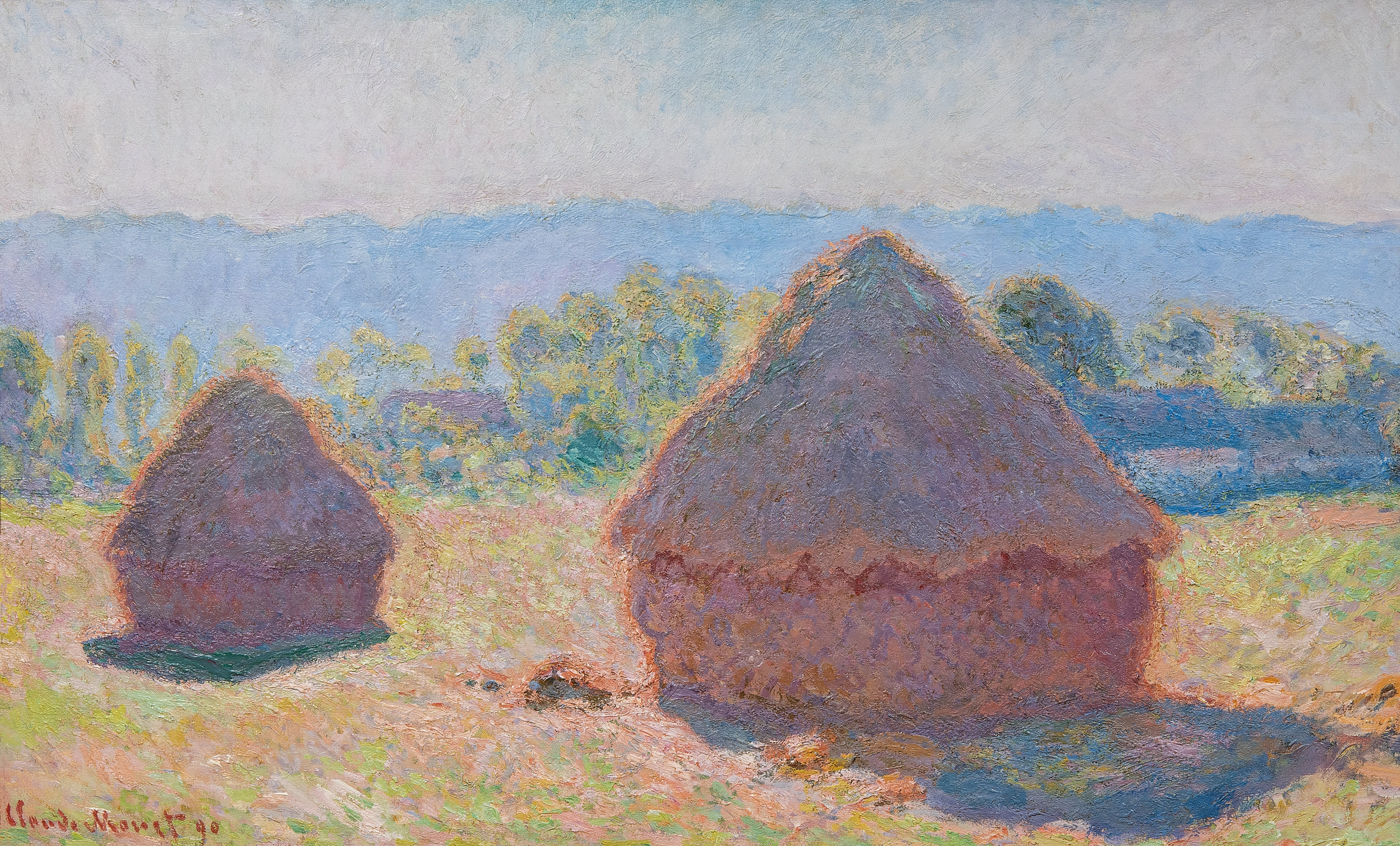
Grainstacks, in Bright Sunlight, 1890, Hill-Stead Museum, Farmington, CT, W1267

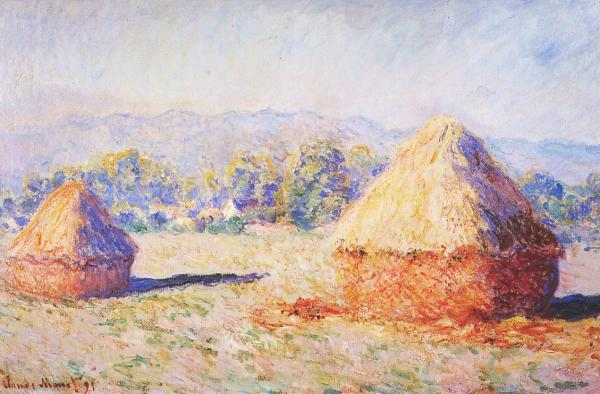
Grainstacks in the Sunlight, Morning Effect, 1890. Oil on canvas. Private collection. W1268.

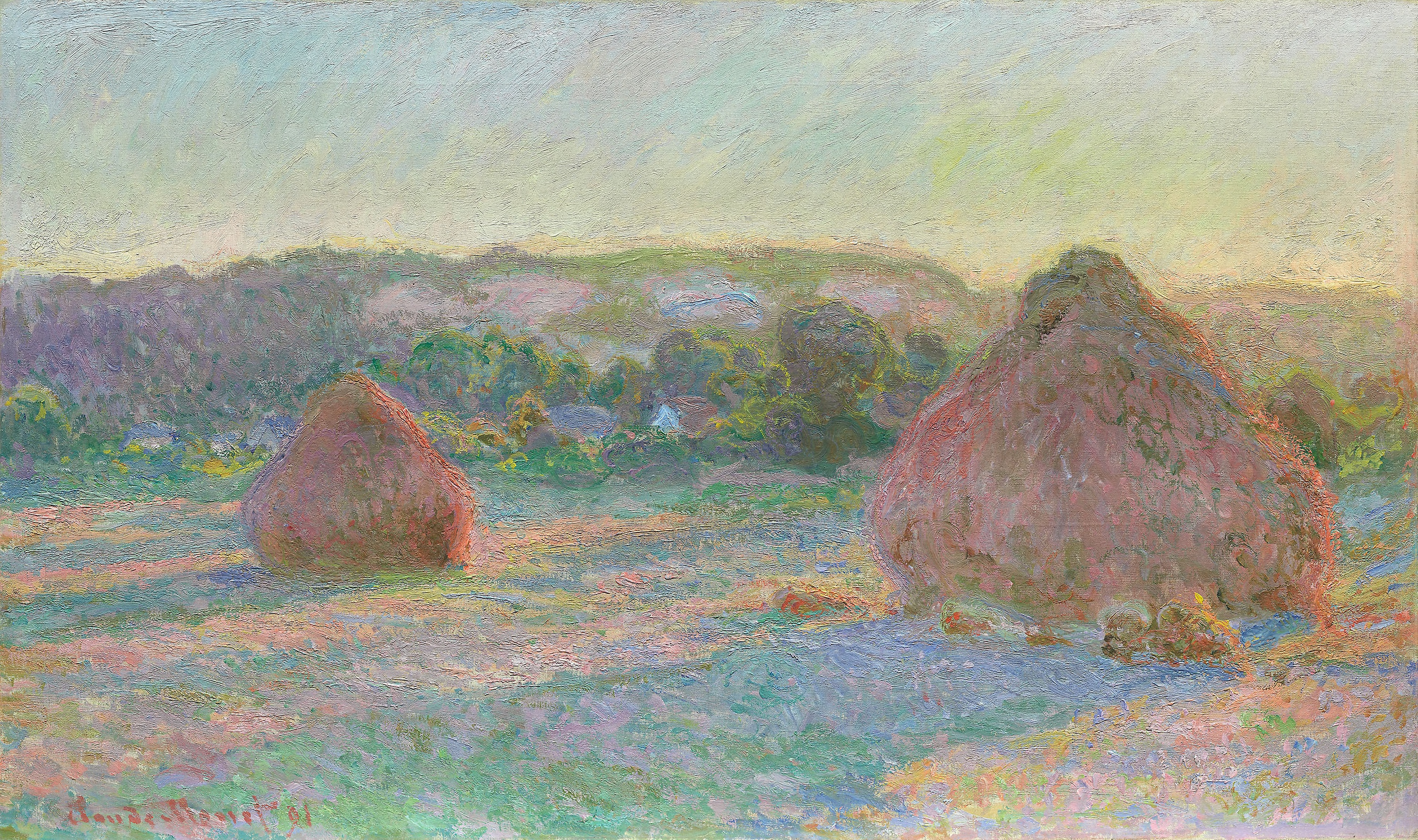
Wheatstacks (End of Summer), 1890–91. Oil on canvas. Art Institute of Chicago, W1269

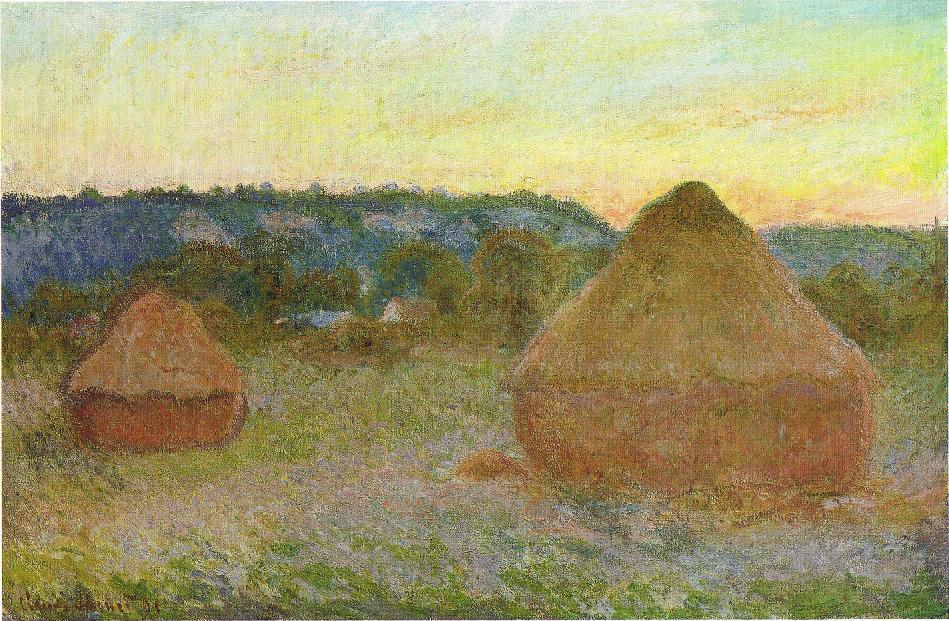
Wheatstacks, 1890–91. Oil on canvas. Art Institute of Chicago. W1270

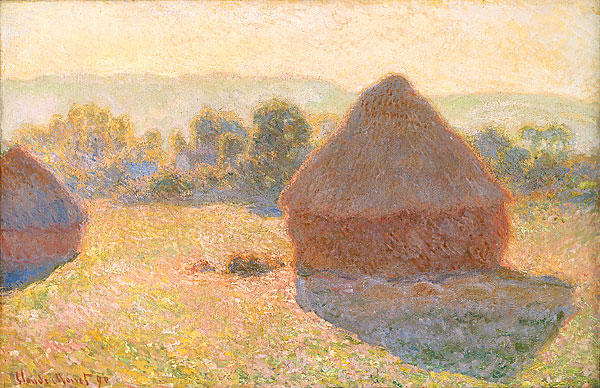
Haystacks, (Midday), 1890–91, National Gallery of Australia, W1271

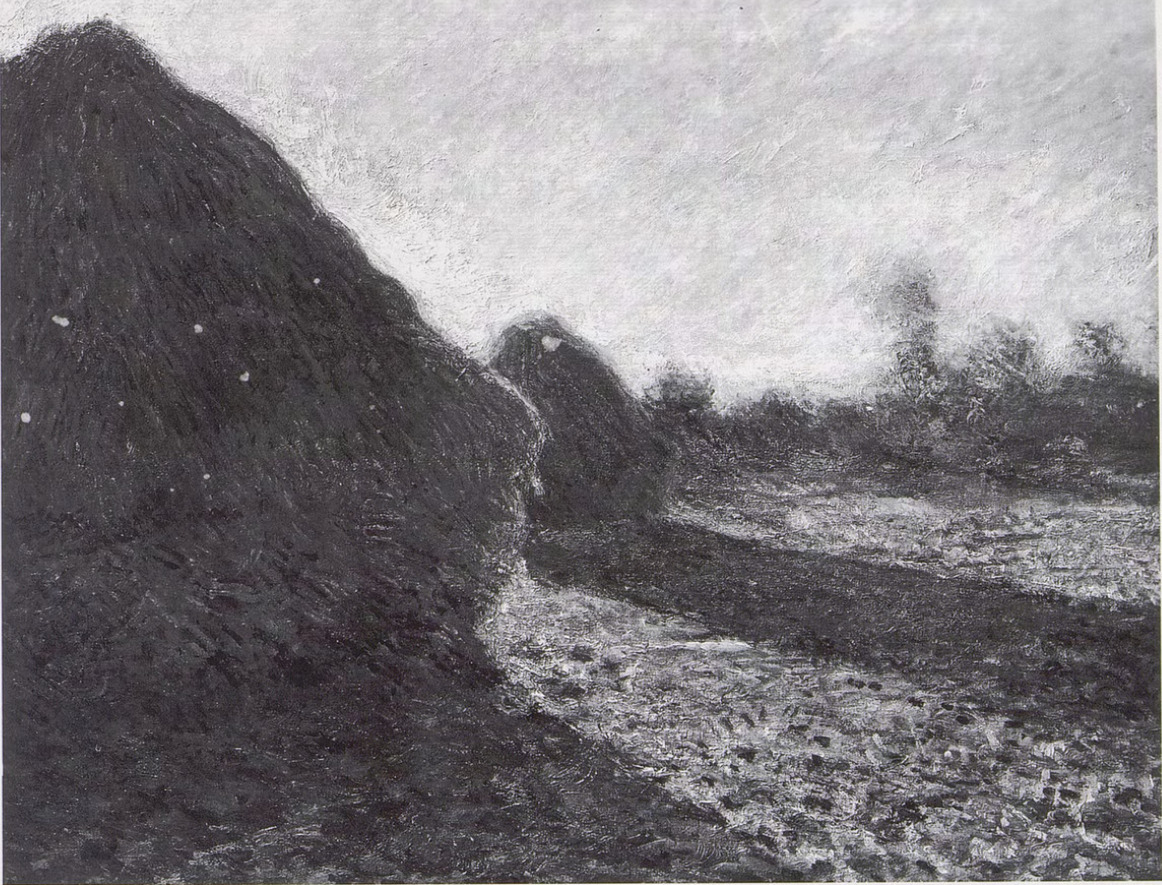
Monet – Wildenstein 1996, 1272.

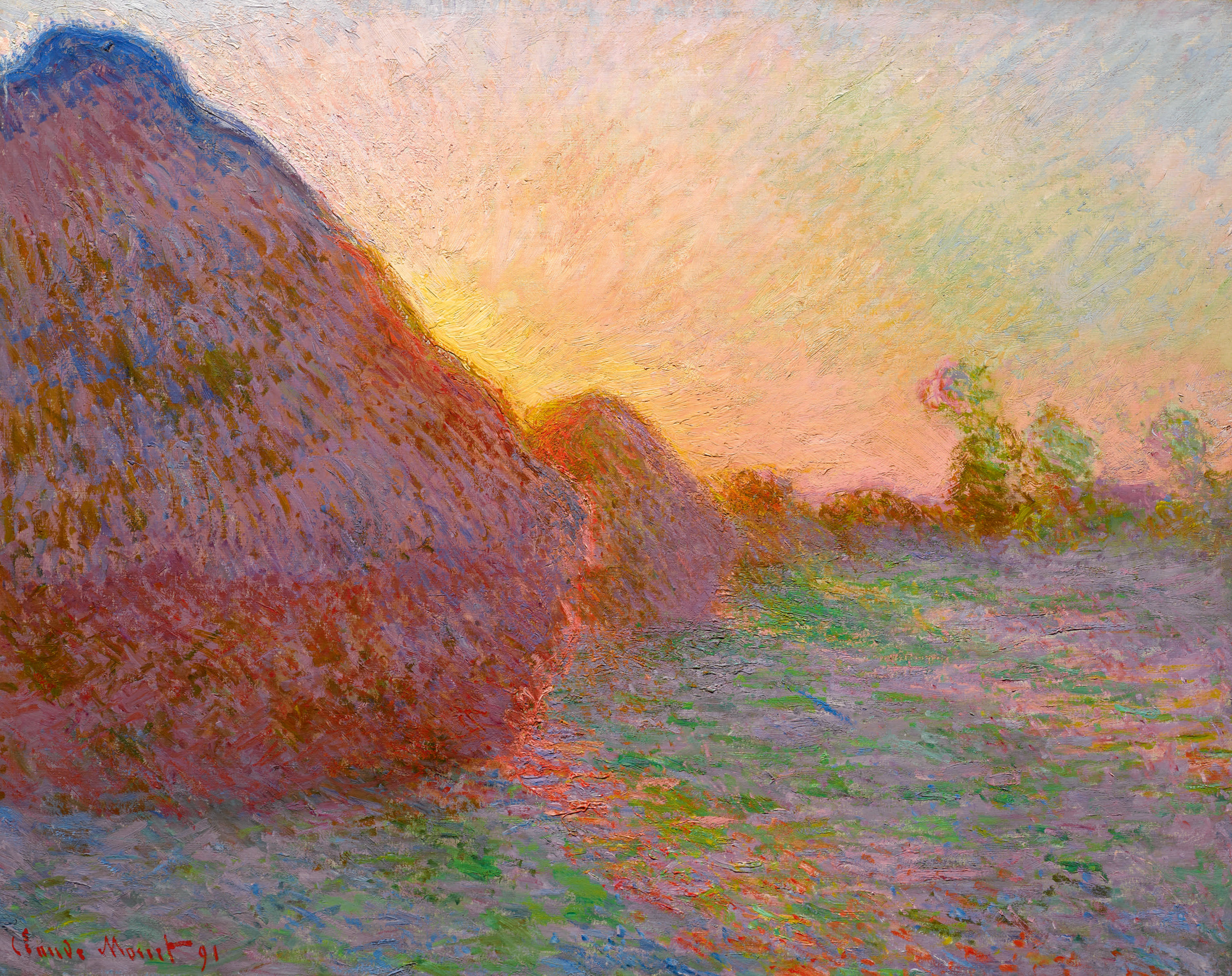
Grainstacks, 1890. Oil on canvas. Hasso Plattner Collection, on permanent loan at the Museum Barberini, Potsdam (Sold for $110.7 million on Sotheby's May 14, 2019.) W1273

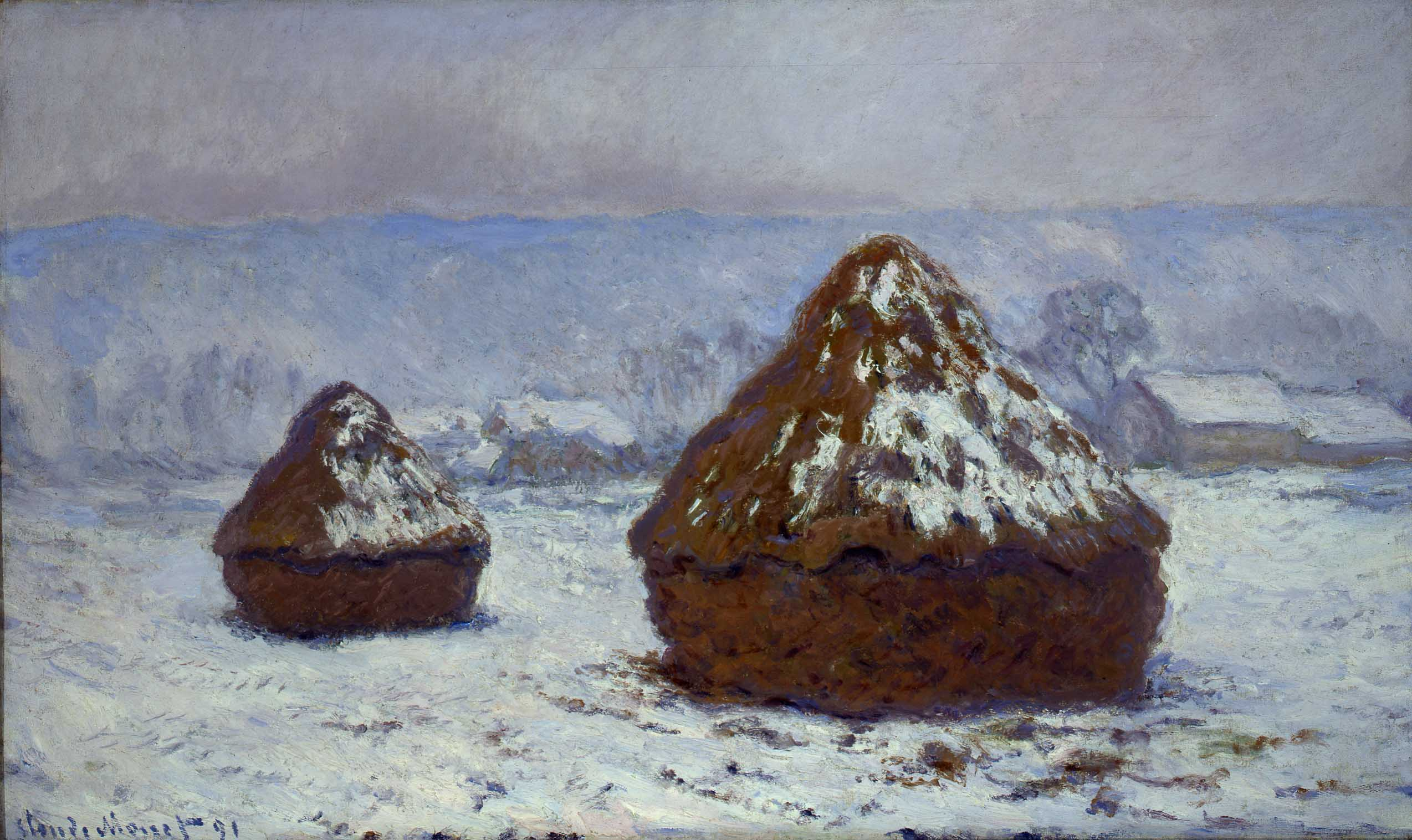
Grainstacks, Snow Effect, 1891, Shelburne Museum, Vermont

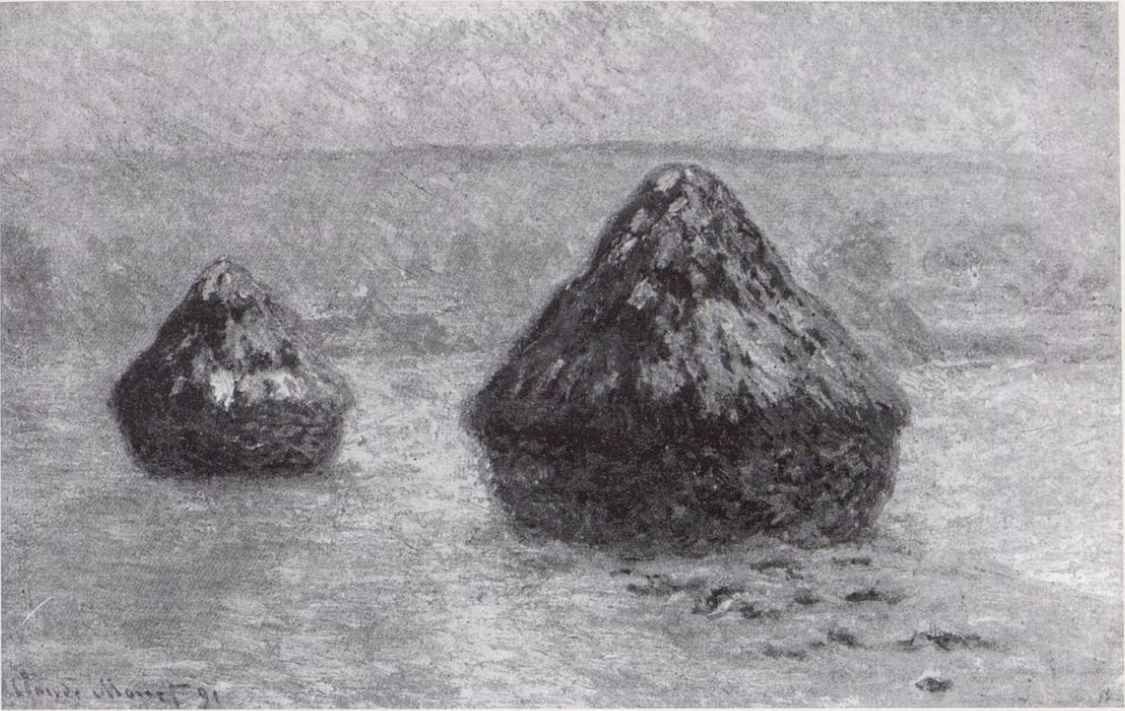
Monet – Wildenstein 1996, 1275.

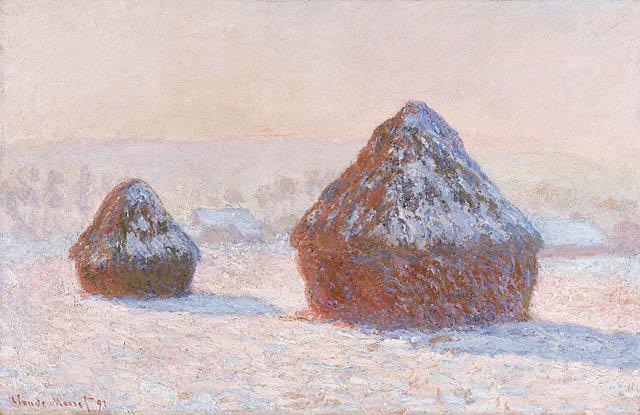
Wheatstacks, Snow Effect, Morning, 1891. Oil on canvas. J. Paul Getty Museum. W1276.

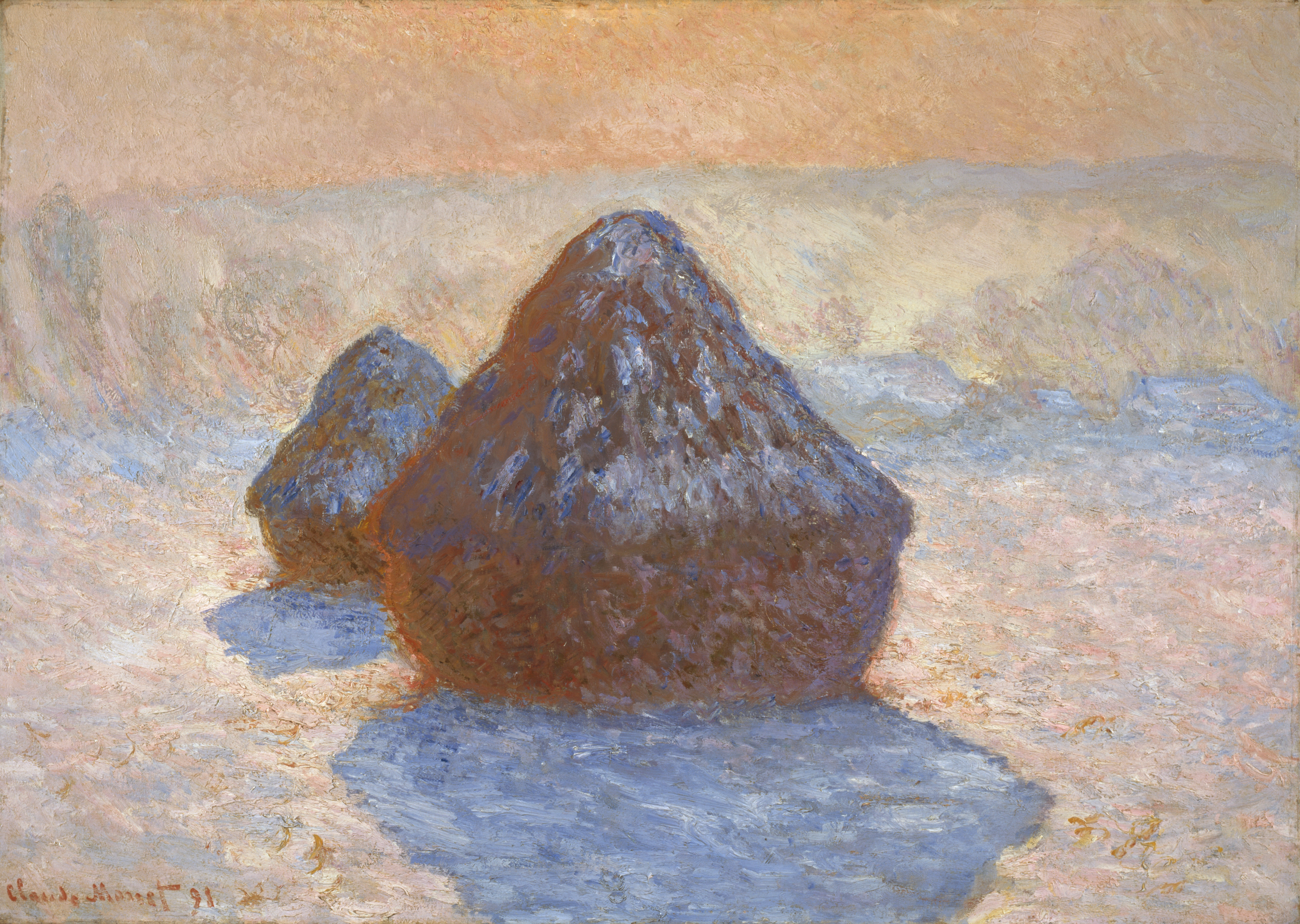
Grainstacks Snow Effect, (Meules, effet de neige), 1891. Oil on canvas. Scottish National Gallery, Edinburgh, Scotland, W1277

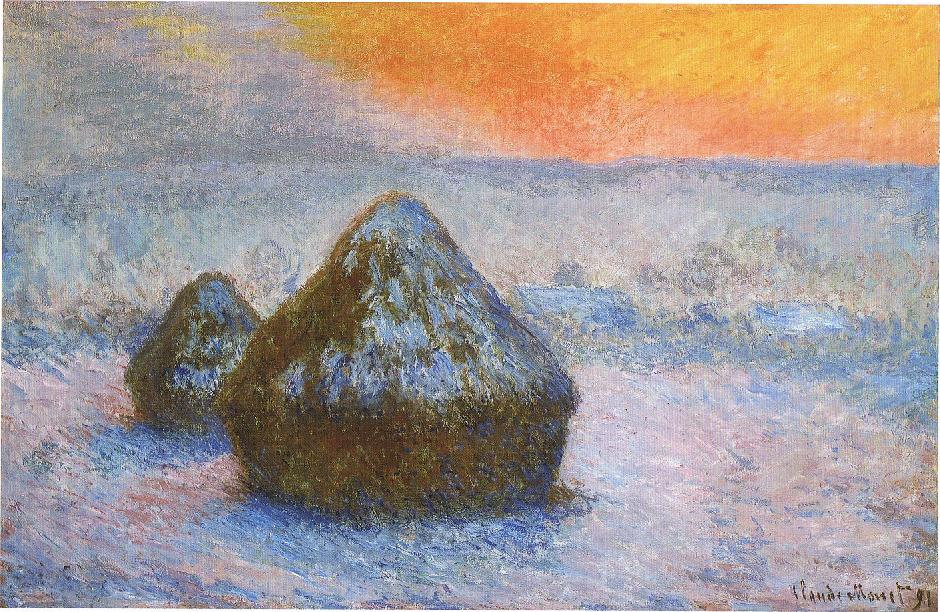
Wheatstacks (Sunset, Snow Effect), 1890–91. Oil on canvas. Art Institute of Chicago. W1278

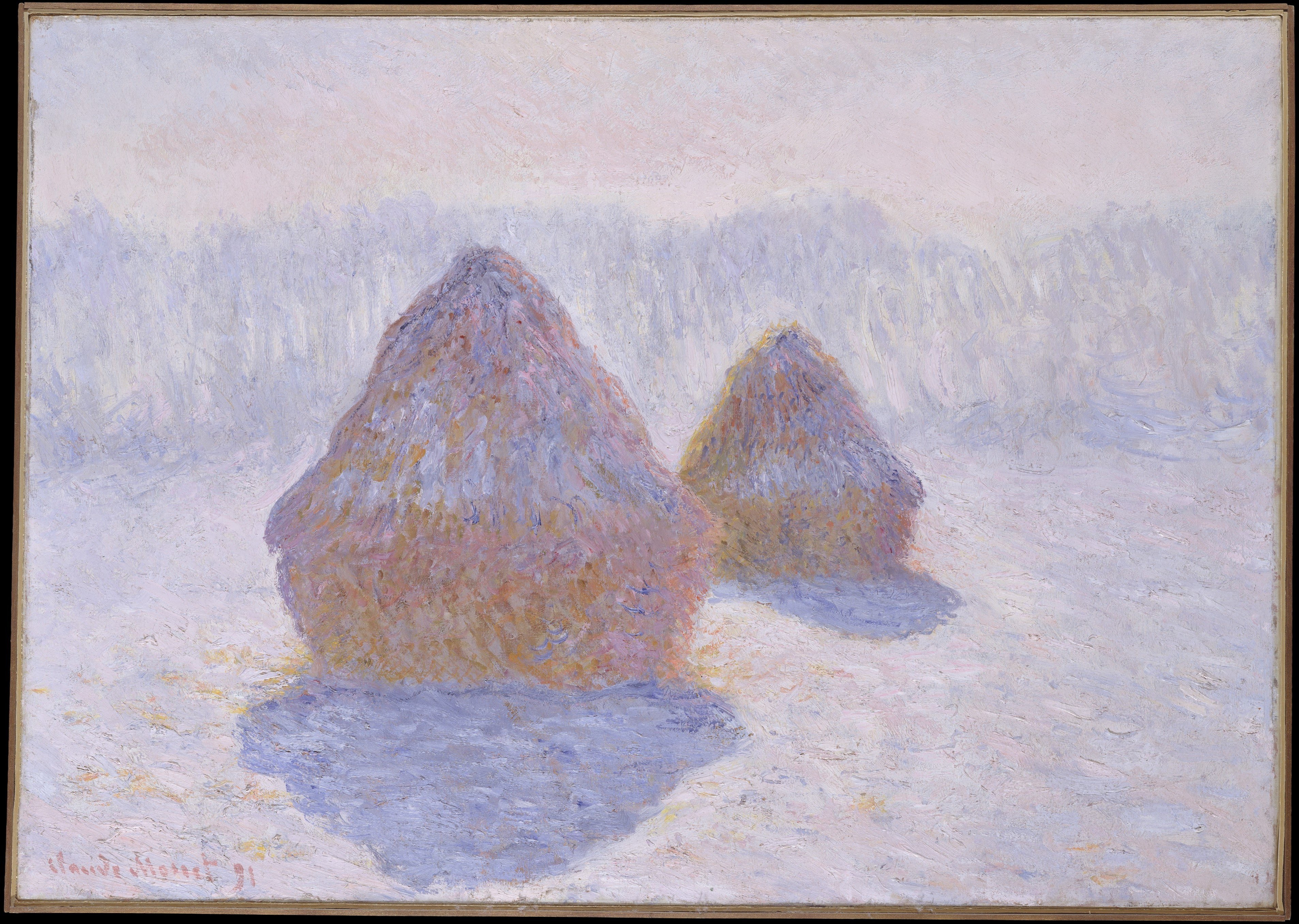
Haystacks (Effect of Snow and Sun) Oil on canvas. Metropolitan Museum of Art – W1279

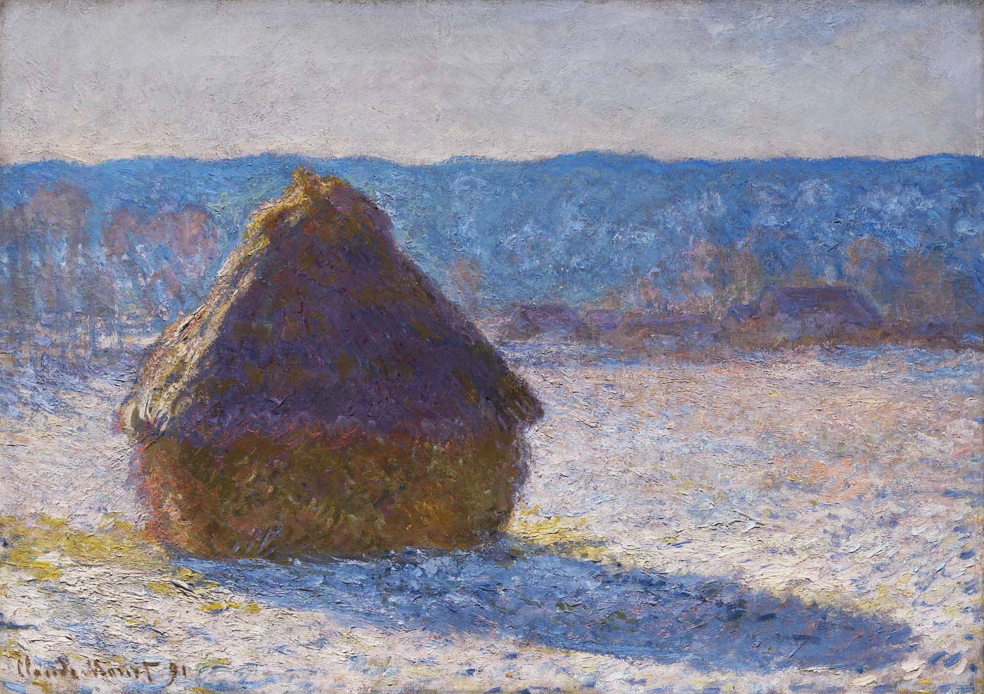
Haystack, Morning Snow Effect (Meule, Effet de Neige, le Matin), 1891. Oil on canvas. Museum of Fine Arts, Boston.W1280

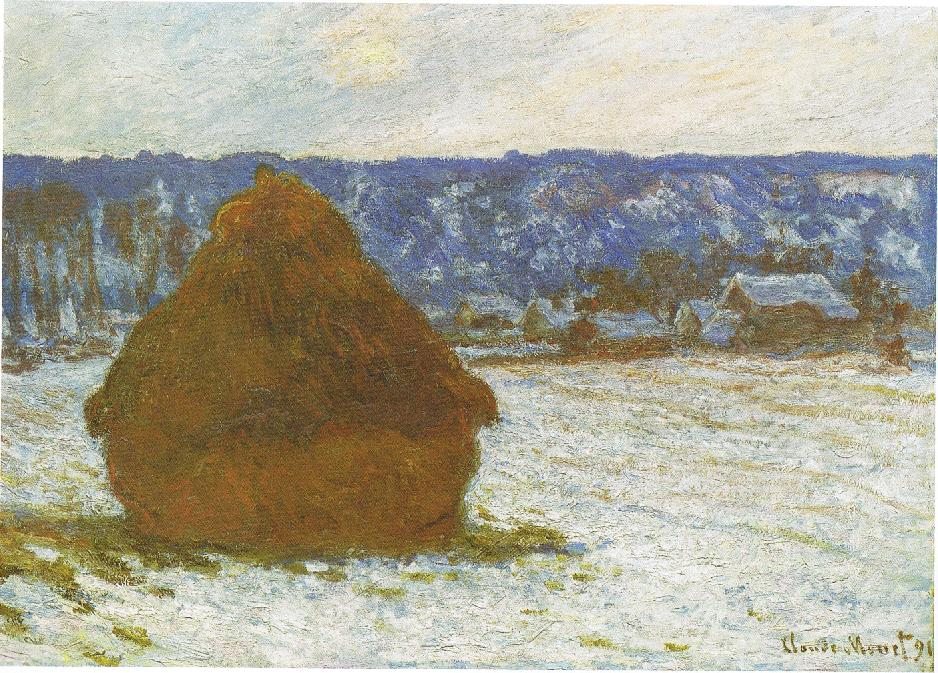
Wheatstack (Snow Effect, Overcast day), 1890–91. Oil on canvas. Art Institute of Chicago. W1281

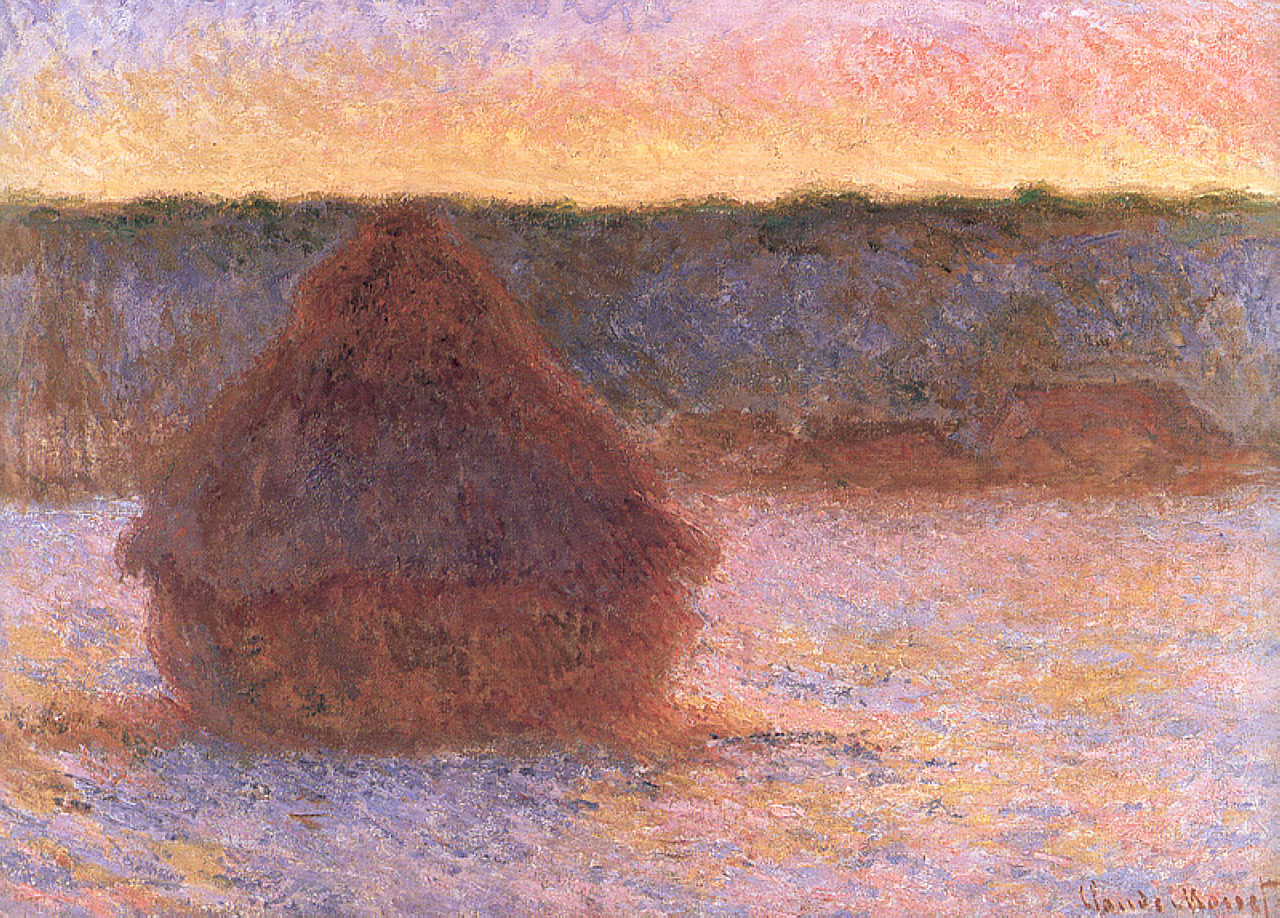
Grainstack (Sunset, Winter), 1890. Oil on canvas. Private Collection on long term loan at the National Gallery. W1282

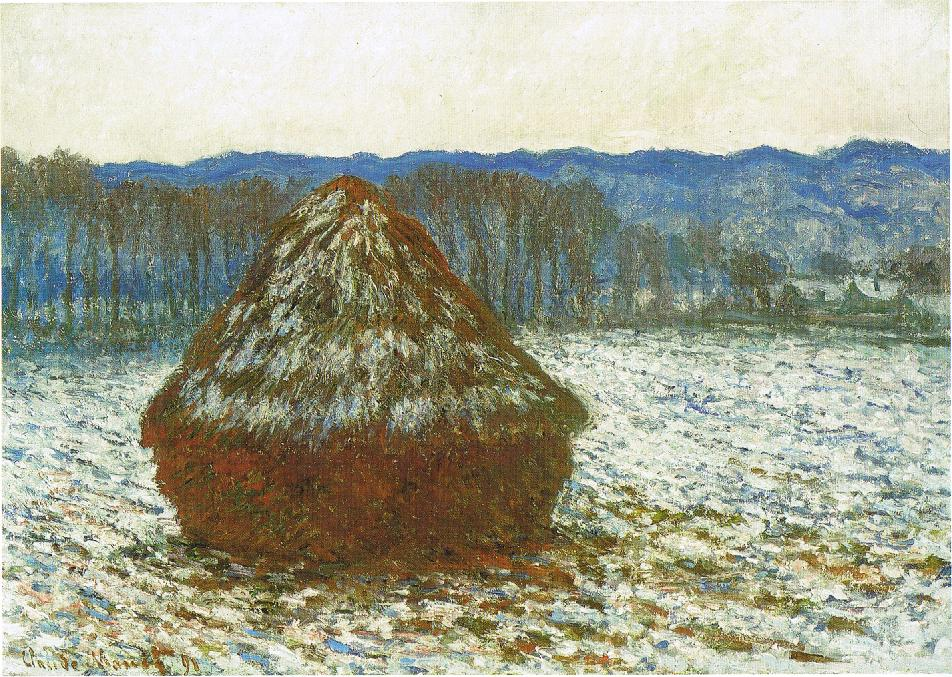
Wheatstack, 1890–91. Oil on canvas. Art Institute of Chicago. W1283

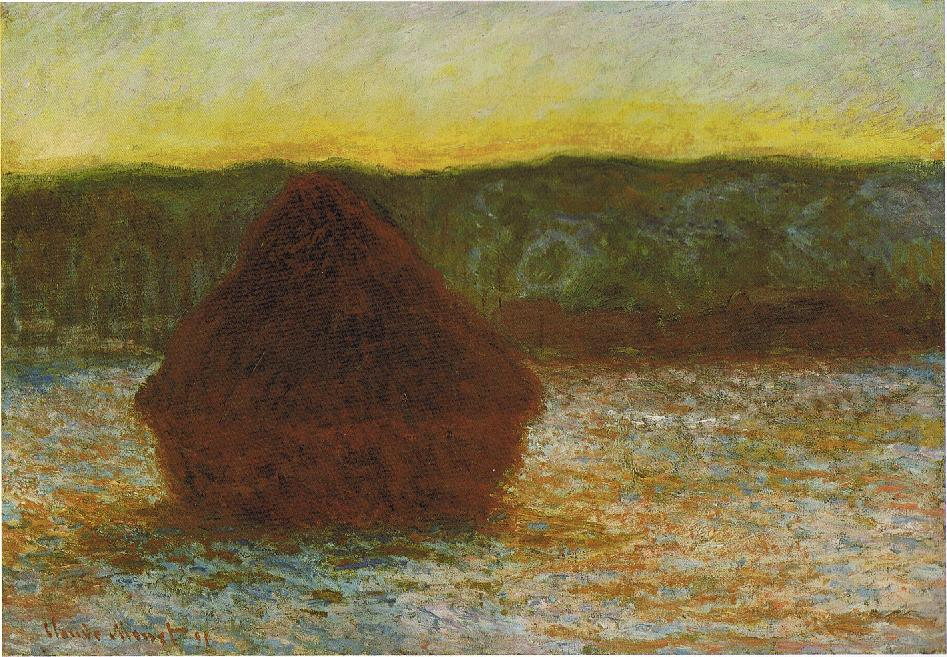
Wheatstack (Thaw, Sunset), 1890–91. Oil on canvas. Art Institute of Chicago. W1284

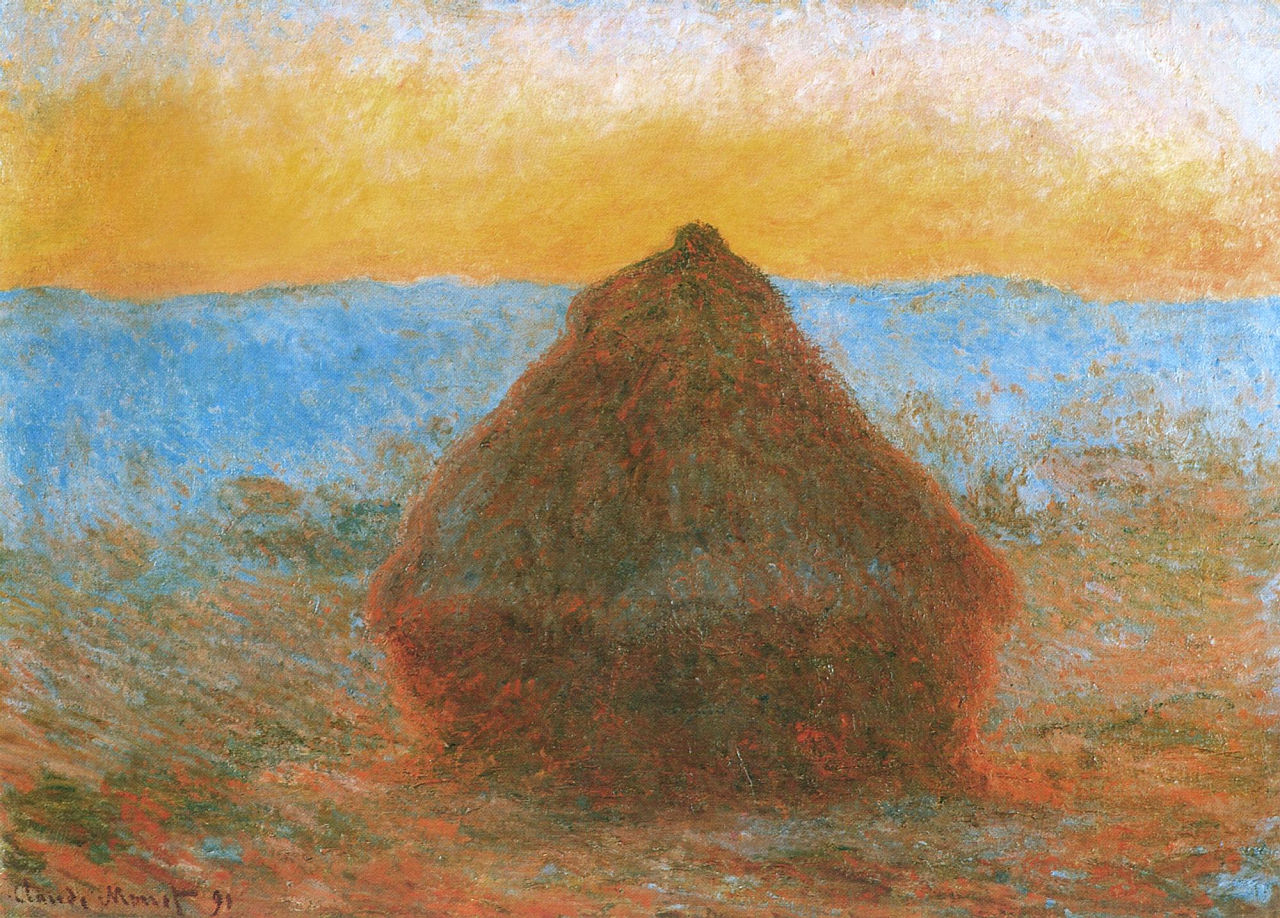
Monet grainstack 65 x 92 cm, 1891 W1285

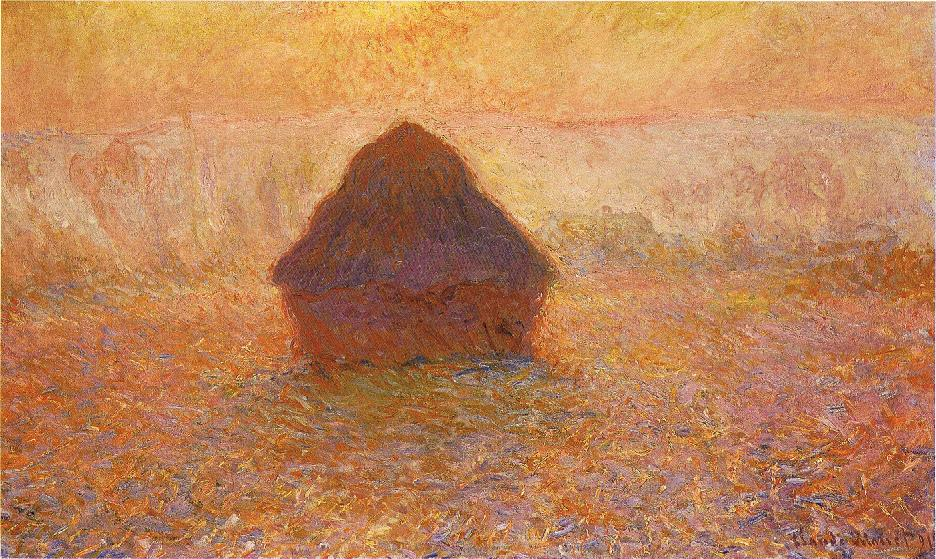
Wheatstack (Sun in the Mist), 1891. Oil on canvas. Minneapolis Institute of Arts. W1286

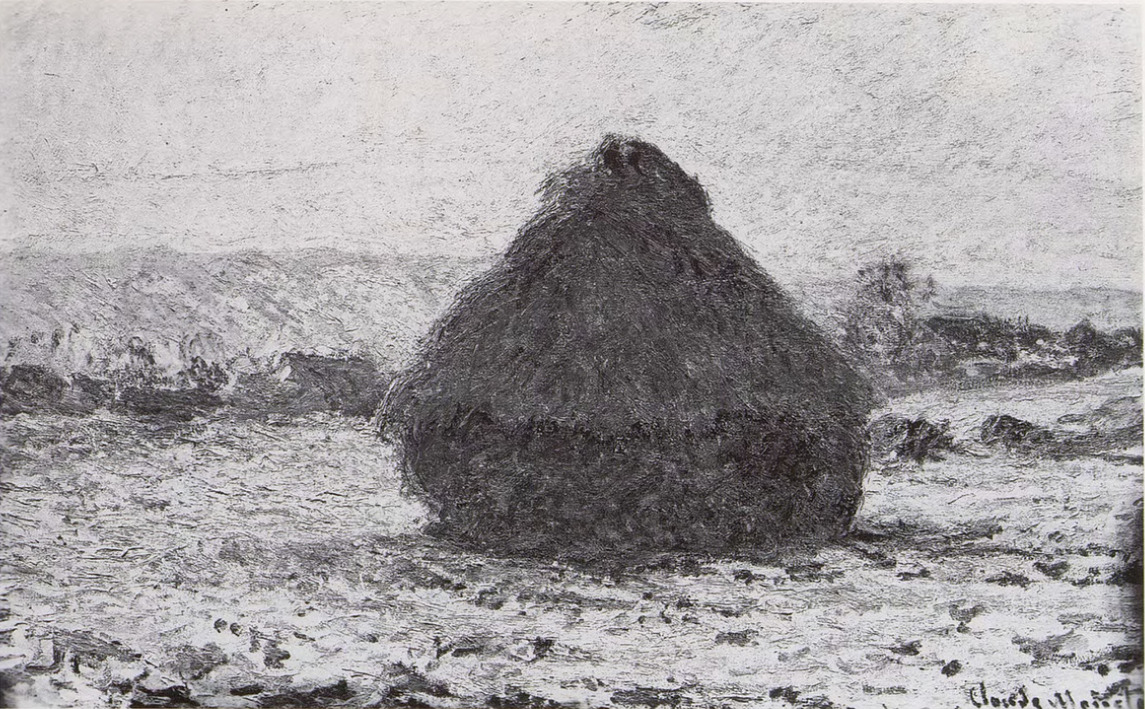
Grainstack in the Sunlight, Snow Effect, 1891, Hasso Plattner Collection, on permanent loan at the Museum Barberini in Potsdam. W1287

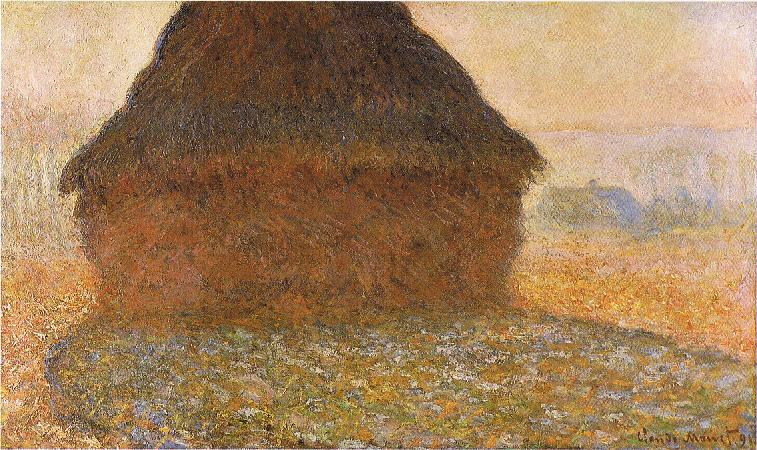
Grainstack in Sunshine, 1891. Oil on canvas. Kunsthaus Zürich. W1288

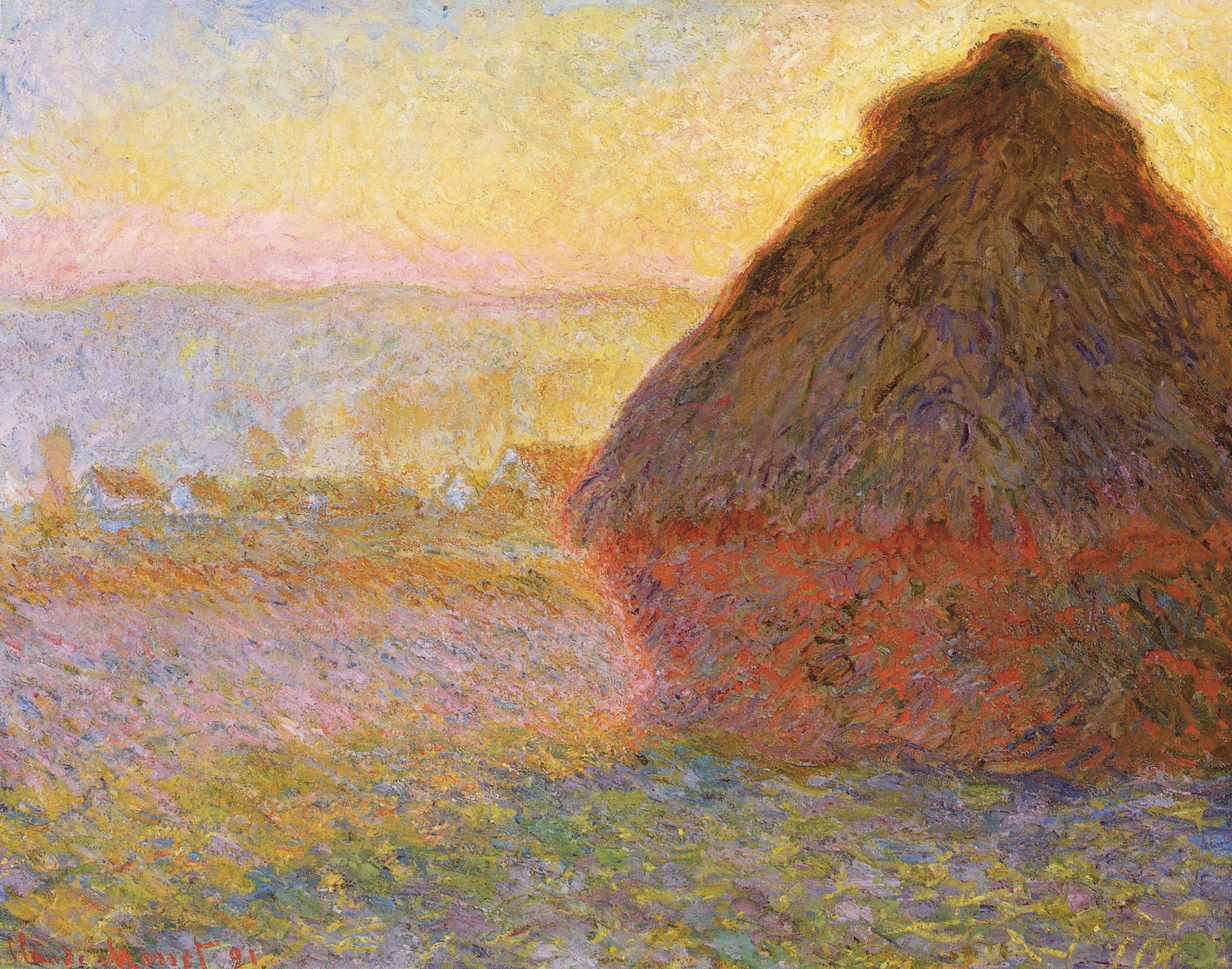
Grainstack. (Sunset.), 1890–91. Oil on canvas. Museum of Fine Arts, Boston. W1289

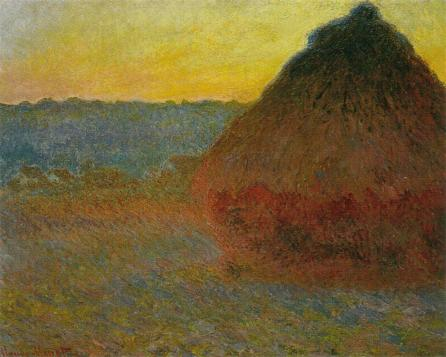
Grainstack in the Sunlight, 1891. Oil on canvas. Private collection. W1290

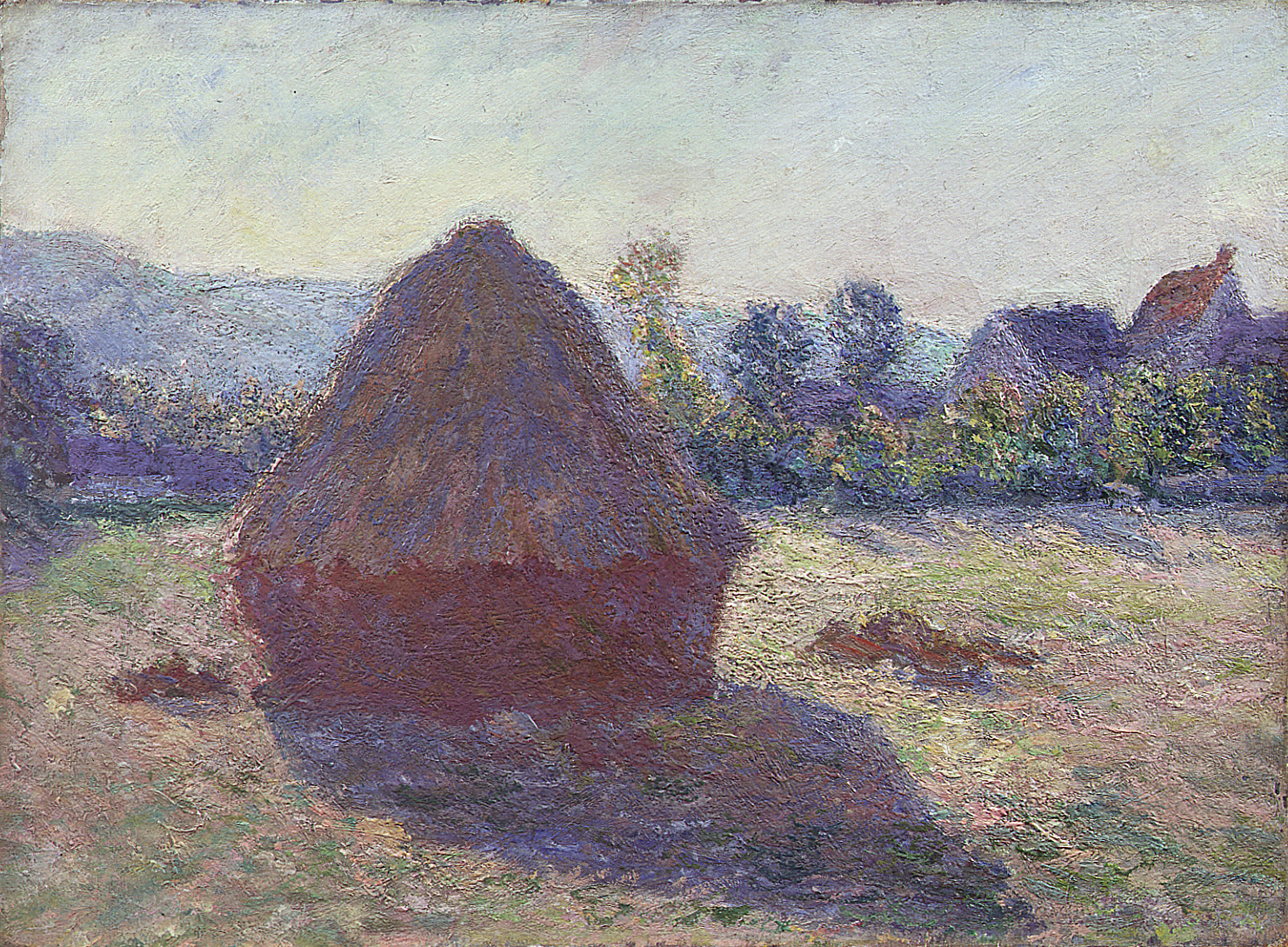
Haystack in the Evening Sun, 1891. Oil on canvas. Gösta Serlachius Fine Arts Foundation.

== See also ==
- List of paintings by Claude Monet
