= Haystack Near Giverny =

Painting by Claude Monet

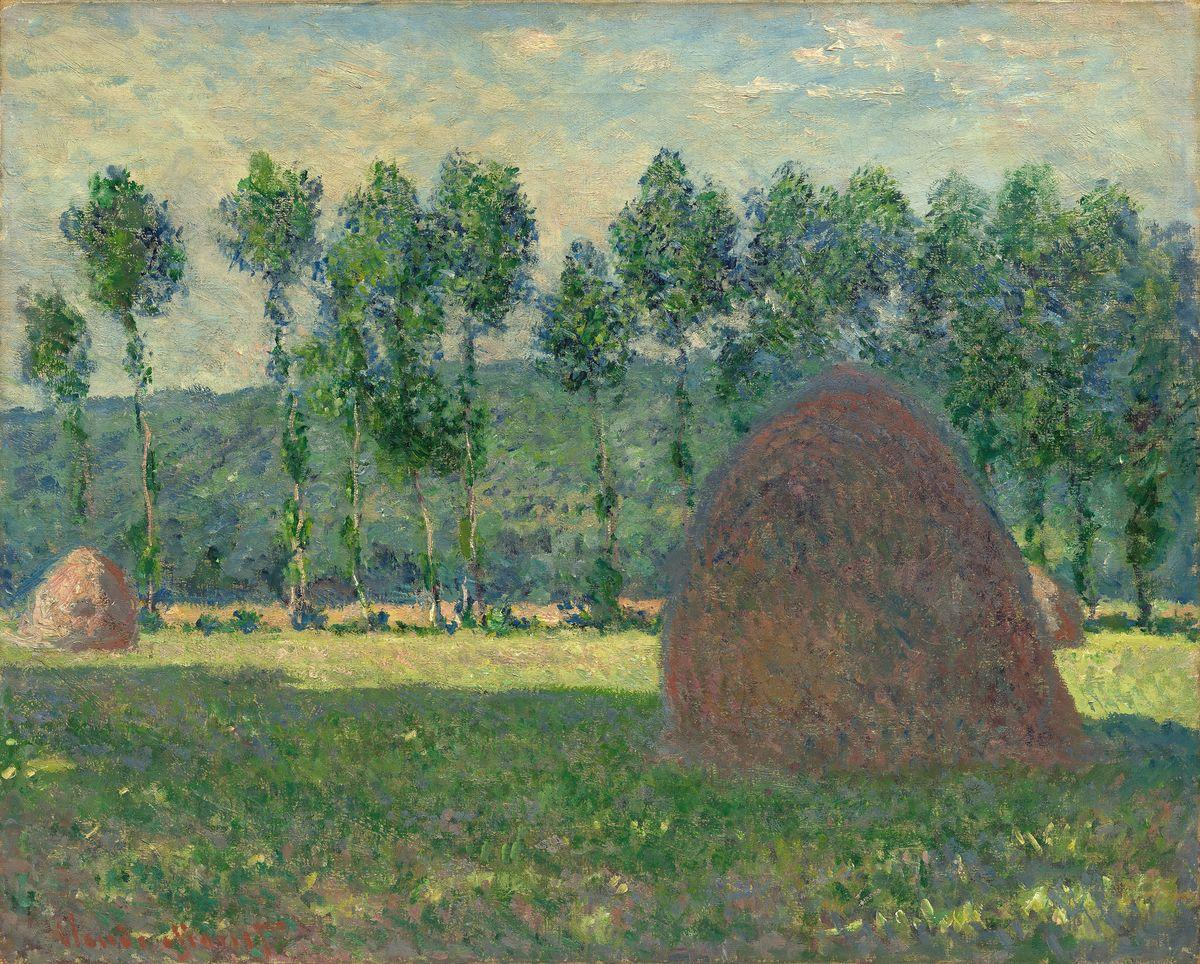
Haystack Near Giverny (1884) by Claude Monet

Haystack Near Giverny is an oil on canvas painting by Claude Monet, from 1884. It is held in the Pushkin Museum, in Moscow. It is a precursor to his 1890s Haystacks series.

It was bought by Paul Durand-Ruel in 1906 and in spring 1907 he sold it on to Ivan Morozov. A letter from Durand-Ruel on 27 May 1907 confirms he received 10,000 francs from Morozov for that work and 40,000 francs for A Corner in the Garden at Montgeron - the former arrived in Moscow on 10 October that year. His collection was seized by the state after the October Revolution - the painting was assigned to the State Museum of Modern Western Art until its closure in 1948, then moved to its present location.

== See also ==
- List of paintings by Claude Monet
