= Monet: The Mystery of the Orangery =

2000 video game

- Developers: index+ Media Factory
- Publisher: Wanadoo Edition
- Platform: Microsoft Windows
- Release: WW: 2000
- Genres: Adventure game, edutainment
- Mode: Single player

Monet: The Mystery of the Orangery (French: Monet: Le Mystère de l'Orangerie) is a 2000 educational adventure game developed by index+ and Media Factory, and published by Wanadoo Edition on Windows. The title and the game reference the Musée de l'Orangerie in Paris, France, where eight large Water Lilly paintings by Claude Monet are exhibited.

== Plot and gameplay ==
The player has been tasked by the French government to restore the Orangery, however a wealthy oil-banker proves to the game's antagonist as they put profits over art.

The gameplay sees the player interacting with characters, traveling to locations (including Monet's paintings rendered in 3D), and locating clues.

== Development ==
It is difficult to play the game on modern hardware.

== Critical reception ==
Four Fat Chicks praised it as a "surprisingly unpretentious little game". Adventure Archiv felt the game was enjoyable family-friendly fare despite its brevity. Rock Paper Shotgun noted, upon reviewing 2016's IMPRESSIONISTa, that the concept of stepping into a Monet painting had already been done with this title. Similarly, Metzomagic noted Monet had explored the concept before Mission Sunlight.
