= Mission Sunlight =

1998 video game

- Release: 1998
- Genre(s): Educational, adventure

Mission Sunlight is a 1998 educational adventure game developed by Media Factory and published by index+.

== Critical reception ==
Adventure Archiv negatively compared it to the 2000 adventure game Monet: The Mystery of the Orangery due to the latter having NPC characters to aid the narrative. Metzomagic said the game successfully reached its target market of primary school age children.
