= Paul Guillaume =

French art dealer (1891–1934)

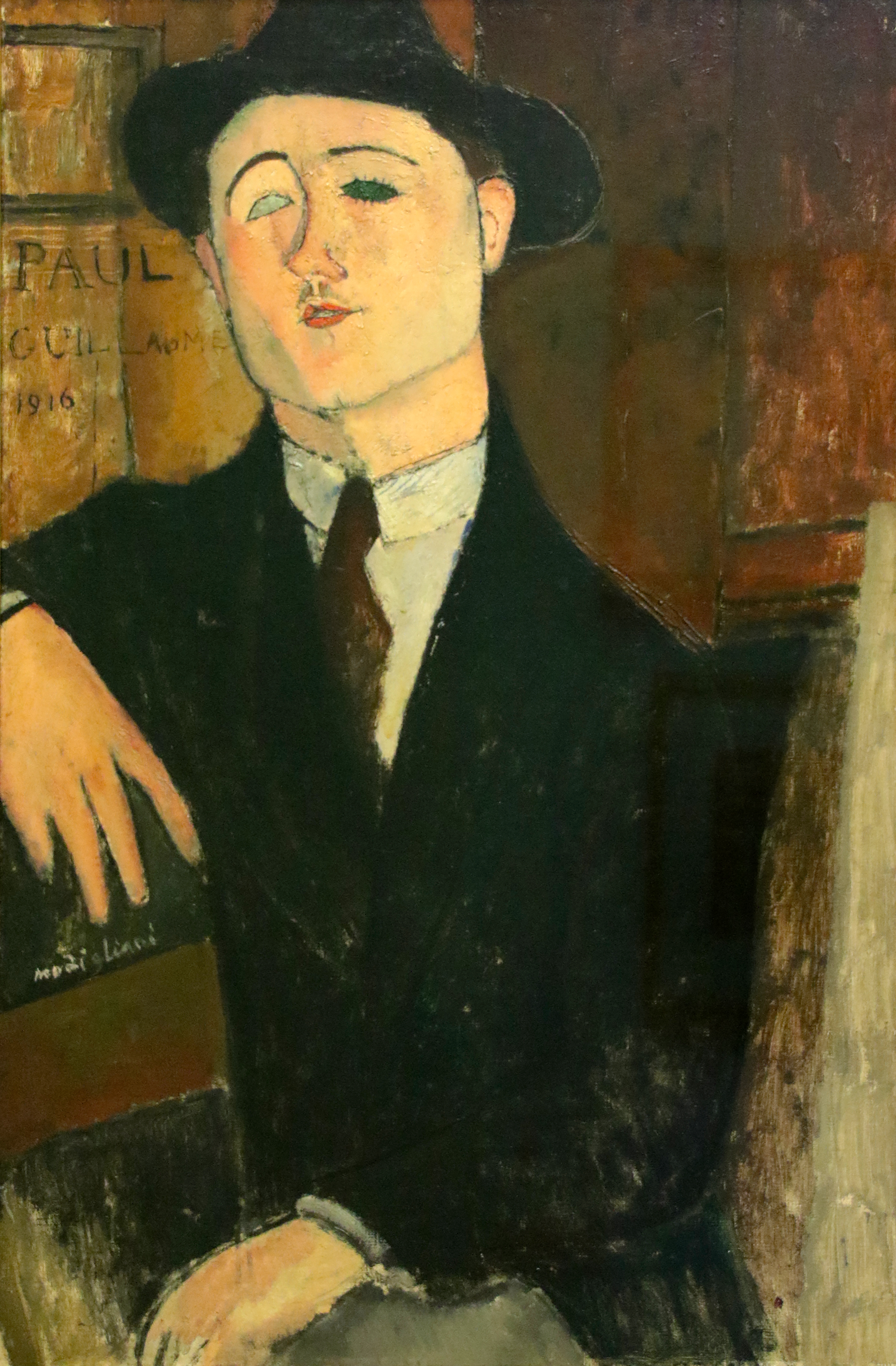
Amedeo Modigliani, Paul Guillaume, 1916, Museo del Novecento (Milan)

Paul Guillaume (French pronunciation: [pɔl ɡijom]; November 28, 1891 in Paris – October 1, 1934 in Paris) was a French art dealer. Dealer of Chaïm Soutine and Amedeo Modigliani, he was one of the first to organize African art exhibitions. He also bought and sold many works from cutting-edge artists of the time, such as Henri Matisse, Constantin Brâncuși, Pablo Picasso, and Giorgio de Chirico.

== Life ==
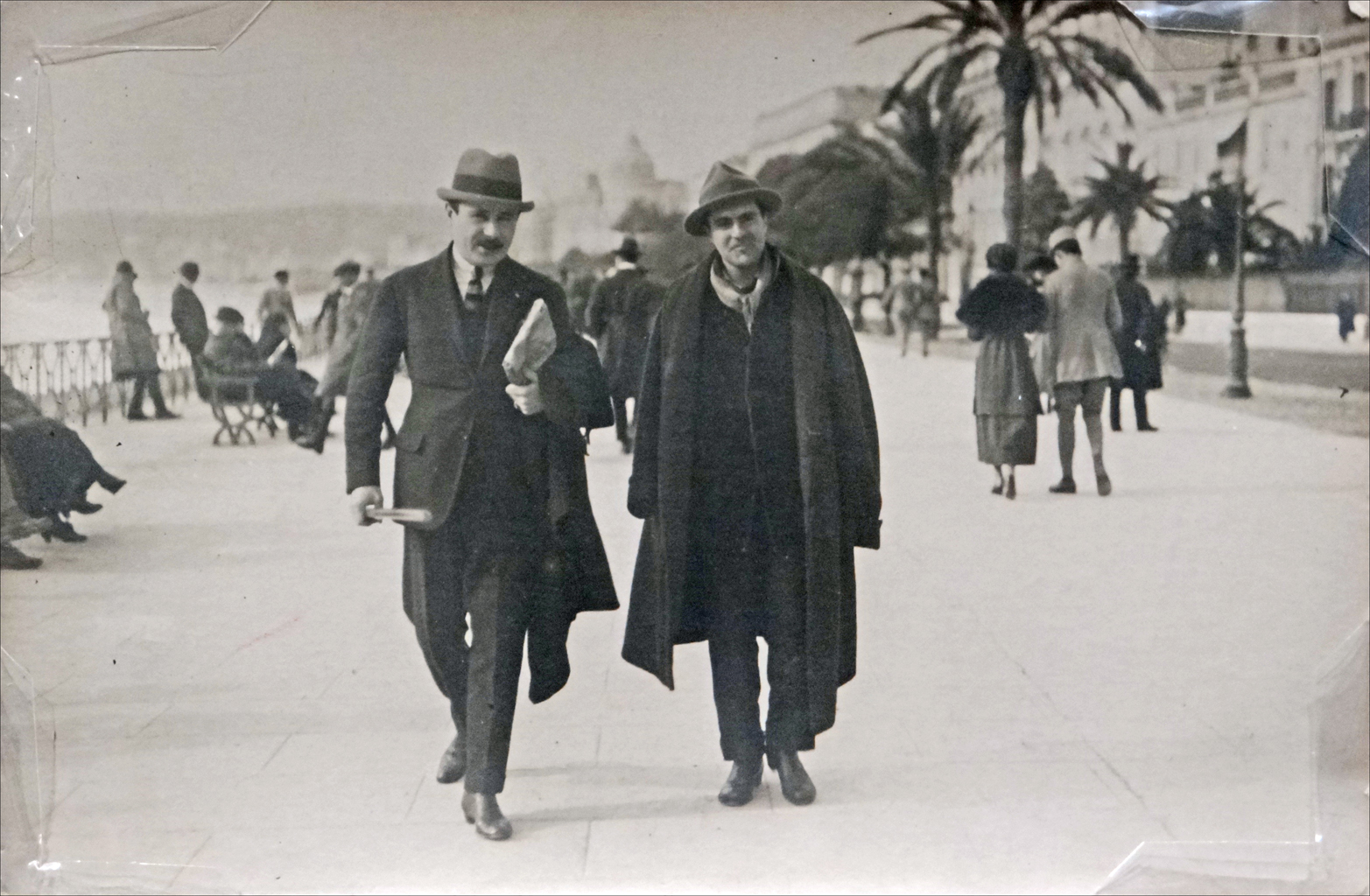
Paul Guillaume and Amedeo Modigliani in Nice in 1917, Musée de l'Orangerie, Paris

Being from modest origins, Paul Guillaume worked first as a mechanic in an automobile garage in Montmartre and then founded his own art gallery in Paris at rue de Miromesnil. In his gallery, he presented and sold especially the works of Amedeo Modigliani, who painted several portraits of him.

When he worked as a mechanic in an auto garage, he found some African sculptures in a delivery of rubber for the tyres, and made an exhibition of them in 1911 in the same garage. His display of them brought him to the attention of the poet Guillaume Apollinaire, who in turn introduced him to many of the artists of the beginning of the century in France — Pablo Picasso, Marie Laurencin ec. He soon organized important exhibitions, such as the Première Exposition d’Art Nègre et d’Art Océanien, on 13–19 May 1919, with a catalogue by Henri Clouzot and additional text by Apollinaire. Apollinaire, who died the previous year, had also collaborated with Paul Guillaume on the pioneering study Sculptures Nègres in 1917. This exhibition – drawn from Guillaume's private collection – placed African art at the heart of Modernism.

During the First World War, he exhibited the works of the so-called "metaphysical" period of Giorgio de Chirico on the stage of the Vieux-Colombier theatre, while also exhibiting André Derain, Pablo Picasso, Henri Matisse and Kees van Dongen in his gallery on rue de Miromesnil.

In October 1920, he married Juliette Marie Léonie Lacaze (1898-1977) whom he nicknamed “Domenica”. The couple first lived on Avenue de Messine and then in a luxurious 600 m2 apartment at 22, Avenue du Bois in Paris. As Picasso’s biographer John Richardson notes, Paul Guillaume came to live in grandeur, had taken to driving around with an entourage of assistants in two Hispano-Suizas, the chauffeurs “dressed up like generals in the Tsar’s imperial guard.”

In 1922, he advised and supplied paintings to Albert Barnes, the extremely wealthy American who created the foundation that bears his name near Philadelphia.

Paul Guillaume died prematurely in 1934 from peritonitis caused by untreated appendicitis. His wife's hesitation to have him hospitalized raised questions, but Domenica brushed off those concerns.

After his death, his wife Domenica married architect Jean Walter, whose mistress she had been during Paul Guillaume's illness, and modified Guillaume's collection, selling his most "extreme" paintings and acquiring more conservative impressionist paintings. After her own death, this collection of 20th-century paintings became part of the Musée de l'Orangerie in Paris.

== Collection’s inheritance and Lacaze affair ==
Domenica was once accused of the murder of Paul Guillaume, who died early and suspiciously. Some speculate that she was cleared of all charges in exchange for giving the collection to the French state after her death.

Paul Guillaume's testamentary provisions provided that if his wife did not have a child by him, a foundation would be heir. Domenica Guillaume then simulated a pregnancy, obtained a pregnancy certificate and finalized her stratagem by adopting a child, named Jean-Pierre Guillaume.

In 1959, Jean-Pierre Guillaume accused Dr. Maurice Lacour, Domenica Walter's lover, and her brother Jean Lacaze of plotting to murder him. Lacour was sentenced to prison. Domenica Walter's connections saved her from prosecution, but the most important part of the Walter-Guillaume collection (16 Cézannes, 23 Renoirs, 5 Modiglianis, 12 Picassos, 10 Matisses, 27 Derains and 22 Soutines) was transferred to the state in 1959 and 1963 as part of the deal negotiated by André Malraux, Minister of Culture.

The collection was not definitively integrated into the walls of the Musée de l'Orangerie until after Domenica Walter's death in 1977.
