= Jean Walter =

French architect

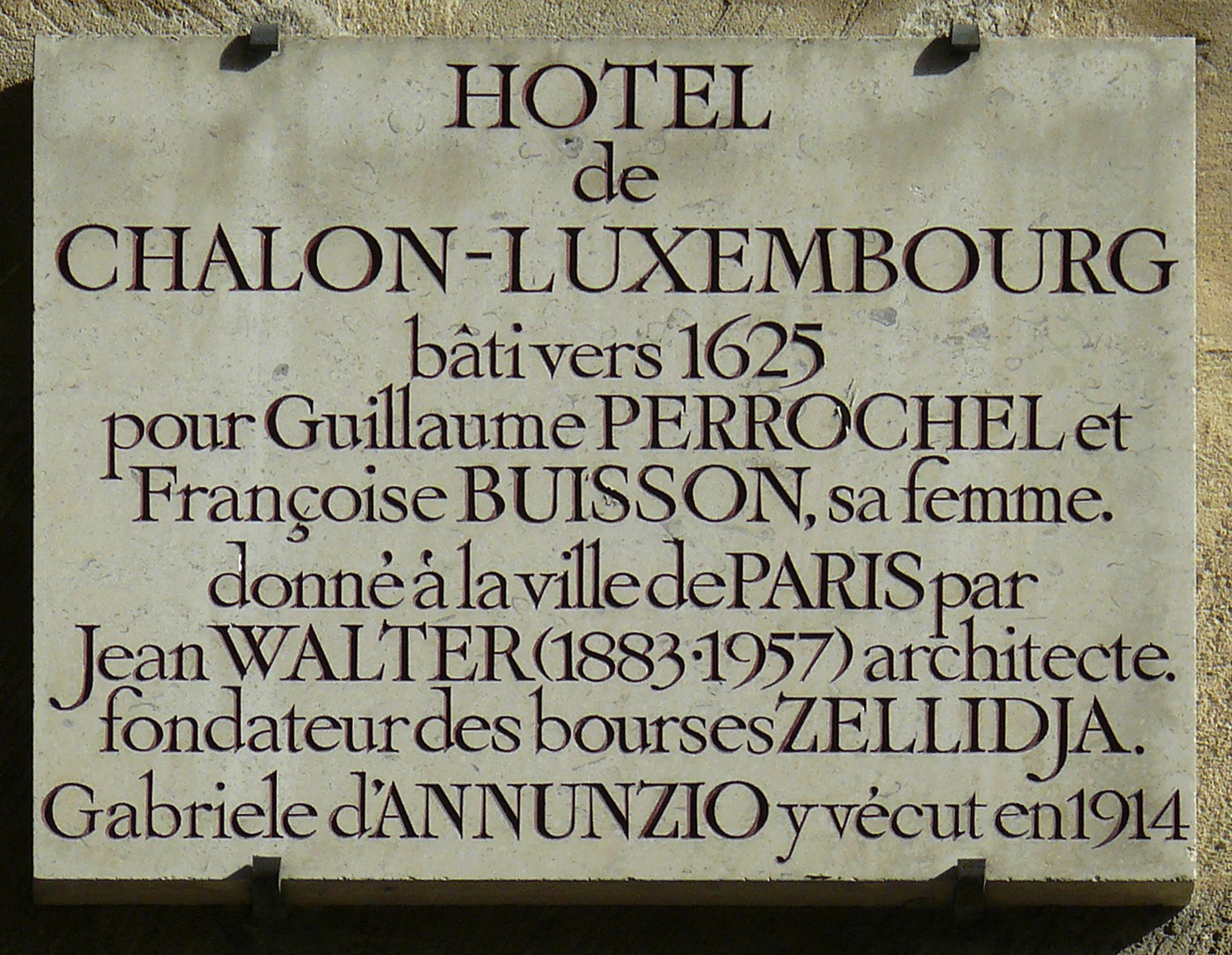
Plaque affixed to the Hôtel de Chalon-Luxembourg, n°26, rue Geoffroy-l'Asnier (Paris, 4th rounding.)

Jean Walter, (Montbéliard, 1883, Dordives – 1957), was a French architect who mainly worked for public housing, hospital architecture, and condominiums .

== Life ==
After his graduation in 1902 from the École Spéciale d'Architecture, he participated in the First World War, which he ended after an injury as a military attaché for Georges Clemenceau.

Having detected in 1925 a rich ore body of lead and zinc close to Oujda in Morocco, he founded in 1935 the "Société des mines de Zellidja", which brought him wealth and notoriety. In 1941, he married Domenica Guillaume, the widow of art dealer Paul Guillaume.

He died suspiciously in 1957 after being hit by a car, leading some to speculate that his wife was responsible for his death.

== See also ==
- Public housing in France
