= Musée de l'Orangerie =

Art museum in Paris

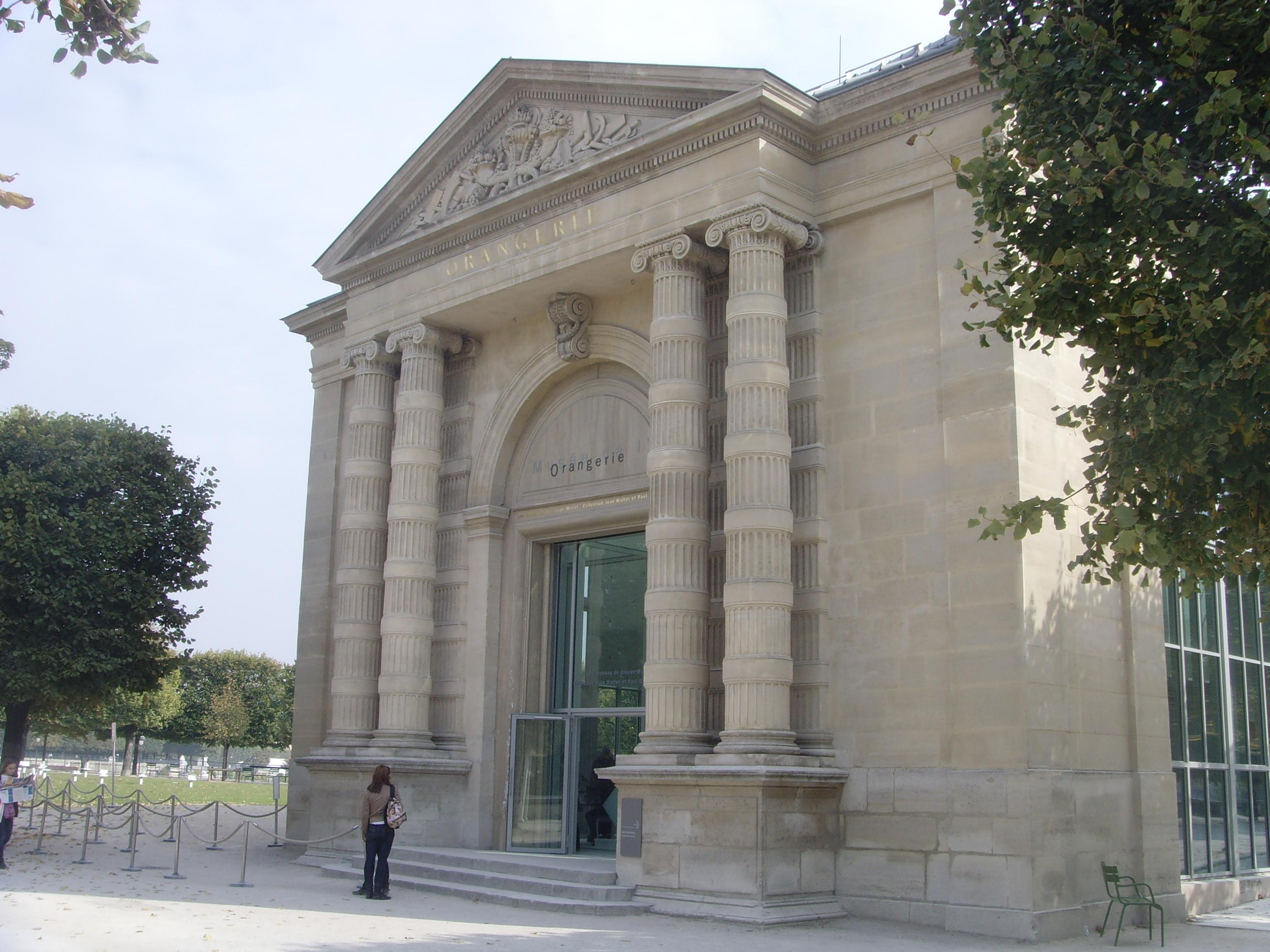
- Musée de l'Orangerie entrance
- Interactive fullscreen map
- Established: 1852
- Location: Place de la Concorde; 75001 Paris; France
- Coordinates: 48°51′50″N 2°19′21″E
- Type: Art museum (Impressionist and Post-Impressionist paintings)
- Director: Marie-Paule Vial
- Public transit access: Concorde
- Website: musee-orangerie.fr

The Musée de l'Orangerie (English: Orangery Museum) is an art gallery of Impressionist and Post-Impressionist paintings located in the west corner of the Tuileries Garden next to the Place de la Concorde in Paris. The museum is most famous as the permanent home of eight large Water Lilies murals by Claude Monet, and also contains works by Paul Cézanne, Henri Matisse, Amedeo Modigliani, Pablo Picasso, Pierre-Auguste Renoir, Henri Rousseau, Alfred Sisley, Chaïm Soutine, Maurice Utrillo, and others.

== Location ==
The gallery is on the bank of the Seine in the old orangery of the Tuileries Palace on the Place de la Concorde near the Concorde metro station and not far from the Louvre and the Musee d'Orsay.

== History ==
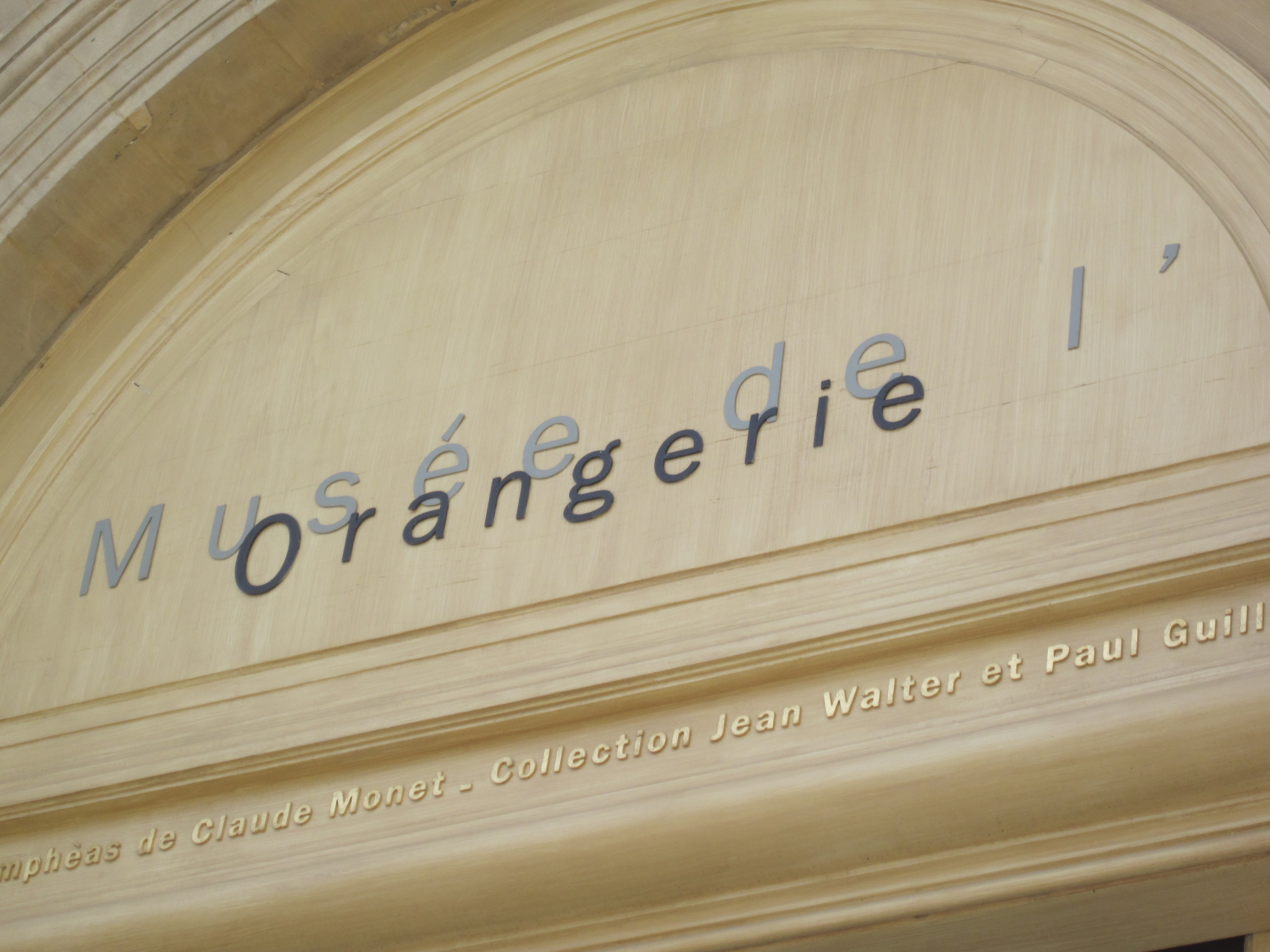
The name of the museum inscribed above the door

Napoleon III had the Orangerie built in 1852, to store the citrus trees of the Tuileries garden from the cold in the winter. The building was built by architect Firmin Bourgeois (1786–1853). Bourgeois built the Orangerie out of glass on the (south) Seine side to allow light to the trees but the opposite (north) side is almost completely windowless to protect the citrus trees from the cold winds. Before the Orangerie was built, the trees were stored in the Grande Galerie of the Louvre. The main entrances on the east and west side of the building were decorated by architect Louis Visconti (1791–1853) who is also known for his renovations on the Louvre. The columns located at the doors are topped by triangular pediments that were sculpted by Charles Gallois-Poignant. The tops of the columns represent cornucopias, plants and ears of corn that relate to the building's agricultural function. After the Fall of the Empire in 1870 and the fire at the Tuileries Palace in 1871, the Orangerie became a property of the State, which continued to use the Orangerie in its original function as well as for public events such as music concerts, art expositions, contests and dog shows until 1922.

== Monet's Water Lilies ==
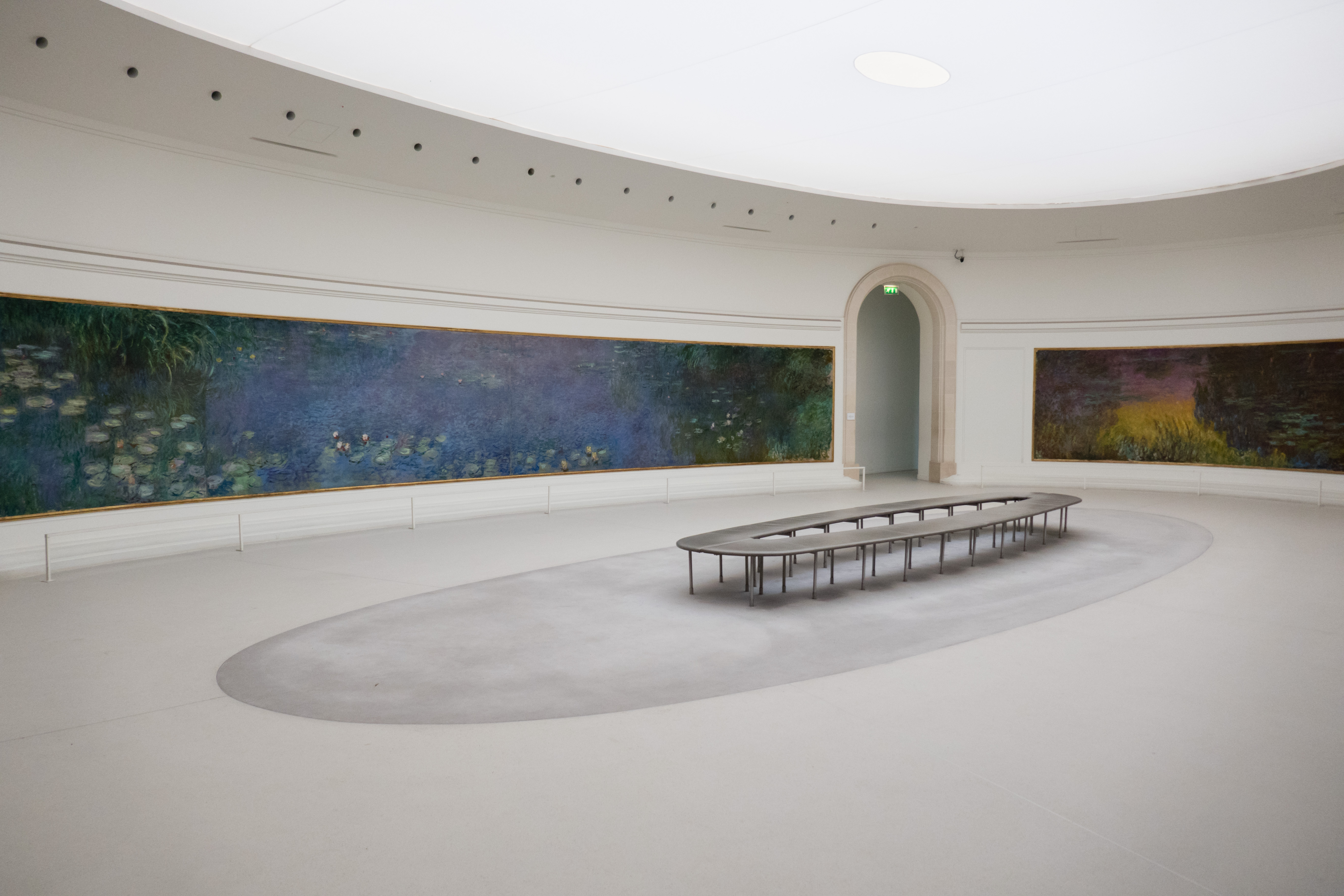
Two of the eight Claude Monet Nymphéas on display in the museum

Floor plan with oval rooms for Monet's Nymphéas on upper floor and galleries for rest of the collection on lower floor

After World War I, changes came to the Orangerie. In 1921, the State gave the building to the Under-Secretariat of State for Fine Arts along with another building, the Jeu de Paume. The goal for these two buildings was to provide a space for living artists to display their works. At the time, Claude Monet (1840–1926) was painting a series of Water Lilies (Nymphéas) paintings for the State that were destined for another museum, the Musée Rodin. The President of the Council, Georges Clemenceau (1841–1929), wanted the paintings placed in the Orangerie instead.

The Water Lilies donation to the Orangerie was finalized in 1922. Monet helped architect Camille Lefèvre with the architectural design in which eight panels, each two metres high and spanning 91 metres in length, are arranged in two oval rooms which form the infinity symbol. Monet also required skylights for observing the paintings in natural light. Due to the east to west orientation of the building the rooms are in the path of the Sun, which stretches along the same axis as the Arc de Triomphe to the Louvre. Originally, the museum was inaugurated on 17 May 1927 as the Musée Claude Monet, a few months after the artist's death. It was then annexed into the Musée du Luxembourg and formally renamed the Musée National de l'Orangerie des Tuileries.

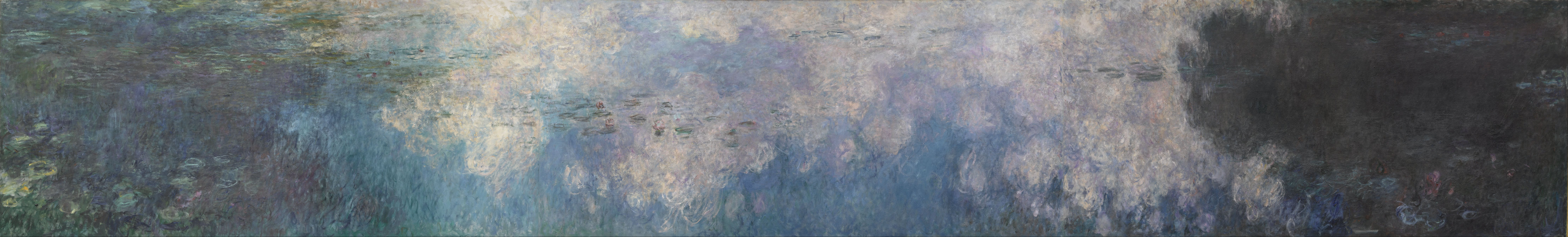
The Water Lilies – The Clouds, 1920–1926, Claude Monet, one of Monet's eight large oil-on-canvas murals displayed in two oval rooms in the museum

== Exhibits between 1930 and 1950 ==
The Orangerie was joined with the Louvre in 1930. The western half of the Orangerie was dedicated to temporary exhibitions for the Louvre and other national museums in France. Each year, the Orangerie hosted a variety of exhibitions. From 1930 to 1933, the Orangerie hosted an exhibition on Impressionism. In 1934, the exhibition Peintres de la realité (Painters of Reality) was dedicated to the 17th century and became famous. In 1936, the exhibition Rubens et son temps (Rubens and his Age) attracted a million visitors to the museum. There was an entire exhibition dedicated to Degas in 1937, titled in his name. In 1942, there was an exhibition dedicated entirely to Arno Breker, who was an official artist of the Third Reich and who studied in France. In 1946, after the end of World War II, many masterpieces from private collections were recovered in Germany by the French Commission for Art Recovery and the Monuments Men and they were displayed in the Orangerie. The Orangerie and the Jeu de Paume were allied with the Paintings Department of the Louvre. The Réunion des Musées Nationaux organized successful exhibitions at the Orangerie between 1946 and 1960. The building of the Galeries Nationales du Grand Palais in 1964 was due to the success of the exhibitions of the Orangerie.

== The Jean Walter and Paul Guillaume Collection ==
The Jean Walter and Paul Guillaume collections were acquired in 1959 and 1963 respectively. Domenica Walter (1898–1977) was the widow of both Paul Guillaume (1891–1934) and Jean Walter (1883–1957). Paul Guillaume was an art dealer and his desire was to create a museum of French modern art that would be open to the public. When the State offered to show this collection at the Orangerie after his death, Domenica agreed. Olivier Lahalled (1960–1965) executed the renovation project to accommodate the new acquisition. The existing exhibition galleries were knocked down and two levels were added to the building. A staircase with a banister was designed by Raymond Subes (1893–1970) which replaced the entrance to the Water Lilies paintings and led to rooms that displayed the new collection. In 1966, the collection was publicly presented and inaugurated by the Minister of Culture, André Malraux, however, Domenica officially owned the paintings until her death in 1977. There was a third renovation project conducted between 1978 and 1984 to consolidate the buildings, refurbish the rooms and permanently house the collection which was given to the Orangerie after Domenica's death. The Orangerie then became separate from the administration of the Louvre and the Jeu de Paume, whose impressionist paintings would be destined for the future Musée d'Orsay.

== Renovations between 2000 and 2006 ==
The most recent renovation was made by Olivier Brochet between 2000 and 2006. The rooms that were previously constructed on two levels were knocked down and natural light was restored to the Water Lilies. In order to display the Jean Walter and Paul Guillaume collection, rooms were dug out of the basement level. Temporary exhibition spaces, an auditorium, an education space and a library were also created. The renovations were delayed and changed after the discovery of remains of the Louis XIII wall which was constructed in 1566 to protect the Tuileries Palace. The museum was reopened on 17 May 2006.

In 2010 the Orangerie and the Musée d'Orsay were linked administratively under the Établissement public des musées d'Orsay et de l'Orangerie – Valéry Giscard d'Estaing (EPMO). On occasion, the Orangerie still hosts dance and piano concerts and other events in the restored Water Lilies gallery.

== In popular culture ==
The Musée de l'Orangerie is the main story point of the 2000 French adventure PC game Monet: The Mystery of the Orangery.

The art gallery, specifically the Water Lilies paintings, was featured in Woody Allen's 2011 film Midnight in Paris and Mia Hansen-Løve's 2022 film One Fine Morning.

== Timeline ==
The official site of the Orangerie presents a full historical timeline.

== See also ==
- List of tourist attractions in Paris
- Orangerie du Sénat

== Bibliography ==
- Georgel, Pierre (trans. from the French by John Adamson) (2006). The Musée de l'Orangerie Paris: Éditions Gallimard/Réunion des musées nationaux ISBN 9782070781676
- Hoog, Michel (trans. by Jean-Marie Clarke) (1989, reprinted 2006). Musée de l'Orangerie, les Nymphéas of Claude Monet Paris: Réunion des musées nationaux ISBN 9782711850693
- "2000–2006: a New Museum." 2000–2006: a New Museum | Musée De L'Orangerie, 2019, www.musee-orangerie.fr/en/article/2000-2006-new-museum.
- "The Acquisition of the Jean Walter and Paul Guillaume Collection." The Acquisition of the Jean Walter and Paul Guillaume Collection | Musée De L'Orangerie, 2019, www.musee-orangerie.fr/en/article/acquisition-jean-walter-and-paul-guillaume-collection.
- "The Building from the Second Empire to the Water Lilies." The Building from the Second Empire to the Water Lilies | Musée De L'Orangerie, 2019, www.musee-orangerie.fr/en/article/building-second-empire-water-lilies.
- "Chronology." Chronology | Musée De L'Orangerie, 2019, www.musee-orangerie.fr/en/article/chronology.
- "The Installation of the Water Lilies." The Installation of the Water Lilies | Musée De L'Orangerie, 2019, www.musee-orangerie.fr/en/article/installation-water-lilies.
- Madeline, Laurence. La Collection Walter-Guillaume Et Les Nymphéas De Monet: Musée De L'Orangerie. Nouvelles Éditions Scala, 2017.
- "Major Exhibitions at the Musée De L'Orangerie from the 1930s to the 1950s." Major Exhibitions at the Musée De L'Orangerie from the 1930s to the 1950s | Musée De L'Orangerie, 2019, www.musee-orangerie.fr/en/article/major-exhibitions-musee-de-lorangerie-1930s-1950s.
