= List of National Natural Landmarks in Connecticut =

Connecticut National Natural Landmarks (clickable map)

There are eight National Natural Landmarks in Connecticut. They represent the geological and ecological history of Connecticut, including glacial features such as bogs, old growth forests and swamps. There are also well preserved dinosaur tracks,

Name	Image	Date	Location	County	Ownership	Description
Bartholomew's Cobble		October 1971	Canaan 42.057222°N 73.350833°W	Litchfield	private	Open space preserve, agricultural preserve, and bio-reserve primarily located in Ashley Falls, Massachusetts and edging into Canaan, Connecticut. The preserve contains over 800 plant species including North America's greatest diversity of ferns. It is open to the public with hiking trails and a visitors center.
Beckley Bog		May 1977	Norfolk 41.96889°N 73.16222°W	Litchfield	private	The southernmost Sphagnum-heath-black spruce bog in New England. Purchased by the Nature Conservancy in 1956.
Bingham Pond Bog		May 1973	Salisbury 42.02028°N 73.46639°W	Litchfield	private	A rare undisturbed northern black spruce bog, which is missing the more common Sphagnum moss.
Cathedral Pines		May 1982	Cornwall 41.836044°N 73.325163°W	Litchfield	private (The Nature Conservancy)	A large tract of old-growth white pine and hemlock forest owned by the Nature Conservancy which was mostly destroyed by tornadoes in 1989.
Chester Cedar Swamp		May 1973	Chester 41.387499°N 72.488995°W	Middlesex	mixed- state, municipal	Known for its Atlantic white cedar swamp within the Cockaponset State Forest.
Dinosaur Trackway		April 1968	Rocky Hill 41.651944°N 72.656944°W	Hartford	state	One of the largest dinosaur track sites in North America, with a fine display of early Jurassic fossil tracks in sandstone from about 200 million years ago.
McLean Game Refuge Natural Areas		November 1973	Granby 41.920545°N 72.788544°W	Hartford	private	4,400 acres (1,800 ha) forest in multiple tracts has a very diverse group of species as well as evidence of glacial activity.
Pachaug-Great Meadow Swamp		May 1973	Voluntown 41.599167°N 71.878056°W	New London	mixed- state, private	Known for the Atlantic white cedar swamp inside the Pachaug State Forest. Includes sections of the Pachaug River and the Great Meadow Brook.

== See also ==
List of National Historic Landmarks in Connecticut
