= List of National Historic Landmarks in Connecticut =

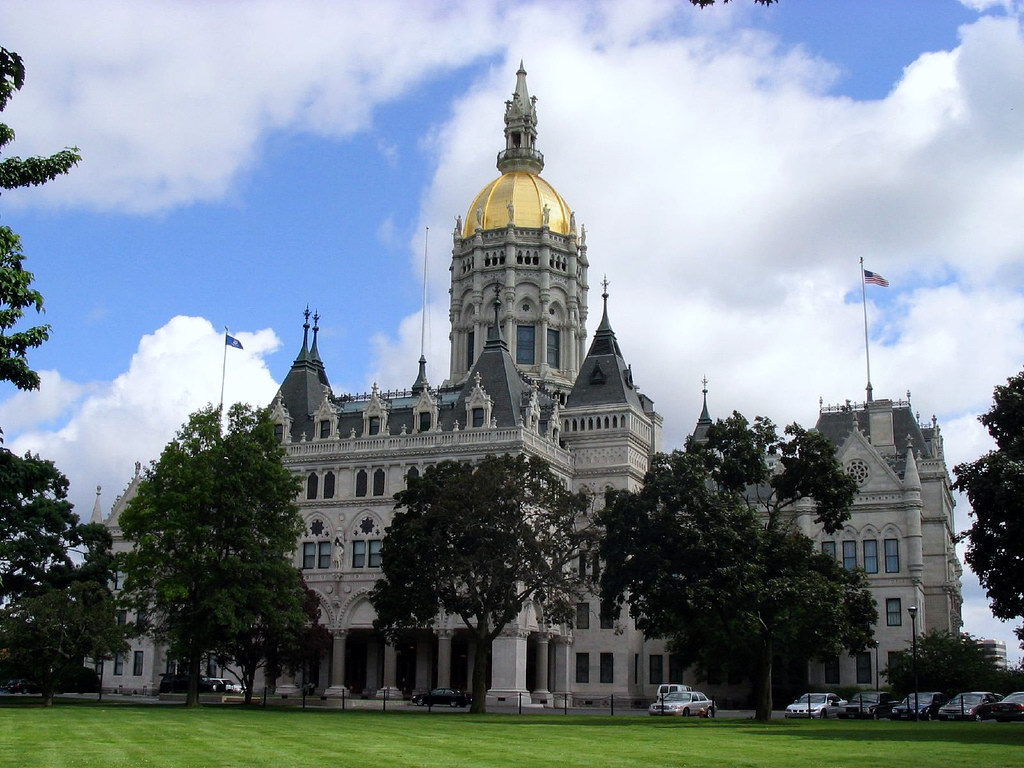
The Connecticut State Capitol

This article describes National Historic Landmarks in the United States state of Connecticut. These include the most highly recognized historic sites in Connecticut that are officially designated and/or funded and operated by the U.S. Federal Government. There are no UNESCO-designated World Heritage Sites in Connecticut. There are many additional historic sites in Connecticut that are federally recognized by listing on the National Register of Historic Places, but only those NRHP-listed sites meeting particularly higher standards are further designated as National Historic Landmarks.

== Key ==
	National Historic Landmark
^{†}	National Historic Landmark District
^{#}	National Historic Site, National Historical Park, National Memorial, or National Monument
^{*}	Delisted Landmark

== Current National Historic Landmarks ==
	Landmark name	Image	Date designated	Location	County	Description
1	Richard Alsop IV House	Richard Alsop IV House	January 16, 2009 (#70000686)	Middletown; 41°33′30″N 72°39′22″W	Middlesex	This distinctive house was built in the late 1830s in a transitional Greek-Italianate style. It now belongs to Wesleyan University.
2	A. Everett Austin House	A. Everett Austin House	April 19, 1994 (#94001189)	Hartford; 41°46′51″N 72°42′33″W	Hartford	Social hotspot and home of innovative Wadsworth Atheneum director Arthur Everett Austin Jr.
3	Henry Barnard House	Henry Barnard House	December 21, 1965 (#66000803)	Hartford; 41°45′25″N 72°40′33″W	Hartford	Home of educator instrumental in the development of the American public school system.
4	Barnum Institute of Science and History	Barnum Institute of Science and History	December 11, 2023 (#100009807)	Bridgeport; 41°10′32″N 73°11′18″W	Fairfield	Only surviving building associated with influential 19th-century entertainer P.T. Barnum.
5^{†}	Birdcraft Sanctuary	Birdcraft Sanctuary	April 19, 1993 (#82004371)	Fairfield; 41°08′39″N 73°15′31″W	Fairfield	Oldest bird sanctuary in the U.S., where Mabel Osgood Wright originated "birdscaping".
6	Henry C. Bowen House (Roseland)	Henry C. Bowen House (Roseland)	October 5, 1992 (#77001414)	Woodstock; 41°56′50″N 71°58′36″W	Windham	Gothic revival summer cottage visited by three U.S. presidents.
7	Bush-Holley House	Bush-Holley House	July 17, 1991 (#88002694)	Greenwich; 41°02′05″N 73°35′53″W	Fairfield	Home of Cos Cob Art Colony, c.1890-1920.
8	Buttolph–Williams House	Buttolph–Williams House	November 24, 1968 (#68000048)	Wethersfield; 41°42′37″N 72°39′02″W	Hartford	Exemplifies traditional early New England design.
9	Charles W. Morgan (Bark)	Charles W. Morgan (Bark)	November 13, 1966 (#66000804)	Mystic; 41°21′39″N 71°57′55″W	New London	Only surviving wooden ship from the nineteenth-century American whaling fleet.
10^{†}	Cheney Brothers Historic District	Cheney Brothers Historic District	June 2, 1978 (#78002885)	Manchester; 41°45′52″N 72°31′32″W	Hartford	A nineteenth century silk mill and traditional company town.
11	Russell Henry Chittenden House	Russell Henry Chittenden House	May 15, 1975 (#75001944)	New Haven; 41°18′48″N 72°55′23″W	New Haven	Home of Russell Henry Chittenden, the "father of American biochemistry".
12^{†}	Coltsville Historic District	Coltsville Historic District	November 13, 1966 (#66000802)	Hartford; 41°45′13″N 72°40′28″W	Hartford	Originally designated solely to encompass Armsmear, the home of arms maker Samuel Colt, this historic district was expanded in 1988 to include the Colt Armory, as well as worker housing and Colt Park.
13	Connecticut Agricultural Experiment Station	Connecticut Agricultural Experiment Station	July 19, 1964 (#66000805)	New Haven; 41°19′44″N 72°55′11″W	New Haven	Home of the first state agricultural experiment station
14	Connecticut Hall, Yale University	Connecticut Hall, Yale University	December 21, 1965 (#66000806)	New Haven; 41°18′22″N 72°55′46″W	New Haven	Oldest building at Yale University
15	Connecticut State Capitol	Connecticut State Capitol	December 30, 1970 (#70000834)	Hartford; 41°45′44″N 72°40′58″W	Hartford	Designed by Richard Upjohn in Gothic and French Renaissance styles topped by gold leaf dome
16	Prudence Crandall House	Prudence Crandall House	July 17, 1991 (#70000696)	Canterbury; 41°41′46″N 71°58′19″W	Windham	Home of the abolitionist and educator Prudence Crandall
17	James Dwight Dana House	James Dwight Dana House	January 12, 1965 (#66000874)	New Haven; 41°18′48″N 72°55′25″W	New Haven	Home of Yale geologist James Dwight Dana, designed by Henry Austin.
18	Silas Deane House	Silas Deane House	November 28, 1972 (#70000835)	Wethersfield; 41°42′42″N 72°39′10″W	Hartford	Home of Silas Deane, member of the Continental Congress and America's first diplomat
19	Oliver Ellsworth Homestead	Oliver Ellsworth Homestead	December 20, 1989 (#70000707)	Windsor; 41°52′43″N 72°37′29″W	Hartford	Home of Oliver Ellsworth, the third Chief Justice of the United States.
20	Emma C. Berry	Emma C. Berry	October 12, 1994 (#94001649)	Mystic; 41°21′35″N 71°57′59″W	New London	One of the oldest surviving commercial vessels in the United States.
21	First Church of Christ	First Church of Christ	May 15, 1975 (#75002056)	Farmington; 41°43′17″N 72°49′48″W	Hartford	Church of the La Amistad freed slaves.
22	First Presbyterian Church	First Presbyterian Church	January 13, 2021 (#100006271)	Stamford; 41°03′47″N 73°32′19″W	Fairfield	Aka the Fish Church, a major Modernist church design
23^{†}	Fort Shantok Archeological District	Fort Shantok Archeological District	April 12, 1993 (#86000469)	Montville; 41°28′40″N 72°04′40″W	New London	Mohegan settlement and home of the seventeenth century sachem Uncas.
24	Florence Griswold House and Museum	Florence Griswold House and Museum	April 19, 1993 (#93001604)	Old Lyme; 41°19′31″N 72°19′35″W	New London	Boarding house frequented by American impressionist artists such as Henry Ward Ranger, Childe Hassam, and Willard Metcalf.
25^{†}	Grove Street Cemetery	Grove Street Cemetery	February 16, 2000 (#97000830)	New Haven; 41°18′49″N 72°55′39″W	New Haven	Final resting place of many Yale and New Haven notables including Roger Sherman, Noah Webster and Eli Whitney.
26	Hill–Stead	Hill–Stead	July 17, 1991 (#91002056)	Farmington; 41°43′11″N 72°49′29″W	Hartford	Colonial revival house and art museum located in the Farmington Historic District
27	Samuel Huntington Birthplace	Samuel Huntington Birthplace	November 11, 1971 (#71001009)	Scotland; 41°41′55″N 72°05′08″W	Windham	Boyhood saltbox home of the American statesman Samuel Huntington, a signer of the Declaration of Independence, Governor of Connecticut and first presiding officer of the Congress of the Confederation
28^{†}	Philip Johnson Glass House	Philip Johnson Glass House	February 18, 1997 (#97000341)	New Canaan; 41°08′33″N 73°31′46″W	Fairfield	Modern masterpiece of glass and steel; designed and occupied by architect Philip Johnson.
29	Kimberly Mansion	Kimberly Mansion	May 30, 1974 (#74002178)	Glastonbury; 41°41′21″N 72°36′22″W	Hartford	Home of Abby and Julia Smith, suffragists who successfully fought the town of Glastonbury on the issue of taxation without representation.
30	L. A. Dunton (schooner)	L. A. Dunton (schooner)	November 4, 1993 (#93001612)	Mystic; 41°21′23″N 71°57′58″W	New London	Classic fishing schooner and one of the last sail-powered fishing vessels built.
31^{†}	Litchfield Historic District	Litchfield Historic District	November 24, 1968 (#68000050)	Litchfield; 41°44′51″N 73°11′25″W	Litchfield	Well-preserved late 18th-early 19th century New England town that was the state's first historic district.
32	Lockwood–Mathews Mansion	Lockwood–Mathews Mansion	November 30, 1970 (#70000836)	Norwalk; 41°06′36″N 73°25′05″W	Fairfield	Second Empire style mansion built in 1864.
33	Othniel C. Marsh House	Othniel C. Marsh House	January 12, 1965 (#66000875)	New Haven; 41°19′18″N 72°55′24″W	New Haven	Home of Yale paleontologist Othniel Marsh; now part of the Yale School of Forestry (Marsh Hall).
34^{†}	Mashantucket Pequot Reservation Archeological District	Mashantucket Pequot Reservation Archeological District	April 12, 1993 (#86001323)	Ledyard; 41°27′32″N 71°58′22″W	New London	Expansive district on the Mashantucket Pequot Reservation containing archaeological remains relevant to Pequot history.
35	Stephen Tyng Mather Home	Stephen Tyng Mather Home	November 27, 1963 (#66000877)	Darien; 41°06′45″N 73°28′27″W	Fairfield	Home of conservationist Stephen Tyng Mather, who was instrumental in the formation of the National Park Service and served as its first director.
36	Lafayette B. Mendel House	Lafayette B. Mendel House	January 7, 1976 (#76002138)	New Haven; 41°18′40″N 72°55′06″W	New Haven	Home of Yale biochemist Lafayette Mendel; designed by Henry Austin
37	James Merrill House	James Merrill House	October 31, 2016 (#13000618)	Stonington; 41°20′01″N 71°54′24″W	New London	Home of James Merrill, one of the most significant American writers of the second half of the 20th century.
38	Monte Cristo Cottage(Eugene O'Neill House)	Monte Cristo Cottage	July 17, 1971 (#71001010)	New London; 41°19′56″N 72°05′45″W	New London	Home of the Nobel Prize-winning playwright Eugene O'Neill.
39	Edward W. Morley House	Edward W. Morley House	May 15, 1975 (#75002057)	West Hartford; 41°45′27″N 72°45′12″W	Hartford	Home of physicist Edward W. Morley, known for the Michelson–Morley experiment and for his work on the atomic weights of hydrogen and oxygen.
40	USS NAUTILUS (nuclear submarine)	USS NAUTILUS (nuclear submarine)	May 20, 1982 (#79002653)	Groton; 41°23′13″N 72°05′17″W	New London	The world's first operational nuclear-powered submarine.
41^{†}	New Haven Green Historic District	New Haven Green Historic District	December 30, 1970 (#70000838)	New Haven; 41°18′29″N 72°55′37″W	New Haven	Large town green includes three historic churches.
42	Charles H. Norton House	Charles H. Norton House	May 11, 1976 (#76002139)	Plainville; 41°39′37″N 72°53′07″W	Hartford	Home of Charles H. Norton, the inventor of precision grinding equipment.
43	Old New-Gate Prison	Old New-Gate Prison	November 28, 1972 (#70000839)	East Granby; 41°57′36″N 72°44′44″W	Hartford	Colonial prison; Loyalists were held here during the American Revolutionary War
44	Old State House	Old State House	December 18, 1960 (#66000878)	Hartford; 41°45′57″N 72°40′24″W	Hartford	Federal style building designed by Charles Bulfinch and completed in 1796.
45	Capt. Nathaniel B. Palmer House	Capt. Nathaniel B. Palmer House	June 19, 1996 (#96000971)	Stonington; 41°20′34″N 71°54′23″W	New London	Home of the pioneering Antarctic explorer and seal hunter Nathaniel Palmer.
46	Portland Brownstone Quarries	Portland Brownstone Quarries	May 16, 2000 (#00000703)	Portland; 41°34′32″N 72°38′36″W	Middlesex	These quarries, active since 1690, were the source of vast quantities of brownstone for New York City, Philadelphia, Boston, other urban areas' buildings.
47	Tapping Reeve House and Law School	Tapping Reeve House and Law School	December 21, 1965 (#66000879)	Litchfield; 41°44′31″N 73°11′20″W	Litchfield	First law school in the United States separate from a college or university, its influential graduates included Aaron Burr, Jr. and John C. Calhoun.
48	Frederic Remington House	Frederic Remington House	December 21, 1965 (#66000880)	Ridgefield; 41°17′05″N 73°30′59″W	Fairfield	Home of painter and sculptor Frederic Remington, famous for his depictions of the American West.
49	John Rogers Studio	John Rogers Studio	December 21, 1965 (#66000881)	New Canaan; 41°09′00″N 73°29′51″W	Fairfield	Studio of the popular nineteenth century sculptor John Rogers.
50	Samuel Wadsworth Russell House	Samuel Wadsworth Russell House	August 7, 2001 (#70000688)	Middletown; 41°33′37″N 72°39′20″W	Middlesex	Greek Revival mansion, designed by Ithiel Town; now part of Wesleyan University.
51	Sabino (Passenger Steamboat)	Sabino (Passenger Steamboat)	October 5, 1992 (#92001887)	Mystic; 41°21′32″N 71°58′02″W	New London	One of only two surviving members of the American "mosquito fleet", small steamers that served the inland waters of the United States.
52	Stanley-Whitman House	Stanley-Whitman House	October 9, 1960 (#66000882)	Farmington; 41°43′23″N 72°49′25″W	Hartford	Classic seventeenth century New England saltbox.
53	The Steward's House, Foreign Mission School	The Steward's House, Foreign Mission School	October 31, 2016 (#16000858)	Cornwall; 41°50′38″N 73°19′51″W	Litchfield	The first and last experiment in a domestically located "foreign" mission and represents educational and social politics concerning racial tolerance, Asian and Native American migration, and American identity in the early 19th century.
54	Harriet Beecher Stowe House	Harriet Beecher Stowe House	February 27, 2013 (#70000710)	Hartford; 41°46′01″N 72°42′03″W	Hartford	Home of 19th century abolitionist writer and reform advocate Harriet Beecher Stowe, author of Uncle Tom's Cabin.
55	Jonathan Sturges House (The Cottage)	Jonathan Sturges House (The Cottage)	April 19, 1994 (#84000247)	Fairfield; 41°08′47″N 73°16′00″W	Fairfield	Early Gothic-revival cottage
56	Ida Tarbell House	Ida Tarbell House	April 19, 1993 (#93001602)	Easton; 41°17′12″N 73°19′35″W	Fairfield	Home of the muckraking journalist and author Ida Tarbell.
57	John Trumbull Birthplace	John Trumbull Birthplace	December 21, 1965 (#66000883)	Lebanon; 41°38′03″N 72°12′56″W	New London	Home of Connecticut Governor Jonathan Trumbull and birthplace of his son John Trumbull, the "painter of the Revolution"
58	Mark Twain Home	Mark Twain Home	December 29, 1962 (#66000884)	Hartford; 41°46′03″N 72°42′05″W	Hartford	Home of author, lecturer, and satirist Mark Twain from 1874 to 1891.
59	Joseph Webb House	Joseph Webb House	January 20, 1961 (#66000885)	Wethersfield; 41°42′43″N 72°39′10″W	Hartford	Site of the 1781 American Revolutionary War conference between General George Washington and French General Rochambeau.
60	Noah Webster Birthplace	Noah Webster Birthplace	December 29, 1962 (#66000886)	West Hartford; 41°44′50″N 72°44′45″W	Hartford	Home of the American lexicographer Noah Webster.
61	Henry Whitfield House	Henry Whitfield House	September 25, 1997 (#72001327)	Guilford; 41°16′39″N 72°40′35″W	New Haven	The oldest house in Connecticut, built in 1639
62	Austin F. Williams Carriagehouse and House	Austin F. Williams Carriagehouse and House	August 6, 1998 (#98001190)	Farmington; 41°43′04″N 72°50′02″W	Hartford	Temporary quarters for the Amistad Africans and a "station" on the Underground Railroad
63	William Williams House	William Williams House	November 11, 1971 (#71001012)	Lebanon; 41°38′03″N 72°12′46″W	New London	Home of William Williams, a signer of the Declaration of Independence.
64	Oliver Wolcott House	Oliver Wolcott House	November 11, 1971 (#71001011)	Litchfield; 41°44′36″N 73°11′16″W	Litchfield	Home of the soldier and politician Oliver Wolcott, a signer of the Declaration of Independence and Governor of Connecticut
65	Yale Bowl	Yale Bowl	February 27, 1987 (#87000756)	New Haven; 41°18′47″N 72°57′38″W	New Haven	Bowl stadium, model for Rose Bowl and others. Home of the Bulldogs and The Game.

== Former National Historic Landmarks ==
	Landmark name	Image	Date listed	Locality	County	Description
1	First Telephone Exchange		January 29, 1964	New Haven	New Haven	Location of the first commercial telephone exchange. Building was demolished in 1973 and replaced by a parking garage

== See also ==
- National Register of Historic Places listings in Connecticut
- List of U.S. National Historic Landmarks by state
- List of National Natural Landmarks in Connecticut
