= National Register of Historic Places listings in Connecticut =

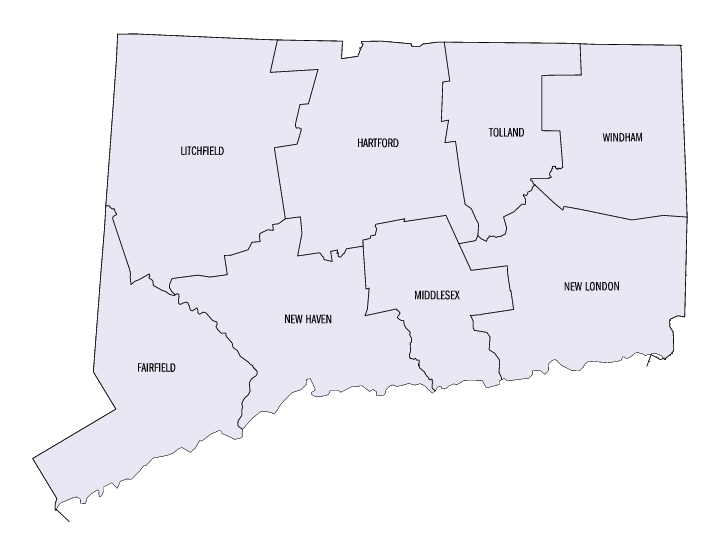
Connecticut counties (clickable map)

This is a list of properties and districts listed on the National Register of Historic Places in Connecticut. There are more than 1,500 listed sites in Connecticut. All 8 counties in Connecticut have listings on the National Register.

Fourteen of the sites are among historic sites along the route of French general Rochambeau's army in 1781 and 1782.

Contents: Counties and municipalities in Connecticut

Fairfield (city of Bridgeport | town of Greenwich | city of Stamford) | Hartford (city of Hartford | town of Southington | town of West Hartford | town of Windsor) | Litchfield | Middlesex (city of Middletown) | New Haven (city of New Haven) | New London | Tolland | Windham

This National Park Service list is complete through NPS recent listings posted June 6, 2026.

== Current listings by county ==
The following are approximate tallies of current listings by county. These counts are based on entries in the National Register Information Database as of April 24, 2008 and new weekly listings posted since then on the National Register of Historic Places web site. There are frequent additions to the listings and occasional delistings and the counts here are approximate and not official. New entries are added to the official Register on a weekly basis. Also, the counts in this table exclude boundary increase and decrease listings which modify the area covered by an existing property or district and which carry a separate National Register reference number. The numbers of NRHP listings in each county are documented by tables in each of the individual county list-articles.

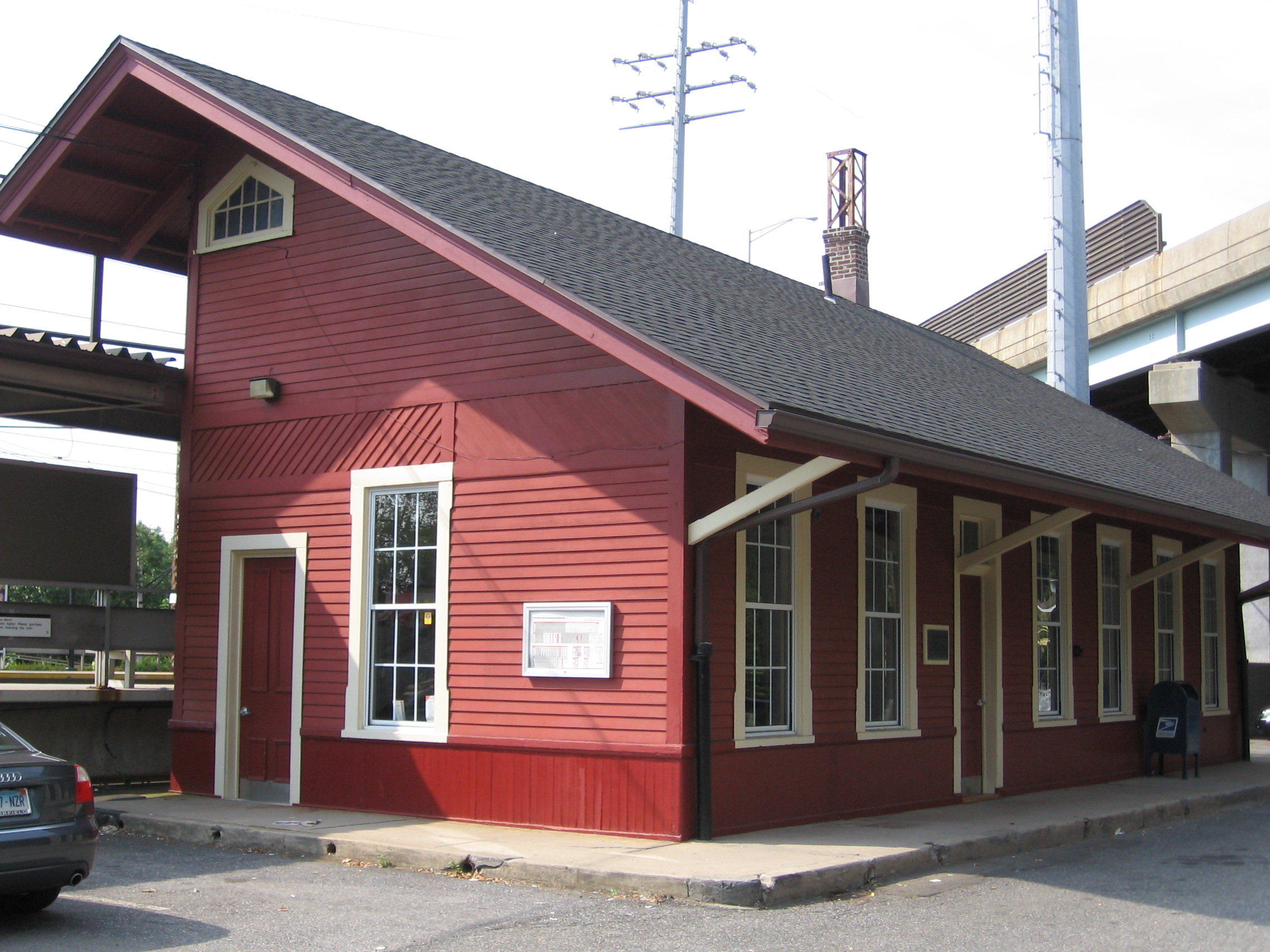
Cos Cob Railroad Station

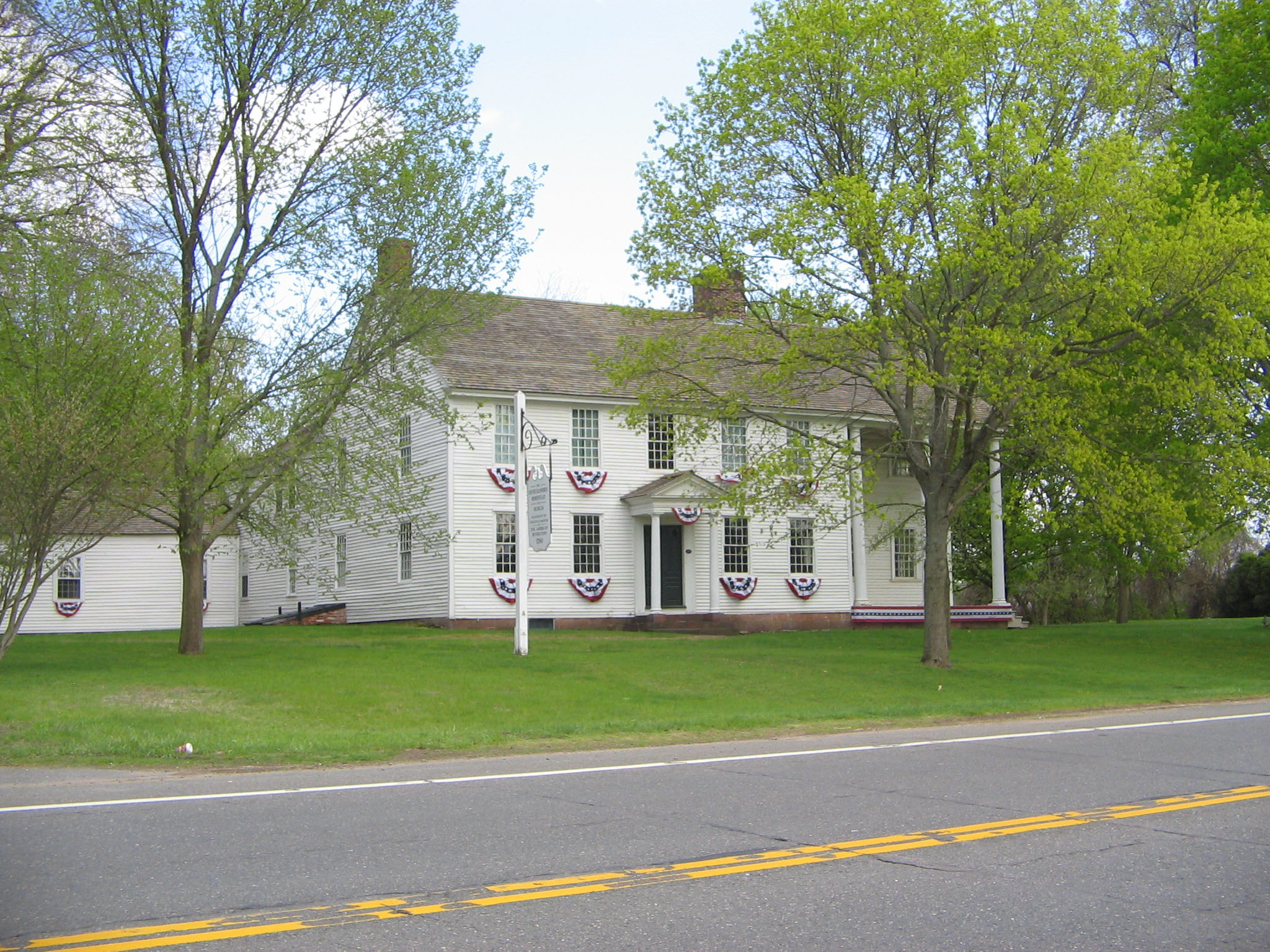
Oliver Ellsworth Homestead

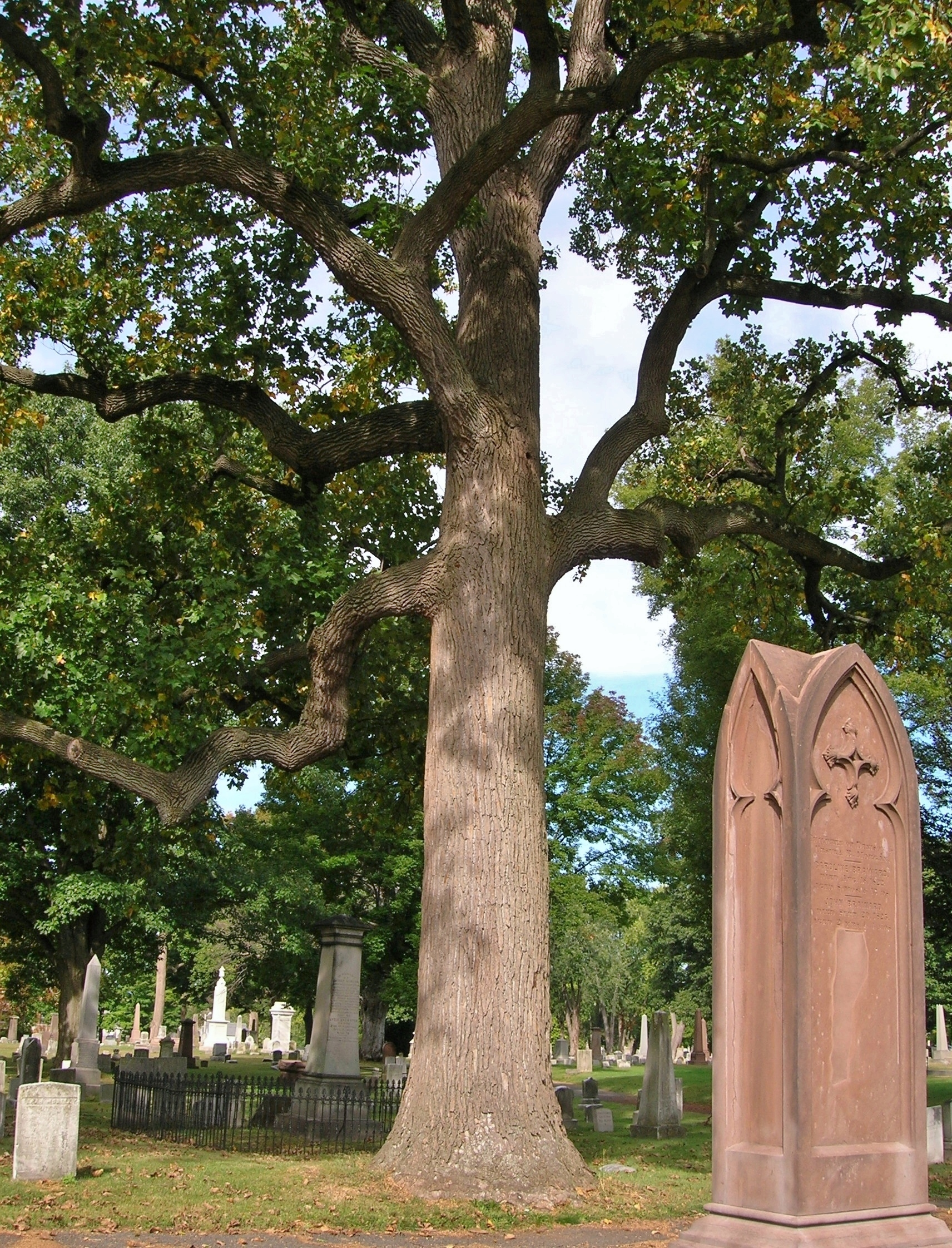
Old North Cemetery, Hartford, CT

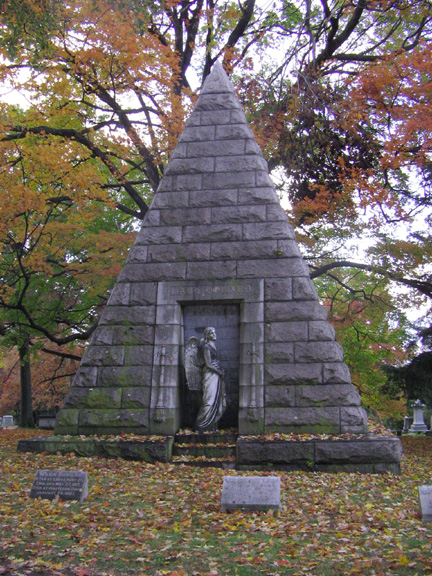
Cedar Hill Cemetery, Hartford, Connecticut

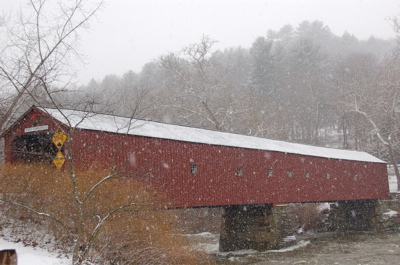
West Cornwall Covered Bridge

	County	# of Sites
1.1	Fairfield: Bridgeport	57
1.2	Fairfield: Greenwich	35
1.3	Fairfield: Stamford	36
1.4	Fairfield: Other	174
	Fairfield: Duplicates	(2)
	Fairfield: Total	300
2.1	Hartford: Hartford (city)	146
2.2	Hartford: Southington	41
2.3	Hartford: West Hartford	32
2.4	Hartford: Windsor	41
2.5	Hartford: Other	191
	Hartford: Duplicates	(10)
	Hartford: Total	441
3	Litchfield	176
4.1	Middlesex: Middletown	36
4.2	Middlesex: Other	92
	Middlesex: Total	128
5.1	New Haven: New Haven (city)	71
5.2	New Haven: Other	210
	New Haven: Duplicates	(3)
	New Haven: Total	278
6	New London	207
7	Tolland	52
8	Windham	86
(duplicates)		(12)
TOTAL		1,656

== See also ==
- List of bridges on the National Register of Historic Places in Connecticut
- List of historical societies in Connecticut
- List of National Historic Landmarks in Connecticut
