= Hargreaves (crater) =

Crater on the Moon

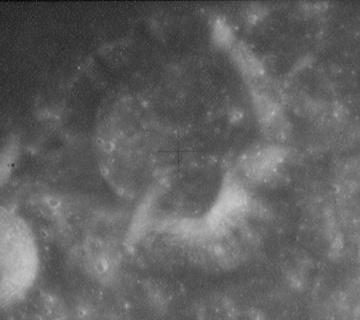
- Apollo 15 Mapping Camera image
- Coordinates: 2.2°S 64.0°E
- Diameter: 16 km
- Depth: Unknown
- Colongitude: 296° at sunrise
- Eponym: Frederick J. Hargreaves

Hargreaves is a lunar impact crater that lies in the eastern part of the Moon, to the east of the Mare Fecunditatis. It is located to the west of the crater Maclaurin, and was previously designated Maclaurin S before being given a name by the IAU in 1979. Just to the southeast is Morley, and to the west is Webb.

This crater has nearly merged with the larger Maclaurin H to the north, and the interior of both formations has been flooded by lava. As a result, Hargreaves is now an amphitheater-like formation with a wide gap in the northern rim. There is a slight notch in the southern rim, and a small craterlet is attached to the western outer rim.
