= Frederick Hargreaves =

Frederick Hargreaves may refer to:

- Fred Hargreaves (1858–1897), English footballer and cricketer
- Frederick James Hargreaves (1891–1970), British astronomer and optician
