= Morley House =

Morley House may refer to:

== Canada ==
- Morley House, a modern-style house in Aylmer, Quebec designed by James Strutt

== England ==
- Morley Manor, Derbyshire
- Morley House, the building of the Junior School of Lewes Old Grammar School in Lewes, East Sussex
- Morley Old Hall, near Norwich, in Norfolk, a Grade I-listed manor house
- Saltram House, Plympton, Plymouth, former home to the Earls of Morley

== United States ==
- Edward W. Morley House, West Hartford, Connecticut, listed on the NRHP in Hartford County, Connecticut
- W.G. Morley House, Bloomfield Hills, Michigan, designed by Marcus Burrowes
- Lewis Morley House, Painesville, Ohio, listed on the NRHP in Lake County, Ohio
- Raymond-Morley House, Austin, Texas, listed on the NRHP in Travis County, Texas
