= First Telephone Exchange =

Former historic site in New Haven, Connecticut

- Former U.S. National Historic Landmark
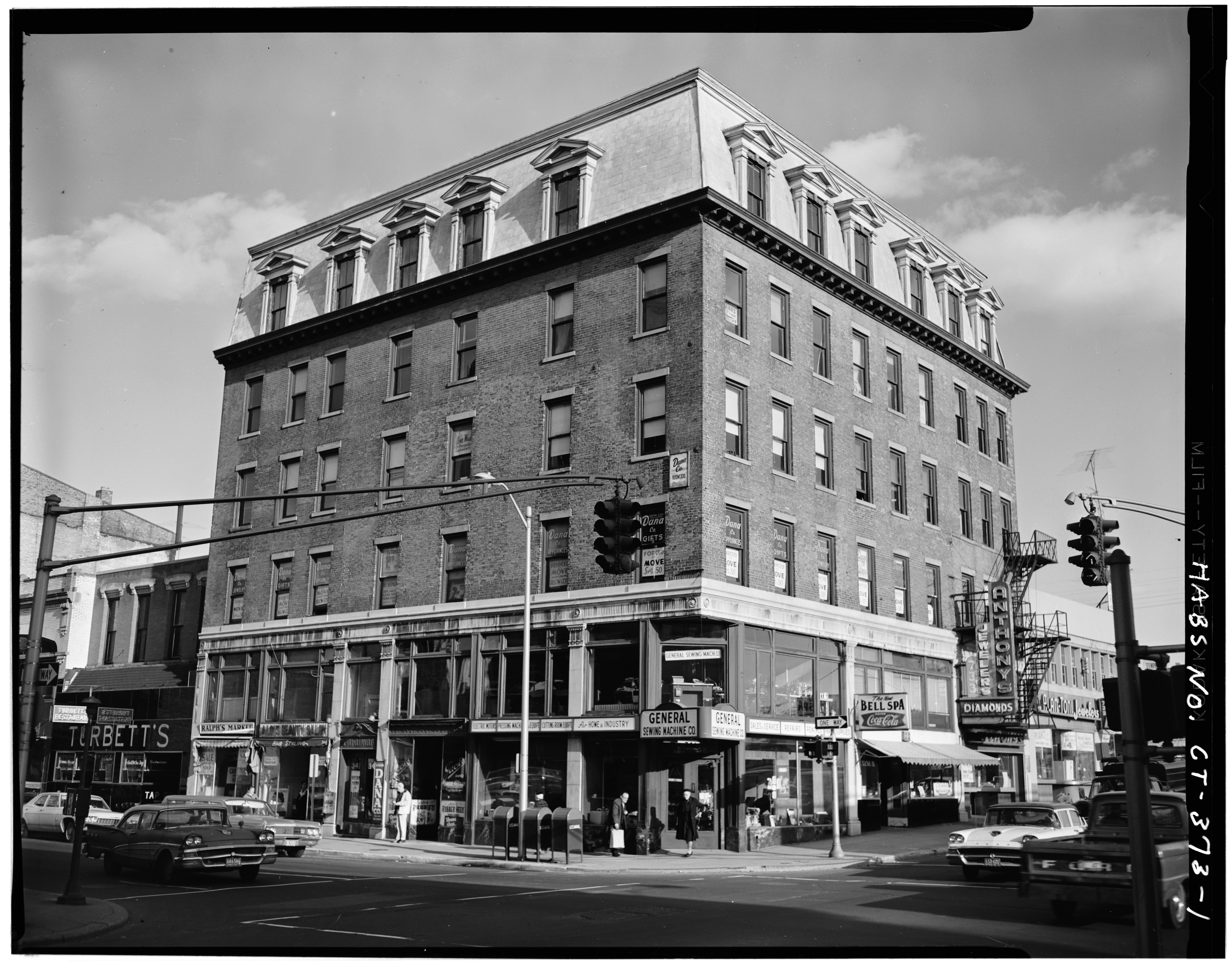
- The site of the First Telephone Exchange in 1973
- Location: New Haven, Connecticut
- Demolished: 1973

Significant dates
- Added to NRHP: October 15, 1966
- Removed from NRHP: 1973

The First Telephone Exchange was a historic site located in New Haven, Connecticut, notable for being the site of the world's first commercial telephone exchange. The exchange was established by George W. Coy, proprietor of the District Telephone Company of New Haven, in 1878. Coy had built the world's first commercial telephone switchboard, and with investors Herrick P. Frost and Walter Lewis, had established the District Telephone Company of New Haven in January 1878. The company soon grew quickly, servicing much of southern New England. In 1882, the company renamed to Southern New England Telephone (SNET). The company remained independent until it was acquired by SBC Communications in 1998.

The site of the First Telephone Exchange, which was located in New Haven's Boardman Building, was listed as a National Historic Site on January 29, 1964. In 1968, the New Haven Redevelopment Commission acquired the building with the intentions of tearing it down and building a parking garage in its place. The building was demolished in 1973 and the site was stripped of its NRHP designation that same year.

== History ==
Mechanic and inventor George Willard Coy attended a lecture by Alexander Graham Bell at New Haven's Skiff Opera House on April 27, 1877. Coy, who had developed the world's first commercial telephone switchboard, was inspired by Bell's discussion of a telephone exchange for business and trade. On November 3, 1877, Coy applied for (and received) a franchise from the Bell Telephone Company for New Haven and Middlesex Counties, Connecticut on the agreement that Bell would own 35% of the company. Coy partnered with investors Walter Lewis, who was the superintendent of the New Haven Clock Company, and businessman Herrick Frost to establish the District Telephone Company of New Haven on January 15, 1878. On January 28, operating from the Boardman Building in New Haven, the company established the world's first telephone exchange. The company entered operation with just 21 customers, but by February 21, the number of subscribers had reached 50. On February 21, the company made history by printing what is now known as the first ever telephone directory.

The company soon grew quickly; by 1880 it had obtained the rights to serve all of Connecticut and Western Massachusetts. The company was renamed to Connecticut Telephone, which was changed to Southern New England Telephone (SNET) in 1882. SNET continued to operate in Southern New England for over 100 years before being acquired by SBC Communications in 1986. SBC would later acquire AT&T in 2005.

The Boardman Building was designated a National Historic Landmark on January 29, 1964. By 1968, the Boardman Building (which by this point was known as the Metropolitan Building) was acquired by the New Haven Redevelopment Agency with the intention of demolishing it and building a parking garage in its place. The Metropolitan Building was ultimately demolished in 1973, and its NRHP listing was removed that same year.

== See also ==
- Southern New England Telephone Company
- List of National Historic Landmarks in Connecticut
