= George Willard Coy =

American inventor, mechanic and entrepreneur

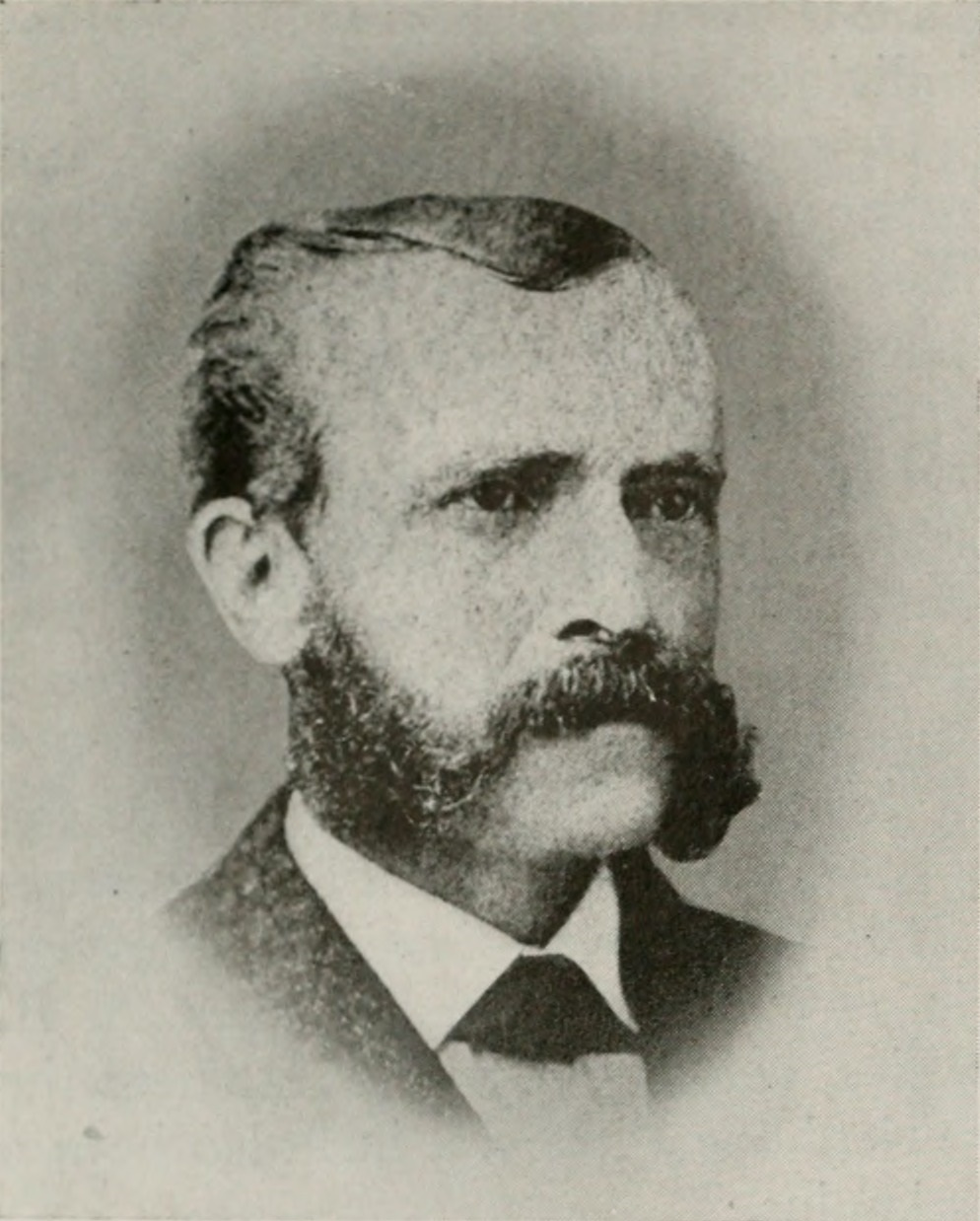
Coy in the Bell Telephone Magazine

George Willard Coy (November 13, 1836 – January 15 or 23, 1915) was an American mechanic, inventor and entrepreneur. He ran the first commercial telephone exchange in 1878 and was involved in the production of the first telephone directory.

== Early life ==
Coy was born on November 13, 1836, in Freedom, Maine. He was a first sergeant in Company D, 56th Regiment Massachusetts Volunteer Infantry of the Union Army during the American Civil War.

== Career ==
On January 28, 1878, the first telephone switchboard went into operation in New Haven, Connecticut. It was set up by Coy, Herrick P. Frost, and Walter Lewis and with an investment of $600; the switching equipment was developed and built by Coy. The company was named District Telephone Company of New Haven. Coy took over the switching operation and thus became the world's first operator; Frost was the first salaried operator. Eight telephone lines were available to the company's initial 21 customers. After Lewis left, Coy and Frost sold a blocking minority to the investor as capital requirements increased. The Southern New England Telephone Company was formed from the company in 1882.

Coy was involved in the publication of the world's first telephone directory on February 21, 1878. It consisted of a single sheet of paper and contained 50 names. It was produced by Coy and the District Telephone Company financiers.

== Death and legacy ==
Coy died on January 15 or 23, 1915, in Revere, Massachusetts.
