= Mashantucket Pequot Reservation Archeological District =

Archaeological site in Connecticut, United States

- U.S. National Register of Historic Places
- U.S. National Historic Landmark District
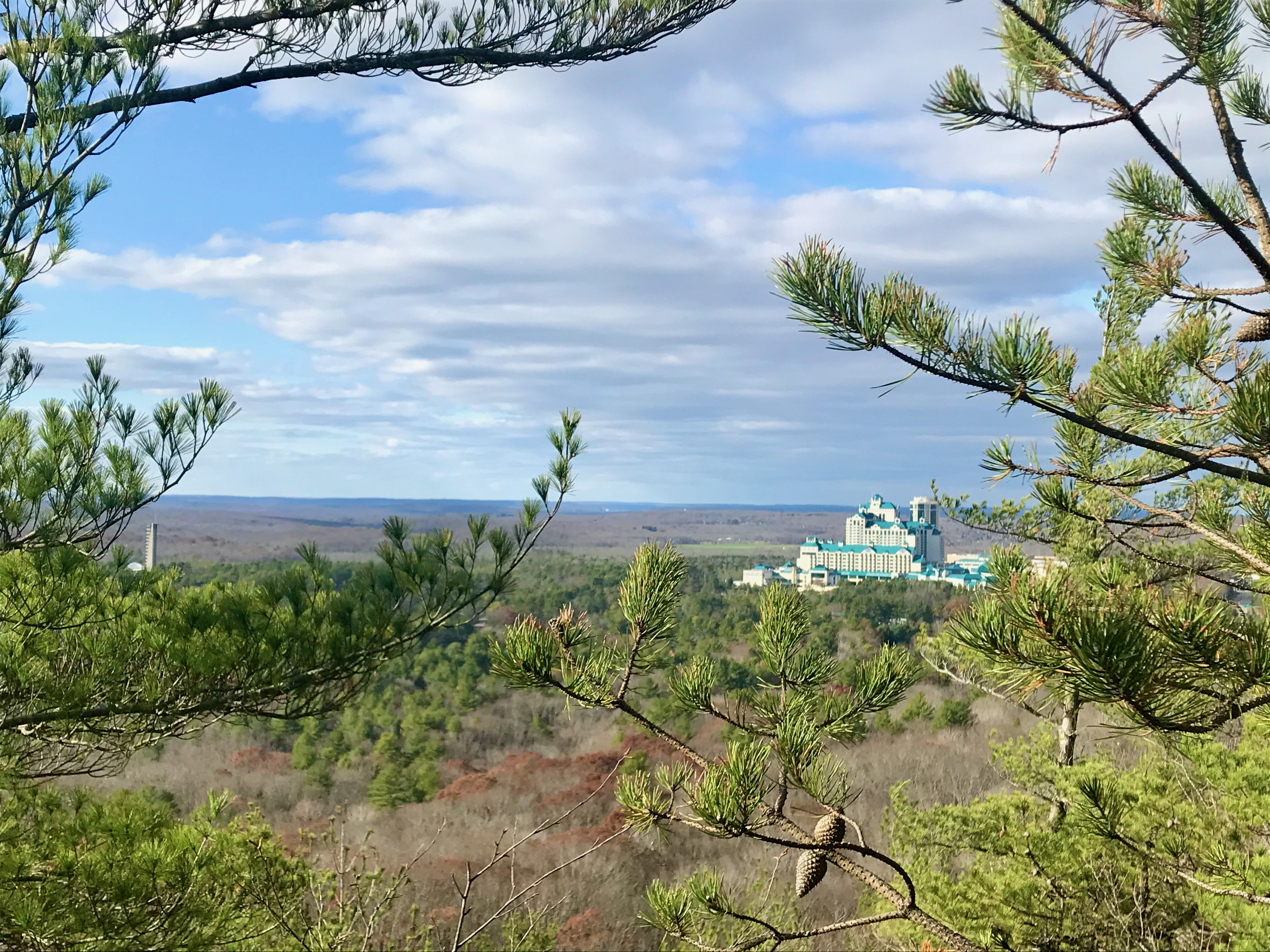
- View over the reservation from Lantern Hill
- Location: Ledyard, Connecticut
- Area: 1,638 acres (6.63 km^{2})
- NRHP reference No.: 86001323

Significant dates
- Added to NRHP: June 11, 1986
- Designated NHLD: April 12, 1993

The Mashantucket Pequot Reservation Archeological District is a historic district in the northeast corner of the town of Ledyard, Connecticut. The district includes nearly 1,638 acres (6.63 km^{2}) of archeologically sensitive land in the northern portion of the uplands historically called Wawarramoreke by the federally recognized Mashantucket Pequot Tribe. It is within territory documented as Pequot land in the earliest-known surviving map (1614) of the region. The district was listed on the National Register of Historic Places in 1986 and was declared a National Historic Landmark in 1993.

The district includes a significant portion of lands historically occupied by the Pequot. In 1666 the Connecticut Colony set aside about 3,000 acres (12 km^{2}) of land as Pequot territory. Over the next two centuries the Pequot population dwindled, and in 1856 the state reduced the reservation size to 216 acres (0.87 km^{2}).

In the 1970s the tribe formally filed a land claim suit for the recovery of its land, eventually recovering more than 2,000 acres (8.1 km^{2}) under a settlement affirmed by an act of Congress. Archaeological investigations into these lands have identified more than fifteen sites of interest. The tribe considers the entire reservation to be archaeologically sensitive, requiring investigation before any significant construction projects take place on its territory.

Materials found at sites investigated on the reservation include aboriginal lithic and quartz stonework, and a variety of colonial trade items believed to date as far back as the 16th century. While the earliest village sites found provide little evidence about housing, by the 18th century the Pequots were documented as living in both traditional wigwam-style structures, as well as European-style wood-frame houses. The archeological evidence of the villages shows they included large (3-4 acre) plots of farmsteads surrounded by stone walls (the walls being one place where objects of interest are often found).

== See also ==
- List of National Historic Landmarks in Connecticut
- National Register of Historic Places listings in New London County, Connecticut
