= Charles H. Norton House =

Historic house in Connecticut, United States

- U.S. National Register of Historic Places
- U.S. National Historic Landmark
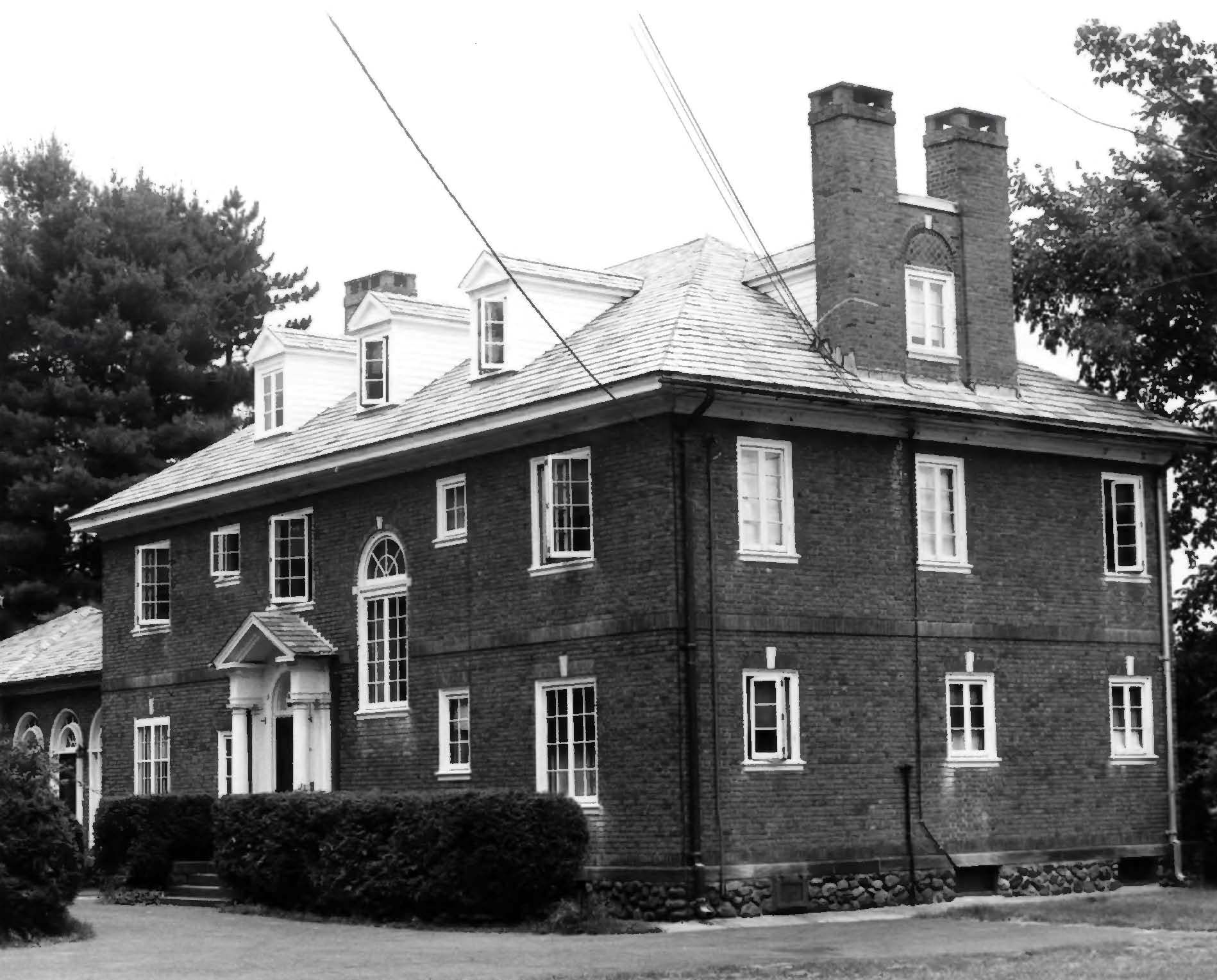
- Charles H. Norton House in 1975

- Location within Connecticut Location within the United States
- Location: 132 Redstone Hill, Plainville, Connecticut
- Coordinates: 41°39′32.19″N 72°53′5.83″W
- Built: 1922
- Architectural style: Colonial Revival
- NRHP reference No.: 76002139

Significant dates
- Added to NRHP: May 11, 1976
- Designated NHL: May 11, 1976

The Charles H. Norton House, also known as Sharpenhoe, is a historic house at 132 Redstone Hill in Plainville, Connecticut. Built in 1922, this brick Georgian Revival house was the home of inventor and machinist Charles Hotchkiss Norton (1851–1942), a Plainville native, from 1922 until his death. The house was designated a National Historic Landmark in 1976 for its association with Norton, who designed heavy-duty precision grinding machines important for development of the automobile industry.

== Description and history ==
Sharpenhoe, as it was called by Norton, is a two-story brick structure with a hip roof and three chimneys. The main facade is six bays in width, with windows of varying sizes in most of the bays. The right-center bay on both floors is taken up by a single double-casement window with a round-arch top, while the first floor of the left-center bay has the main entrance. The door is topped by a half-round transom window, and is sheltered by a gable-roof portico supported by columns and pilasters. Three gable-roof dormers pierce the front of the roof, while another dormer is worked between the two chimneys on the right side, with round-arch decorative brickwork. The building is not of particular architectural significance; its designer and builder are not known.

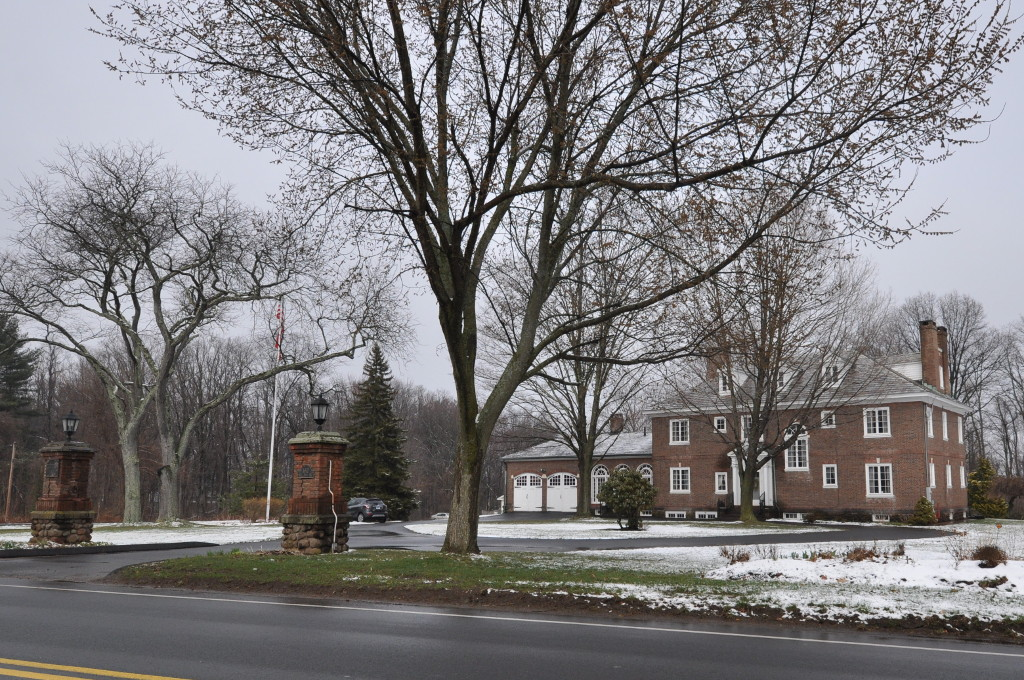
The house in 2018

Charles Norton was born in Plainville to a cabinetmaker in 1851, and apprenticed at the Seth Thomas Clock Company at age 15. He worked there until he was 35, rising to manager, and mastering the principles of the manufacture of interchangeable parts. He was then employed in Providence, Rhode Island at Brown & Sharpe, where he mastered the manufacture of precision grinding equipment. In his later years he applied this expertise broadly to all manner of manufacturing processes, with particular emphasis on the nascent automobile industry in the early decades of the 20th century. Sharpenhoe is the home to which he retired, and where he spent the last 20 years of his life.

== See also ==
- List of National Historic Landmarks in Connecticut
- National Register of Historic Places listings in Hartford County, Connecticut
