= Frederic Remington House =

Historic house in Connecticut, United States

- U.S. National Register of Historic Places
- U.S. National Historic Landmark
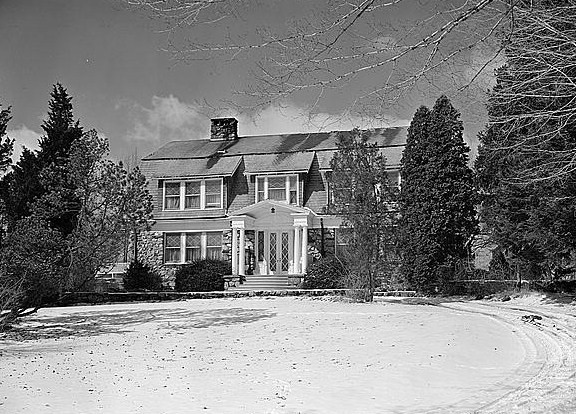
- Frederick Remington House

- Location within Connecticut Location within the United States
- Location: 36 Oak Knoll Road, Ridgefield, Connecticut
- Coordinates: 41°17′5″N 73°31′0″W
- Area: 45 acres (18 ha)
- Built: 1909
- Architect: Frederic Remington
- NRHP reference No.: 66000880

Significant dates
- Added to NRHP: October 15, 1966
- Designated NHL: December 21, 1965

The Frederic Remington House is a historic house at 36 Oak Knoll Road in Ridgefield, Connecticut. A National Historic Landmark, it was the home of the painter and sculptor Frederic Remington (1861–1909) in the last few months of his life. Remington and his wife Eva designed the two-story gambrel-roofed, fieldstone-and-shingle house. He produced some of his finest work in the house including the sculpture The Stampede and the painting The Love Call. The house was declared a National Historic Landmark in 1965.

== Description and history ==
Frederic Remington (1861-1909) lived for many years in New Rochelle, New York, working as an illustrator, sculptor, and writer. He produced iconic works of American art, particularly noted for their themes of the American West. His corpus of work includes more than 2,700 artworks, many of which were published in magazines and newspapers, and 142 books, including eight he wrote. In early 1909 he and his wife purchased 45 acres (18 ha) of land in Ridgefield, Connecticut, and oversaw the construction of a home and studio. During the construction, Remington continued to work, creating a number of significant works. Although he had major plans for life in Ridgefield, he died of acute appendicitis a few months after the house was completed.

The main house is a 2 1/2-story gambrel-roofed wood-frame structure with a stone facade, and clapboarded sides and back. The front has three large shed-roof dormers, and has bands of three sash windows flanking its main entrance, which is sheltered by a columned portico. The house has a central hall plan, with Remington's studio in the rear left of the structure. It is a high-ceilinged room with large windows onto the backyard, and has a large fieldstone chimney. During Remington's life the room was cluttered with artifacts of the American West.

In addition to the main house, the property includes a cluster of outbuildings, which were also designed and built by the Remingtons. They include a cow barn, chicken coop, and shed, as well as a caretaker's cottage and a carriage house that has been adapted for residential use.

== See also ==
- List of National Historic Landmarks in Connecticut
- National Register of Historic Places listings in Fairfield County, Connecticut
