= Born (crater) =

Lunar crater

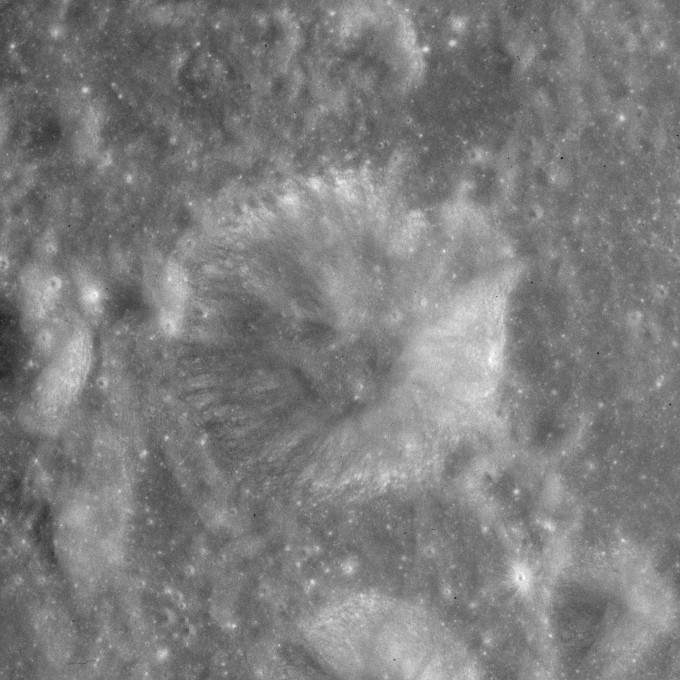
- Apollo 15 Mapping Camera image
- Coordinates: 6.0°S 66.8°E
- Diameter: 15.07 km (9.36 mi)
- Depth: Unknown
- Colongitude: 354° at sunrise
- Eponym: Max Born

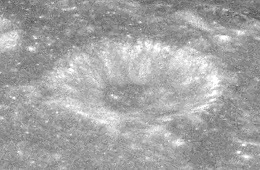
Oblique view of Born from Apollo 8

Born is a small lunar impact crater located near the eastern edge of the Moon, to the northeast of the prominent crater Langrenus. This crater is circular and generally cup-shaped, with dark patches stretching from the midpoint toward the northeastern rim. It is otherwise undistinguished.

This crater is named after German physicist Max Born (1882-1970), the 1954 Nobel laurette in physics with Walther Bothe. Its designation was officially adopted by the International Astronomical Union in 1979. This feature was formerly identified as Maclaurin Y, a satellite feature of Maclaurin crater which lies to the north.
