= Maclaurin (crater) =

Crater on the Moon

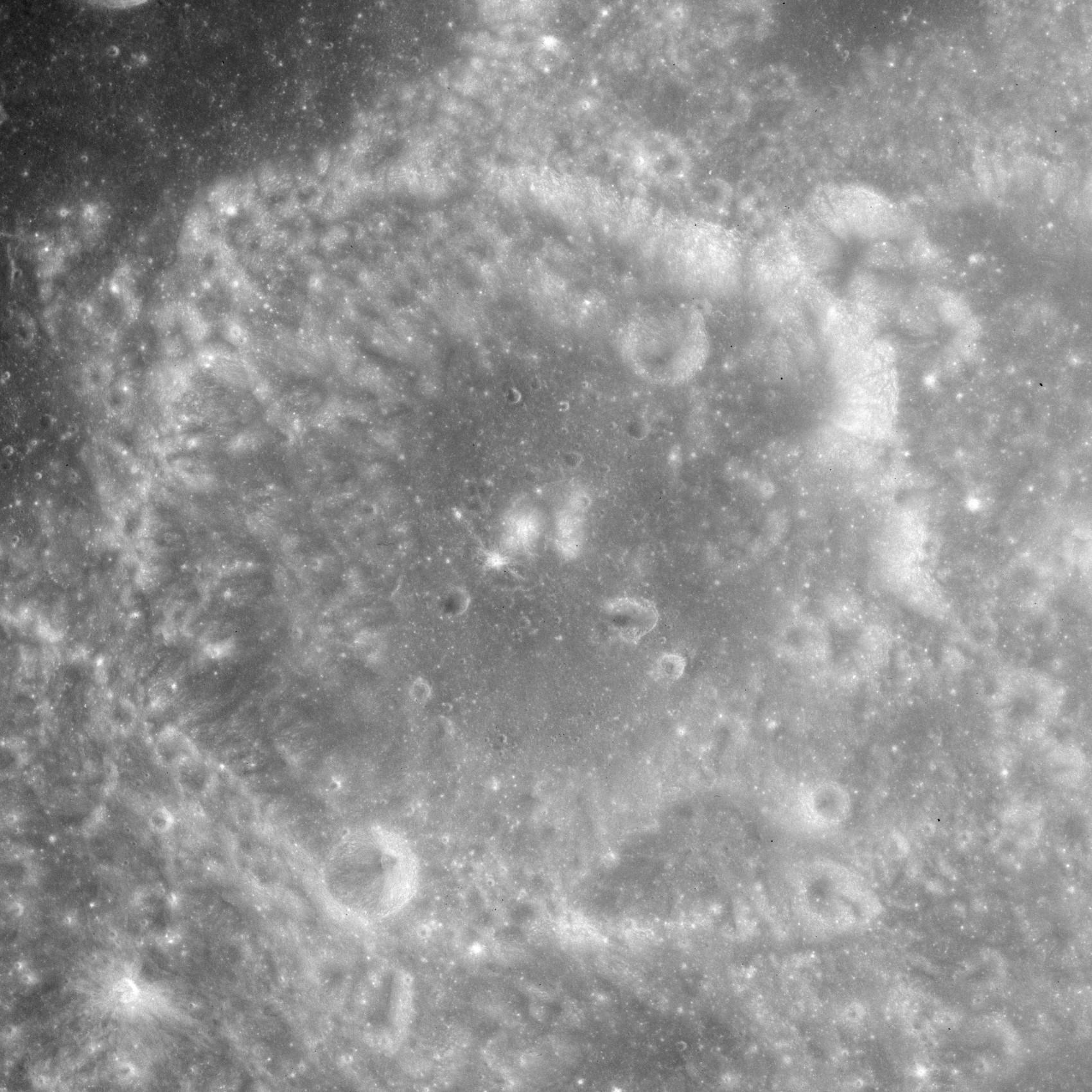
- Apollo 15 Mapping Camera image
- Coordinates: 1.9°S 68.0°E
- Diameter: 50 km
- Depth: 3.38 km
- Colongitude: 292° at sunrise
- Eponym: Colin Maclaurin

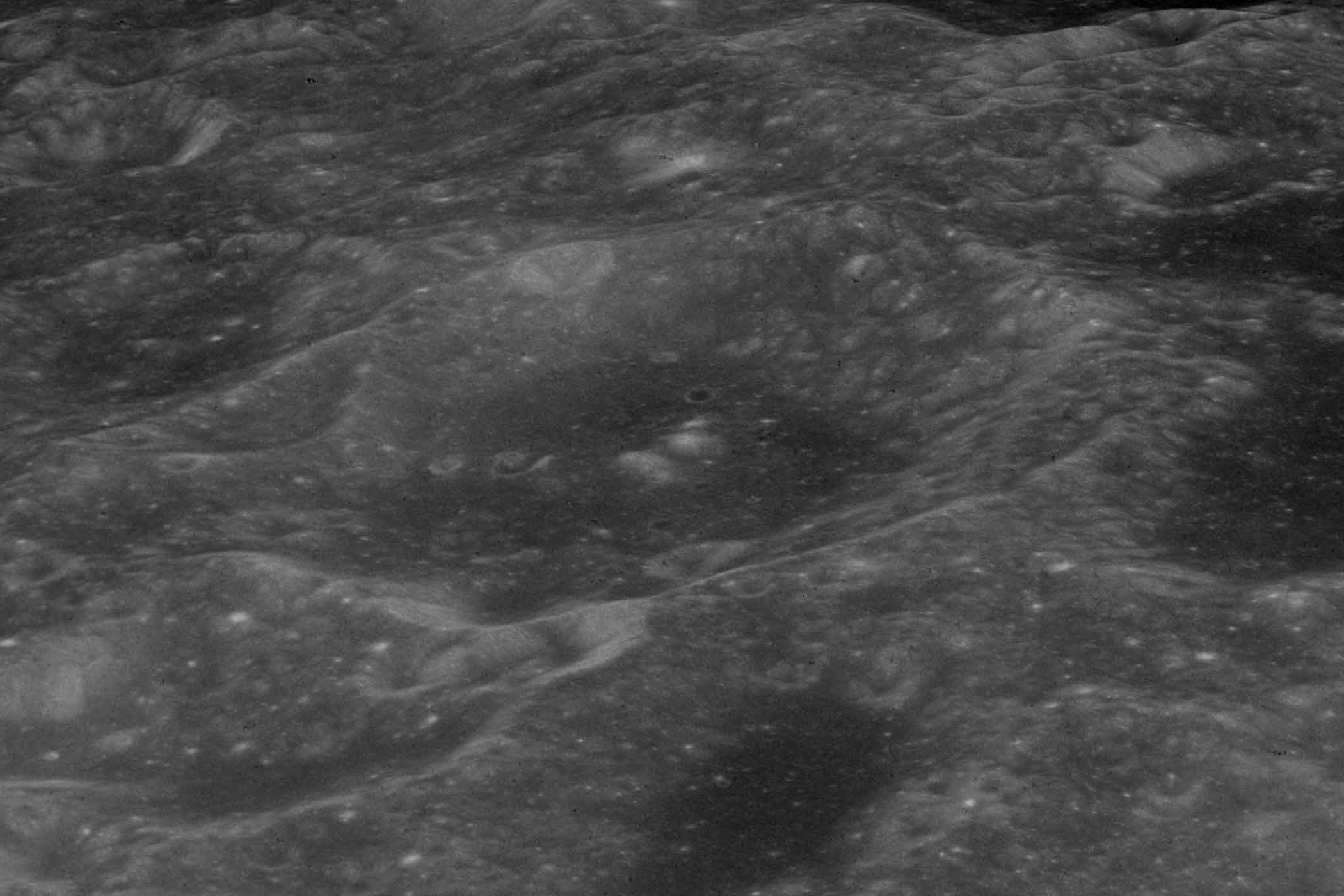
Oblique view from Apollo 10

Maclaurin is a lunar impact crater that is located in the eastern part of the Moon's near side. It lies just to the southeast of the small Mare Spumans, and to the northeast of the prominent crater Langrenus. To the east-southeast is Gilbert.

The rim of this crater is perhaps unusual for the number of lesser craters attached to the exterior. Along the northern rim are the lava-flooded Maclaurin O and Maclaurin K. There are also satellite craters along the northeastern, eastern, and southern walls. The only open stretches of rim are along the western side, and a brief stretch to the southeast. The three craters along the southern rim, which include Maclaurin A and Maclaurin N, have intruded into the formation sufficiently to compress and slightly flatten that end of the crater. But overall it retains a generally circular form.

The inner walls cut down to a gently descending slope that extends toward the flattened midsection. The middle portion of the interior floor has been resurfaced, possibly by basaltic lava, leaving a lower albedo patch with a slightly darkened hue. At the midpoint of the crater interior is a low central ridge.

== Satellite craters ==
By convention, these features are identified on lunar maps by placing the letter on the side of the crater midpoint that is closest to Maclaurin.

Maclaurin	Latitude	Longitude	Diameter
A	3.0° S	67.6° E	29 km
B	3.6° S	71.4° E	43 km
C	1.1° S	69.6° E	26 km
D	7.1° S	69.9° E	10 km
E	3.5° S	65.7° E	20 km
G	7.0° S	66.9° E	12 km
H	1.6° S	64.1° E	41 km
J	2.2° S	69.4° E	16 km
K	0.9° S	66.9° E	34 km
L	1.4° S	71.7° E	30 km
M	4.8° S	69.4° E	42 km
N	3.8° S	68.4° E	29 km
O	0.3° S	67.9° E	37 km
P	6.0° S	69.4° E	29 km
T	1.8° S	65.4° E	35 km
U	3.9° S	66.2° E	19 km
W	0.5° N	68.1° E	21 km
X	0.1° S	68.7° E	24 km

The following craters have been renamed by the IAU.

- Maclaurin F — See Von Behring
- Maclaurin R — See Morley
- Maclaurin S — See Hargreaves
- Maclaurin Y — See Born
