= Fish Church =

- First Presbyterian Church
- U.S. National Register of Historic Places
- U.S. National Historic Landmark
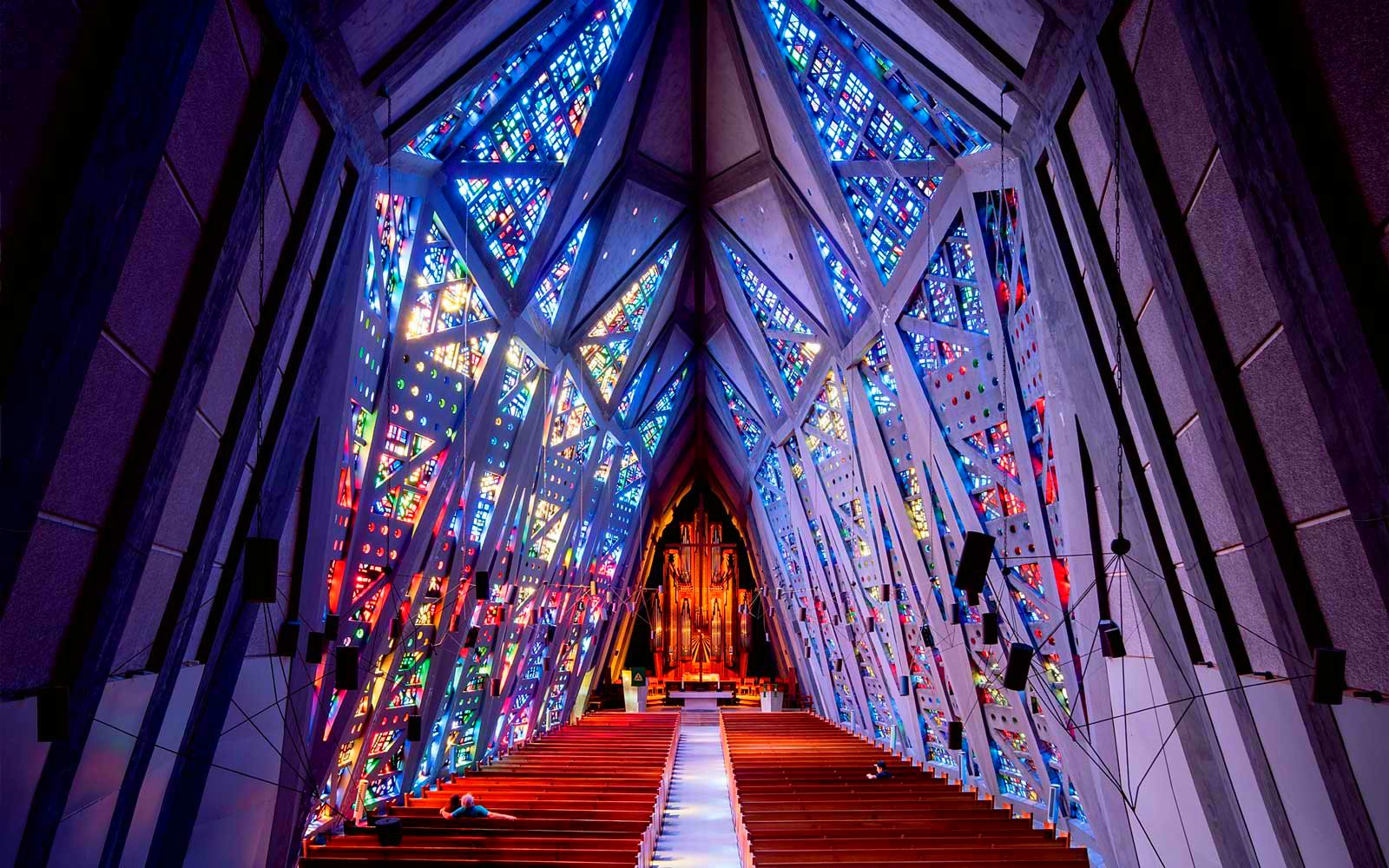
- Stained glass interior of the Fish Church in 2015

- Location within Connecticut Location within the United States
- Location: 1101 Bedford Street, Stamford, Connecticut
- Coordinates: 41°3′47″N 73°32′19″W
- Area: 6.58 acres (2.66 ha)
- Built: 1958
- Architect: Wallace Harrison
- Architectural style: Modern
- NRHP reference No.: 100006271

Significant dates
- Added to NRHP: January 13, 2021
- Designated NHL: January 13, 2021

The First Presbyterian Church of Stamford is a church in Stamford, Connecticut designed by architect Wallace K. Harrison. Nicknamed the Fish Church for its unusual shape, the interior of the church contains a shimmering stained glass 60-foot-tall (18 m) nave. it is a unique example of modernist architecture, and an architectural landmark. Its 260-foot-tall (79 m) Maguire Memorial Tower holds a 56-bell carillon. The building was designated a National Historic Landmark for its architecture in 2021, and the church is an active congregation of the Presbyterian Church (USA).

== History and architecture ==
The original First Presbyterian Church of Stamford was a wooden structure located at 90 Broad Street from 1854 to 1882 when it burned down. It was replaced with a stone edifice, enlarged in 1920, which was used until 1958. In 1954, the congregation voted to relocate to its present location at 1101 Bedford Street.

Designed by Wallace K. Harrison, the new sanctuary was dedicated in March 1958. Its shape has been likened to that of a fish- a symbol used in early Christianity. The fish shape is apparent both in the profile and in the floor plan of the structure. Enhancing the unique shape of the church are the enormous stained glass windows in the sanctuary, which contain more than 20,000 pieces of faceted glass. These windows depict the story of the Crucifixion (on the right side), and the Resurrection (on the left). A 32-foot-high (9.8 m) cross faced with wood from the Canterbury Cathedral in England, dominates the Chancel. The church originally had an electronic organ, now replaced with a large Visser-Rowland pipe organ.

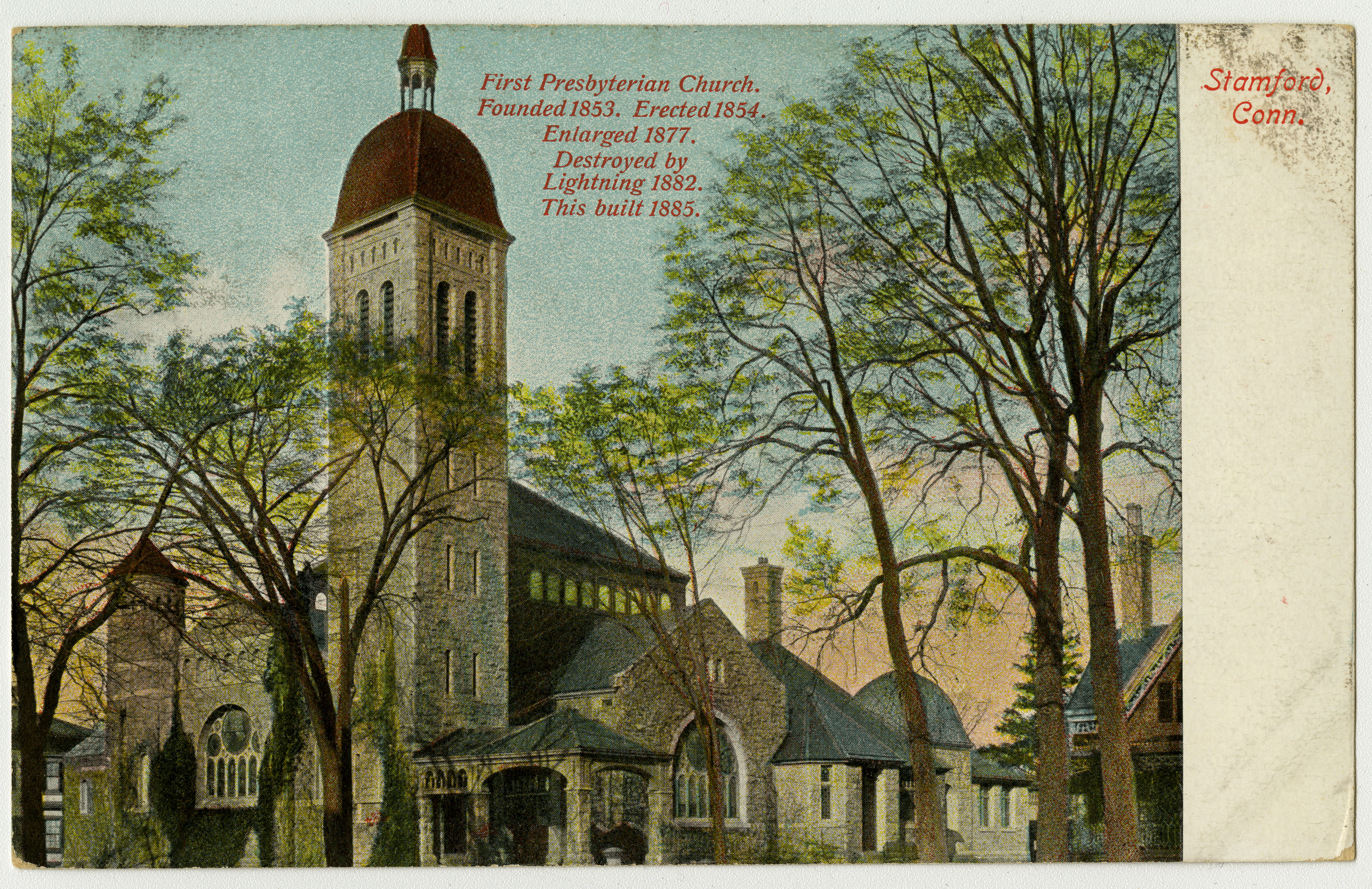
The stone church built in 1885

The stone wall along Bedford Street contains a series of tablets which recognize significant events, institutions, and individuals in the history of Stamford, particularly those with a religious impact, from 1641 to 1975. The Memorial Walk leading from Fellowship Hall (a multi-purpose space which includes a kitchen and stage) to the main entrance of the Sanctuary, has more than 100 stones, each representing an important figure in the Judeo/Christian tradition from the days of Abraham to the present. The corridor outside the chapel contains a collection of over 100 stones from sites of historical Christian significance, gathered during the world travels of former pastor Dr. George Stewart. The stone wall bears the inscription: "from far places where other believers turned not their back."

The church is home to a 56-bell carillon, now housed in the Maguire Memorial Tower. It was originally of 36 bells and called the Nestle Carillon, as the Nestle Corporation was headquartered in Stamford during World War II.

== See also ==
- First Presbyterian Church
- List of carillons
- List of National Historic Landmarks in Connecticut
