= Bingham Pond Bog =

- Location within Connecticut
- Location: Litchfield County, Connecticut
- Nearest city: Salisbury
- Coordinates: 42°01′13″N 73°27′59″W
- Area: 85 acres (34 ha)
- Designated: 1973

Bingham Pond Bog is a rare undisturbed cold northern black spruce bog, highly unusual in that it lacks the usual sphagnum moss associated with bogs. It is located near Salisbury, Connecticut, United States. It was designated a National Natural Landmark in May 1973.

The Crimson-ringed Whiteface (Leucorrhinia glacialis) dragonflies are known to be present.
