= Beckley Bog =

Natural area in the U.S. state of Connecticut

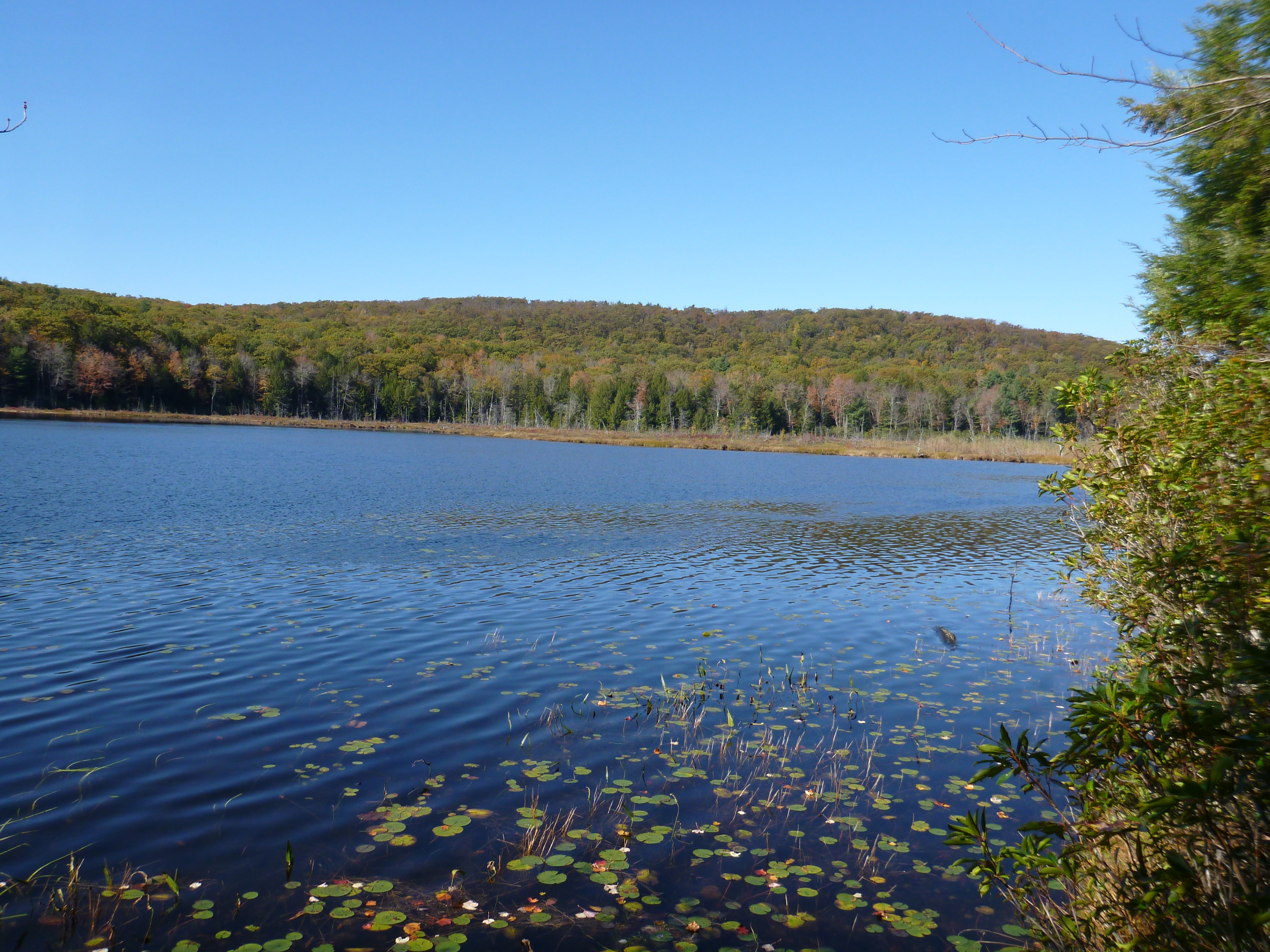
- Beckley Bog in 2012

- Location within Connecticut
- Location: Litchfield County, Connecticut
- Nearest city: Norfolk
- Coordinates: 41.96889°N 73.16222°W
- Area: 12 acres (4.9 ha)
- Established: 1957
- Governing body: The Nature Conservancy

U.S. National Natural Landmark
- Designated: 1977

Beckley Bog is a sphagnum-heath-black spruce bog located near Norfolk in Litchfield County, Connecticut. It is the southernmost sphagnum heath bog in New England. The peat moss is over 51 feet deep. It was declared a National Natural Landmark in May 1977.

It was purchased by The Nature Conservancy and the Conservation and Research Foundation in 1957. It was the first purchase by the Conservancy in Connecticut and is now part of the Northwest Highlands group of preserves.
