= Frederick James Hargreaves =

British astronomer and optician

Frederick James Hargreaves (10 February 1891 – 4 September 1970) was a British astronomer and optician.

He was considered the foremost optician in Britain, and was noted for his skill in mirror making and other optics for astronomical telescopes. He also made a series of observations and drawings of the turbulence in the belts and zones of Jupiter's atmosphere.

He served as president of the British Astronomical Association (1942–1944).

He partnered to create the firm Cox Hargreaves and Thompson, with first premises under the embankment of the mainline station near Preston Park, Brighton, Sussex. Later, moving to the much better environment for really accurate grinding and surface continuity at the large tunnel layout (Deep Level Air Raid Shelter No. 4), in the grounds of Cane Hill Asylum, Coulsdon, Surrey, from 1952 to 1970. Cut deep into a chalk hill, these brick-lined tunnels had an all-year round constant temperature and absolutely no vibration. Mirrors tested at point of manufacture and later using modern testing equipment have shown Hargreaves' hand-cut mirrors to be accurate to an average of 3 wavelengths of sodium light.

Hargreaves trained telescope-maker Norman Fisher (1936–1994) in mirror making at the Cane Hill tunnels. The Norman Fisher Observatory is sited at Kenley, Surrey.

== Awards and honors ==
- Awarded the Jackson-Gwilt Medal in 1938.
- The crater Hargreaves on the Moon is named after him.

== See also ==
- List of astronomical instrument makers

== Bibliography ==
- The size of the universe, 1948, Penguin Books.
- A Description of a Reflecting Telescope with Unusual Features, Quarterly Journal of the Royal Astronomical Society, 3 (March 1962) 25–30.
- A Home-made Equatorial, The Observatory, 49 (Oct. 1926) 299–302.
- The Northumberland Telescope at Cambridge Observatory, The Observatory 60 (Dec. 1937) 322–325.
- Obituary QJRAS 12 (1971), p.336
- Obituary JBAA 82 (1971), p.43
