= Morley (crater) =

Crater on the Moon

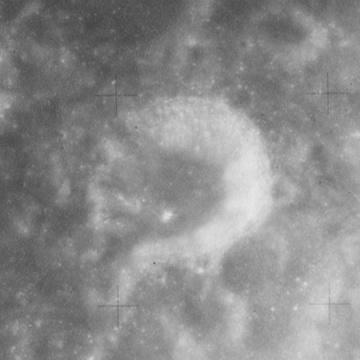
- Apollo 15 Mapping Camera image
- Coordinates: 2.8°S 64.6°E
- Diameter: 14 km
- Depth: Unknown
- Colongitude: 296° at sunrise
- Eponym: Edward W. Morley

Morley is a small lunar impact crater that is located in the eastern part of the Moon's near side, to the east of the Mare Fecunditatis. It was formerly a satellite crater of Maclaurin, being designated Maclaurin R, before being given its current name by the IAU in 1979. Morley lies to the west-southwest of Maclaurin.

This is a small, bowl-shaped crater that is similar to many comparable formations across the lunar surface. The inner walls are symmetrical in appearance and not notably eroded. They slope down to the interior floor, which has a diameter about half that of the entire crater.
