= Oliver Ellsworth Homestead =

Historic house in Connecticut, United States

- U.S. National Register of Historic Places
- U.S. National Historic Landmark
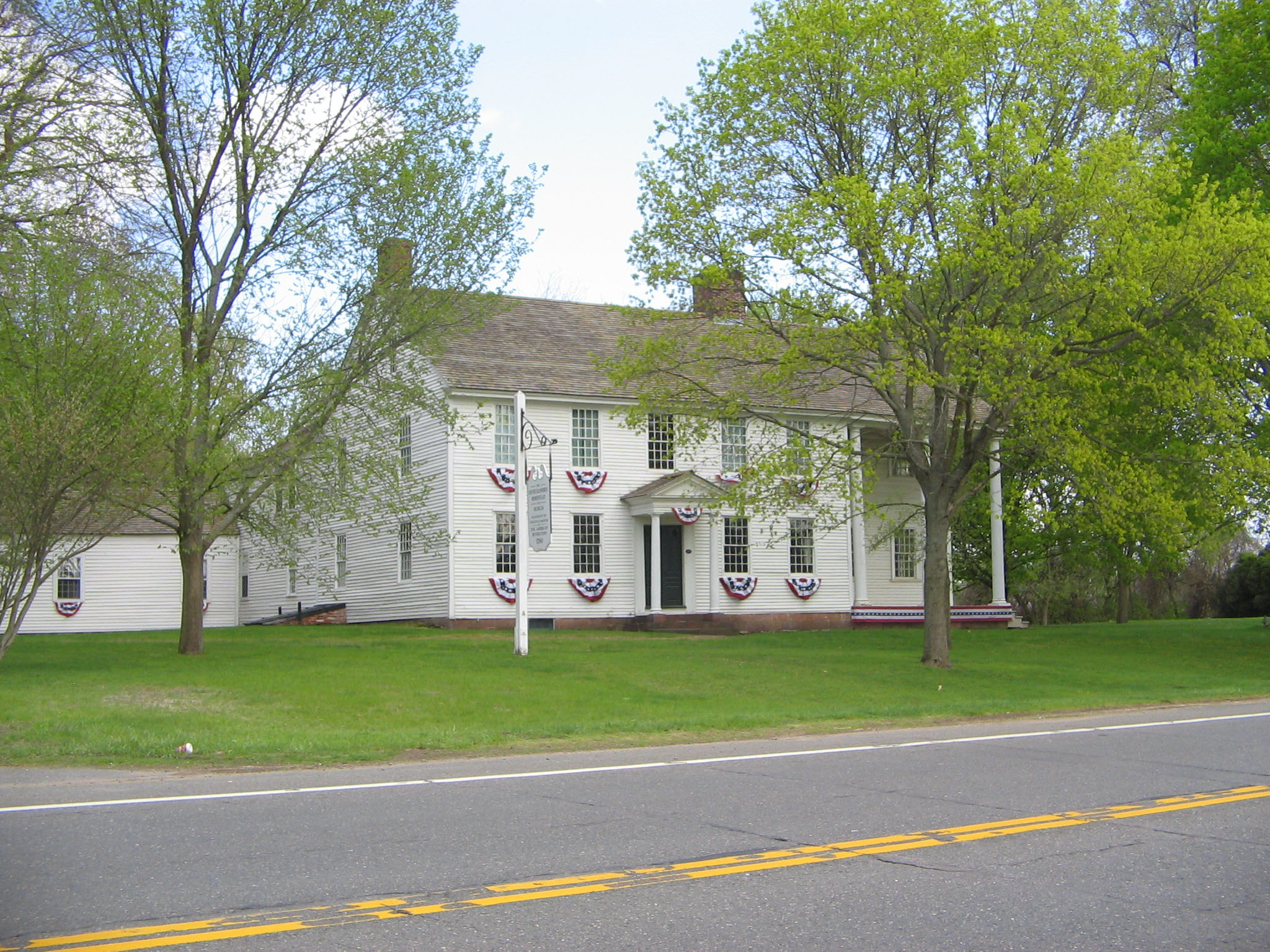

- Location within Connecticut Location within the United States
- Location: 778 Palisado Avenue, Windsor, Connecticut
- Coordinates: 41°52′39.87″N 72°37′31.02″W
- Built: 1781
- Architect: Samuel Denslow; Thomas Hayden
- Architectural style: Georgian
- NRHP reference No.: 70000707

Significant dates
- Added to NRHP: October 06, 1970
- Designated NHL: December 20, 1989

The Oliver Ellsworth Homestead, also known as Elmwood, is a historic house museum at 788 Palisado Avenue in Windsor, Connecticut. Built in 1781, it was the home of the American lawyer and politician Oliver Ellsworth until his death in 1807, and was designated a National Historic Landmark because of this association. A Founding Father of the United States, Ellsworth (1745–1807) helped draft the United States Constitution, served as the third Chief Justice of the United States, and was a United States senator from Connecticut. The house is owned and maintained and operated as a museum by the Connecticut Daughters of the American Revolution, and is open for tours upon request.

== Description and history ==
The Ellsworth House stands in northern Windsor, on the east side of Palisado Avenue (Connecticut Route 159), near its junction with Macktown Road. Palisado Avenue is a historically old road, originally serving as the main north–south route on the west bank of the Connecticut River.

The house is a 2 1/2-story wood-frame structure, with a side-gable roof and clapboarded exterior. Its main facade is five bays wide, with a two-bay extension to the south that is recessed beneath a shared roofline supported by Tuscan columns. The original five-bay block has end chimneys. The main entrance is at its center, sheltered by a 19th-century gabled portico. The interior retains features of the late 19th century, including furnishings and decorative materials associated with Oliver Ellsworth and his family.

A house was built on this site in 1740 by David Ellsworth, and it is in that house that Oliver Ellsworth was raised. Documentary records show that Oliver Ellsworth, having inherited the property, contracted in 1781 for the construction of a new house on the site of the old, which may have reused some of its elements, including the foundation. His family moved in the following year, and it remained his home until his death in 1807. The two-bay extension to the south was added in 1788, although the roofline and Tuscan columns are a 19th-century alteration.

The name Elmwood derives from the thirteen elm trees Ellsworth planted in honor of the Thirteen Colonies. Elmwood was visited by two sitting Presidents: George Washington (on October 21, 1789) and John Adams (October 3, 1799). The house was occupied by the Ellsworth family until 1903 when it was given to the Connecticut Daughters of the American Revolution. The homestead was restored in the late 1980s and early 1990s and is now a museum. The property includes a meeting hall built in the 1930s, which the DAR make available as a function and event space.

The house was listed on the National Register of Historic Places in 1970, and declared a National Historic Landmark in 1989.

== See also ==
- List of National Historic Landmarks in Connecticut
- National Register of Historic Places listings in Windsor, Connecticut
