= Edward W. Morley =

American scientist (1838–1923)

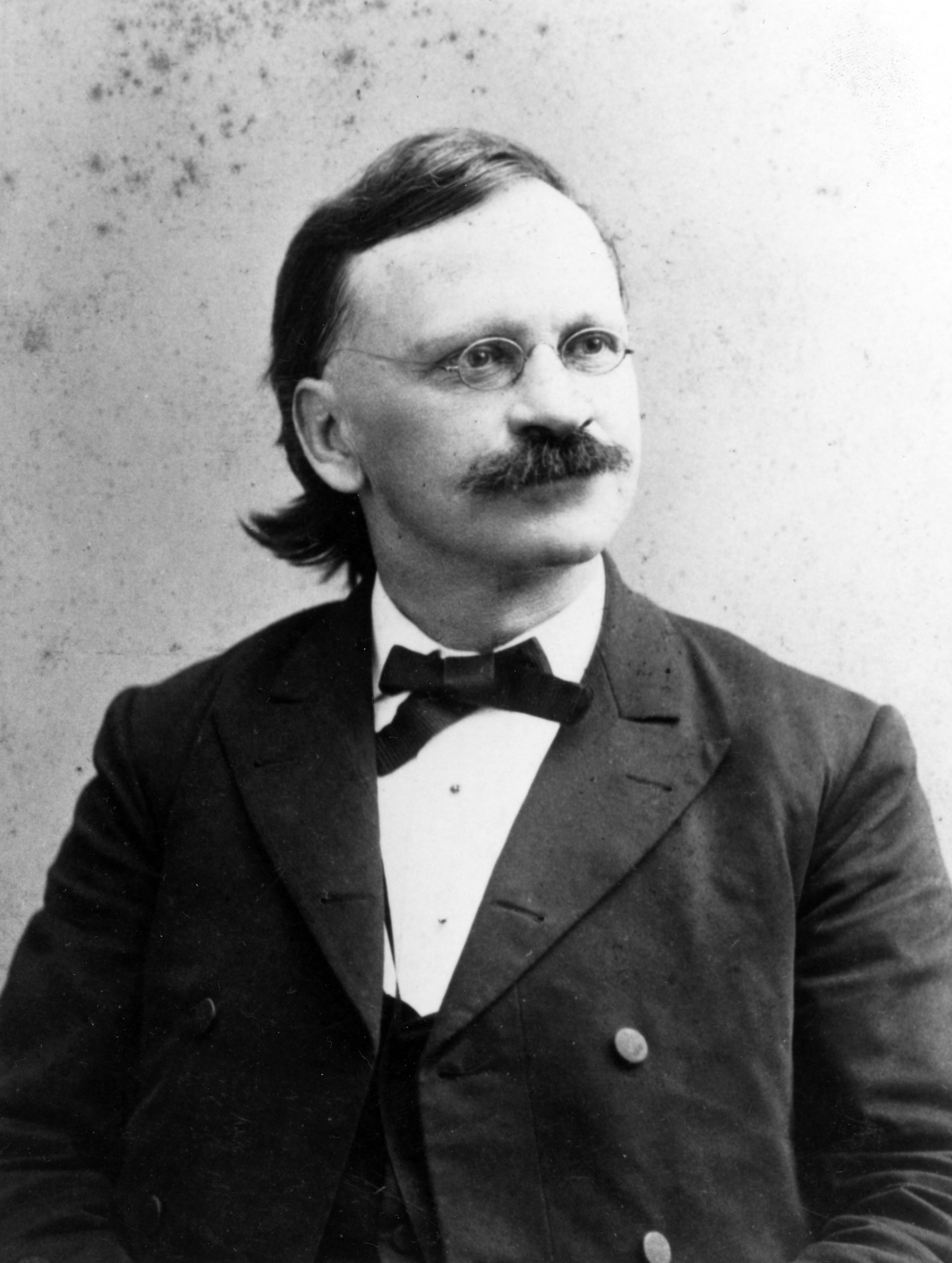
- Morley c. 1885
- Born: January 29, 1838; Newark, New Jersey
- Died: February 24, 1923 (aged 85); West Hartford, Connecticut
- Education: Williams College
- Known for: Michelson–Morley experiment Fine structure
- Spouse: Imbella A. Birdsall (m. 1888; died 1922)
- Awards: Elliott Cresson Medal (1912); Davy Medal (1907); Willard Gibbs Award (1917)
- Scientific career
- Workplaces: Western Reserve College; Western Reserve University

Edward Williams Morley (January 29, 1838 – February 24, 1923) was an American scientist known for his precise and accurate measurement of the atomic weight of oxygen, and for the Michelson–Morley experiment.

== Biography ==
Morley was born in Newark, New Jersey, to Anna Clarissa Treat and the Reverend Sardis Brewster Morley. Both parents were of early colonial ancestry and of purely British origin. He grew up in West Hartford, Connecticut. During his childhood, he suffered much from ill health and was therefore educated by his father at home until the age of nineteen.

In 1857 Morley entered Williams College at Williamstown, Massachusetts, his father's alma mater. He received his A.B. in 1860 and his master's degree in 1863. Around 1860 he gradually shifted his attention from chemistry, which fascinated him since he was child, to optics and astronomy. In 1860–61 he mounted a transit instrument, constructed a chronograph, and made the first accurate determination of the latitude of the college observatory. This determination was the subject of his first published paper, which was read before the American Association for the Advancement of Science in 1866.

Upon advice of his parents, Morley entered Andover Theological Seminary in 1861, finishing in 1864. It was here, probably, that he acquired a good working knowledge of Hebrew. From 1866 to 1868 he was a teacher in a private school and later, in 1868, he was called to preach in a small country parish in Ohio. At about the same time, he was appointed professor of chemistry in Western Reserve College (then situated at Hudson, Ohio and later moved to Cleveland and renamed Case Western Reserve University), where he remained until his retirement in 1906. This appointment was the turning point in his career. In 1873 he also became professor of chemistry in Cleveland Medical College, but resigned this chair in 1888 to have more time for research. Just before moving to Hudson he married Miss Imbella A. Birdsall.

During his residence in Cleveland, Morley assembled one of the best private collections of chemical periodicals in the United States. He even included Russian journals and learned enough of the Russian language to use them. After his retirement from teaching, the university purchased his library and relocated to the chemical laboratory named after him. In 1906, he moved to West Hartford, Connecticut, where he built a small house and a laboratory for his personal studies of rocks and minerals.

Morley was a prolific author; he published 55 articles. He outlived his wife by only a few months and, following a surgical operation, died in the Hartford Hospital in 1923.

== Research ==
=== Optics and astronomy ===
Morley's most-significant work came in the field of physics and optics. In this, he collaborated with and assisted the physicist Albert A. Michelson for several years around 1887. They set up, executed, and improved their techniques many times in what we call the Michelson–Morley experiment. This involved making more and more accurate measurements of the speed of light in various directions, and at different times of the year, as the Earth revolved in its orbit around the Sun. These careful measurements were created to measure the differences in the speed of light in different directions. Michelson and Morley always found that the speed of light did not vary at all depending on the direction of measurement, or the position of the Earth in its orbit, deducing what we call a "null result" for their speed-of-light experiments.

Neither he nor Michelson ever considered that these null results disproved the hypothesis of the existence of "luminiferous aether", in which electromagnetic waves were thought to be propagated. Their null results led the Irish physicist George Francis FitzGerald to postulate what we now call the FitzGerald–Lorentz contraction of physical objects in the direction of their movement in inertial frames of reference.

However, other scientists did come to the conclusion that the aether did not exist. The results of the Michelson–Morley experiments supported Albert Einstein's strong postulate in 1905 that the speed of light is a constant in all inertial frames of reference for his Special Theory of Relativity.

Morley also collaborated with Dayton Miller on positive aether experiments after his work with Michelson. Morley himself made measurements of the speed of light when it passes through a strong magnetic field. He also studied the thermal expansion of solid materials.

=== Chemistry ===
At Western Reserve College, Morley was required to teach, not only chemistry, but also geology and botany, leaving him little time for research. Nevertheless, he found time during the first ten years at Hudson to publish five articles, mostly on the accuracy of measurements.

In chemistry, his original field, Morley had worked on determining accurate values for the composition of the atmosphere and the weights of its gases. His work on the atomic weight of oxygen covered a period of eleven years. Much time was spent in the calibration of instruments and improving the measurement accuracy to the highest possible degree (ca. 1 part per 10,000). In 1895 he introduced a new value for the atomic weight ratio of oxygen to hydrogen, providing the most precise determination of the atomic weight of oxygen at the time. His research on the atomic weight of oxygen was recognized as a National Historic Chemical Landmark by the American Chemical Society in 1995.

== Honors ==
Morley was elected to the American Academy of Arts and Sciences in 1892. He was the president of the American Association for the Advancement of Science in 1895 and he was the president of the American Chemical Society in 1899. In 1903, he was elected to the American Philosophical Society. He was awarded the Davy Medal, named for the great British chemist Sir Humphry Davy, by the Royal Society of London in 1907. He also won the Elliott Cresson Medal, awarded by the Franklin Institute of Pennsylvania, in 1912, for important contributions to the science of chemistry. He received the Willard Gibbs Award of the Chicago Section of the American Chemical Society in 1917.

The lunar crater Morley on the near side was named for him. The Morley Elementary School in West Hartford, Connecticut, was also named for him, as was the Morley Scientific Laboratory on the Williams College campus. His house in West Hartford was made a National Historic Landmark in 1975.

The Cleveland Section of the American Chemical Society (Cleveland-ACS) annually sponsors a regional award named in honor of Edward W. Morley, which consists of the Morley Medal in addition to a monetary honorarium. The purpose of this annual award by the Cleveland-ACS is to recognize contributions to chemistry through outstanding achievements in research, teaching, research administration, engineering, and public service. The contributions for which the award is given should have been made within about 250 miles of Cleveland, the research home of Edward W. Morley. Notable early awardees include Melvin S. Newman (1969) (known for Newman projections in organic chemistry), and Nobel Prize laureate George A. Olah in 1970. A list of all previous awardees to date is maintained by the ACS-Cleveland Section.
