= Edward W. Morley House =

Historic house in Connecticut, United States

- U.S. National Register of Historic Places
- U.S. National Historic Landmark
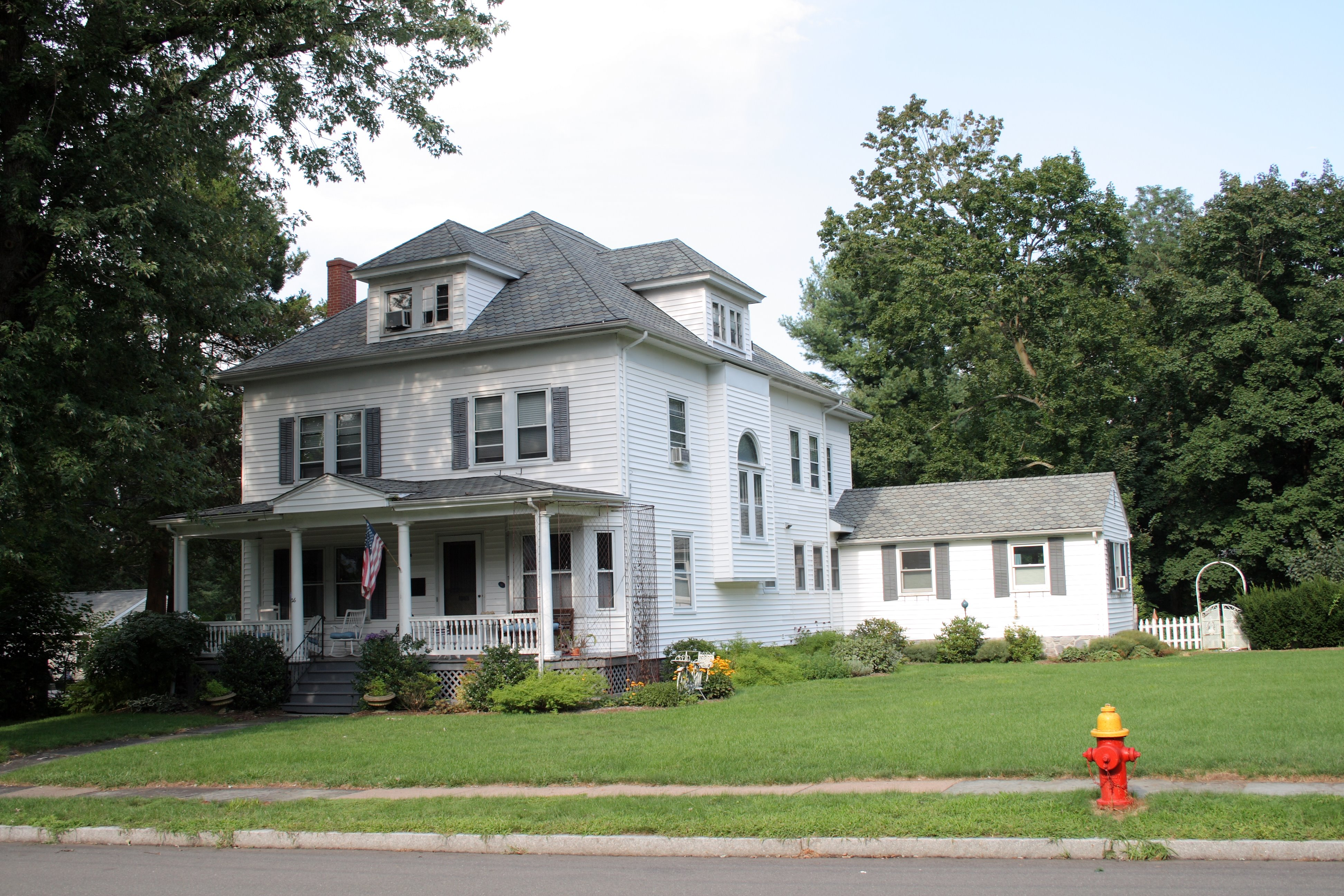

- Location within Connecticut Location within the United States
- Location: 26 Westland Avenue, West Hartford, Connecticut
- Coordinates: 41°45′27″N 72°45′10″W
- Built: 1906
- Architectural style: Vernacular
- NRHP reference No.: 75002057

Significant dates
- Added to NRHP: May 15, 1975
- Designated NHL: May 15, 1975

The Edward W. Morley House is a historic house and National Historic Landmark at 26 Westland Avenue in West Hartford, Connecticut. It is notable as the home of the scientist Edward W. Morley (1838–1923) from 1906 to 1923. Morley is famous for his collaboration with Albert A. Michelson on the Michelson–Morley experiment and for his work on the atomic weights of hydrogen and oxygen.

== Description and history ==
The Morley House is an architecturally undistinguished 2 1/2 story wood-frame structure, with a hip roof and a single chimney rising from the left side. The roof is pierced by hip-roofed dormers. The front of the house is spanned by a single-story porch with a low-pitch hip roof and a gable above the stairs, which rise to the front door. The house was built in 1906 for Edward W. Morley, who made it his home until his death in 1923, and has reportedly been little altered since then.

Morley was born in Newark, New Jersey in 1838, educated at home (his father was a Congregationalist minister and his mother a school teacher). He graduated from Williams College in 1860, then studied theology at the Andover Theological Seminary before eventually accepting a position teaching chemistry at Western Reserve College in 1869. His reputation as a leading chemist and physicist was cemented during his tenure there, contributing to the apparatus of the famous Michelson–Morley experiment, which proved that light was not carried by any sort of luminiferous aether. His most significant solo contribution to scientific knowledge was the calculation of the atomic weights of hydrogen and oxygen, and determining the composition of water from these elements. Morley retired in 1905, settling in this house, and continuing to run experiments in a laboratory in the garage until his death in 1923.

== See also ==
- List of National Historic Landmarks in Connecticut
- National Register of Historic Places listings in West Hartford, Connecticut
