= Charles Hotchkiss Norton =

American mechanical engineer and tool designer

Charles Hotchkiss Norton (November 23, 1851, Plainville, Connecticut – October 27, 1942, Plainville, Connecticut) was an American mechanical engineer and designer of machine tools.

After working for the Seth Thomas Clock company in Thomaston, in 1886 Norton became Assistant Engineer with the Brown & Sharpe Manufacturing Company at Providence, Rhode Island, redesigning their universal grinding machine. In 1890 he became a partner in the newly established Leland, Faulconer & Norton Company at Detroit, Michigan, designing and constructing machine tools. Returning to Brown & Sharpe in 1896, he designed a grinding machine with larger and heavier grinding wheels, capable of supplying machine parts for the emerging automobile industry. In 1900 he left Brown & Sharpe to found the Norton Grinding Company in Worcester, Massachusetts, with support from the Norton Emery Wheel Company (founded by an unrelated Norton); the two firms merged in 1919, with Norton as their Chief Engineer until 1934, when he became their Consulting Engineer. On April 8, 1925, he was a recipient of The John Scott Medal and Premium for his invention of "accurate grinding devices of high power".

Charles H. Norton House, the house in Plainville in which Norton lived until his death in 1942, is today a National Historic Landmark.
