= Connecticut Route 57 =

State highway in Fairfield County, Connecticut, US

Route 57
- Map of Fairfield County in southwestern Connecticut with Route 57 highlighted in red

Route information
- Maintained by CTDOT
- Length: 9.51 mi (15.30 km)
- Existed: 1932–present

Major junctions
- South end: Route 33 in Westport
- Route 15 / Merritt Parkway in Westport
- North end: US 7 in Georgetown

Location
- Country: United States
- State: Connecticut
- Counties: Fairfield

Highway system
- Connecticut State Highway System; Interstate; US; State; SSR; SR; Scenic
← Route 55	→ Route 58

Route 57 is a secondary state highway in western Connecticut serving as the "Main Street" of and connecting the towns of Westport and Weston. The road continues north through Redding to end at U.S. Route 7 just after crossing into Wilton, in the neighborhood of Georgetown.

== Route description ==
Route 57 begins as Kings Highway North at the west bank of the Saugatuck River at an intersection with Route 33 North of Downtown Westport. After crossing the river, it turns north onto Canal Street then onto Main Street. Route 57 overlaps with Route 136 for 0.3 mi (0.48 km) between Compo Road North and Weston Road. Route 57 then turns onto Weston Road as it intersects an interchange with Route 15 (Merritt Parkway) in Westport. Continuing north, Route 57 crosses over the Aspetuck River and Saugatuck River before crossing into the town of Weston. Route 57 continues through Weston center, where it briefly overlaps Route 53. Past Weston center, the road becomes Georgetown Road and proceeds for another four miles (6 km) through Weston until it reaches Route 107 just across the town line in Redding. Route 57 then turns west along Route 107 (Redding Road and School Street), overlapping it for 0.3 mi (0.48 km) into the Georgetown village of the town of Wilton. Routes 57 and 107 end concurrently at US 7 in Georgetown.

== History ==
Route 57 was commissioned in 1932 running from Westport center to Weston center, then along the old Newtown Turnpike to Newtown. The portion of the original route north of Weston center ran from the current northern intersection with Route 53 across Route 58 in Redding to an intersection the old US 202, now Route 302, in Newtown. In 1935, Route 57 was truncated to the intersection of the Newtown Turnpike at Route 58. In 1954, the northern part of Route 57 was relocated to its current route along Georgetown Road towards Georgetown (former alignment of Route 53). The Newtown Turnpike portion of former Route 57 became unsigned SR 725, which was assigned in 1963 to a new alignment of Route 53.

== Junction list ==
The entire route is in Fairfield County.

Location	mi	km	Destinations	Notes
Westport	0.00	0.00	Route 33 (Wilton Road)	Southern terminus
Westport	0.09– 0.12	0.14– 0.19	Saugatuck River Bridge	
Westport	0.91	1.46	Route 136 south – Westport, Saugatuck, Sherwood Island	Southern end of Route 136 concurrency
Westport	1.21	1.95	Route 136 north (Easton Road)	Northern end of Route 136 concurrency
Westport	1.40	2.25	Route 15 / Merritt Parkway – New Haven, New York City	Exit 21 on Merritt Parkway
Weston	4.31	6.94	Route 53 south – New Canaan, Wilton	Southern end of Route 53 concurrency
Weston	5.13	8.26	Route 53 north (Newtown Turnpike) – Redding	Northern end of Route 53 concurrency
Georgetown	9.16	14.74	Route 107 north – Redding Center, West Redding, Bethel	Southern end of Route 107 concurrency
Georgetown	9.51	15.30	US 7 – Wilton, Norwalk, Ridgefield, Danbury Route 107 ends	Northern terminus; southern terminus of Route 107
1.000 mi = 1.609 km; 1.000 km = 0.621 mi: Concurrency terminus
