= Devil's Den Preserve =

Nature preserve in Connecticut, US

Coordinates: 41.2365°N 73.3960°W

The Lucius Pond Ordway Devil's Den Preserve in Weston and Redding, Connecticut, encompassing 1,746 acres (7.07 km^{2}), is the largest preserve in Fairfield County, Connecticut, and one of the larger preserves in the metropolitan New York area. The preserve's name derives from local lore: charcoal makers in the hilly, rocky area would say that a hoof-like mark made in a boulder was the footprint of the Devil.

Devil's Den is the most frequently visited preserve (and largest contiguous preserve) run by the Connecticut chapter of the Nature Conservancy, with 40,000 visits per year. The main entrance is at the end of Pent Road in Weston. The park is open from dawn till dusk.

The New Canaan Nature Center runs programs and hikes in the woody park. The preserve has 20 miles (32 km) of trails, and maps are available at the Pent Road parking area.

The preserve is part of the watershed of the West Branch of the Saugatuck River and part of the extended 70-mile (110 km) "Saugatuck Valley Trails System".

Flora and fauna in the preserve include more than 500 types of trees and wildflowers, the pink lady's slipper, cardinal flower, and Indian pipe, such animals as red fox, bobcat, coyote, and eastern copperhead snake, and more than 140 bird species, including wood duck, ruffed grouse, and pileated woodpecker.

== History ==
Humans have used the area for hunting as far back as 5,000 years ago, according to archaeological evidence found in the park. A sawmill was once located below Godfrey Pond in the preserve, a part of the area's history as a lumbering and charcoal-burning center, especially during the 19th century.

From April 25 to April 27, 1777, residents of Redding and Weston were thought to have taken refuge in the Devil's Den to escape harassment by a column of British troops marching north from Long Island Sound to destroy a military supply depot in Danbury, Connecticut.

The park was founded by Katharine Ordway, who bought 1,100 acres (4.5 km^{2}) from the Bridgeport Hydraulic Company in 1966 and added more land to the original purchase from 1966 to 1968.

The preserve was closed to the public from March 2020 until August 2021 during the COVID-19 pandemic.
