= Connecticut Route 53 =

State highway in Fairfield County, Connecticut, US

Route 53
- Map of Fairfield County in southwestern Connecticut with Route 53 highlighted in red

Route information
- Maintained by CTDOT
- Length: 23.57 mi (37.93 km)
- Existed: 1932–present

Major junctions
- South end: US 1 in Norwalk
- Route 57 in Weston; Route 107 in Redding
- North end: I-84 / US 6 / US 7 / US 202 / Route 37 / Route 39 in Danbury

Location
- Country: United States
- State: Connecticut
- Counties: Fairfield

Highway system
- Connecticut State Highway System; Interstate; US; State; SSR; SR; Scenic
← Route 52	→ Route 55

Route 53 is a state highway in the U.S. state of Connecticut, connecting the cities of Norwalk and Danbury. Most of the route has been made redundant by U.S. Route 7 (US 7), except for the last section from Bethel to Danbury, which is part of a direct route (Route 58) from the Bridgeport area to Danbury.

== Route description ==
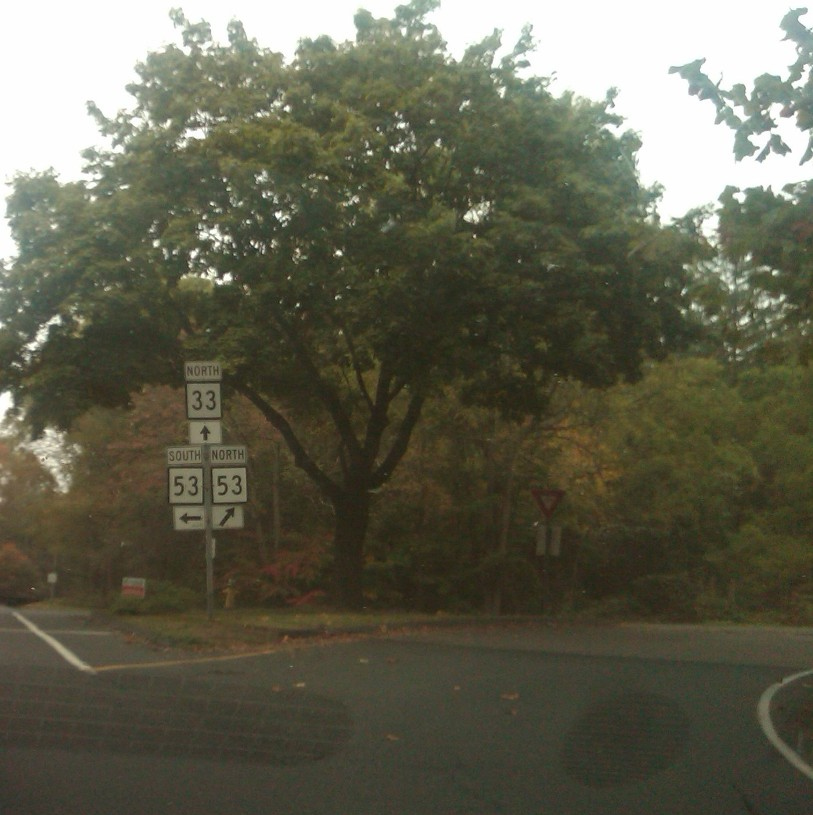
Intersection of Routes 33 and 53

Route 53 begins at US 1 in Norwalk and travels through the towns of Norwalk, Wilton, Weston, Redding, and Bethel. Route 53 ends in Downtown Danbury at a quadruple junction with Routes 37, 39, and a secondary state road leading to Interstate 84.

A 2.03-mile (3.27 km) section in Redding, running from the Weston town line to the beginning of a brief concurrency with Route 107, is a designated state scenic road.

== History ==
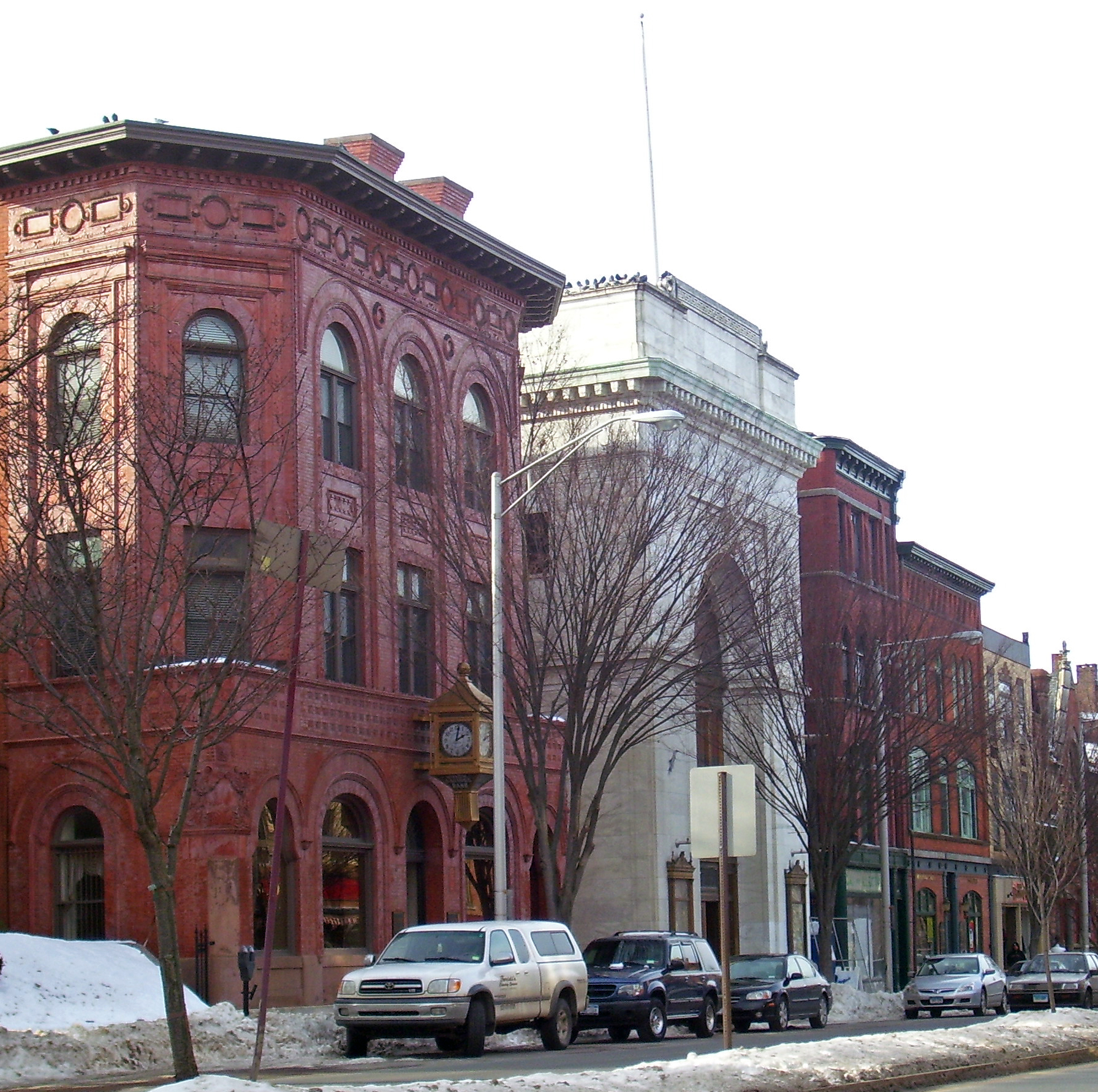
Danbury's historic Main Street near the northern end of 53.

The main road connecting the city of Norwalk to the borough of Newtown was organized as a private turnpike in May 1829. Known as the Norwalk and Newtown Turnpike, or more commonly as just the Newtown Turnpike, the road mostly used modern Route 53 from Norwalk to the Saugatuck Reservoir in Redding. Northeast of the reservoir, the old Newtown Turnpike continued the straight route using what are now town roads (Newtown Turnpike, Hopewell Woods Road, Poverty Hollow Road, and Key Rock Road) to Route 302 in the Dodgingtown section of Newtown, then Route 302 into Newtown borough. The portion of modern Route 53 between the West Redding section of Redding and Bethel center was the northern half of the Norwalk and Danbury Turnpike. This turnpike was chartered in 1795 and used part of modern US 7, modern Route 107, and Umpawaug Road to West Redding, then continued on modern Route 53. Between Redding Center and West Redding, modern Route 53 was the northern half of the Northfield Turnpike, which was chartered in 1826. The southern half is now Valley Forge Road and Lyons Plains Road.

In 1922, part of the Norwalk and Danbury Turnpike between West Redding and Bethel was given the designation State Highway 180 while part of the Newtown Turnpike between Redding Ridge and Newtown was assigned as State Highway 158. Route 53 was first defined in the 1932 state highway renumbering between Weston center to Georgetown along Georgetown Road (modern Route 57), then along Redding Road (Routes 107 and 53) to West Redding, then along former Highway 180 to Bethel. In 1954, the southern end was relocated and now ended at US 7 in Wilton. Route 57 took over the former Georgetown Road segment and the Newtown Turnpike became unsigned SR 725. In 1963, the southern part was relocated onto the Newtown Turnpike (former SR 725) to Weston Center, then shifted to the alignment of former Route 103 (Chestnut Hill Road/East Avenue) via Cedar Road/Norfield Road (former SR 741). In 1973, Route 53 took over former US 202 to Downtown Danbury when US 202 was relocated to a new alignment.

== Junction list ==
The entire route is in Fairfield County.

Location	mi	km	Destinations	Notes
Norwalk	0.00	0.00	US 1 (North Avenue) to I-95 – Westport, Darien	Southern terminus; access to I-95 via East Avenue
Wilton	3.91	6.29	Route 33 – Westport	
Wilton	5.18	8.34	Route 106 west (Chestnut Hill Road)	Eastern terminus of Route 106
Weston	6.47	10.41	Route 57 south – Westport	Southern end of Route 57 concurrency
Weston	7.29	11.73	Route 57 north – Georgetown	Northern end of Route 57 concurrency
Redding	13.74	22.11	Route 107 south – Georgetown	Southern end of Route 107 concurrency
Redding	13.85	22.29	Route 107 north – Redding	Northern end of Route 107 concurrency
Bethel	20.29	32.65	Route 302 east – Bethel, Railroad Station	Western terminus of Route 302
Danbury	23.57	37.93	I-84 / US 7 (US 6 / US 202) / Route 37 north / Route 39 north – New Fairfield	Northern terminus; southern termini of Routes 37 and 39; exit 5 on I-84
1.000 mi = 1.609 km; 1.000 km = 0.621 mi: Concurrency terminus
