= Connecticut Route 107 =

State highway in Fairfield County, Connecticut, US

Route 107
- Map of Fairfield County in southwestern Connecticut with Route 107 highlighted in red

Route information
- Maintained by CTDOT
- Length: 7.50 mi (12.07 km)
- Existed: 1932–present

Major junctions
- South end: US 7 in Georgetown
- North end: Route 58 in Redding

Location
- Country: United States
- State: Connecticut
- Counties: Fairfield

Highway system
- Connecticut State Highway System; Interstate; US; State; SSR; SR; Scenic
← Route 106	→ Route 108

Route 107 is a state highway in southwestern Connecticut, connecting the village of Georgetown to the town center of Redding.

== Route description ==
Route 107 begins as School Street at an intersection with U.S. Route 7 in the northeast corner of the town of Wilton. It soon enters the town of Redding (after 0.2 mi) and crosses the Norwalk River. Right after crossing the river, Route 57 splits off to the south heading into the main center of Georgetown. Route 57 is officially overlapped with Route 107 between this point and US 7. Route 107, now known as Redding Road, continues northeast out of Georgetown towards the Saugatuck River. Route 107 meets and briefly over overlaps Route 53 after about two miles (3 km) west of Redding Center as it crosses the Saugatuck River. East of Route 53, the road becomes known as Hill Road and enters the town center 0.9 miles (1.4 km) later. North of the town center Route 107 becomes known as Lonetown Road. As Lonetown Road, Route 107 then turns north, passing by Redding Country Club and Redding Elementary School before turning east onto Putnam Park Road. Route 107 continues for another 0.8 miles (1.3 km) until it ends at the Black Rock Turnpike (Route 58).

== History ==
In 1834, the Sherman and Redding Turnpike was incorporated to improve and maintain a road from Redding center, through Danbury, to the town of Sherman. The turnpike began at the junction of Newtown Turnpike and Sherman Turnpike in Redding and ran through Redding center. It continued north along Lonetown Road into Bethel and beyond. By 1846, however, there was a report to the Connecticut Legislature that the turnpike had been mostly unmaintained for the past six years. Soon after that pieces of the Sherman Turnpike were disincorporated and returned to either the towns or to the individuals who originally owned the lands. Most of the alignment north of Danbury is now abandoned. The portion of modern Route 107 in Georgetown was also part of another turnpike, the Norwalk and Danbury Turnpike, which later became part of Route 53.

Route 107 was established in the 1932 state highway renumbering but was only designated as a connector between Route 53 in Georgetown and Route 58 in Putnam Memorial State Park. The portion of modern Route 107 west of Route 53 was mostly part of the original alignment of Route 53. In 1963, as a result of the Route Reclassification Act of 1962, Route 53 was extended south along the Newtown Turnpike alignment, and the section of former Route 53 running to US 7 was reassigned to Route 107.

== Junction list ==
The entire route is in Fairfield County.

Location	mi	km	Destinations	Notes
Georgetown	0.00	0.00	US 7 – Wilton, Norwalk, Ridgefield, Danbury Route 57 begins	Southern terminus; northern terminus of Route 57
Georgetown	0.35	0.56	Route 57 south – Weston, Westport	Northern end of Route 57 concurrency
Redding	3.67	5.91	Route 53 south – Weston	Southern end of Route 53 concurrency
Redding	3.78	6.08	Route 53 north – West Redding, Danbury	Northern end of Route 53 concurrency
Redding	7.50	12.07	Route 58 – Bethel, Redding Ridge	Northern terminus
1.000 mi = 1.609 km; 1.000 km = 0.621 mi: Concurrency terminus
