= Gilbert & Bennett =

American wire mill and wire manufacturing company

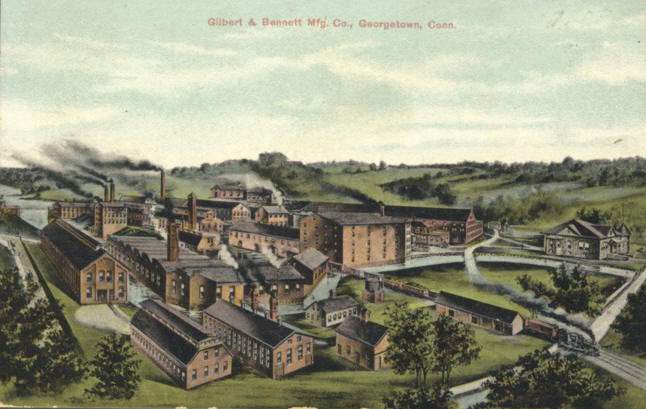
- G&B in Georgetown, Connecticut (1909)
- Company type: Private company
- Industry: Industrial manufacturing
- Founded: 1818; 207 years ago in Redding, Connecticut, U.S.
- Founder: Benjamin Gilbert; Sturges Bennett
- Defunct: 2001
- Number of locations: 1
- Owner: Town of Redding (development site)

Gilbert & Bennett (officially Gilbert & Bennett Manufacturing Company) was an American wire mill and wire manufacturing company.

== History ==
The company was founded in 1834 by Benjamin Gilbert and Sturges Bennett in the Georgetown section of Redding, Connecticut. In 1998, G&B filed for bankruptcy after its once prosperous industrial manufacturing fell victim to the growing deindustrialization and it ultimately ceased operation in 2001.

In 2002, the Town of Redding found a partner to revitalize the former site, in the Georgetown Land Development Company (GLDC); however, this company went bankrupt as well and several tax liens made the town reclaim the 55-acre site. As of 2023 many environmental surveys are required to make the site usable for residential or mixed-use projects which are currently performed by the town.
