= Saugatuck River =

River in Connecticut, United States

Coordinates: 41°07′30″N 73°22′08″W

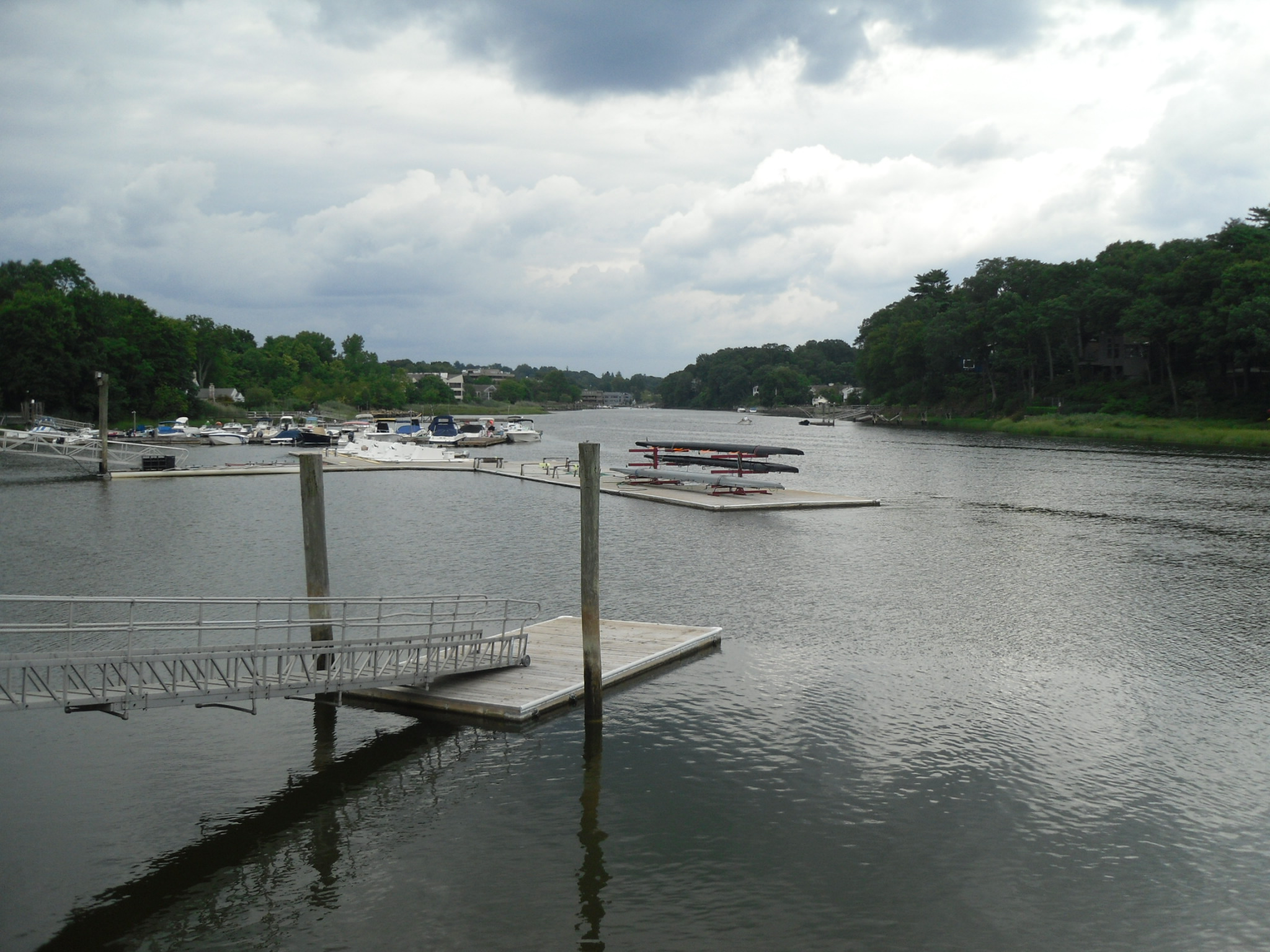

The Saugatuck River is a 23.7-mile-long (38.1 km) river in southwestern Connecticut in the United States. It drains part of suburban and rural Fairfield County west of Bridgeport, emptying into Long Island Sound.

The Aspetuck River is a major tributary of the Saugatuck River.

== Description ==
The Saugatuck River issues from Sugar Hollow Pond, its headwaters located at exactly 41°20'50.4"N 73°28'06.4"W approximately 3 miles (5 km) southwest of downtown Danbury. It flows generally southeast, passing through the Saugatuck Reservoir (283 feet (86 m) above sea level), then turns south-southwest. In Westport, it broadens into a navigable estuary along its lower 5 miles (8 km) and enters Long Island Sound approximately 4 miles (6 km) southeast of Norwalk. Interstate 95 crosses the river near its mouth downstream from Westport center. The river is wadeable along much of its course and is a popular seasonal destination for trout fishing, with the state of Connecticut stocking the river annually.

In the 17th century the river was the site of a Paugusset settlement. The name of the river means "river that flows out" in the Paugusset language. The land east of the river was opened to white settlement in 1637 after the defeat of the Pequots by John Mason in the Pequot War. After treaties with the local tribes, members of the Connecticut Colony began to settle the area between the Saugatuck and the Norwalk rivers to the west between 1639 and 1661. In the 18th century farming villages sprang up along the river, which was the principal means of transportation. During the 19th century, the lower river became the site of warehouses and shipyards, as well as an important hub of maritime commerce. The town of Westport was incorporated out of the existing village of Saugatuck at the mouth of the Saugatuck River and several surrounding communities in 1835.

In 1908, the author Samuel Clemens moved into a villa he named "Stormfield" built on a hill overlooking the Saugatuck River in Redding, Connecticut. Clemens died in 1910, and the original Stormfield was destroyed in a 1923 fire.

Bridgeport Hydraulic Company Holdings (now owned by Aquarion) flooded portions of the Saugatuck River Valley in Weston, Redding, and Easton after 1938, displacing the villages of Hull and Valley Forge to create the Saugatuck Reservoir.

== Crossings ==
In Westport, Route 136 crosses the river on the Saugatuck River Bridge, built in 1882, the oldest surviving moveable bridge in Connecticut. The moveable section consists of a hand-cranked swing span made of two pin-connected Pratt trusses. The bridge replaced a wooden truss structure erected in 1873. Before that, a ferry service, started in 1746, helped passengers cross the river.

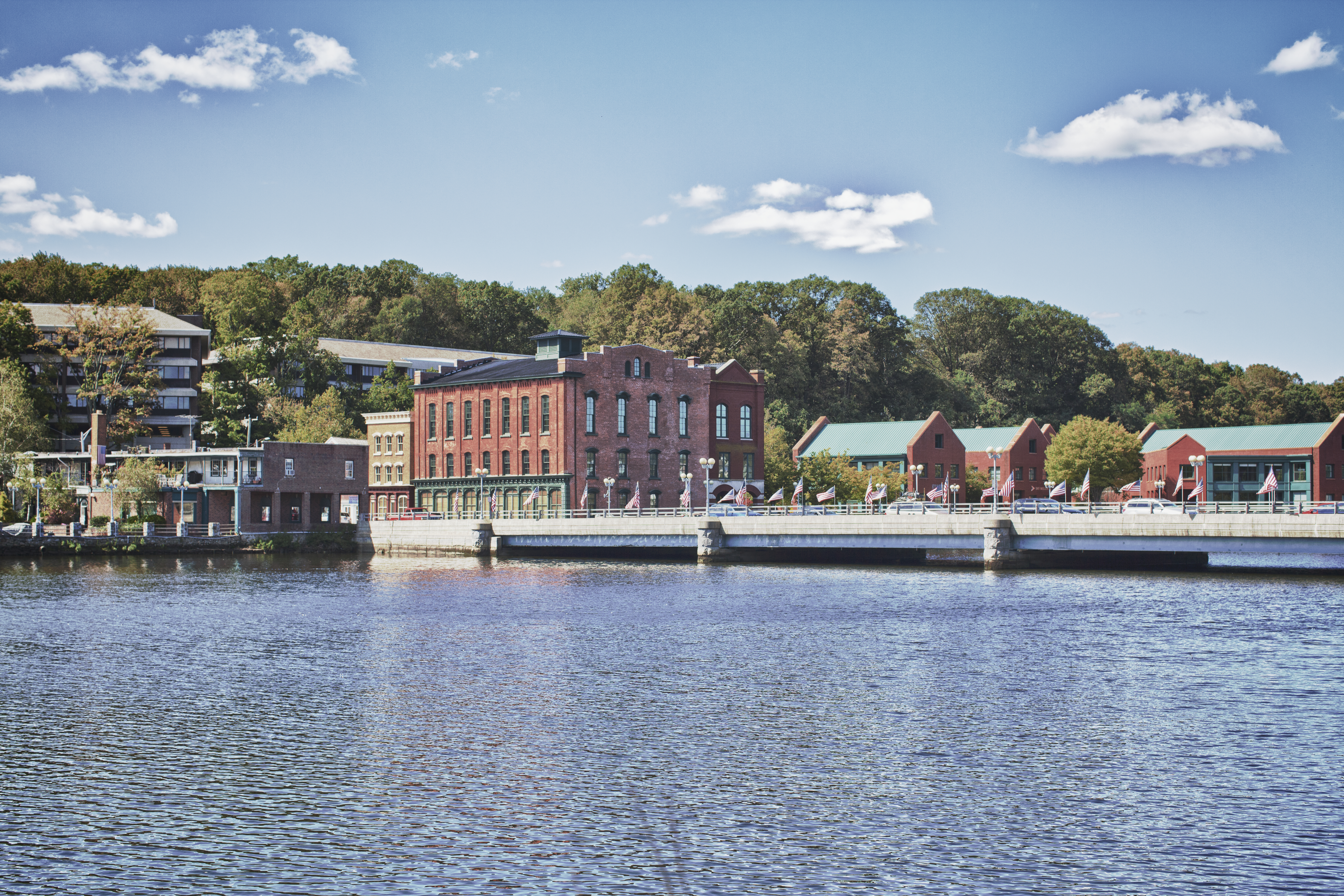
Saugatuck River, Westport, Connecticut

The crossings of the Saugatuck River are (from mouth to source):

- In Westport:
  - Saugatuck River Railroad Bridge (Metro-North Railroad)
  - Bridge carrying Interstate 95
  - Saugatuck River Bridge (Route 136)
  - Ruth Steinkraus Cohen Bridge (U.S. Route 1)
  - Bridge carrying King's Highway (Route 57)
  - Bridge carrying the Merritt Parkway
  - Burrs Bridge (Weston Road/Route 57)
- In Weston:
  - River Road
  - Cartbridge Road
  - Davis Hill Road
  - Valley Forge Road
- In Redding:
  - Newtown Turnpike (Route 53)
  - Glen Road (Route 53)
  - Redding Road (Routes 53 and 107)
  - Diamond Hill Road
  - Redding Road (Route 53 – twice)
  - Station Road
  - Simpaug Turnpike
  - George Hull Hill Road
- In Danbury:
  - East Starrs Plain Road
  - Hemlock Hill Road
  - Starrs Plain Road (twice)

== Culture ==
USS Saugatuck, a U.S. Navy oiler that saw service in World War II, was named after the river.

The 1972 REO Speedwagon song 157 Riverside Avenue mentions the river in its lyrics.

Secrets of Redding Glen, a 1973 children's book written and illustrated by Jo Polseno, chronicles the natural cycle of wildlife along a section of the Saugatuck River.

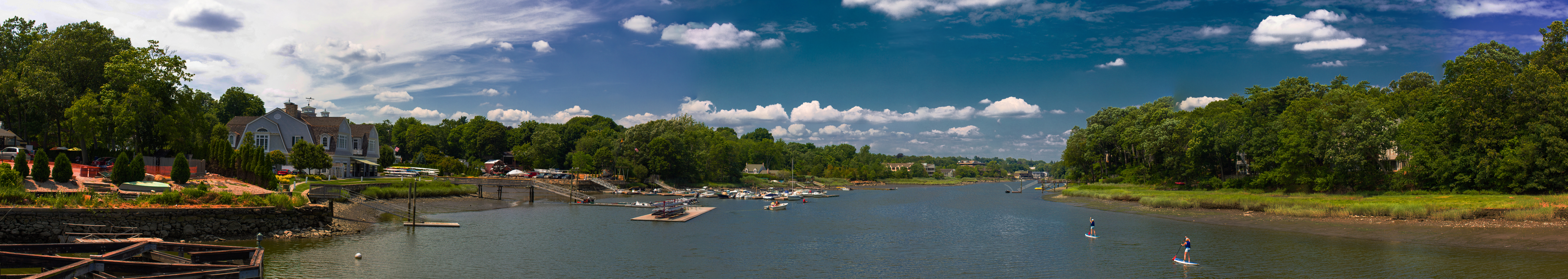
Panoramic view looking out from Saugatuck Bridge, Westport, CT, USA

== See also ==
- List of rivers of Connecticut
