= Georgetown Historic District (Georgetown, Connecticut) =

Historic district in Connecticut, United States

- U.S. National Register of Historic Places
- U.S. Historic district
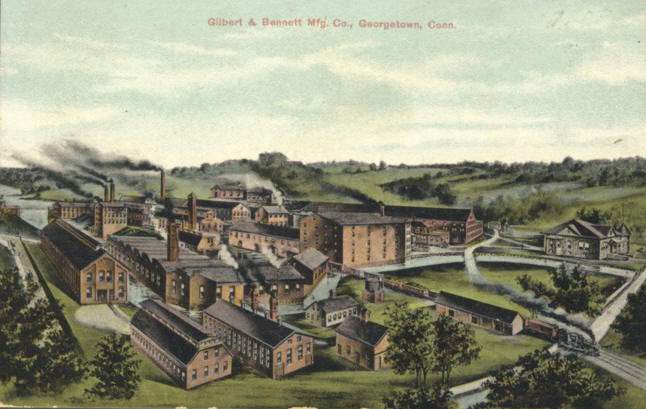
- Gilbert and Benett manufacturing plant, 1909

- Location within Connecticut Location within the United States
- Location: Roughly bounded by Route 7, Portland Avenue, Route 107, and the Norwalk River, Redding, Connecticut and Wilton, Connecticut
- Coordinates: 41°15′19″N 73°25′53″W
- Area: 125 acres (51 ha)
- Architectural style: Colonial Revival, Bungalow/Craftsman, Italianate
- NRHP reference No.: 87000343
- Added to NRHP: March 9, 1987

The Georgetown Historic District is a historic district which covers the central portion the village of Georgetown, Connecticut. The district includes parts of Georgetown in the towns of Redding, Weston, Wilton, and Ridgefield and consists of the former Gilbert & Bennett manufacturing plant, institutional housing built for the plant workers, other private homes, and the Georgetown business district.

In its 1986 National Register nomination, the district is described as "[A] rare survival of rural industrial history".

The company began as a cottage industry weaving animal hair from cows and horses, started by Benjamin Gilbert. Water power was needed, and the enterprise used a former sawmill facility downriver from the later factory site. The company found success making sieves from animal hair. After much development and a fire, the company focused on wire products including woven wire cloth for meat safes, the first insect wire screening, and poultry netting.

The company is described as having been "[g]uided by nineteenth-century paternalism and enlightened self-interest which carried over well into the twentieth century" for it having "shaped a community which today resembles the rural industrial village of nineteenth-century Utopian ideology." The district consists of properties that are roughly bounded by Route 7, Portland Avenue, Route 107, and the Norwalk River. It includes 120 contributing buildings and one other contributing site over a 125 acres (51 ha) area. Architectural styles in the historic district include Colonial Revival, Bungalow/Craftsman, and Italianate.

The district was listed on the U.S. National Register of Historic Places on January 21, 1987. Fourteen properties in the Town of Wilton, on Church Street, West Church Street, and Redding Road, are also included in the town's Historic District #6, designated in 2007. Exterior alterations to these properties require approval by the Wilton Historic District and Historic Property Commission. Several of the 123 contributing resources originally included in the National Register historic district have been demolished as part of a Georgetown Redevelopment Project.

Since the Gilbert & Bennett property has gone idle, multiple developers have attempted to recreate the site as a mixed-use village combining residential and commercial buildings. In 2005, the U.S. Environmental Protection Agency awarded one proposal its National Award for Smart Growth Achievement.

In 2007, the U.S. Department of the Interior sought Congressional approval for the National Park Service to acquire space on the Gilbert & Bennett property for administration and operational support to the Weir Farm National Historic Site in Ridgefield. Under existing federal law at the time, the National Park Service was authorized to secure expansion space in Ridgefield and Wilton only.

== See also ==
- Washburn and Moen North Works District – another historic wire manufacturer
- National Register of Historic Places listings in Fairfield County, Connecticut
