= Sacred Heart Church (Georgetown, Connecticut) =

Roman Catholic church in Georgetown, Connecticut

Coordinates: 41°15′29.56″N 73°25′58.27″W

- Sacred Heart Church
- Location: Church Street; Georgetown, Connecticut
- Country: United States
- Denomination: Roman Catholic

Administration
- Province: Hartford
- Diocese: Bridgeport

Clergy
- Bishop: Most Rev. Frank J. Caggiano
- Rector: Rev. Michael Novajosky

Sacred Heart Church is a Roman Catholic church in Georgetown, Connecticut, part of the Diocese of Bridgeport. It is listed as a significant contributing property in the Georgetown Historic District. The citation mentions the building's carpenter gothic architecture, points out its valuable stained glass windows, and indicates that the building is especially worthy of being included in this district. In March 2022 it was established as an Oratory by Bishop Frank J. Caggiano. The church celebrates a weekly Solemn Traditional Latin Mass alongside Masses in the Novus Ordo with sung Gregorian chant propers in English. Whether in the old or new rite, the philosophy of the Oratory is an emphasis on beauty, reverence, and continuity with the Church's historical liturgical and artistic tradition.
