= Umpawaug District School =

- U.S. National Register of Historic Places
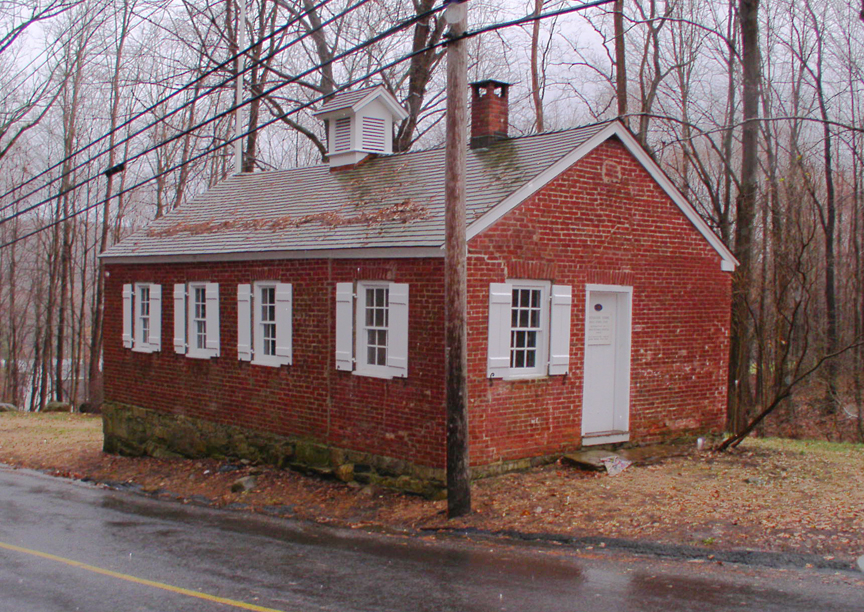

- Location within Connecticut Location within the United States
- Location: Umpawaug Road, Redding, Connecticut
- Coordinates: 41°18′56″N 73°25′46″W
- Area: 0.1 acres (0.040 ha)
- Built: 1790
- Architectural style: Federal
- NRHP reference No.: 88002695
- Added to NRHP: December 1, 1988

The Umpawaug District School is a one-room schoolhouse located near the junction of Umpawaug Road and Marchant in Redding, Connecticut, United States. The school was built in 1790 and was added to the National Register of Historic Places on December 1, 1988. It is the only surviving district schoolhouse in the town. The building was used as a schoolhouse until 1931. Once a year the Redding Historical Society will open the schoolhouse to the public. It is still owned by the town, but is managed by the Redding Historical Society as a museum.

== See also ==
- National Register of Historic Places listings in Fairfield County, Connecticut
