= Washburn and Moen North Works District =

Historic district in Massachusetts, United States

- U.S. National Register of Historic Places
- U.S. Historic district
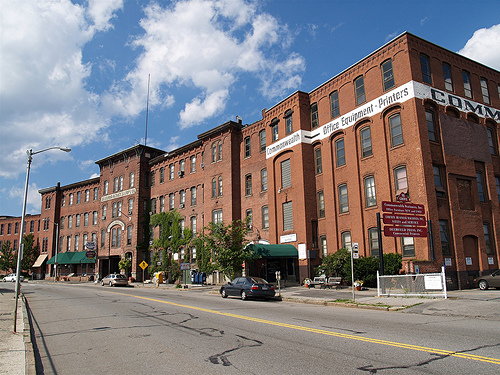

- Location within Massachusetts Location within the United States
- Location: Worcester, Massachusetts
- Coordinates: 42°16′36″N 71°48′4″W
- Built: 1863
- Architectural style: Late Victorian
- MPS: Worcester MRA
- NRHP reference No.: 80000439
- Added to NRHP: March 5, 1980

The Washburn and Moen North Works District encompasses an industrial complex that housed the largest business in Worcester, Massachusetts, United States, in the second half of the 19th century.

== History ==
Founded in 1831, Washburn and Moen was an innovating manufacturer of wire and related products, including telegraph wire, which was used in large quantities during America's westward expansion. In 1874, Barb Fence Company of DeKalb, Illinois began purchasing wire from Washburn and Moen, to manufacture their patented barbed wire. Washburn was curious as to why they bought so much wire; he travelled to DeKalb and persuaded Joseph Glidden, holder of the patent, to sell his half of the manufacturing business to them. Glidden agreed, but retained his royalties from his patent. Glidden's partner, Isaac L. Ellwood, continued manufacture of barbed wire under the name I. L. Ellwood & Co. in DeKalb. Washburn and Moen manufactured barbed wire as well. The product had a large market of ranchers, farmers and railroads in the last quarter of the 19th century. The company acquired a manufacturing monopoly in barbed wire.

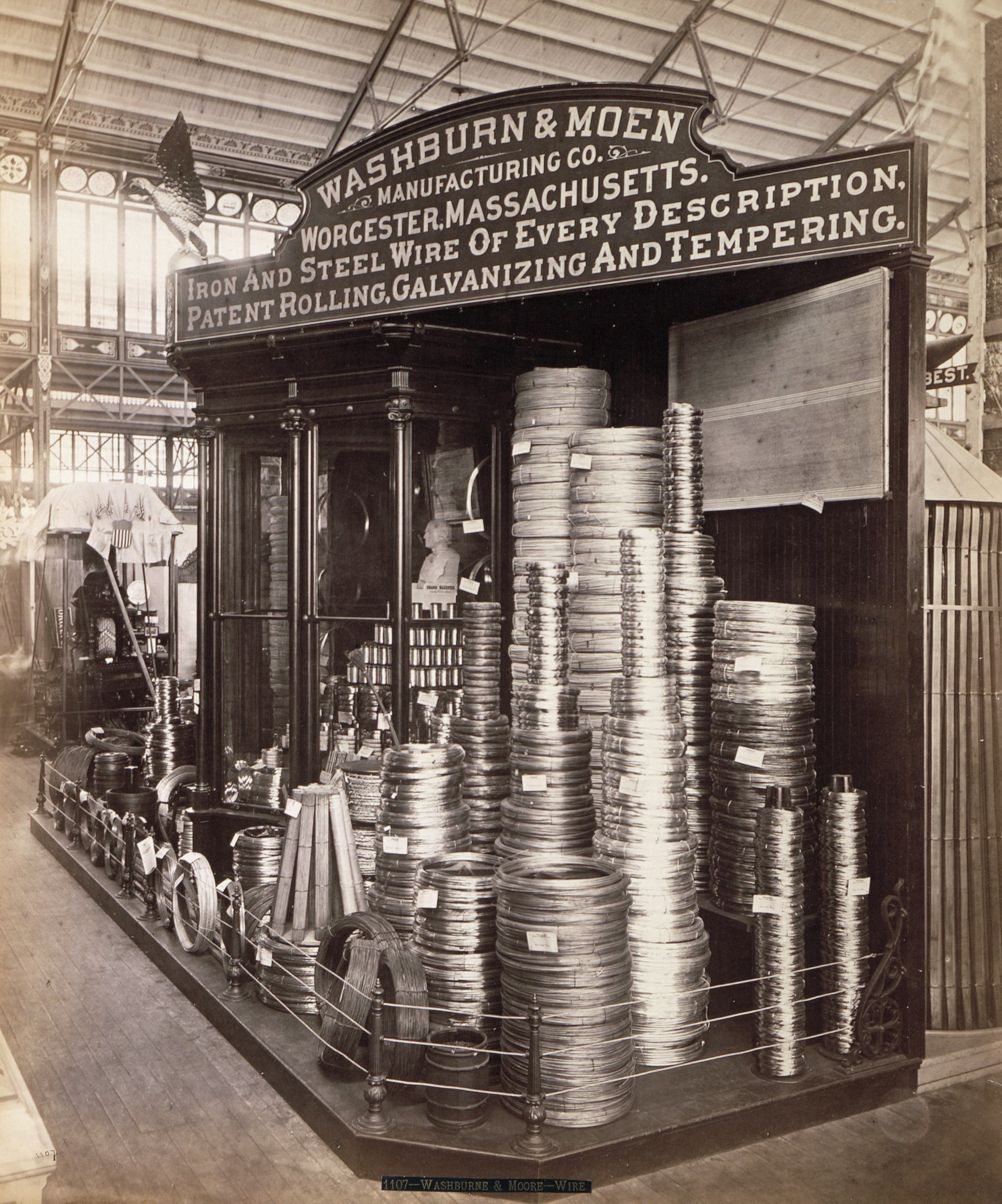
Washburn and Moen exhibit at the U.S. Centennial Exhibition, Philadelphia, 1876

The company's Grove Street complex was developed in the 1860s and 1870s. The facility was used all or in part by the company and it successors until 1943. It continues to be used for light industrial manufacturing, including specialty wire products, and was listed on the National Register of Historic Places in 1980.

The complex is located north of downtown Worcester, between Grove and Prescott Streets north of Faraday Street. It consists of thirteen brick buildings, the oldest of which was built in 1863. Located at the southern end of the complex, the Cotton Mill manufactured cotton that was used to wrap crinoline wire that was used in hoop skirts. When hoop skirts went out of fashion, the building was converted to produce wire. Originally a three-story building, it was raised to four between 1888 and 1892.

Seven buildings were built in 1869 and 1870, representing the major development of the complex. The primary focus of this expansion was the Main Mill, which is 165 feet (50 m) long, and the Long Mill, which is 196 feet (60 m). The Main Mill was originally built with three stories and a mansard-roofed fourth, which was raised to a full fourth story c. 1900. The Long Mill was originally 2.5 stories, and was raised to a full three stories in 1880.

Further buildings were built after 1878, and the existing buildings were also added to or otherwise modified, primarily in the years before 1920. The last major addition was an extension on the north end of the Long Mill in 1916.

== Absorption into U.S. Steel ==
Fred Harris Daniels, 1853–1913, native of Worcester, served as the president of Washburn and Moen from 1906 until his death, after its absorption into U.S. Steel.

== See also ==
- Georgetown Historic District (Georgetown, Connecticut): Another historic wire manufacturer
- National Register of Historic Places listings in northwestern Worcester, Massachusetts
