= Redding Center, Connecticut =

Census-designated place in Connecticut, United States

- Census-designated place
- Location within Connecticut Location within the United States
- Coordinates: 41°18′21″N 73°22′54″W
- Country: United States
- State: Connecticut
- County: Fairfield
- Town: Redding

Area
  - Total: 0.69 sq mi (1.78 km^{2})
  - Land: 0.69 sq mi (1.78 km^{2})
  - Water: 0 sq mi (0.0 km^{2})
- Elevation: 660 ft (200 m)
- Time zone: UTC-5 (Eastern (EST))
  - Summer (DST): UTC-4 (EDT)
- ZIP Code: 06896 (Redding)
- Area codes: 203/475
- FIPS code: 09-63620
- GNIS feature ID: 2805960

Redding Center is a census-designated place (CDP) in the town of Redding, Connecticut, United States, comprising the central village in the town. As of the 2020 census, Redding Center had a population of 315. Connecticut Route 107 passes through the community, leading north toward Bethel and southwest toward Georgetown. The Redding Center Historic District is at the center of the CDP, around the intersections of Cross Highway, Sanfordtown Road, Lonetown Road, and Hill Road.

Redding Center was first listed as a CDP prior to the 2020 census.
