= Topstone, Connecticut =

Census-designated place in Connecticut, United States

- Census-designated place
- Location within Connecticut Location within the United States
- Coordinates: 41°17′46″N 73°26′55″W
- Country: United States
- State: Connecticut
- County: Fairfield
- Town: Redding

Area
  - Total: 0.19 sq mi (0.48 km^{2})
  - Land: 0.19 sq mi (0.48 km^{2})
  - Water: 0 sq mi (0.0 km^{2})
- Elevation: 460 ft (140 m)
- Time zone: UTC-5 (Eastern (EST))
  - Summer (DST): UTC-4 (EDT)
- ZIP Code: 06896 (Redding)
- Area codes: 203/475
- FIPS code: 09-76400
- GNIS feature ID: 2805972

Topstone is a census-designated place (CDP) in the town of Redding, Connecticut, United States. It is on the west side of the town and is bordered to the west by the town of Ridgefield. As of the 2020 census, Topstone had a population of 113.

Topstone was first listed as a CDP prior to the 2020 census.
