= Fred Otnes =

American illustrator

- Born: Frederick Joseph Otnes Jr. December 3, 1925; Junction City, Kansas, United States
- Died: July 28, 2015 (aged 89); Westport, Connecticut, United States
- Occupations: Illustrator, painter

Frederick Joseph Otnes Jr. (December 3, 1925 – July 28, 2015) was an American illustrator. A resident of Redding, Connecticut, he was best known for his collage paintings. He was born in Junction City, Kansas and died in Westport, Connecticut.

== Articles ==
- Art in America (review, Jonathan Goodman) December 2002
- Artnews (review, Arlene McKanic) September 2002
- ARTnews (review, Mary Schneider Enriquez) December 2000
- ARTFORUM International, May 1999, pp. 180–181
- Print magazine, 1975 March–April
- Northlight, 1976 March–April
- Graphis, No. 188, 1976–77
- Communication Arts, Vol. 15, No. 3, 1973
- Idea magazine, No. 172, 1982
- Illustration in the Third Dimension-Hastings House
- Today's Art, Vol. 28, No. 5
- Typographic, Vol. 12, No. 2
- Who's Who in Graphic Art, De Clivo Press
- Step by Step magazine, Vol 5, No. 4, 1988
- World Graphic Design, Japan, 1991
- Styling magazine, Japan, 1991
- Creation magazine, 1991
- The Greatest Illustration Show of America, Japan, 1992
- Confetti magazine, May 1993
- Novum Gebrauchsgraphik, Germany, 1993
- Idea magazine, Japan, 1993
- Grafica magazine, Brazil, 1994
- Artnews magazine, February 1994
- Design magazine, Korea, 1995
