= Putnam Memorial State Park =

State park in Fairfield County, Connecticut

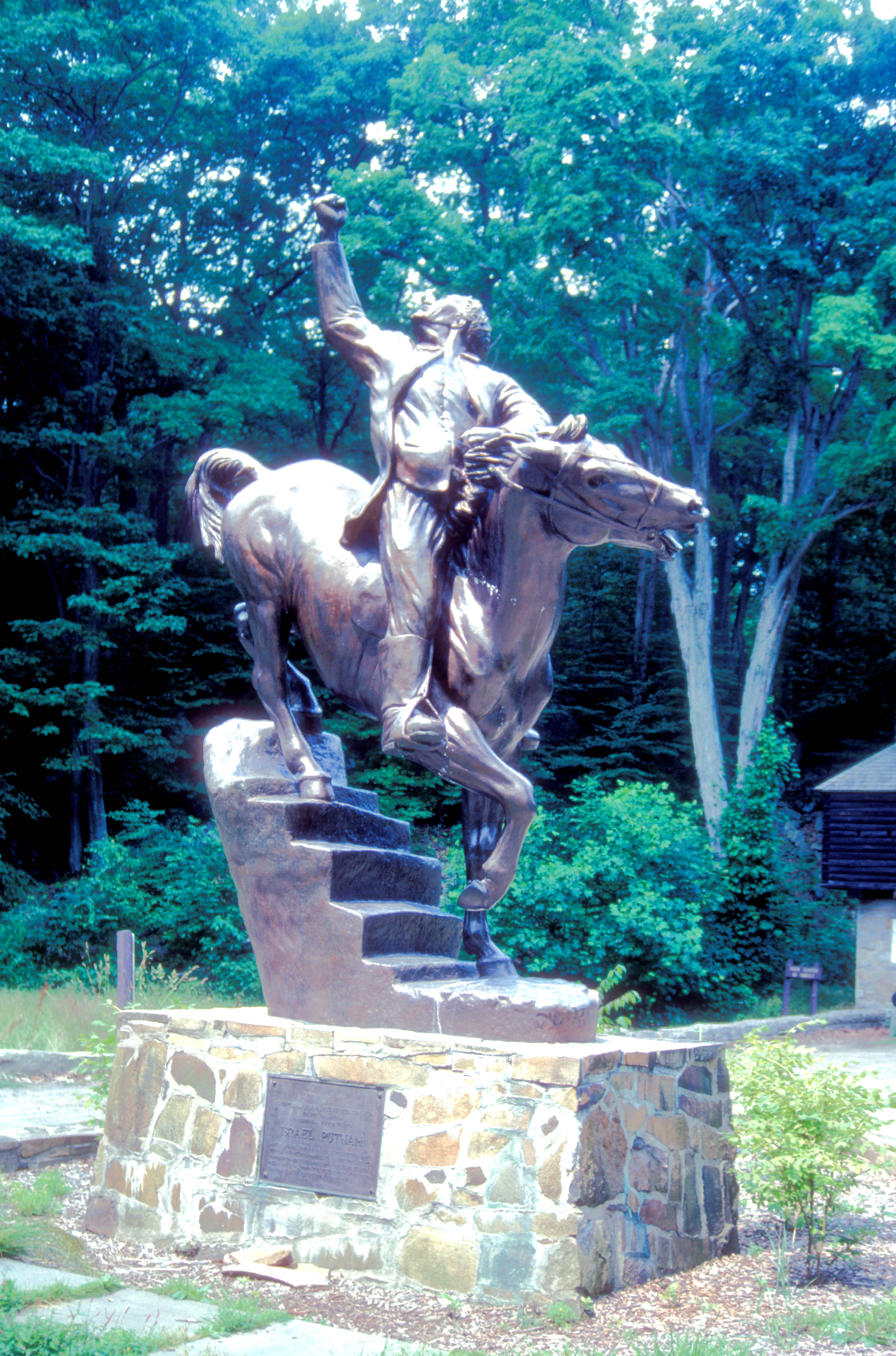
- Equestrian statue of Israel Putnam at the entrance to Putnam Memorial State Park

- Location within Connecticut Location within the United States
- Location: Redding, Connecticut, United States
- Coordinates: 41°20′23″N 73°22′45″W
- Area: 183 acres (74 ha)
- Elevation: 585 ft (178 m)-755 ft (230 m)
- Established: 1887
- Administrator: Connecticut Department of Energy and Environmental Protection
- Designation: Connecticut state park
- Website: Official website
- Putnam Memorial State Park
- U.S. National Register of Historic Places
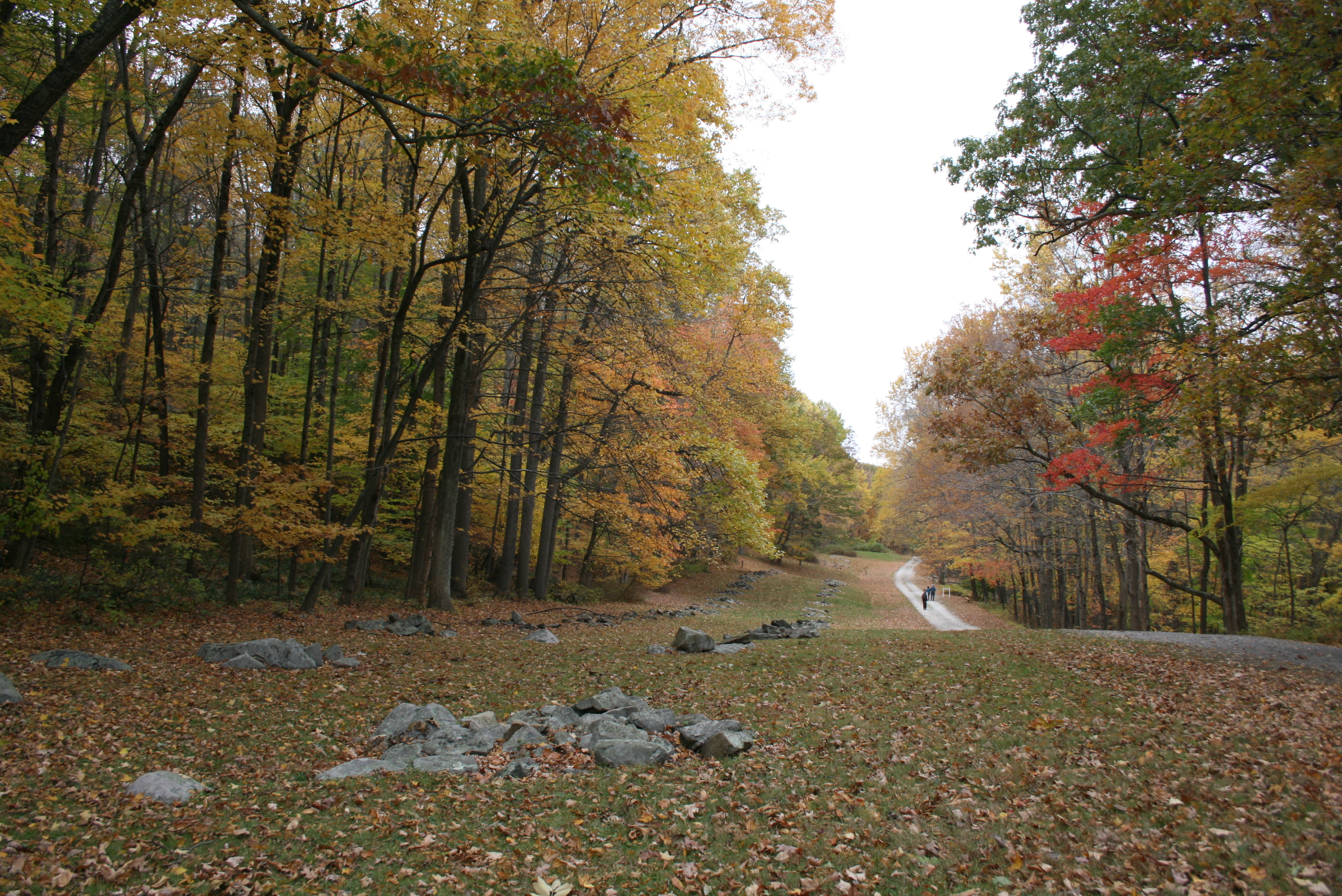
- Site of log huts on Company Street
- Location: Junction of Routes 58 (Black Rock Turnpike) and 107 (Park Road), Redding, Connecticut
- Area: 183 acres (74 ha)
- Built: 1778
- NRHP reference No.: 70000683
- Added to NRHP: December 29, 1970

Putnam Memorial State Park is a history-oriented public recreation area in the town of Redding, Connecticut. The state park preserves the site that Major General Israel Putnam chose as the winter encampment for his men in the winter of 1778/1779 during the American Revolutionary War. It is Connecticut's oldest state park, created in 1887 at the instigation of Redding town residents. The park was listed on the National Register of Historic Places in 1970.

In addition to its historic features, the park's 183 acres (74 ha) include facilities for hiking, picnicking, pond fishing, and winter sports. The park is located at the intersection of Route 107 and Route 58 and is managed by the Connecticut Department of Energy and Environmental Protection.

== History ==
Over 3,000 men were sent into winter quarters spread throughout three camps in Redding. The camps were established to keep an eye on the storehouses in Danbury, Connecticut, and to protect Long Island Sound and the Hudson River Valley. Many of these men were the same who had suffered at Valley Forge the previous winter. The 2nd Canadian Regiment, or Congress' Own, under the command of Moses Hazen and the 2nd New Hampshire Regiment under the command of Enoch Poor were stationed at this location.

Preservation of the park grounds was initiated in 1887 when Aaron Treadwell, at the encouragement of Redding historian Charles Burr Todd, sold 12.4 acres to the state for one dollar. In 1955, the Park and Forest Commission took over park management. The park was decommissioned with maintenance performed by local volunteers during most of the 1990s. It reopened under state auspices in 1997.

== Activities and amenities ==
- Visitor Center: The Visitor Center features informational kiosks about Putnam's life, the encampment, and the park's history. The building was reconstructed in 2005, using much of the material from the original pavilion structure erected in 1893.
- Museum: The museum displays artifacts found at the park as well as donated items. The exhibits demonstrate colonial life and honor the men who were stationed here.
- Putnam Statue: In 1969 at age 93, the sculptor Anna Hyatt Huntington donated the equestrian statue of General Israel Putnam which is situated at the entrance to the park. It depicts the horse going down steps. In February 1779, General Putnam escaped a cohort of British Dragoons by riding his horse down 100 stone steps at Horses Neck, Greenwich, Connecticut.
- Grounds: There are numerous firebacks, which are the remains of the enlisted soldiers' chimneys, as well as reconstructed replicas of the guard house and an officers' quarters. A 40-foot-tall (12 m) monument commemorates the commanding officers and men who were stationed here. Natural features found in the park include the rock shelter called Philip's Cave and large glacial erratics.
- Events: On alternating years, the park hosts a reenactment (every other November) or a ghost walk (every other October). A guided winter walk is held every December. Events are hosted by the organization Friends & Neighbors of Putnam Park.

== Media ==
=== Music ===
The site of Putnam's winter encampment is referenced in Putnam's Camp, Redding, Connecticut, the second movement of Three Places in New England by Charles Ives.

== See also ==
- National Register of Historic Places listings in Fairfield County, Connecticut
