= Aaron Barlow House =

Historic house in Connecticut, United States

- U.S. National Register of Historic Places
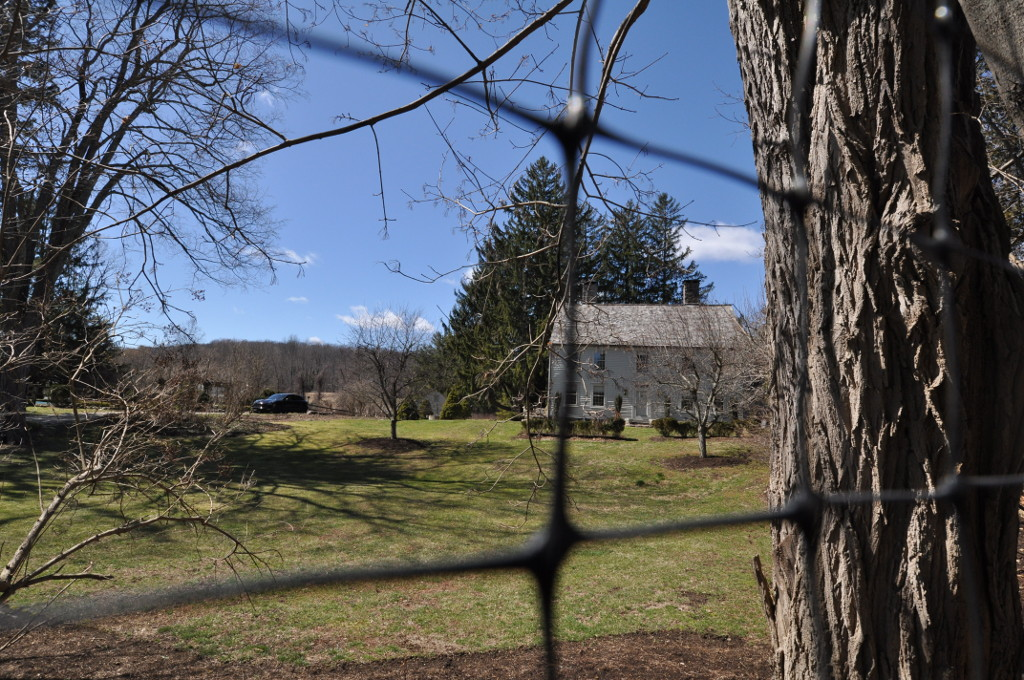

- Location within Connecticut Location within the United States
- Location: Umpawaug Road at Station Road, Redding, Connecticut
- Coordinates: 41°19′14″N 73°25′33″W
- Area: 2 acres (0.81 ha)
- Built: 1730
- Architectural style: Georgian
- NRHP reference No.: 82004347
- Added to NRHP: April 29, 1982

The Aaron Barlow House is a historic house at the corner of Umpawaug and Station Roads in Redding, Connecticut. Built in 1730, it is a fine local example of Georgian architecture, with historic association to local figures active in the American Revolutionary War. The house was listed on the National Register of Historic Places on May 29, 1982.

== Description and history ==
The Aaron Barlow House stands in a rural residential area near the village of West Redding, at the northwest corner of Umpawag and Station Roads. It is a 2 1/2-story wood-frame structure, five bays wide, with twin stone chimneys and a gabled roof. A 20th-century single-story ell extends to the rear. The exterior is finished in a combination of wooden clapboards and shingles. The main facade has sash windows arranged symmetrically around the center entrance. The door is topped by a six-light transom window and a narrow band of dentil moulding. The interior follows a central hall plan, with a wide main hall and two rooms on either side. Most of the rooms have original wide floorboards, and some of the original finish woodwork either remains in place, or has been reused during 20th-century renovations.

The house was built about 1730, and was owned by Aaron Barlow, a blacksmith, by 1750. Barlow served in the Continental Army and the Connecticut state militia during the American Revolutionary War, and later served in the state legislature. He is said to have hosted General Israel Putnam in this house on occasion. Aaron's brother Joel, noted as a poet and statesman, is said to have written one of his best-known works, The Vision of Columbus, in this house in 1787.

As of 2025, the house is now a private residence.

== See also ==
- National Register of Historic Places listings in Fairfield County, Connecticut
