= New Canaan Nature Center =

Nature preserve and garden in Connecticut, U.S.

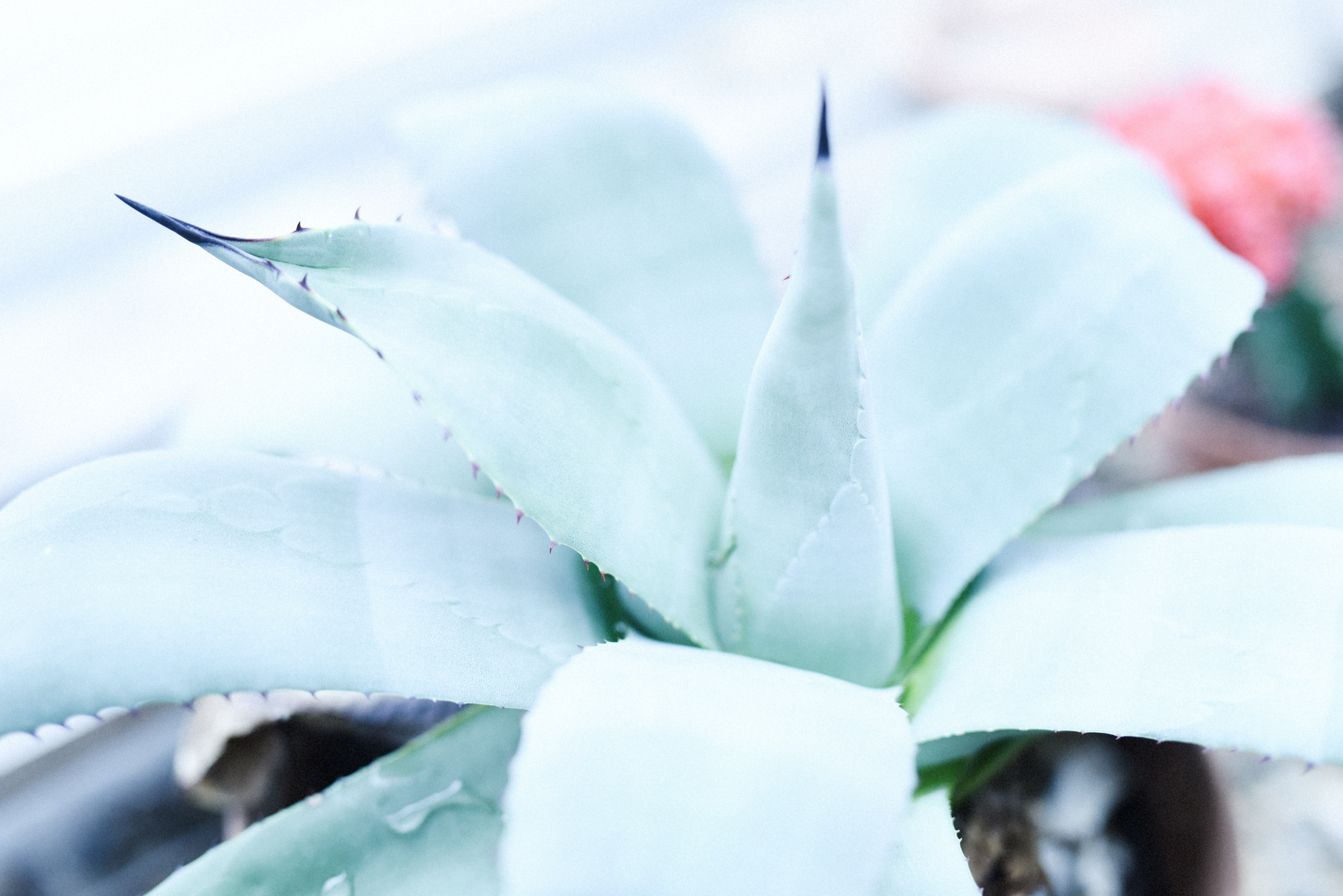
- Interactive map of New Canaan Nature Center
- Location: 144 Oenoke Ridge; New Canaan, CT, US
- Coordinates: 41°09′13″N 73°30′09″W
- Area: 40 acres (16 ha)
- Created: 1960
- Website: newcanaannature.org

The New Canaan Nature Center (40 acres or 16 hectares) is a botanical garden, arboretum and nature preserve located at 144 Oenoke Ridge, Route 124, about 0.25 miles (0.40 km) north of the center of New Canaan, Connecticut.

The nature center includes wet and dry meadows, two ponds, wet and dry woodlands, dense thickets, an old orchard, and a cattail marsh, as well as a 4,000-square-foot (370 m^{2}) greenhouse. Landscaped areas of the site include a wildflower garden (which won the 1997 Homer Lucas Landscape Award from the New England Wild Flower Society), a herb garden and a perennial border. About 90% of the plant specimens in the wildflower garden are native species, including bloodroot, columbine, mayapple, jack-in-the-pulpit, wild geranium, Solomon's plume, starflower, and trillium. Shade-loving perennials include bleeding heart, crested iris, Jacob's ladder, hepatica, European ginger and Virginia bluebells. Azaleas, rhododendrons and a stand of mountain laurel also feature.

The center also contains a small arboretum of Sciadopitys verticillata (Umbrella Pine), Chamaecyparis pisifera Squarrosa (Moss Sawara Cypress), Chamaecyparis pisifera Plumosa (Plume False Cyprus), Pinus densiflora 'Umbraculifera' (Japanese Umbrella Pine), Fagus sylvatica 'Atropunicea' (Purple Beech), Fagus sylvatica 'Pendula' (European Weeping Beech), Cercis canandensis (Eastern Redbud), Acer palmatum 'Dissectum-Pendula', Pinus cembra (Swiss Stone Pine) and Picea apies 'Repens' (Weeping Norway Spruce).

New Canaan Nature Center features many nature programs throughout the year, including the Fall Fair every October, and maple sugaring celebrations in early spring.

== Gallery ==
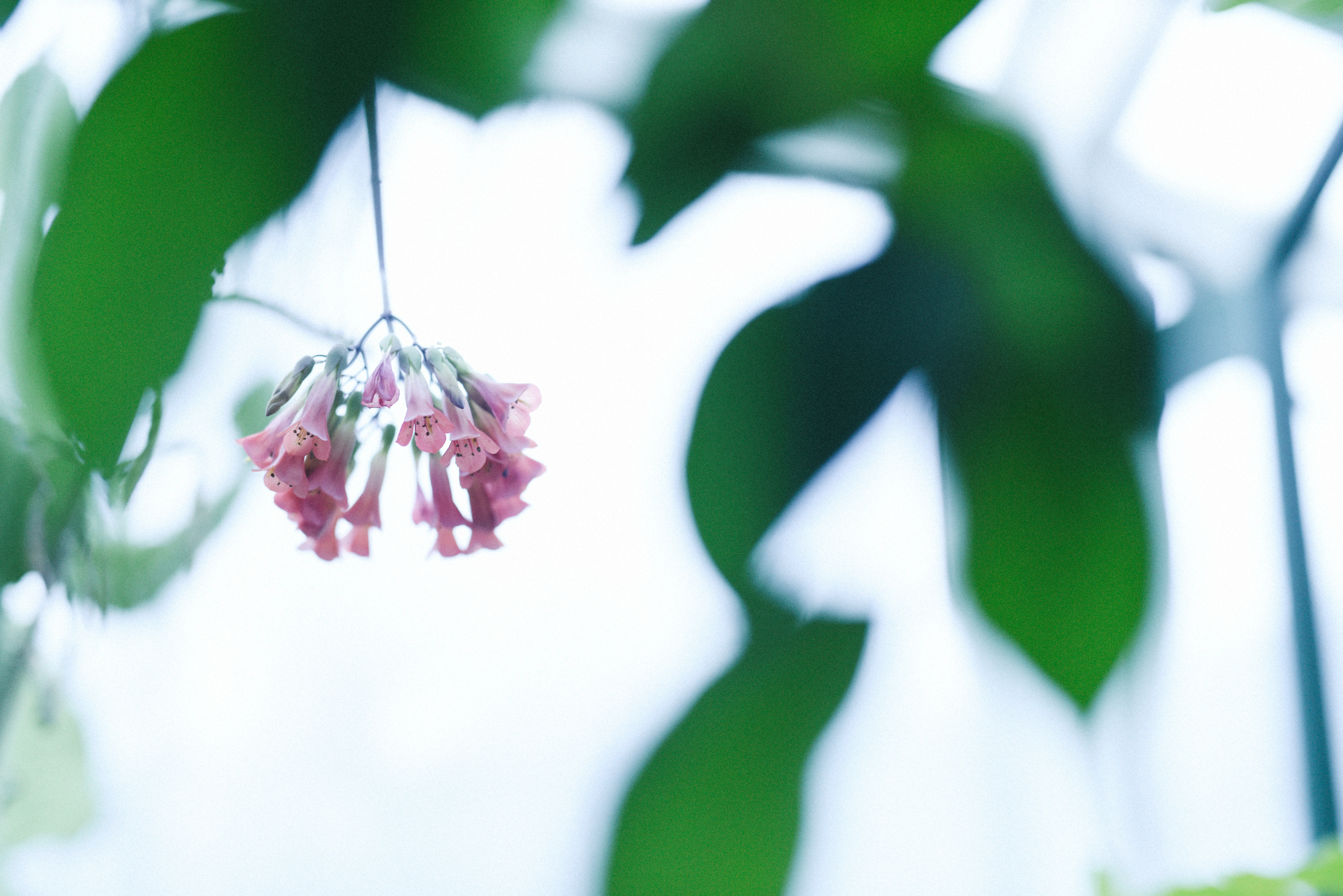
Close up of a flower in the greenhouse.

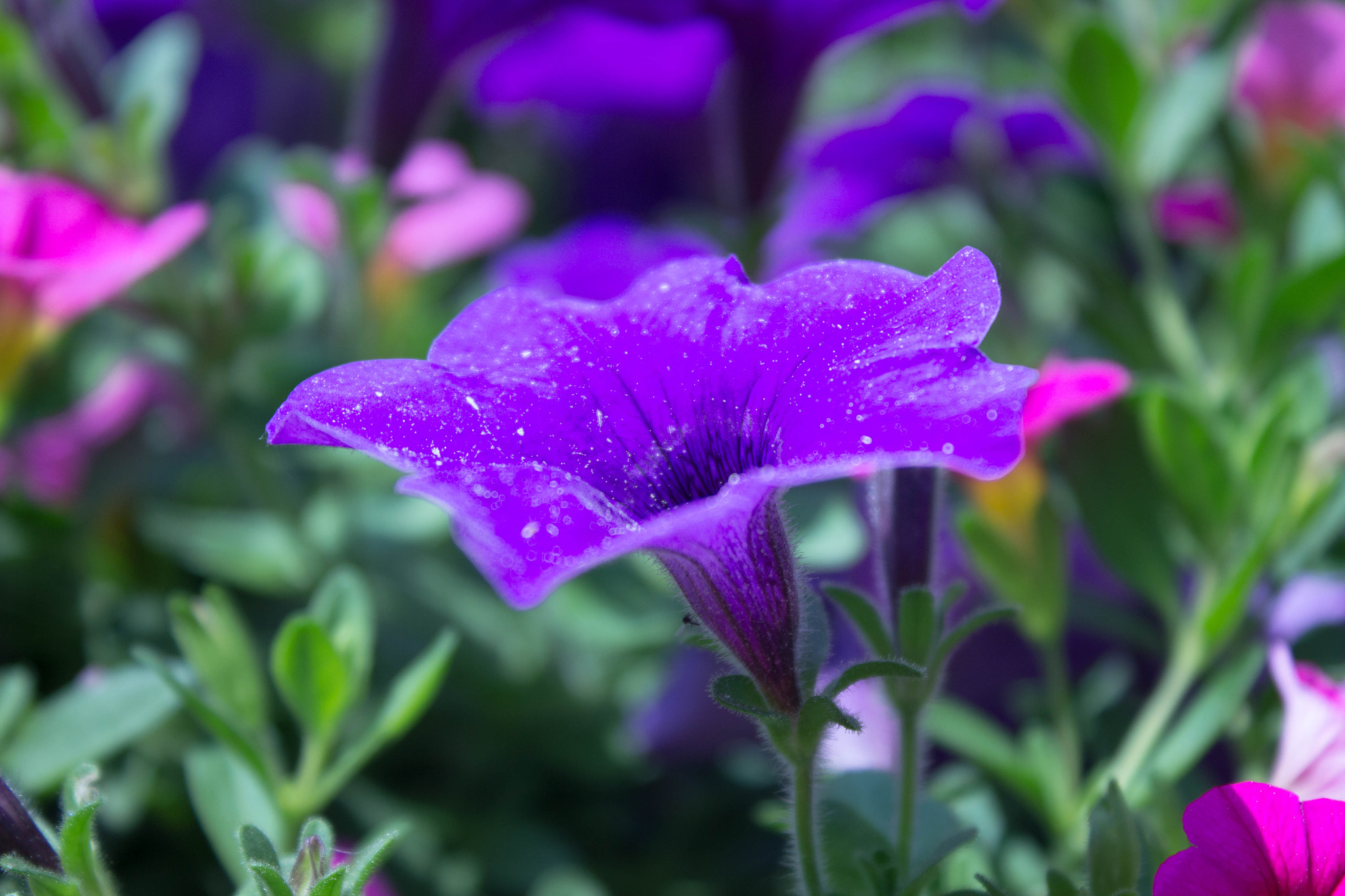

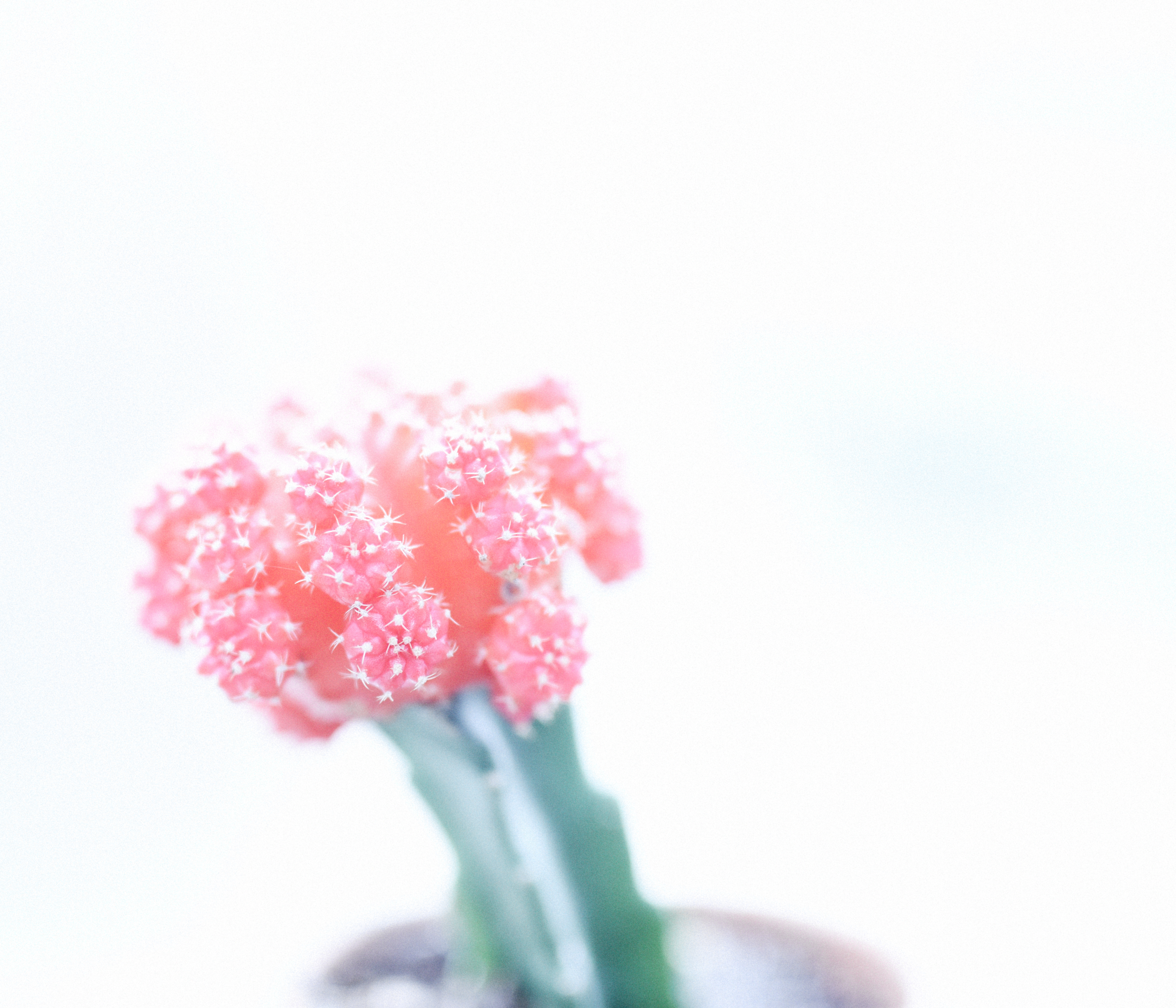
Cactus in the greenhouse interior.

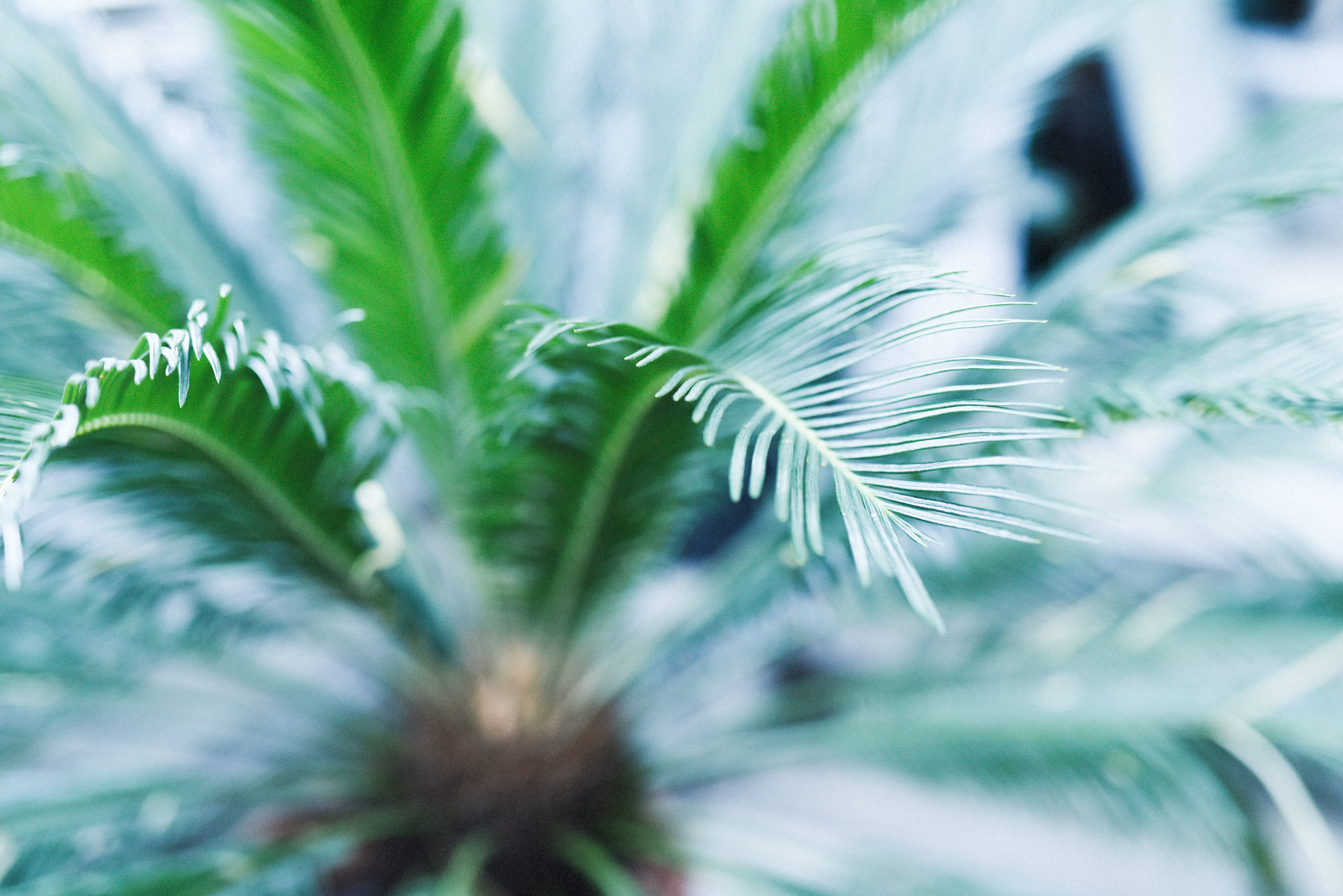
Japanese umbrella-pine (Sciadopitys verticillata).

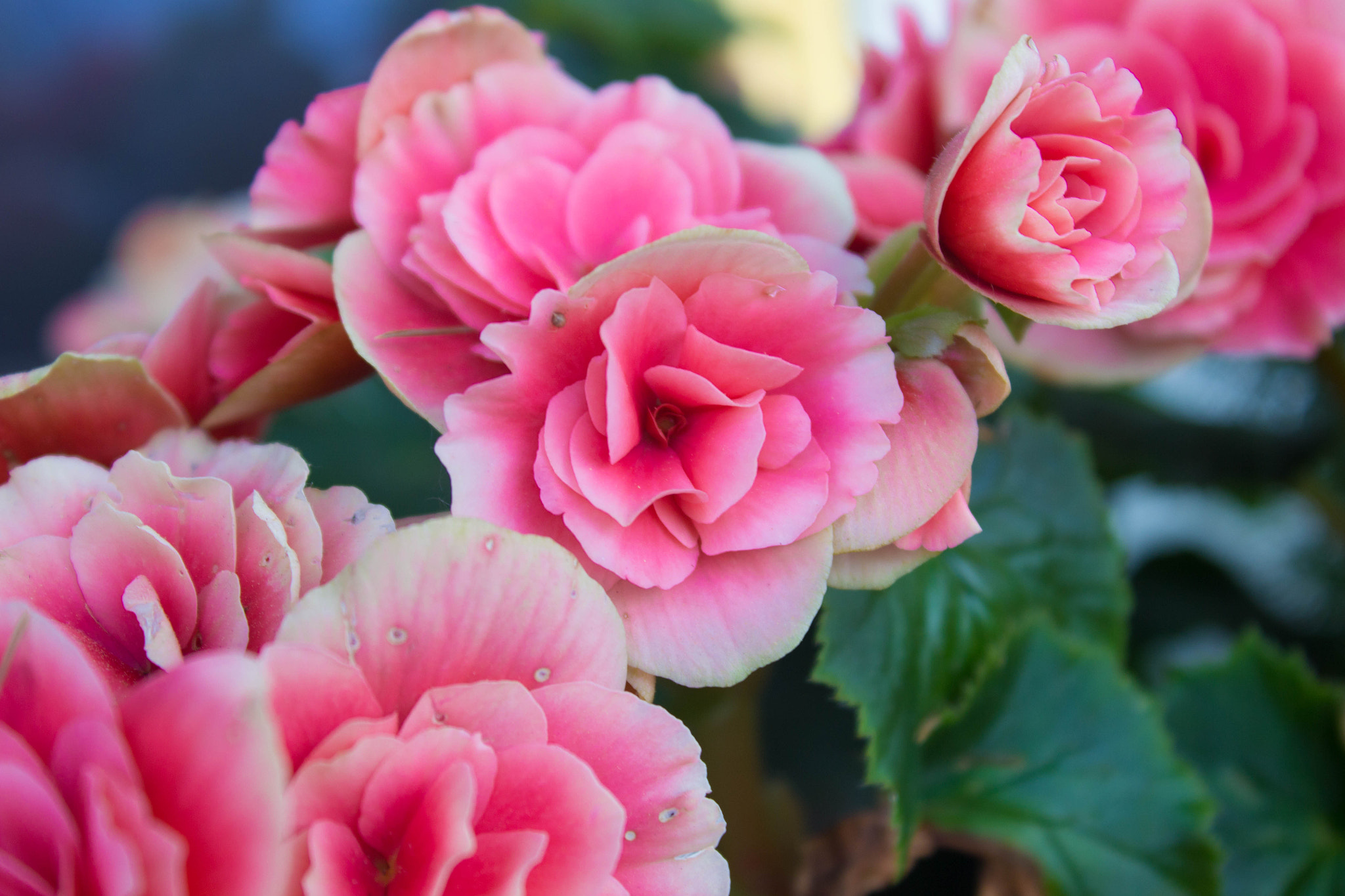

== See also ==
- List of botanical gardens in the United States
- List of nature centers in the United States
