= Westport Village, Connecticut =

Census-designated place in Connecticut, United States

- Census-designated place
- Location within Connecticut Location within the United States
- Coordinates: 41°8′28″N 73°21′28″W
- Country: United States
- State: Connecticut
- County: Fairfield
- Town: Westport

Area
  - Total: 1.37 sq mi (3.55 km^{2})
  - Land: 1.27 sq mi (3.30 km^{2})
  - Water: 0.10 sq mi (0.26 km^{2})
- Elevation: 15 ft (4.6 m)
- Time zone: UTC-5 (Eastern (EST))
  - Summer (DST): UTC-4 (EDT)
- ZIP Code: 06880 (Westport)
- Area codes: 203/475
- FIPS code: 09-83586
- GNIS feature ID: 2805094

Westport Village is a census-designated place (CDP) in the town of Westport, Connecticut, United States. It comprises the town center of Westport. As of the 2020 census, Westport Village had a population of 3,251.

Westport Village was first listed as a CDP prior to the 2020 census.

== Demographics ==
=== 2020 census ===
As of the 2020 census, Westport Village had a population of 3,251. The median age was 45.8 years. 26.5% of residents were under the age of 18 and 17.7% of residents were 65 years of age or older. For every 100 females there were 95.5 males, and for every 100 females age 18 and over there were 90.3 males age 18 and over.

100.0% of residents lived in urban areas, while 0.0% lived in rural areas.

There were 1,238 households in Westport Village, of which 36.5% had children under the age of 18 living in them. Of all households, 60.5% were married-couple households, 13.1% were households with a male householder and no spouse or partner present, and 24.0% were households with a female householder and no spouse or partner present. About 26.4% of all households were made up of individuals and 16.2% had someone living alone who was 65 years of age or older.

There were 1,367 housing units, of which 9.4% were vacant. The homeowner vacancy rate was 2.4% and the rental vacancy rate was 7.9%.

Racial composition as of the 2020 census
| Race | Number | Percent |
|---|---|---|
| White | 2,744 | 84.4% |
| Black or African American | 29 | 0.9% |
| American Indian and Alaska Native | 3 | 0.1% |
| Asian | 195 | 6.0% |
| Native Hawaiian and Other Pacific Islander | 0 | 0.0% |
| Some other race | 42 | 1.3% |
| Two or more races | 238 | 7.3% |
| Hispanic or Latino (of any race) | 183 | 5.6% |
