= Redding Center Historic District =

Historic district in Connecticut, United States

- U.S. National Register of Historic Places
- U.S. Historic district
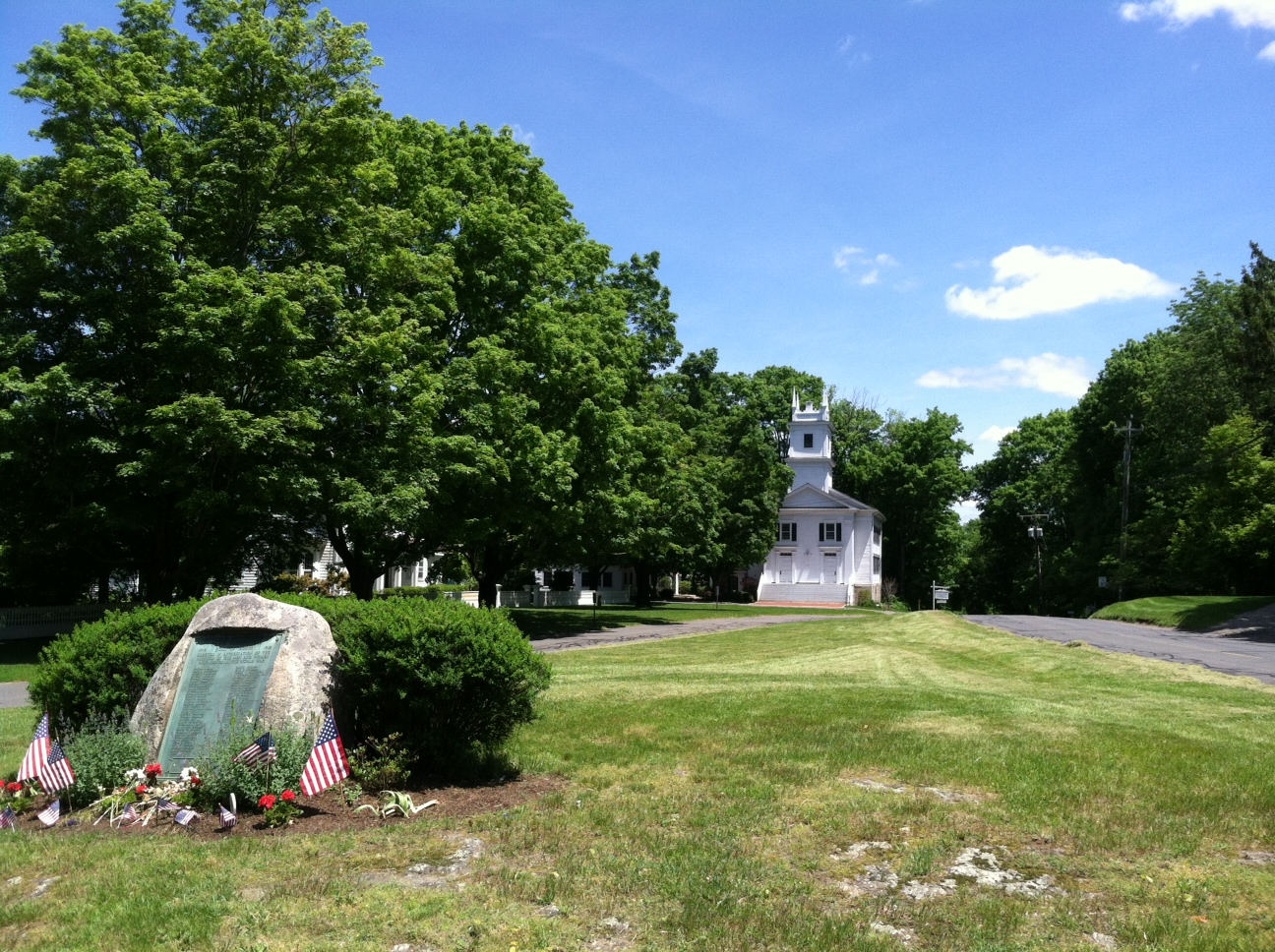
- The green and the Congregational Church

- Location within Connecticut Location within the United States
- Location: Roughly, 4-25B Cross Highway, including Read Cemetery, 61-100 Hill Road, 0-15 Lonetown Road and 118 Sanfordtown Road, Redding, Connecticut
- Coordinates: 41°18′14″N 73°22′55″W
- Area: 55 acres (22 ha)
- Architectural style: Colonial Revival, Greek Revival, Italianate
- NRHP reference No.: 92001253
- Added to NRHP: October 1, 1992

The Redding Center Historic District is a 55-acre (22 ha) located in Redding, Connecticut, encompassing its historic village center. It includes the town's current and former town halls, a church, a cemetery, private homes and barns. The district was added to the National Register of Historic Places on October 1, 1992.

The district includes 46 buildings with a mix of architectural styles, including Colonial Revival, Greek Revival, and Italianate. They form the most historically significant collection of properties in the community.

Fronting a central green is the First Church of Christ, a Congregational church built in 1837 in the Greek Revival style that was the first religious organization established in Redding, obtaining permission in 1729 from Fairfield church leaders to establish a separate parish. Also facing the green is Redding's old town hall, built in 1834 and still used today for some town functions like meetings. Redding's current town hall, police station, fire station, and the Read Cemetery, which has grave markers dating from 1786 to 1860, are also in the district.

== See also ==
- National Register of Historic Places listings in Fairfield County, Connecticut
