= Redding, Connecticut =

Town in Connecticut, United States

- Town
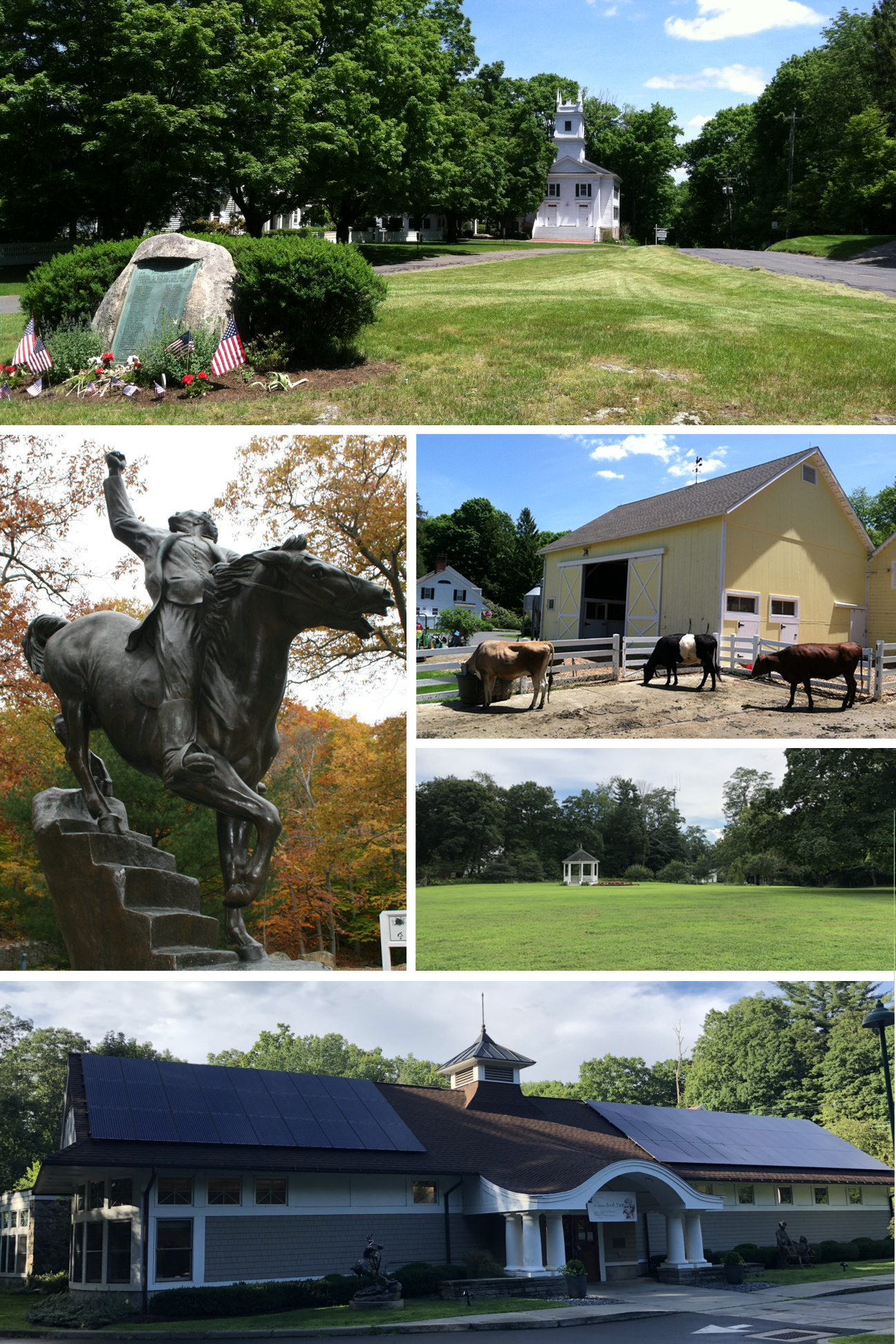
- Clockwise from top: Town Center; New Pond Farm; Redding Green; Mark Twain Library; Equestrian statue of Israel Putnam at Putnam Memorial State Park

- Seal Logo

- Coordinates: 41°18′16″N 73°23′34″W
- Country: United States
- U.S. state: Connecticut
- County: Fairfield
- Region: Western CT
- Incorporated: 1767
- Villages/Sections: Redding Center; Diamond Hill; Five Points; Georgetown (part); Redding Ridge; Sanfordtown; Topstone; West Redding

Government
  - Type: Selectman-town meeting
  - First selectman: Julia Pemberton (D)
  - Selectman: Michael Thompson (R)
  - Selectman: Peg O'Donnell (D)

Area
  - Total: 32.1 sq mi (83.1 km^{2})
  - Land: 31.5 sq mi (81.6 km^{2})
  - Water: 0.54 sq mi (1.4 km^{2})
- Elevation: 472 ft (144 m)

Population (2020)
  - Total: 8,765
  - Density: 278.3/sq mi (107.5/km^{2})
- Time zone: UTC-5 (Eastern Standard Time)
  - Summer (DST): UTC-4 (Eastern Daylight Time)
- ZIP Code: 06896
- Area codes: 203/475
- Website: www.townofreddingct.org

Redding is an incorporated town in Fairfield County, Connecticut, United States. The population was 8,765 at the 2020 census. The town is part of the Western Connecticut Planning Region.

== History ==
=== Early settlement and establishment ===
In 1639, English colonist Roger Ludlow (also referenced as Roger Ludlowe in many accounts) purchased land from local Native Americans to establish Fairfield, and in 1668 Fairfield purchased another tract of land then called Northfield, which comprised land that is now part of Redding. At the time, Native American trails crossed through portions of the area, including the Berkshire Path running north–south.

For settlement purposes, Fairfield authorities divided the newly available land into parcels dubbed "long lots" at the time, which north–south measured no more than a third of a mile wide but extended east–west as long as 15 miles. Immediately north of the long lots was a similar-sized parcel of land known as The Oblong.

There are varying accounts as to the first colonial landholder in the Redding area; multiple citations suggest a Fairfield man named Richard Osborn obtained land there in 1671, while differing on how many acres he secured. Nathan Gold, a Fairfield man who would serve as deputy governor of Connecticut from 1708 to 1723, received a land grant for 800 acres in 1681.

The first colonials to settle in the area of present-day Redding lived near a Native American village led by Chickens Warrups (also referenced as Chicken Warrups or Sam Mohawk in some accounts), whose name is included on multiple land deeds secured by settlers throughout the area.

According to Fairfield County and state records from the time Redding was formed, the original name of the town was Reading, after the town in Berkshire, England. Probably more accurately, however, town history attributes the name to John Read, an early major landholder who was a prominent lawyer in Boston as well as a former Congregationalist preacher who converted to Anglicanism. Read helped in demarcating the boundaries of the town and in getting it recognized as a parish of Fairfield in 1729. In 1767, soon after incorporation, the name was changed to its current spelling of Redding to better reflect its pronunciation.

In 1809, Congress granted Redding its first U.S. Post Office, which made official in 1844 the spelling of the town's name.

=== Revolutionary War and Continental Army encampment ===
In the years preceding the Declaration of Independence, tensions escalated in Redding between Tory loyalists and larger numbers of those supporting the resolutions of the Continental Congress, with some Tories fleeing to escape retribution. Some 100 Redding men volunteered to serve under Captain Zalmon Read in a company of the new 5th Connecticut Regiment, which participated in the siege of Quebec's Fort Saint-Jean during the autumn of 1775 before the volunteers' terms of service expired in late November.

In 1777, the Continental Congress created a new Continental Army with enlistments lasting three years. The 5th Connecticut Regiment was reformed, enlisting some men from Redding, and assigned to guard military stores in Danbury, Connecticut. Getting word of the depot, the British dispatched a force of some 2,000 soldiers to destroy the stores, landing April 26 at present-day Westport and undertaking a 23-mile march north. The column halted on Redding Ridge for a two-hour respite, with many residents having fled to a wooded, rocky area dubbed the Devil's Den. The British column resumed its march to Danbury where soldiers destroyed the supplies, then skirmished Continental Army and militia forces in Ridgefield while on the return march south.

For the winter of 1778–1779, General George Washington decided to split the Continental Army into three divisions encircling New York City, where British General Sir Henry Clinton had taken up winter quarters. Major General Israel Putnam chose Redding as the winter encampment quarters for some 3,000 regulars and militia under his command, at the site of the present-day Putnam Memorial State Park and nearby areas. The Redding encampment allowed Putnam's soldiers to guard the replenished supply depot in Danbury and support any operations along Long Island Sound and the Hudson River Valley. Some of the men were veterans of the winter encampment at Valley Forge, Pennsylvania the previous winter. Soldiers at the Redding camp endured supply shortages, cold temperatures and significant snow, with some historians dubbing the encampment "Connecticut's Valley Forge."

=== Establishment of rail service ===
Construction began in 1850 on the Danbury and Norwalk Railroad, which linked those two cities following a 23-mile route along the Norwalk River valley that passed through Redding. Regular steam-engine service commenced March 1, 1852; leading to the establishment of the Redding station in West Redding, the Sanford station in Topstone, and the Georgetown station, originally built in Wilton but later rebuilt in Redding.

=== Mining ===
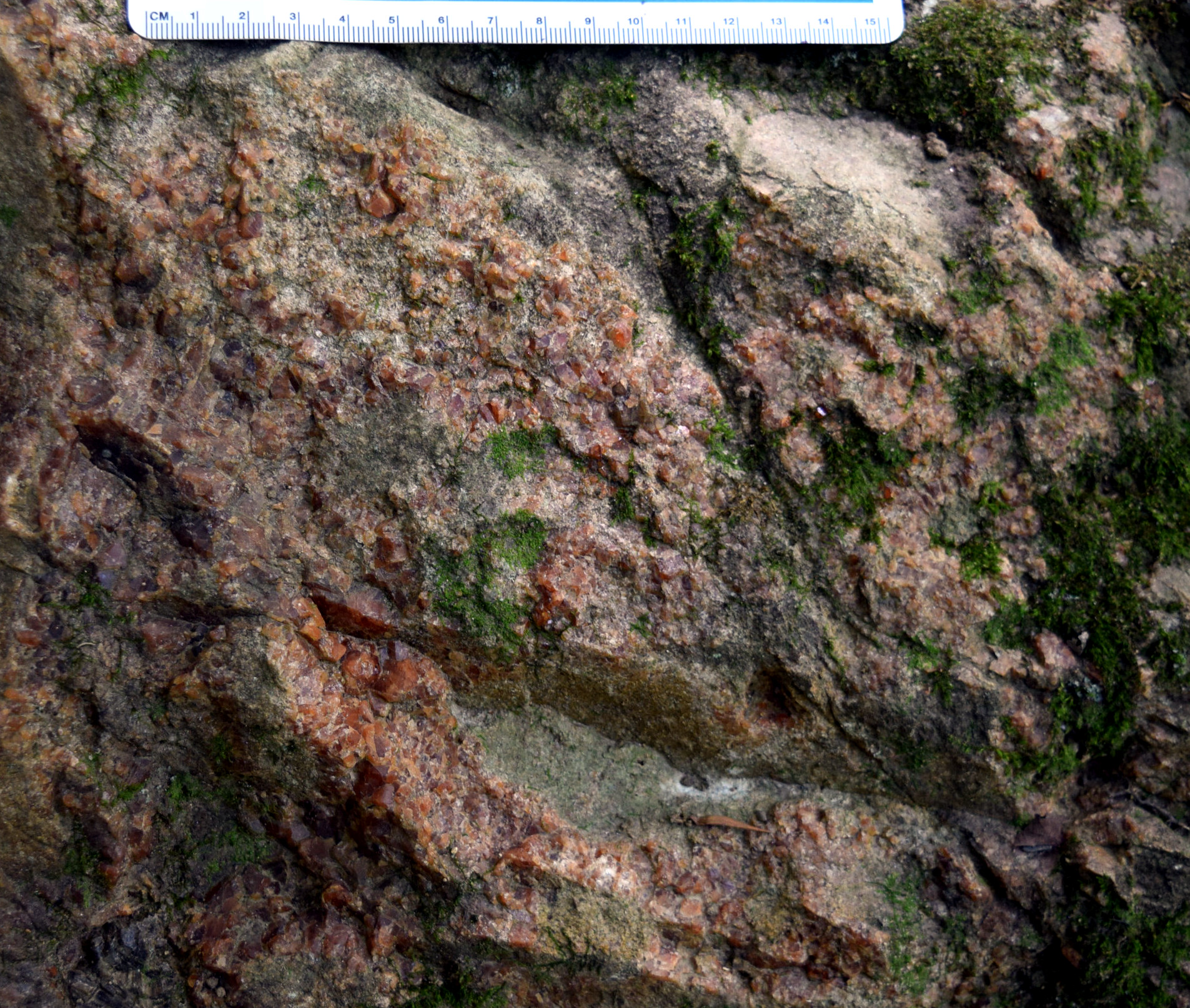
Cinnamon colored garnet rock near the train station in Redding.

In 1876, after A.N. Fillow began extracting mica in the Branchville section of Redding, two Yale University mineralogists noted the presence of previously undiscovered minerals lodged in pegmatite there and furnished funds to expand the operation. Historians say the mine produced between seven and nine minerals until then unknown, including one that was named reddingite. Over time, the mine would produce quantities of quartz, feldspar, mica, beryl, spodumene and columbite.

Another unique geological feature is the bedrock close to the train station. It is composed of nearly pure and massive garnet.

=== Gilbert & Bennett factory ===
In 1834, Gilbert & Bennett Co. purchased the site of a former comb mill alongside the Norwalk River in the Georgetown section of Redding, and began producing wire mesh cloth for varying uses, in time to include sieves and window screens. In 1863, Gilbert & Bennett built a facility at the site for drawing metal wire. During World War I, the U.S. military adapted the company's products for camouflage netting, gas masks and trench liners; and during World War II, for signal corps uses.

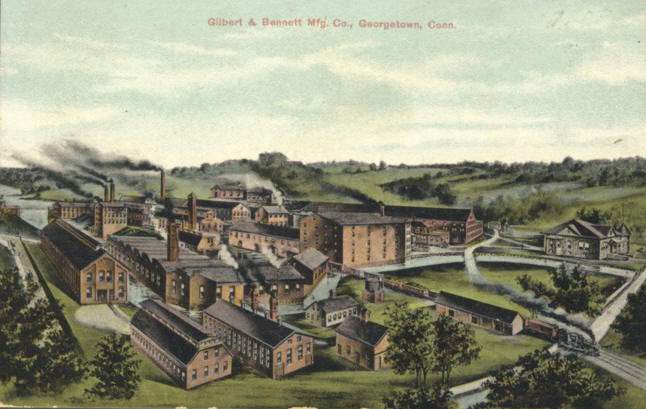
Gilbert & Bennett in Georgetown, Connecticut.

A private equity group purchased the company in 1985, and began relocating operations elsewhere. In 1987, the Gilbert & Bennett site was included as part of the Georgetown Historic District listing on the National Register of Historic Places.

In a 1987 nomination document for the National Register of Historic Places, proponents cited Gilbert & Bennett as an "anachronism" in the history of U.S. industry and labor.

"Peaceful, tree-lined residential streets converge on a functioning industrial complex; well-preserved historic houses stand cheek-by-jowl with modern factories; the deteriorated slum neighborhoods associated with modern industry do not exist," the nomination states. "The elite of Georgetown, almost exclusively people associated with Gilbert and Bennett, lived in the midst of their workers. The predictable ethnic neighborhoods did exist in Georgetown, outside the district for the most part, but their employees were apparently encouraged to occupy, or build houses next to the mansions of the managers and officers."

In 1999, the U.S. Environmental Protection Agency designated the factory pond and surrounding land a federal Superfund site to spur the remediation of pollution there. Multiple developers have since attempted to finance the construction of a village development at the Gilbert & Bennett site, to include a mix of residential and commercial buildings.

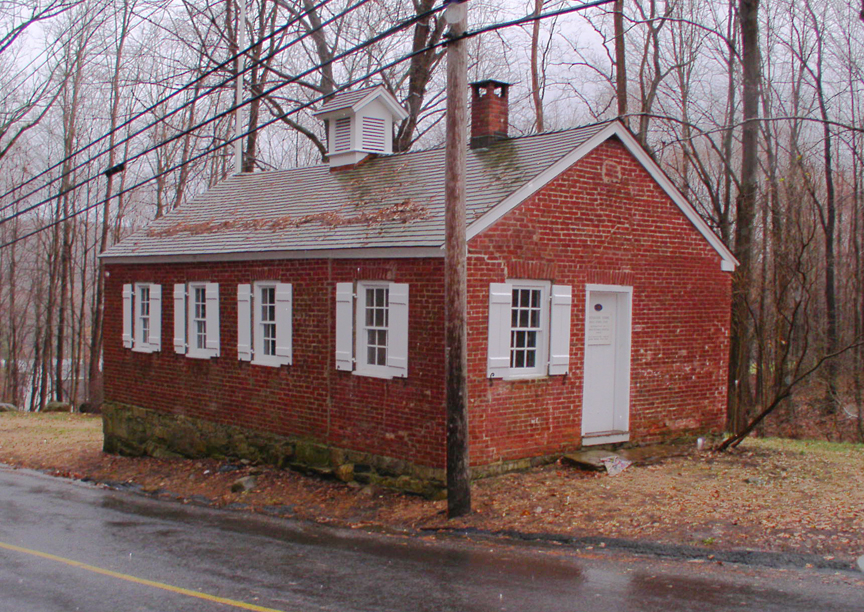
Umpawaug District School

== Geography ==
According to the United States Census Bureau, Redding has a total area of 32.1 square miles (83 km^{2}), of which 31.5 square miles (82 km^{2}) is land and 0.6 square miles (1.6 km^{2}), or 1.75%, is water. Redding borders Bethel, Danbury, Easton, Newtown, Ridgefield, Wilton and Weston.

Redding has nine primary sections: Redding Center, Redding Ridge, Poverty Hollow, Sunset Hill, Lonetown, West Redding, Branchville, West Redding River Delta, and Georgetown, the last of which is situated at the junction of Redding, Ridgefield, Weston and Wilton. Many of these sections have various subdistricts, such as Little Boston in Branchville, Redding Glen in Redding Ridge, and Umpawaug in West Redding.

=== Topography ===
Redding's topography is dominated by three ridges, running north to south, with intervening valleys featuring steep slopes and rocky ledges in some sections. The highest elevation is about 830 feet above sea level, on Sunset Hill in the northeast part of the town; and the low elevation is about 290 feet above sea level at the Saugatuck Reservoir along the southern border.

Four streams flow south through Redding toward Long Island Sound: the Aspetuck River, the Little River, the Norwalk River and the Saugatuck River.

The Saugatuck River flows through the Saugatuck Reservoir, Redding's largest body of water which stretches south into Weston. The reservoir was created in 1938 through the flooding of a portion of the Saugatuck River Valley.

=== Weather events ===
Hurricane Sandy with tropical storm-force winds reached Connecticut October 29, 2012, toppling trees throughout the town and cutting power to 98 percent of homes and businesses.

Sandy was the third storm to cause extensive electrical outages and property damage in Redding and Connecticut within the space of just over 14 months, along with Hurricane Irene in August 2011 and the so-called "Halloween nor'easter" in late October that year. The nor'easter dropped extensive snow onto trees that still had foliage, resulting in an increased number of snapped branches and trunks that damaged property and power lines, with some areas not seeing electricity restored for 11 days.

Beginning October 15, 1955, heavy rains caused flooding along the Norwalk River and other Connecticut waterways. The flood of 1955 resulted in a dam failing at the Gilbert and Bennett factory and the inundation of the Georgetown neighborhood, amid other damage to property and infrastructure.

A 1938 hurricane known as "the Long Island Express" destroyed crops in Redding, but western Connecticut was spared the brunt of the storm that was the most destructive in New England recorded history.

The Great Blizzard of 1888 (also known as the Great White Hurricane of 1888) buried Redding under significant snow in March that year, with one resident recollecting horses and cows "stood to their middles" in snow.

=== Climate ===
The town is in a humid continental climate zone (Köppen climate classification: Dfa), with cold, snowy winters and hot, humid summers and four distinct seasons. The United States Department of Agriculture places Redding in plant hardiness zone 6b. Summer high temperatures average in the lower 80s Fahrenheit (upper 20s Celsius), with lows averaging in the lower 60s F (upper 10s C).

== Demographics ==
Historical population
Census	Pop.	Note	%±
1790	1,503		—
1800	1,632		8.6%
1810	1,717		5.2%
1820	1,678		−2.3%
1830	1,686		0.5%
1840	1,674		−0.7%
1850	1,754		4.8%
1860	1,652		−5.8%
1870	1,624		−1.7%
1880	1,540		−5.2%
1890	1,546		0.4%
1900	1,426		−7.8%
1910	1,617		13.4%
1920	1,315		−18.7%
1930	1,599		21.6%
1940	1,758		9.9%
1950	2,037		15.9%
1960	3,359		64.9%
1970	5,590		66.4%
1980	7,272		30.1%
1990	7,927		9.0%
2000	8,270		4.3%
2010	9,158		10.7%
2020	8,765		−4.3%
Population 1774–2000

As of the census of 2010, there were 9,158 people, 3,470 households, and 2,593 families residing in the town. Redding has the third lowest population density in Fairfield County at 285.3 people per square mile (110.2/km^{2}). Between 2000 and 2010, Redding's population increased 10.7%.

There were 3,811 housing units as of 2010, up 23.5% from a decade earlier, for an average density of 118.7 units per square mile (45.8/km^{2}).

The racial makeup of the town as of 2010 was 94.90% White, 0.70% African American, 0.10% Native American, 2.20% Asian, 2.10% from other races or from two or more races. Hispanic or Latino of any race were 2.60% of the population.

Of 3,470 households, 35.4% had children under the age of 18 living with them, 66.1% were married couples living together, 6.3% had a female householder with no husband present, and 25.3% were non-families. Individuals comprised 21.3% of all households, and 12.1% had someone living alone who was 65 years of age or older. The average household size was 2.63 and the average family size was 3.07.

In the town, the population was spread out, with 26.0% under the age of 18, 3.2% from 18 to 24, 16.3% from 25 to 44, 36.2% from 45 to 64, and 16.8% who were 65 years of age or older. The median age was 46.4 years. For every 100 females, there were 92.6 males. For every 100 females age 18 and over, there were 89.4 males.

The median income for a household in 2000 was $104,137, and the median income for a family was $109,250. In 2009, the median family income rose to $141,609. Males had a median income of $77,882 versus $52,250 for females. The per capita income for the town was $50,687. About 1.2% of families and 1.8% of the population were below the poverty line, including 2.1% of those under age 18 and 3.5% of those age 65 or over.

== Economy ==
Redding Lifecare, which in 2001 opened a retirement community called Meadow Ridge, was Redding's largest private-sector employer as of 2013 with 325 workers; and the largest property holder as ranked by property taxes paid, according to data published by the Connecticut Economic Resource Center (CERC). As of 2013, the town's next largest organizational taxpayers were Northeast Utilities subsidiary Connecticut Light & Power, which in 2015 became known as Eversource Energy; the Redding Country Club; and Aquarion Water Co.

In 2013, 260 organizations in Redding employed 1,678 people, according to the most recent data posted by CERC. Retail sales tax revenue totaled $75.3 million from 433 entities that reported receipts, according to the Connecticut Department of Revenue Services.

== Arts and culture ==
=== On the National Register of Historic Places ===
- Aaron Barlow House
- Daniel and Esther Bartlett House
- Georgetown Historic District
- Putnam Memorial State Park
- Redding Center Historic District
- Umpawaug District School

=== On the Connecticut Historic Resource Inventory ===
The Connecticut Historic Resource Inventory lists 230 structures in Redding, the oldest built in 1710 by early settler Moses Knapp. The Town of Redding lists another 285 structures that are believed to have been built before 1901 that are not listed in the Connecticut Historic Resource Inventory, the oldest built in 1711 by John Read.

=== Attractions and landmarks ===
- Collis P. Huntington State Park with trails for hiking, biking and horseback riding
- Devil's Den Preserve, with trails and views of the Saugatuck Reservoir
- Highstead, an arboretum that cultivates plants in their natural setting, rather than for display
- Ives Trail, hiking trail that traverses part of Redding
- Lonetown Farm Museum, headquarters of the Redding Historical Society
- New Pond Farm, a working farm founded by actress Carmen Mathews that offers camps for children, including disadvantaged youth
- Mark Twain Library, endowed by Redding's most famous resident of 1908–1910
- Putnam Memorial State Park, site of "Connecticut's Valley Forge" during the American Revolutionary War
- John Cambria Homestead, one of the many historical houses built around the time of the American Revolutionary War

=== Visual arts ===
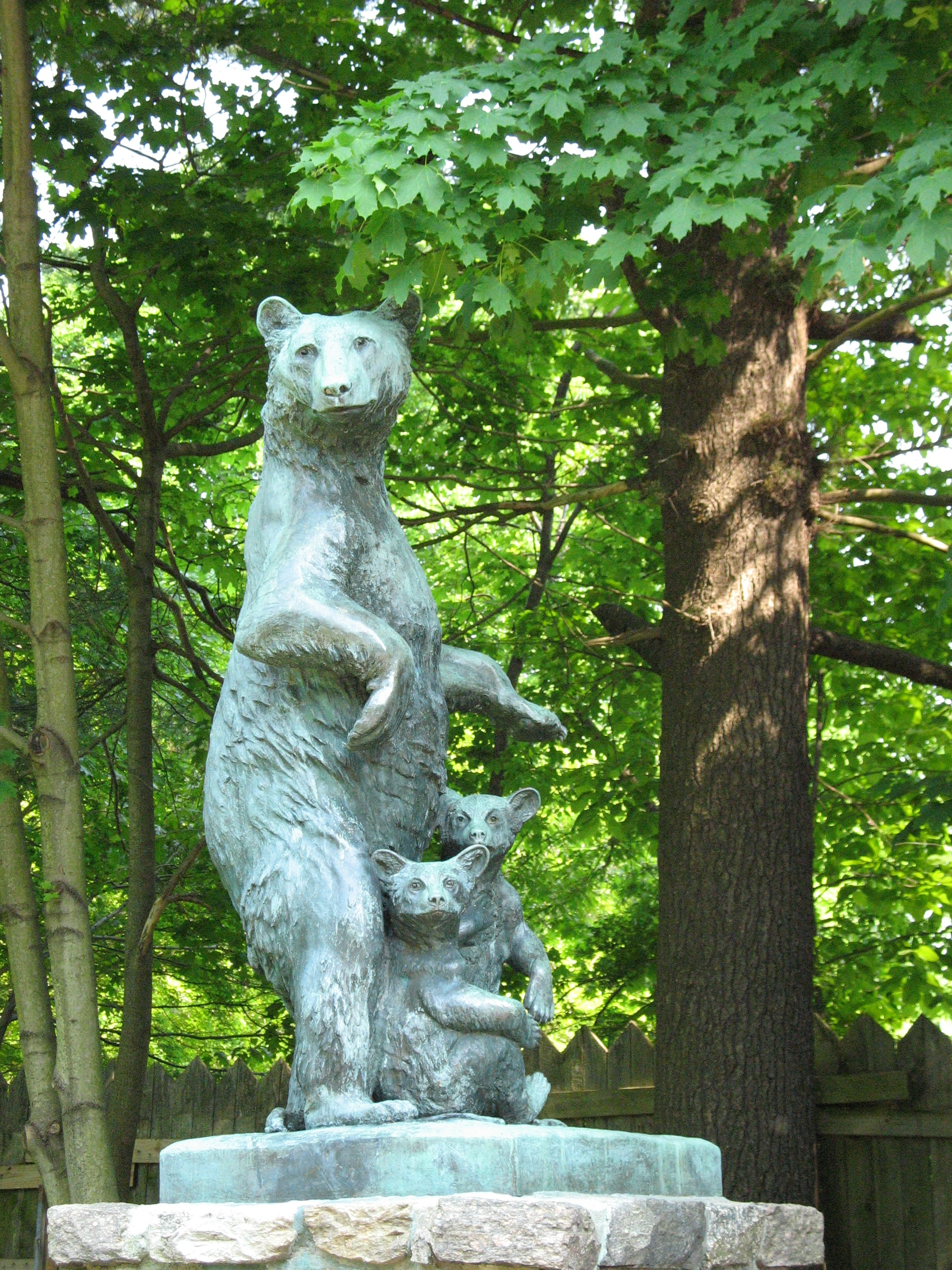
Mother Bear and Cubs, Huntington State Park, Redding, Connecticut

Multiple works by the sculptor Anna Hyatt Huntington are on display in Redding, including "Mother Bear and Cubs" and "Sculpture of Wolves" at the entrance to Collis P. Huntington State Park; "General Israel Putnam" at the entrance to Putnam Memorial State Park; "Fighting Stallions" at Redding Elementary School; "A Tribute to the Workhorse" at John Read Middle School; and a smaller version of "The Torch Bearers" at the Mark Twain Library, the original on display in Madrid, Spain.

In its collections, catalogs and archives, the Smithsonian Institution lists at least eight artistic works depicting Redding or located there: Huntington's "Fighting Stallions," "Israel Putnam," "Mother Bear and Cubs" and "Sculpture of Wolves"; the paintings "Landscape, Redding Centre" and "Redding Centre, Conn." by Oronzio Maldarelli; the painting "Rainstorm - Cider Mill at Redding, Connecticut" by George Harvey; and the photo print "Burlingame Garden", photographer not listed.

Redding Ridge artist Dennis Luzak designed a block of commemorative stamps titled "International Youth Year" and issued October 7, 1985, by the U.S. Postal Service. West Redding artist Fred Otnes designed five stamps issued April 22, 2008, depicting journalists.

Mark Twain Library holds an annual art show as a fundraiser, which draws artists from throughout the Northeast to exhibit works, and displays varying works of art and historic objects throughout the year. In 2008, the library received on loan the Gary Lee Price sculpture "Ever the Twain Shall Meet," depicting Twain in the company of Tom Sawyer and Becky Thatcher, two fictional characters he created.

=== Performing arts ===
The composer Charles Ives titled the second movement of his "Three Places in New England (Orchestral Set No. 1)" as "Putnam's Camp, Redding Connecticut." The composition is renowned for Ives attempt to produce an auditory experience akin to that experienced by a child at a parade, borrowing elements of several patriotic songs including "Yankee Doodle Dandy" and employing orchestral techniques to approximate the parade experience, for instance the sound of a band approaching while playing a song even as another recedes into the distance playing a different tune.

Composer Paul Avgerinos won the 2016 Grammy Award for best new age artist for his album "Grace".

Redding sponsors free "Concerts on the Green" Sundays from June to August, which draw varied music acts from throughout the area.

=== Mark Twain Library ===
Samuel Clemens (known by his pen name Mark Twain), who lived in Redding from 1908 until his death in 1910, contributed the first books for what would become the Mark Twain Library. The Mark Twain Library Association has retained some 200 of the original 3,000 volumes Clemens donated, along with other artifacts he owned.

== Government ==
Redding has an open town meeting form of government. A three-person, popularly elected board of selectmen performs day-to-day administration of the town, with executive authority vested in the first selectman. Legislative authority is vested in the Town Meeting. All town residents aged 18 and over who own property worth at least $1,000 can participate in the Town Meeting, which is held on an as needed basis.

Municipal elections are held every odd-numbered year. In addition to the board of selectmen, other elected town positions include the town clerk, treasurer, tax collector, constables, and members of various boards. In 2013, Democrat Julia Pemberton was elected first selectman, replacing Republican Natalie Ketcham who did not run for reelection after holding the position since 1999.

Redding is part of Connecticut's 4th congressional district and is currently represented by Democratic U.S. Representative Jim Himes.

The town is included in Connecticut's 26th Senatorial District, held by State Senator Ceci Maher, a Democrat. Portions of Redding are in Connecticut's 135th Assembly District, held by State Representative Anne Hughes, a Democrat; and Connecticut's 2nd Assembly District, held by State Representative Raghib Allie-Brennan, a Democrat.

Federally, Redding is the only town in Fairfield County to have voted against Republican George W. Bush in 2004 after voting for him in 2000.

Voter registration and party enrollment as of October 19, 2026
Party	Active voters	Inactive voters	Total voters	Percentage
Democratic	2,603	173	2,776	38.8%
Republican	1,494	84	1,578	22.1%
Unaffiliated	2,486	190	2,676	37.4%
Minor parties	112	13	125	1.7%
Total	6,695	460	7,155	100%

== Education ==
=== Public schools ===
Joel Barlow High School, opened in 1959 and expanded in 1971, serves both Redding and Easton and is designated Regional School District 09 by the state of Connecticut. John Read Middle School, opened in 1966 and expanded in 1999, educates Redding students from fifth through eighth grade and was named a National Blue Ribbon School in 2012, among 269 schools nationally that year to receive the designation. Redding Elementary School, opened in 1948 and expanded in 1957, educates students from pre-kindergarten to fourth grade.

== Media ==
=== Movies filmed in part in Redding ===
- The Last House on the Left (1972) – directorial debut of Wes Craven
- Old Dogs (2007–2008) – filmed in Redding Community Center, Putnam Park
- Other People's Money (1991) – filmed in Georgetown
- Rachel, Rachel (1968) – filmed in Georgetown, directorial debut of Paul Newman
- Reckless (1995) – filmed in Georgetown
- Revolutionary Road
- The Stepford Wives (1975)
- Valley of the Dolls (1967) – filmed in Redding Center

== Infrastructure ==
=== Transportation ===
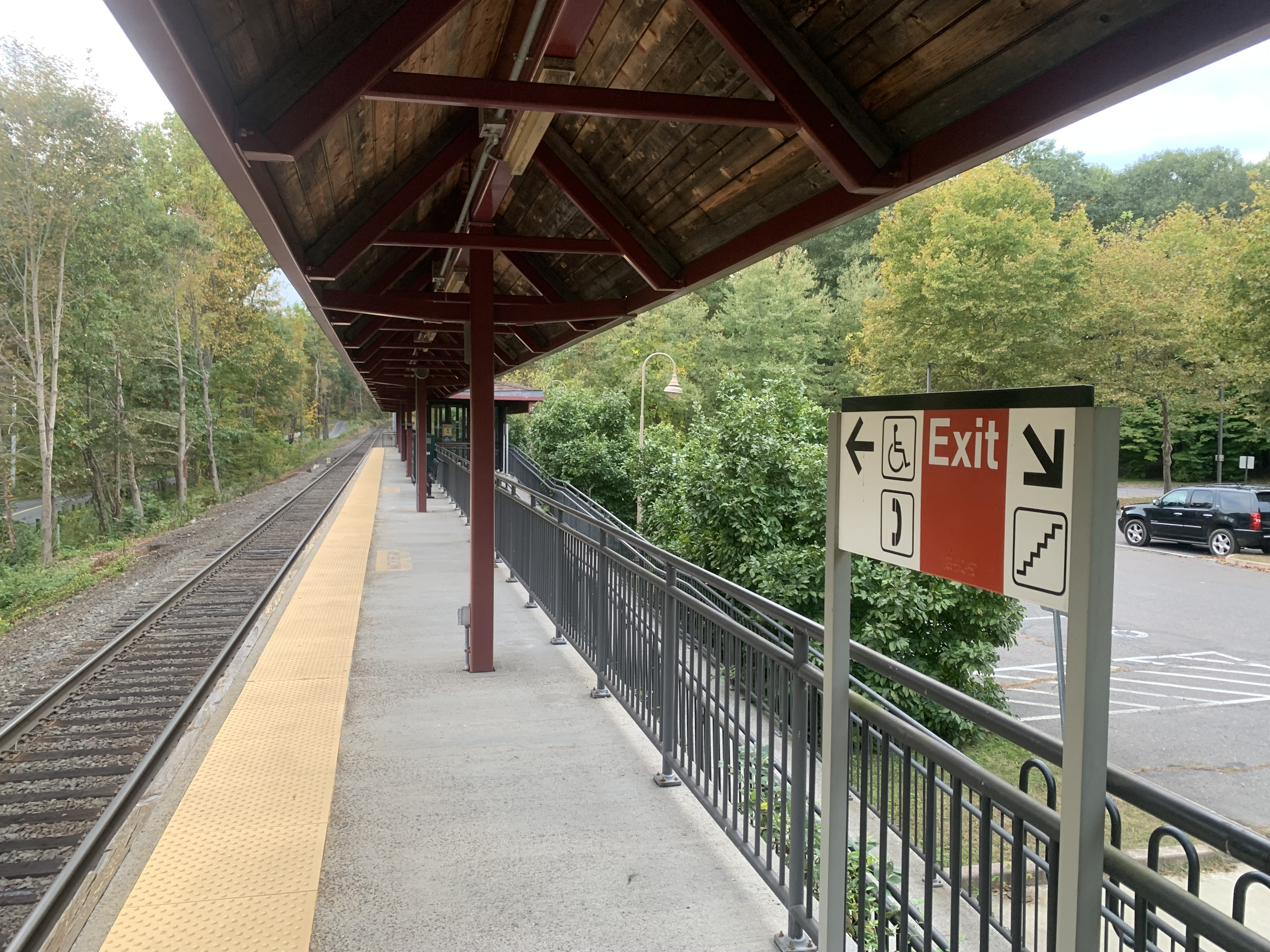
Redding station, October 2024.

Metro-North Railroad's Danbury Branch has a station at West Redding. The Danbury Branch provides commuter rail service between Danbury, to South Norwalk, Stamford, and Grand Central Terminal in New York City. Housatonic Area Regional Transit provides local bus service.

== Notable people ==
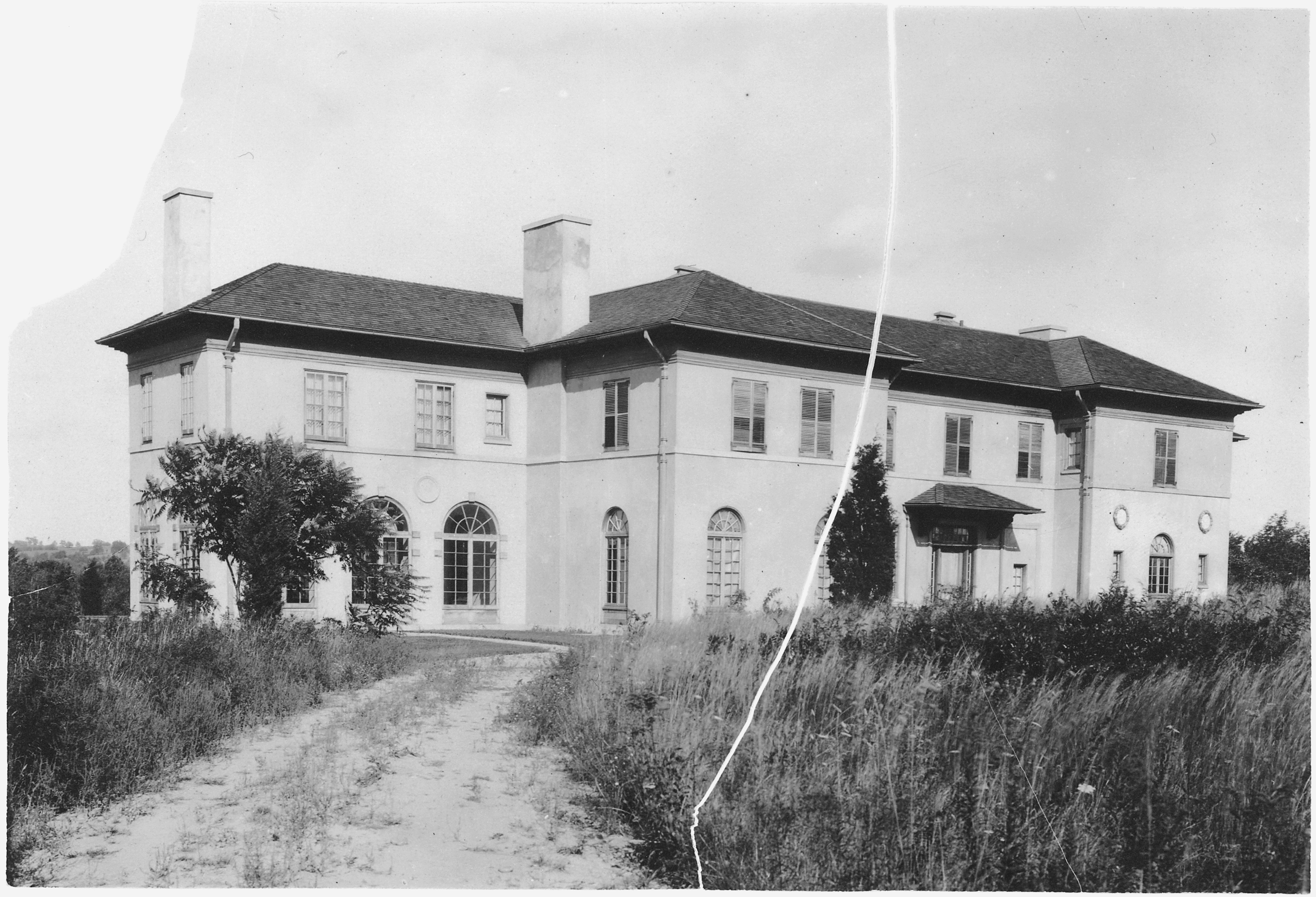
Clemens' house, "Stormfield", in Redding, Connecticut

== In popular culture ==
=== Literature ===
Mark Twain: A Biography was authored by West Redding resident Albert Bigelow Paine after interviews with Samuel Clemens at his Stormfield residence, along with subsequent books on Clemens' life.

My Brother Sam Is Dead, authored by James Lincoln Collier and Christopher Collier and named a Newbery Honor Book in 1975, was set in Redding during the Revolutionary War.
