= Georgetown, Connecticut =

Census-designated place in Connecticut, United States

- Census-designated place
- Location in Fairfield County and the state of Connecticut.
- Coordinates: 41°15′24″N 73°26′1″W
- Country: United States
- U.S. state: Connecticut
- County: Fairfield
- Region: Western CT
- NECTA: Bridgeport-Stamford-Norwalk
- Towns: Redding, Weston, Wilton, Ridgefield

Area
  - Total: 2.89 sq mi (7.5 km^{2})
  - Land: 2.87 sq mi (7.4 km^{2})
  - Water: 0.02 sq mi (0.052 km^{2})
- Elevation: 354 ft (108 m)

Population (2020)
  - Total: 1,832
  - Density: 638/sq mi (246/km^{2})
- Time zone: UTC-5 (Eastern (EST))
  - Summer (DST): UTC-4 (EDT)
- ZIP code: 06829
- Area code: 203
- FIPS code: 09-30540
- GNIS feature ID: 0207283

Georgetown is a census-designated place in Fairfield County, Connecticut, United States. It is located in the area where the towns of Wilton, Redding and Weston meet. Prior to a 1950 vote, Branchville, a neighborhood in the town of Ridgefield, was also included as part of Georgetown; some Branchville residents still share the Georgetown 544 area code.

Georgetown and its surrounding area are also defined as the Georgetown census-designated place (CDP). As of the 2020 census, the population of the CDP was 1,832.

Georgetown is located at the southwest corner of the town of Redding, the northwest corner of the town of Weston, and the northeast corner of the town of Wilton. Georgetown residents officially live in and pay local taxes to one of these three towns, but typically identify themselves as living in Georgetown. Georgetown has its own fire district, which also serves the surrounding rural areas not traditionally included in Georgetown, and its own ZIP code (06829).

== Historic district ==
On April 9, 1987, the central portion of Georgetown was listed on the U.S. National Register of Historic Places as the Georgetown Historic District. A map shows its approximate location within Georgetown. The historic district is an area of 90 acres (360,000 m^{2}) that includes the Gilbert and Bennett manufacturing plant, institutional housing built for the plant workers, and other private homes. The district includes portions of Georgetown in the towns of Redding and Wilton.

== Geography ==
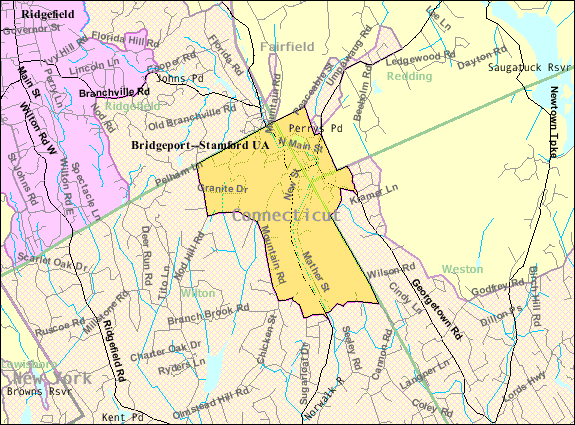
Map of the Georgetown CDP

According to the United States Census Bureau, the CDP has a total area of 2.85 square miles (7.4 km^{2}), of which 2.84 square miles (7.4 km^{2}) is land and 0.02 square miles (0.052 km^{2}), or 0.70%, is water. Of the total area of the CDP, 2.36 square miles (6.1 km^{2}) are in Wilton, 0.33 square miles (0.85 km^{2}) are in Redding, and 0.16 square miles (0.41 km^{2}) are in Weston.

== Demographics ==
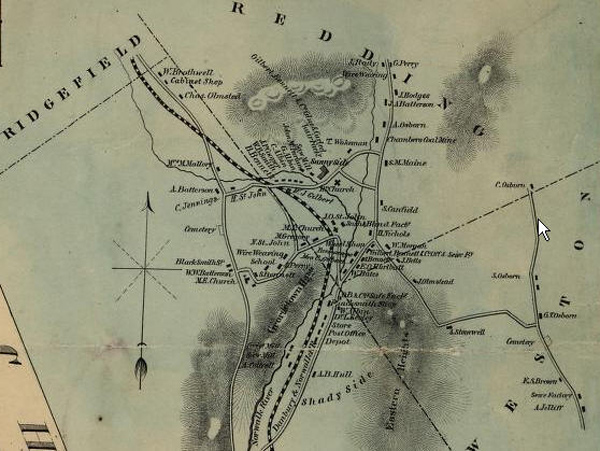
Georgetown on Clark's map of Fairfield County, published in 1856

=== 2020 census ===
As of the 2020 census, Georgetown had a population of 1,832. The median age was 41.5 years. 25.0% of residents were under the age of 18 and 14.1% of residents were 65 years of age or older. For every 100 females there were 94.1 males, and for every 100 females age 18 and over there were 93.5 males age 18 and over.

76.0% of residents lived in urban areas, while 24.0% lived in rural areas.

There were 663 households in Georgetown, of which 42.4% had children under the age of 18 living in them. Of all households, 59.7% were married-couple households, 15.7% were households with a male householder and no spouse or partner present, and 18.6% were households with a female householder and no spouse or partner present. About 20.7% of all households were made up of individuals and 9.2% had someone living alone who was 65 years of age or older.

There were 720 housing units, of which 7.9% were vacant. The homeowner vacancy rate was 3.7% and the rental vacancy rate was 1.6%.

Racial composition as of the 2020 census
Race	Number	Percent
White	1,456	79.5%
Black or African American	32	1.7%
American Indian and Alaska Native	1	0.1%
Asian	126	6.9%
Native Hawaiian and Other Pacific Islander	1	0.1%
Some other race	56	3.1%
Two or more races	160	8.7%
Hispanic or Latino (of any race)	171	9.3%

=== 2000 census ===
As of the census of 2000, there were 1,650 people, 572 households, and 455 families residing in the CDP. The population density was 581.8 inhabitants per square mile (224.6/km^{2}). There were 597 housing units at an average density of 210.5 per square mile (81.3/km^{2}). The racial makeup of the CDP was 90.62% White, 1.33% African American, 0.24% Native American, 3.39% Asian, 0.48% from other races, and 0.55% from two or more races. Hispanic or Latino of any race were 3.39% of the population.

There were 572 households, out of which 44.9% had children under the age of 18 living with them, 71.0% were married couples living together, 4.7% had a female householder with no husband present, and 20.3% were non-families. 16.3% of all households were made up of individuals, and 5.9% had someone living alone who was 65 years of age or older. The average household size was 2.87 and the average family size was 3.27.

In the CDP, the population was spread out, with 30.4% under the age of 18, 3.3% from 18 to 24, 29.9% from 25 to 44, 27.7% from 45 to 64, and 8.7% who were 65 years of age or older. The median age was 38 years. For every 100 females, there were 100.0 males. For every 100 females age 18 and over, there were 99.1 males.

The median income for a household in the CDP was $103,424, and the median income for a family was $110,081. Males had a median income of $81,538 versus $59,531 for females. The per capita income for the CDP was $55,029. About 2.0% of families and 4.7% of the population were below the poverty line, including 3.5% of those under age 18 and 4.6% of those age 65 or over.

== Movies filmed in Georgetown ==
- Reckless (1995)
- Other People's Money (1991)
- Rachel, Rachel (1968)

== Pictures ==
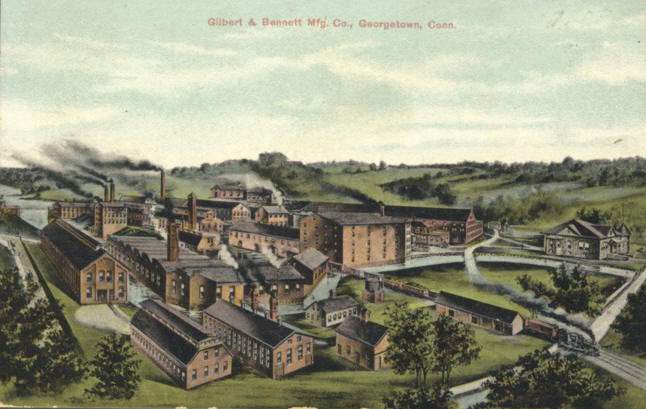
Gilbert & Bennett factory, 1909

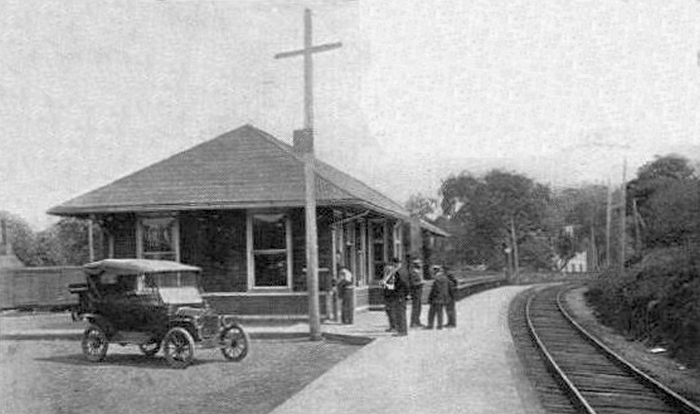
Georgetown train station, sometime before 1919

== See also ==
- Branchville (Ridgefield), a section of the town of Ridgefield sometimes considered part of Georgetown.
