= Equestrian statue of Israel Putnam =

Created 1969 by Anna Hyatt Huntington

General Israel Putnam
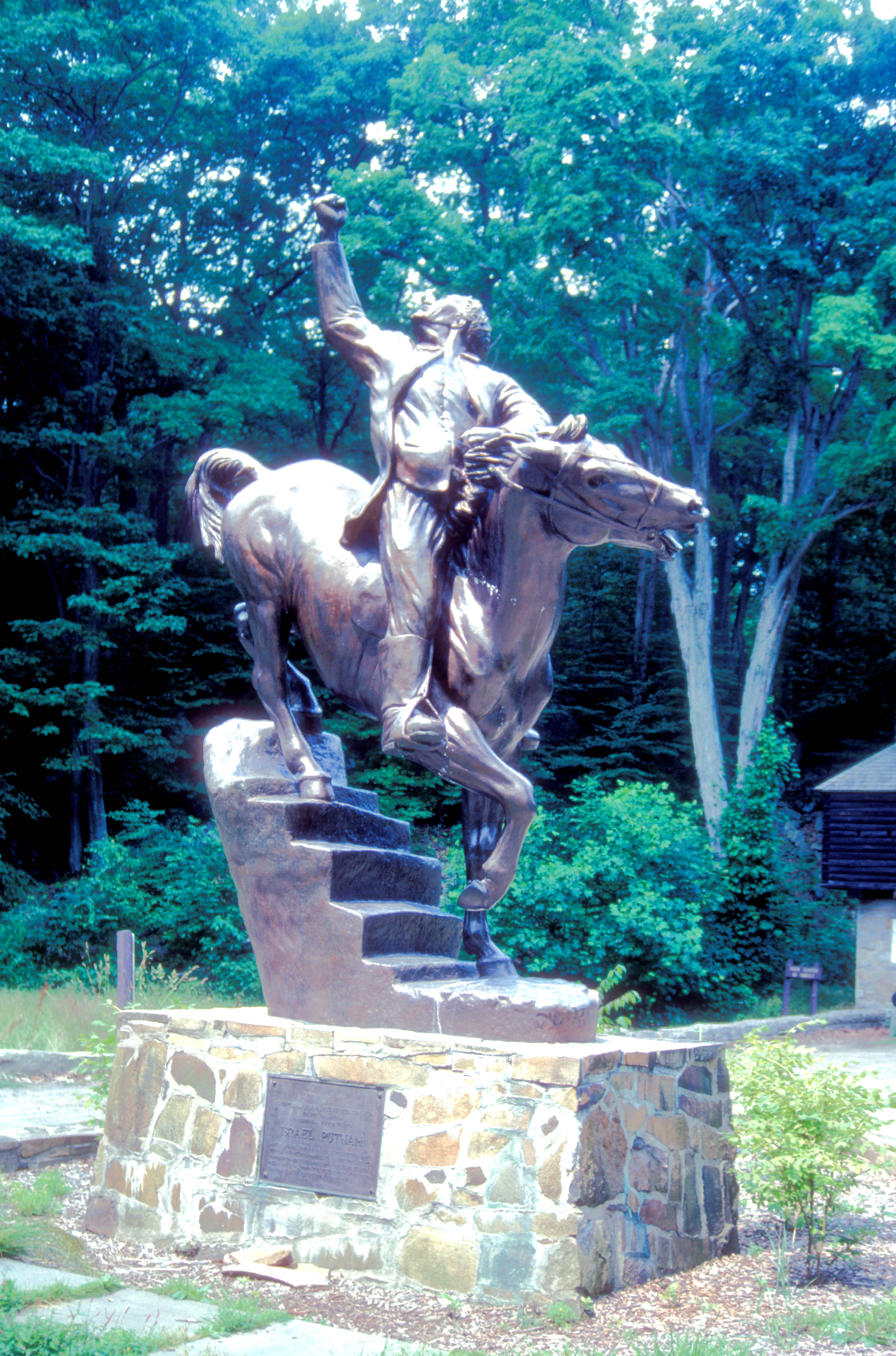
- The statue in 1970
- Location: Putnam Memorial State Park, Redding, Connecticut, United States
- Coordinates: 41°20′18.4″N 73°22′52.7″W
- Designer: Anna Hyatt Huntington
- Type: Equestrian statue
- Material: Bronze; Fieldstone
- Length: 94 inches (2.4 m)
- Width: 60 inches (1.5 m)
- Height: 160 inches (4.1 m)
- Beginning date: 1966
- Completion date: 1967
- Dedicated date: September 21, 1969
- Dedicated to: Israel Putnam

General Israel Putnam, also known as Putnam's Escape at Horseneck, is an equestrian statue at the Putnam Memorial State Park in Redding, Connecticut, United States. The statue was designed by sculptor Anna Hyatt Huntington and dedicated in 1969 in honor of Connecticut native Israel Putnam, a military officer who served in the Continental Army during the American Revolutionary War.

== History ==
Israel Putnam was a military officer who served as a major general in the Continental Army during the American Revolutionary War. Putnam became a well-known historical figure for his actions during the war, which included leading troops at the Battle of Bunker Hill. In 1779, while in Greenwich, Connecticut, the 60-year-old Putnam was spotted by British troops, who proceeded to chase him on horseback. In one of his most well-known escapades, Putnam managed to escape capture by riding his horse down a notably steep hill that was considered unsafe for horse-riding.

More than a century later, this story inspired sculptor Anna Hyatt Huntington to create an equestrian statue memorializing the event. Huntington, who was born in 1876, was an American sculptor from the Boston area who was recognized by the Metropolitan Museum of Art as one of the preeminent female sculptors in the country and had studied the craft at the Art Students League of New York in the early 1900s. For some time, Huntington had lived in Redding, Connecticut, near the Putnam Memorial State Park, which had served as Putnam's winter encampment during the war. Huntington was especially renowned for her equestrian statues, with some of her more notable works including an equestrian statue of Joan of Arc in New York City and El Cid Campeador.

Working on the Putnam sculpture in 1966 at the age of 90, it would be the last of seven major equestrian statues she had created during her career, as well as one of the last works created before her death in 1973. Completed in 1967, (Note: This completion date is given by the Smithsonian Institution Research Information System and is also engraved on the base of the sculpture itself. However, other sources state that 1966 was the year she "executed" or "unveiled" the sculpture.) the sculpture was donated to the Putnam Memorial State Park in 1969. It was dedicated on September 21, 1969, near the entrance of the park, with Albert D. Putnam, a descendant of Israel, giving the main speech at the ceremony, during which he stated that his ancestor had "rode down the hill to everlasting fame and into the heart of Mrs. Huntington". Another speech was given by Donald C. Matthews, Director of the Connecticut State Park and Forest Commission, who said: "We are here to honor two great citizens, General Israel Putnam and Mrs. Huntington, the most remarkable woman I have ever known."

In 1994, the monument was surveyed as part of the Save Outdoor Sculpture! project.

== Design ==
The bronze sculpture measures 10 feet (3.0 m) tall and has side measurements of 94 inches (2.4 m) and 58 inches (1.5 m). It stands on a rectangular fieldstone pedestal that is 40 inches (1.0 m) tall with side measurements of 5 feet (1.5 m) and 94 inches (2.4 m). The sculpture depicts Putnam on horseback descending a flight of stairs, holding the reins in his left hand. His body is partially turned backwards and he is looking up and shaking his right fist in defiance. The horse's head is turned to the left and bears a terrified expression. The base of the sculpture bears some small inscriptions from the sculptor (ANNA H. HUNTINGTON / 1967 / STANERIGG), while a bronze plaque affixed to the pedestal bears the following inscription:

DONATED A.D. 1969 / SCULPTRESS ANNA HYATT HUNTINGTON / IN HER 93RD YEAR / ISRAEL PUTNAM / SENIOR MAJOR GENERAL IN THE CONTINENTAL ARMY / WHO AT GREENWICH, CONNECTICUT / IN FEBRUARY OF 1779 / MADE GOOD A DRAMATIC MOUNTED ESCAPE FROM PURSING BRITISH DRAGOONS DOWN THE PERILOUS 100 STONE STEPS / CARVED INTO THE PRECIPICE AT HORSE NECK

== See also ==
- List of equestrian statues in the United States

== Sources ==
- Cullen-DuPont, Kathryn (2000). "Huntington, Anne Vaughn Hyatt". Encyclopedia of Women's History in America (2nd ed.). New York City: Facts On File, Inc. p. 120. ISBN 978-1-4381-1033-2.
- Eden, Myrna G. (1987). Energy and Individuality in the Art of Anna Huntington, Sculptor and Amy Beach, Composer. The Scarecrow Press. ISBN 978-0-8108-1916-0.
- Hubbard, Robert Ernest (2017). Major General Israel Putnam: Hero of the American Revolution. McFarland & Company. ISBN 978-1-4766-2783-0.
- Kort, Carol; Sonneborn, Liz (2002). "Huntington, Anna Vaughn Hyatt". A to Z of American Women in the Visual Arts. Facts on File, Inc. pp. 104–105. ISBN 978-1-4381-0791-2.
- "Israel Putnam, (sculpture)". Smithsonian Institution Research Information System. Archived from the original on October 22, 2021.
- Tensa, Karen (March 2, 2020). "Anna Hyatt Huntington's sculptures hold their power around the world, but CT admirers don't travel far to behold them". Connecticut Post. Hearst Communications. Archived from the original on October 22, 2021.
