= Equestrian statue of Joan of Arc (New York City) =

Statue by Anna Hyatt Huntington in New York City

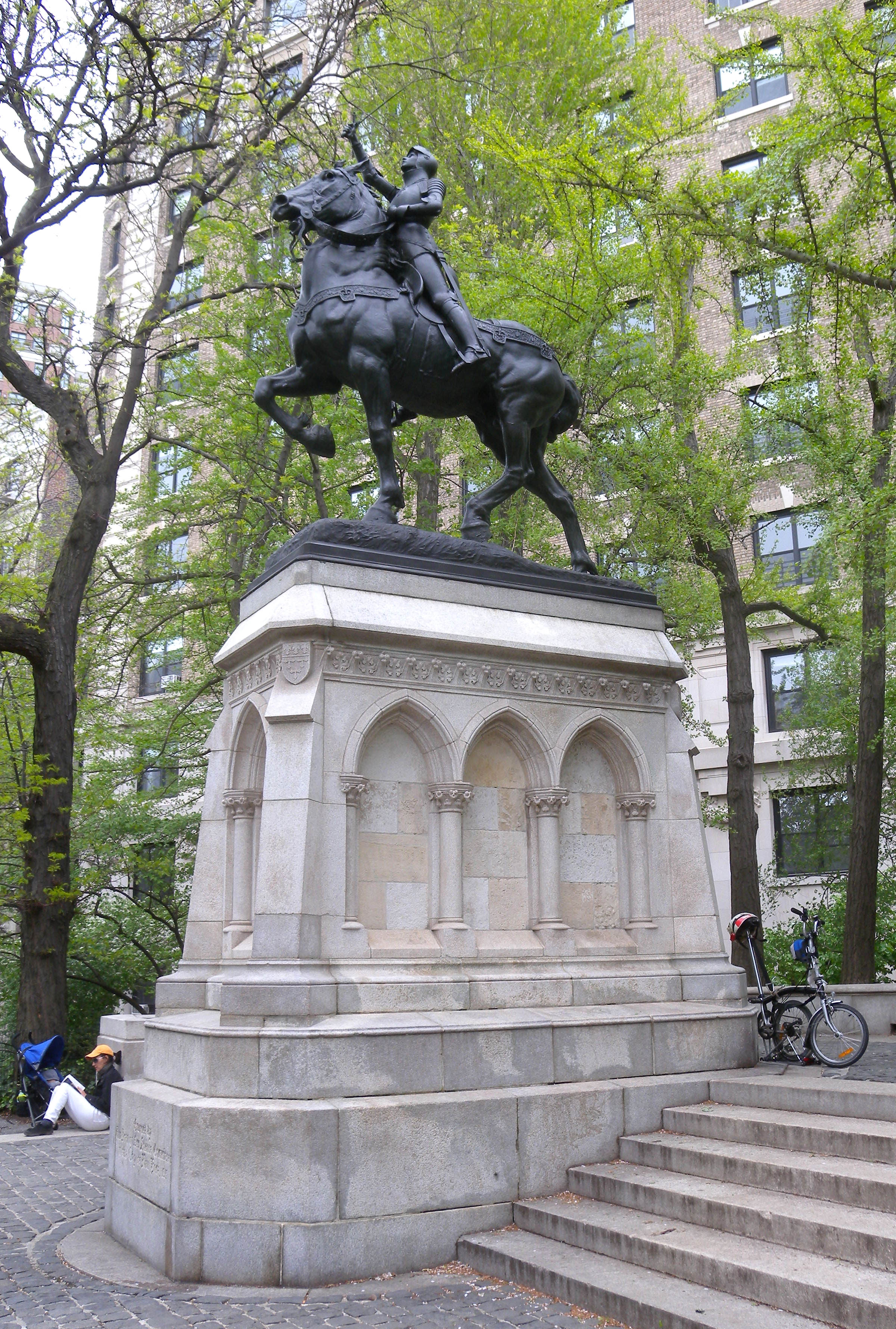
- The sculpture in April 2010

- Location in New York City, New York
- Artist: Anna Hyatt Huntington
- Type: Sculpture
- Medium: Sculpture: Bronze; Base: Granite
- Subject: Joan of Arc
- Location: New York City, United States; 40.794057°N 73.976490°W

Joan of Arc is a 1915 bronze equestrian statue on a granite base, sculpted by Anna Hyatt Huntington. The statue is located in Manhattan, New York City, on Riverside Drive and 93rd Street. It depicts the Roman Catholic saint and French folk heroine Joan of Arc.

== Description and history ==
Huntington's Joan of Arc stands at the intersection of Riverside Drive and 93rd Street in Manhattan. Copies were installed in San Francisco, Blois, Gloucester, Massachusetts, and Quebec City. Cast in bronze by the Gorham Manufacturing Company to one-and-a-half-times life size, its Mohegan granite base was designed by John Vredenburgh Van Pelt; it contains fragments of the Rouen cell Joan was imprisoned in before her execution, and from Reims Cathedral. Jean Jules Jusserand spoke at its dedication on December 6, 1915. The $35,000 ($1,113,900 in 2025) needed to erect the statue was donated by numismatist J. Sanford Saltus, namesake of the American Numismatic Society's Saltus Award. Huntington was catapulted into the international spotlight after the statue was unveiled with such dignitaries as Mina Edison.

In 1919 the New York Camera Club held a competition on who could take the best photo of the statue. The top four entrants had their pictures published in the November 16, 1919, New-York Tribune.

== Awards ==
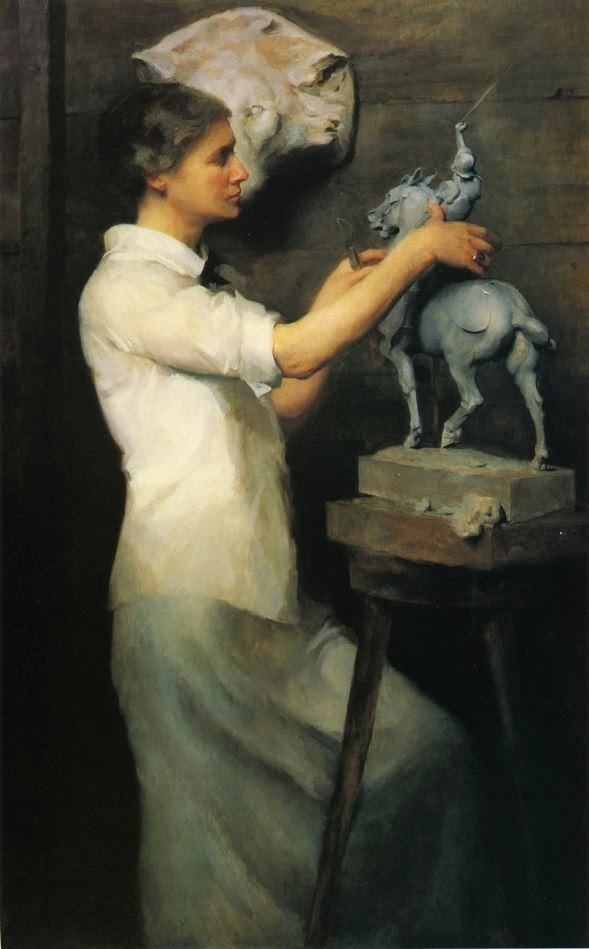
Portrait of Anna Vaughan Hyatt, 1915, painted by Marion Boyd Allen.

- The plaster model, which she made at the studio of Jules Dalou, earned her Honorable Mention at the 1910 Paris Salon.
- One of the works of art credited to the City Beautiful movement.
- Earned Anna Hyatt Huntington the Legion of Honor.

== See also ==
- 1915 in art
- Cultural depictions of Joan of Arc
- Equestrian statue of Joan of Arc (Portland, Oregon)

== Bibliography ==
- Bain, George Grantham (December 6, 1915). "Mrs. T.A. Edison, Mme. Jusserand, J.J. Jusserand". Bain News Service, publisher in Library of Congress.
- Grimm, Edward (2007). Riverside Park: The Splendid Sliver. Columbia University Press. ISBN 9780231512190. - Total pages: 128
- "J. Sanford Saltus Obituary". The Numismatist. 35 (8). American Numismatic Association. August 1922. ISSN 0029-6090. LCCN 46040248. OCLC 01713845.
- Salmon, Robin R. (2009). Sculpture of Brookgreen Gardens. Arcadia Publishing. ISBN 9780738566566. - Total pages: 128
- "New York Camera Club Competition". New-York Tribune. 1919. pp. 1–20. ISSN 1941-0646. OCLC 9405688.
