= McKamie Farmhouse =

- Town/City: Waxhaws
- State: North Carolina
- Country: United States
- Coordinates: 34°51′56″N 80°47′15″W

The McKamie Farmhouse was a farmhouse located in Waxhaws, North Carolina, and is one of two disputed birthplaces of Andrew Jackson, the other being in South Carolina. A historical marker was placed in 1910 by the North Carolina Daughters of the American Revolution.
