= Anna Hyatt Huntington =

American sculptor (1876–1973)

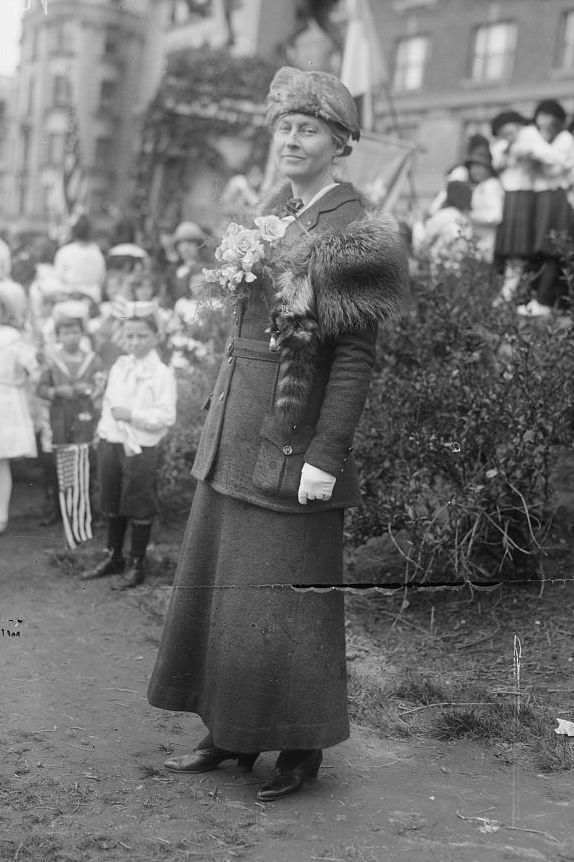
- Anna Hyatt Huntington in 1921
- Born: Anna Vaughn Hyatt; March 10, 1876; Cambridge, Massachusetts, US
- Died: October 4, 1973 (aged 97); Redding, Connecticut, US
- Education: Art Students League of New York
- Known for: Sculpture
- Awards: Chevalier de la Légion d'honneur

Anna Vaughn Huntington (née Hyatt; March 10, 1876 – October 4, 1973) was an American sculptor who was among New York City's most prominent sculptors in the early 20th century. At a time when very few women were successful artists, she had a thriving career. Hyatt Huntington exhibited often, traveled widely, received critical acclaim at home and abroad, and won multiple awards and commissions.

During the first two decades of the 20th century, Hyatt Huntington became famous for her animal sculptures, which combine vivid emotional depth with skillful realism. In 1915, she created the first public monument by a woman to be erected in New York City. Her Joan of Arc, located on Riverside Drive at 93rd Street, is the city's first monument dedicated to a historical woman.

== Biography ==
Anna Vaughn Hyatt was born in Cambridge, Massachusetts, on March 10, 1876. She was the daughter of the artist Audella Beebe and Alpheus Hyatt, a professor of paleontology and zoology at Harvard University and MIT. Her father encouraged her early interest in animals and animal anatomy. Anna Hyatt first studied with Henry Hudson Kitson in Boston, who threw her out after she identified equine anatomical deficiencies in his work (Rubenstein 1990).

Later, she studied with Hermon Atkins MacNeil and Gutzon Borglum at the Art Students League of New York. In addition to these formal studies, she spent many hours making extensive study of animals in various zoos (including the Bronx Zoo) and circuses.

Her work was entered in the sculpture event in the art competition at the 1928 Summer Olympics. In 1932, Huntington became one of the earliest woman artists to be elected to the American Academy of Arts and Letters. She was one of 250 sculptors who exhibited in the 3rd Sculpture International held in the summer of 1949 at the Philadelphia Museum of Art.

In 1927, Huntington contracted tuberculosis. She struggled with it for a decade but survived the illness.

Huntington married Archer Milton Huntington on March 10, 1923. They founded Brookgreen Gardens near Georgetown, South Carolina, incorporating Brookgreen Plantation, which was started in the late 18th century and was a major antebellum plantation. This property was listed on the National Register of Historic Places in 1978 and designated as a National Historic Landmark District in 1992.

Hyatt Huntington was a member of the National Academy of Design and the National Sculpture Society (NSS). She and her husband donated $100,000 to underwrite the NSS Exhibition of 1929. Because of her husband's enormous wealth and the shared interests of the couple, the Huntingtons founded fourteen museums and four wildlife preserves. They also donated the land for the Collis P. Huntington State Park to the State of Connecticut. It consists of approximately 800 acres (3.2 km^{2}) of land in Redding, Connecticut, the town where they lived.

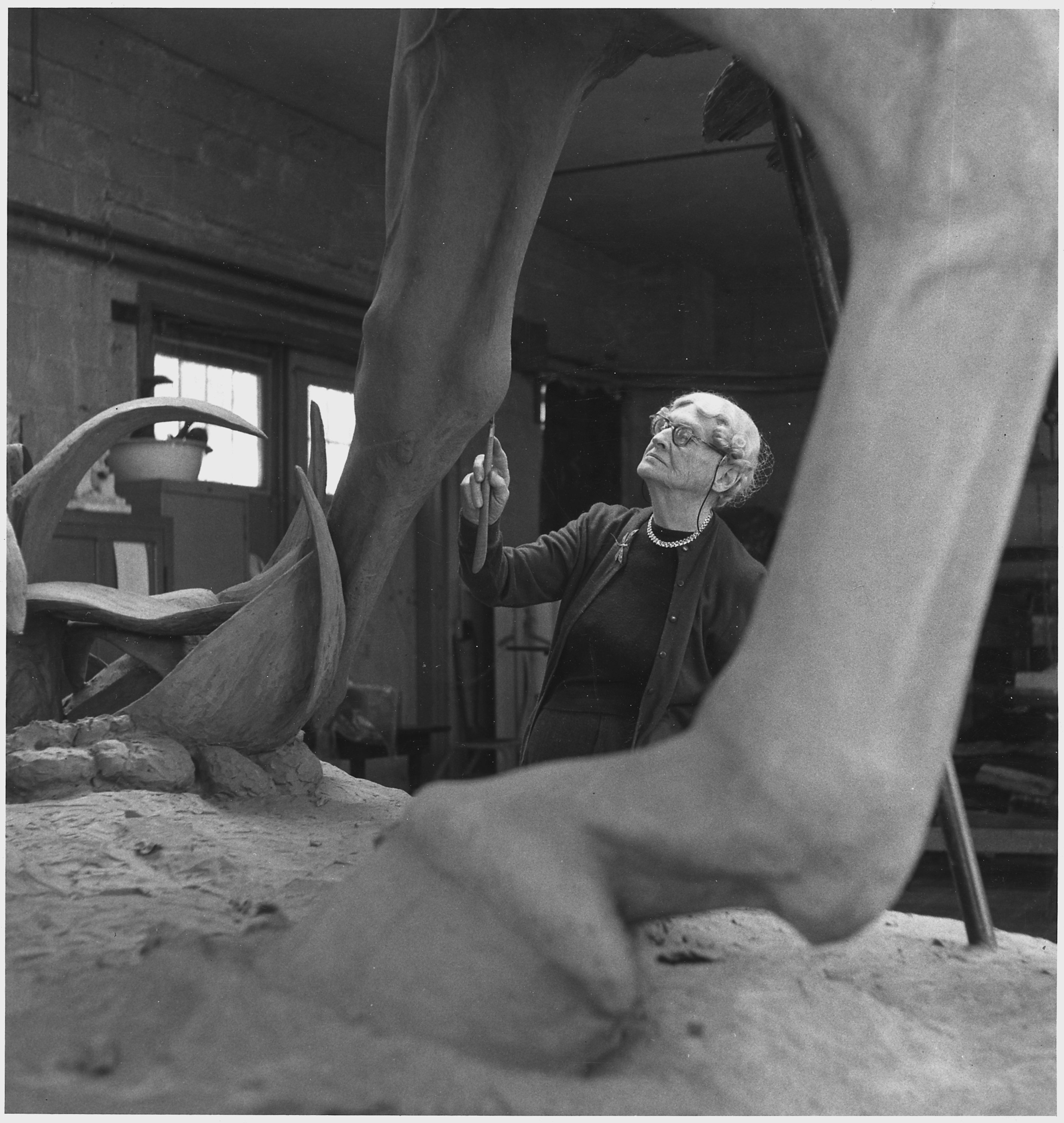
Anna Hyatt Huntington works on a statue of Jose Marti, a Cuban hero

Anna Vaughn Hyatt Huntington died October 4, 1973, in Redding, Connecticut. She is buried in Woodlawn Cemetery, The Bronx, New York City.

== Legacy ==
Anna Hyatt Huntington's papers are held at Syracuse University, and the Archives of American Art of the Smithsonian Institution.

The Metropolitan Museum of Art ranks Huntington as among the foremost woman sculptors in the United States to have undertaken large, publicly commissioned works, alongside Malvina Hoffman and Evelyn Beatrice Longman.

She was the maternal aunt of the art historian A. Hyatt Mayor.

== Public equestrian monuments ==
Anna Hyatt Huntington's animal sculptures, figures both life-sized and in smaller proportions, are held in museums and collections throughout the United States. Her work is displayed in many of New York's leading institutions and outdoor spaces, including Columbia University, Stevens Institute of Technology, the Metropolitan Museum of Art, the National Academy of Design, the New-York Historical Society, the Hispanic Society of America, the Cathedral of St. John the Divine, Central Park, Riverside Park and the Bronx Zoo. She spent two years collaborating with Abastenia St. Leger Eberle to produce Man and Bull, which was exhibited at the St. Louis Exposition in 1904.

The Hispanic Society of America was founded in 1904 by her husband, Archie Huntington, and headquartered at Audubon Terrace. Hyatt Huntington created the sculptures and fittings in Audubon Terrace's plaza and courtyard, including:

- bronze statue, El Cid (1927) There are also editions of this sculpture in: Seville and Valencia, Spain; Lincoln Park, San Francisco; Balboa Park, San Diego (El Cid Campeador); and Buenos Aires, Argentina
- four bronze Castilian warriors arranged around the El Cid statue,
- bronze flagpole bases,
- limestone bas-relief of Don Quixote, the hero of the novel by Cervantes; and
- limestone bas-relief of Boabdil, the last Moorish king of Spain.

She created two statues that are located at the entrance to Collis P. Huntington State Park in Redding and Bethel, Connecticut: Mother Bear and Cubs and Sculpture of Wolves. The park was donated to the state of Connecticut by the Huntingtons. Other equestrian statues by Huntington greet visitors to the entrance to Redding Elementary School, the John Read Middle School, and at the Mark Twain Library. The statue at the elementary school is called Fighting Stallions and the one at the middle school is called A Tribute to the Workhorse. The sculpture at the Mark Twain Library, also called The Torch Bearers, is identical in form to the one in Madrid, but is cast in bronze and appears to be smaller.

In her Horse Trainer (Balboa Park, San Diego) she enlivens the theme of the Roman marble Horse Tamers of the Quirinale, Rome, which had been taken up by Guillaume Coustou for the horses of Marly.

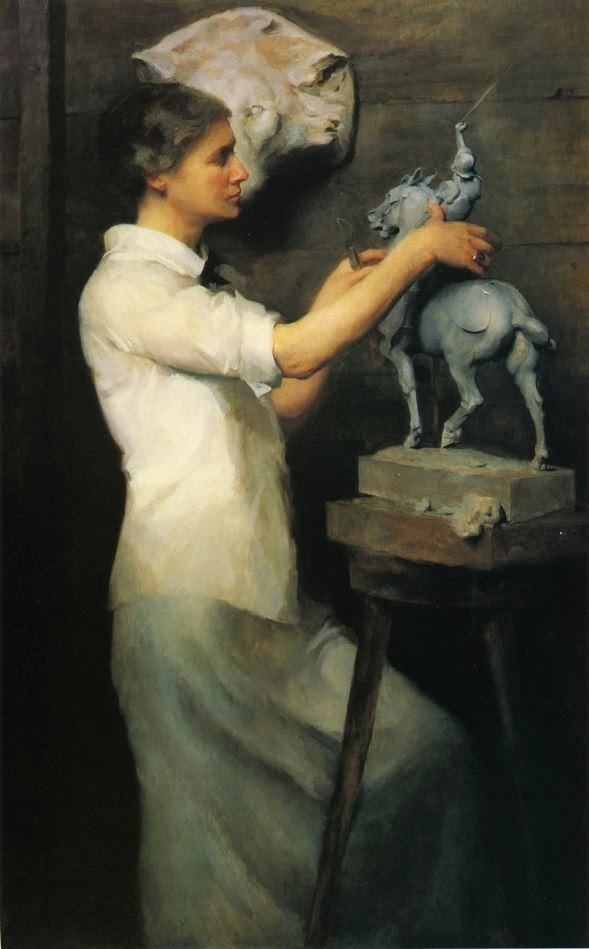
Portrait of Anna Vaughan Hyatt, 1915, by Marion Boyd Allen

Huntington's Joan of Arc stands at the intersection of Riverside Drive and Ninety-third Street in Manhattan. It commemorated the 500th anniversary of the birth of Joan of Arc and honored France, which was at war. Its unveiling catapulted Huntington into the international spotlight. Mina Edison, Thomas Edison's second wife, participated. Replicas of the statue are found:

- San Francisco, in front of the Legion of Honor (museum) in Lincoln Park.
- The Battlefields Park, Quebec City, Canada.
- Blois, France.
- Cast in 1921 and included as part of a memorial to locals who fought in World War I, located on Legion Square in Gloucester, Massachusetts, not far from Huntington's studio.

Andrew Jackson, A Boy of The Waxhaws, Andrew Jackson State Park, Lancaster, South Carolina, depicts a young Andy Jackson, sitting astride a farm horse. It is a bronze, larger-than-life statue. Usually her horses were noble, prancing, fierce beasts. She made Jackson's horse a gentler animal by fixing the energy and tension of the work on the figure of young Jackson. The sculpture was initiated by a letter from a sixth-grade class at Rice Elementary School in Lancaster, South Carolina, asking Mrs. Huntington if she would sculpt a statue of young Andrew Jackson for the state park. Mrs. Huntington submitted to do so, and replied, in part, "A picture came to mind as I read your letter and I have tried out the composition. I have Jackson as a young man of sixteen or seventeen seated bareback on a farm horse, one hand leaning on the horse's rump and looking over his native hills, to wonder what the future holds for him. He must have been a good looking and thoughtful boy, wondering what the future might hold, moments we all have from our teens to our nineties." The statue was completed at her Bethel, Connecticut studio, and was first worked in clay in half the scale of the final statue. Even then, it was necessary for the octogenarian sculptor to use a tall ladder to reach the top. South Carolina school children responded by donating their nickels and dimes to raise the necessary funds for a massive base to support the statue, which looks out over the large expanse of lawn at the park. County workmen placed the statue on its Lancaster County pink granite base in time for the ceremony marking Andrew Jackson's 200th birthday, in March 1967. This was Huntington's last major work, completed after her ninety-first birthday. The statue is located at Andrew Jackson State Park, about nine miles (14 km) north of Lancaster, South Carolina, just off US 521.

General Israel Putnam, Putnam Memorial Park, Redding, Connecticut, commemorates General Putnam's escape from the British in 1779, when he rode down a cliff at Horseneck Heights in Greenwich, Connecticut. The statue is located at the intersection of Routes 58 and 107 at the entrance to Putnam Park.

Los Portadores de la Antorcha ("The Torch Bearers"), cast aluminum, Ciudad Universitaria Dental School, Madrid, was given to the people of Spain to symbolize the passing of the torch of Western civilization from age to youth; it was unveiled 15 May 1955. At the time of its construction it was the largest statue in the world at 3,500 pounds (1,600 kg). Replicas of the statue are on the grounds of:

- The Discovery Museum, Park Avenue in Bridgeport, Connecticut, one mile (1.6 km) south of Merritt Parkway Exit 47 Lindale Park, Houston; cast bronze.
- The Mark Twain Library in Redding, Connecticut, cast bronze.
- The University of South Carolina's Wardlaw College at 33.99679°N 81.03052°W; cast bronze.
- Stevens Institute of Technology, Hoboken, New Jersey at 40°44′40.6″N 74°01′29.2″W; cast aluminum, April 1964.
- The Chrysler Museum of Art, Norfolk, Virginia at 36°51′21.8″N 76°17′37.0″W; cast aluminum, 1957.
- Valencia (Spain), close to the University of Valencia (donated in 1964).

Statue of Sybil Ludington to commemorate the 1777 ride of this 16-year-old who is said to have ridden forty miles at night to warn local militia of approaching British troops in response to the burning of Danbury, Connecticut. These accounts, originating from the Ludington family, are questioned by modern scholars. The statue is located on Rt. 52 next to Glenedia Lake in Carmel, New York (1961). Smaller versions of the statue exist on the grounds of the DAR Headquarters in Washington, DC; on the grounds of the public library, Danbury, Connecticut; and in the Elliot and Rosemary Offner museum at Brookgreen Gardens, Murrells Inlet, South Carolina.

Huntington produced four copies of a peaceful bronze statue of Abraham Lincoln reading a book, while sitting on a grazing horse, entitled “Young Abe Lincoln on Horseback”. Two of the copies were scale model casts made for public display, with first one shown outside the Illinois State pavilion at the 1964 New York World's Fair. Other small statue is located in front of the Bethel Public Library, Rt. 302 in Bethel, Connecticut. The statue, bears the signature, Anna Huntington, with the date of 1961. The oversize statue of the same subject at the State University of New York College of Environmental Science and Forestry, in Syracuse, New York, pictured elsewhere in this article. The statue is also called "On the Circuit. This Lincoln statue stood on the grounds of Huntington's Stannerigg estate outside Bethel until her death in 1973 and was bequeathed, along with several other pieces, to Syracuse University. Another large statue of Abraham Lincoln on horseback is found near the entrance of Lincoln's New Salem State Historic Site, Route 97, Petersburg, Illinois.

In 1964, the sculptor, Anna Hyatt Huntington, gave this bronze statue to the state of Illinois. Depicting a young Lincoln absorbed in studying, it shows a typical scene of Lincoln's life when he lived in this pioneer village between 1831 and 1837.Lincoln's New Salem. Conquering the Wild overlooks the Lions Bridge and The Mariners' Lake at Mariners' Museum and Park in Newport News, Virginia.

== Gallery ==
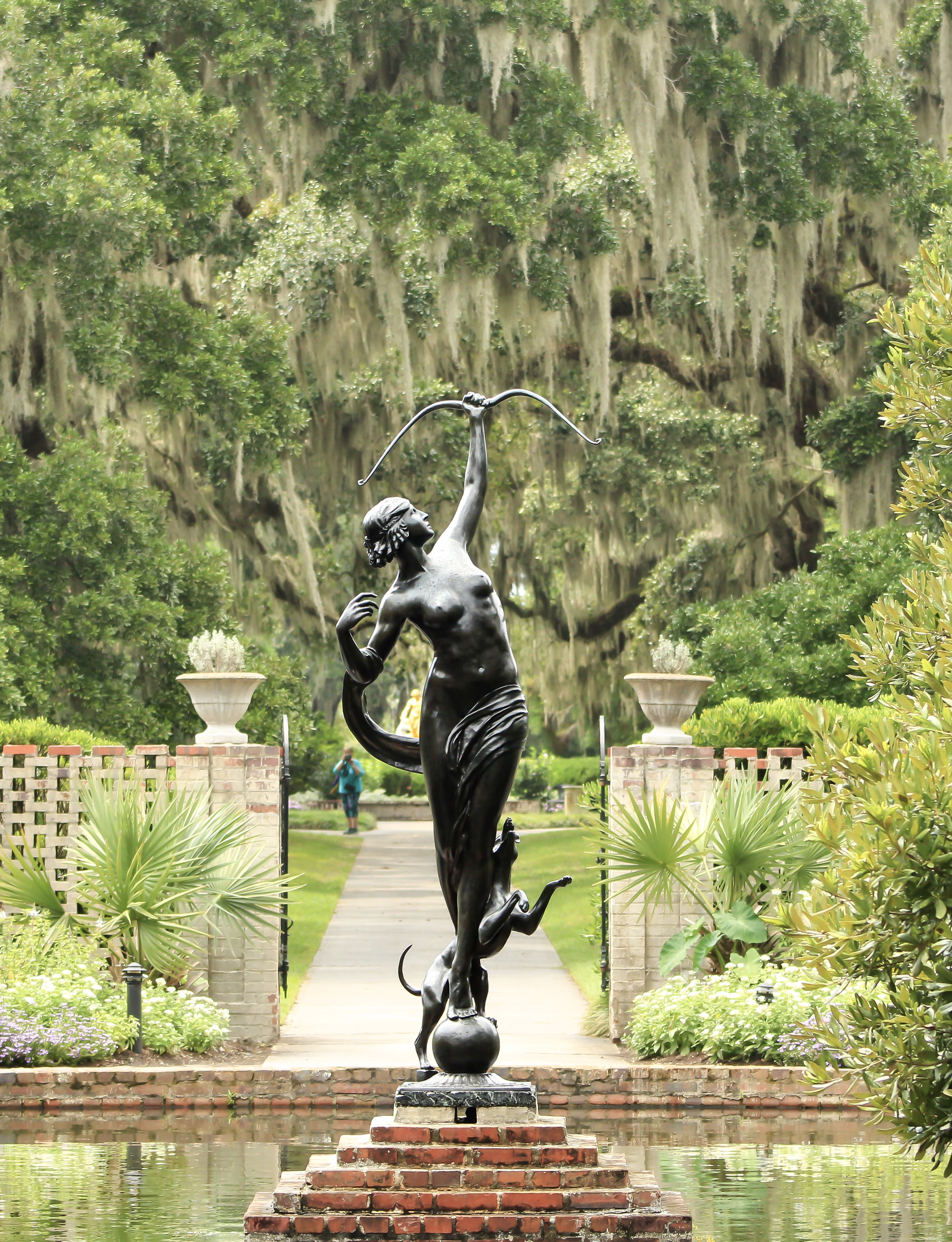
Diana of the Chase, Brookgreen Gardens, Murrells Inlet, South Carolina

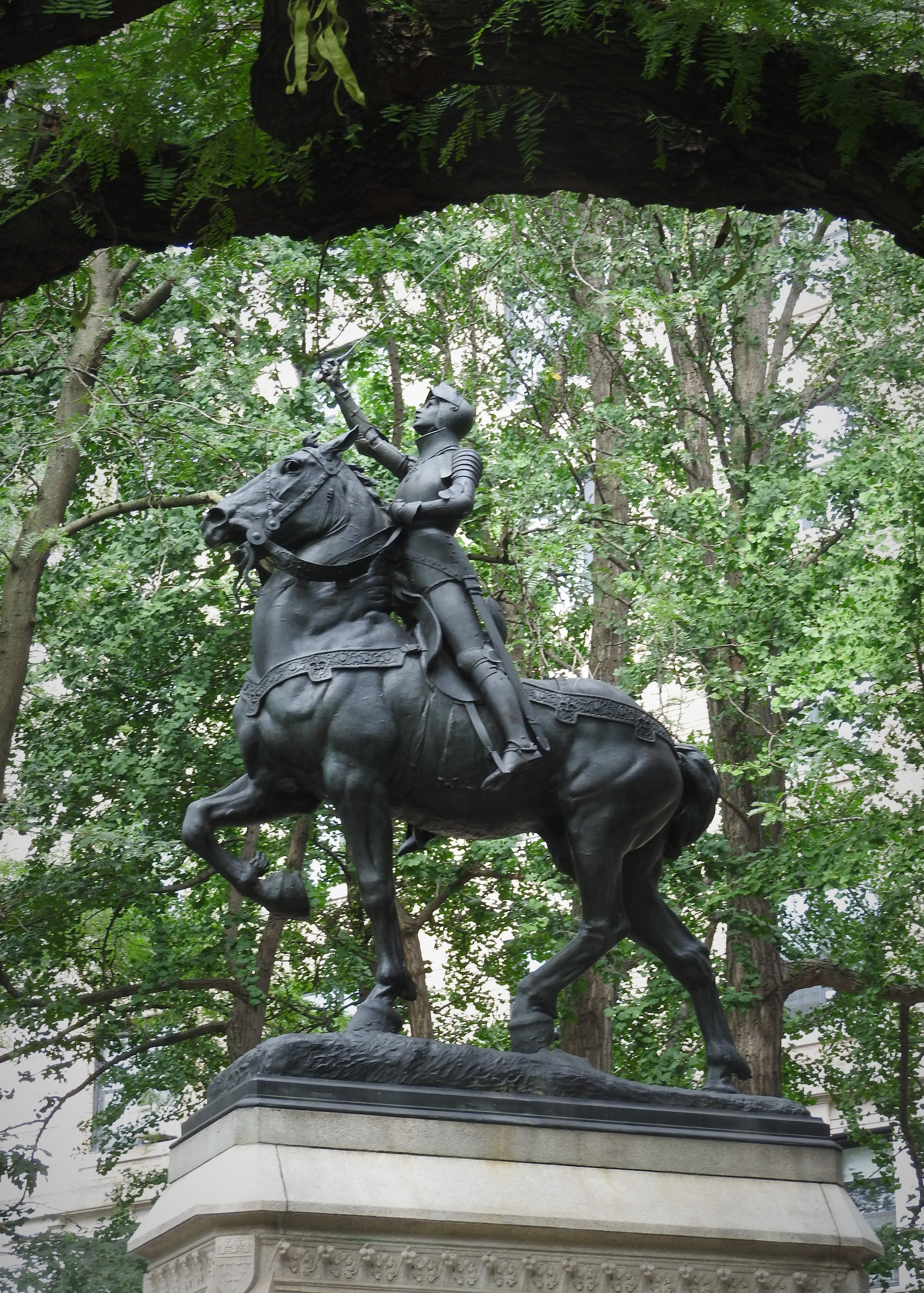
Joan of Arc, West Ninety-third Street, Manhattan

The Holy Family Resting - The Flight Into Egypt, Basilica of the National Shrine of the Immaculate Conception, Washington, D.C.

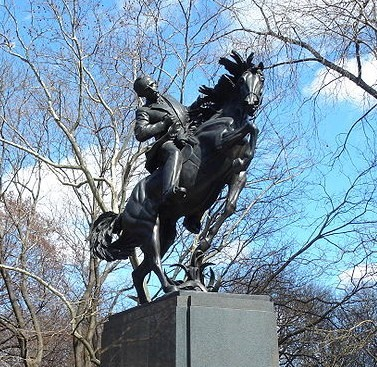
José Martí, Central Park, New York City

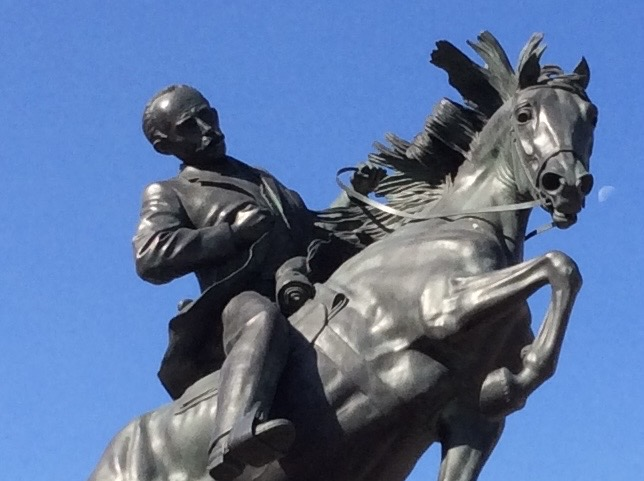
José Martí, detail. Plaza 13 de Marzo in Habana, Cuba. A copy of the statue is in Central Park, New York.

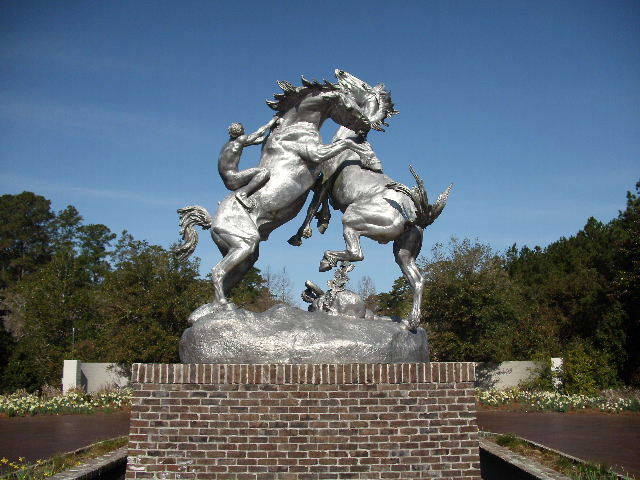
Fighting Stallions, 1950, aluminum, entrance to Brookgreen Gardens, Murrells Inlet, South Carolina

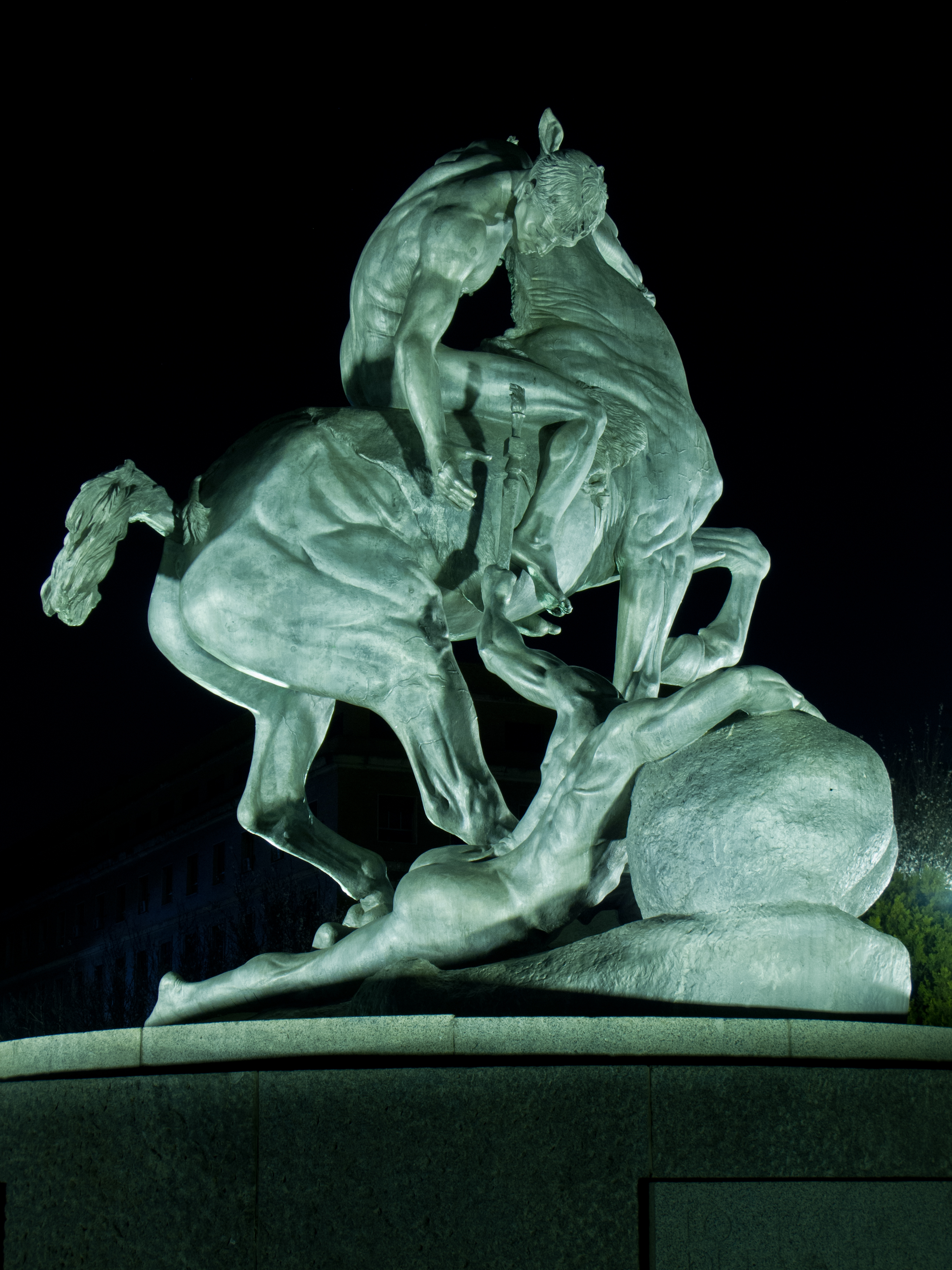
Los Portadores de la Antorcha ("The Torch-bearers"), cast aluminum, Ciudad Universitaria, Madrid

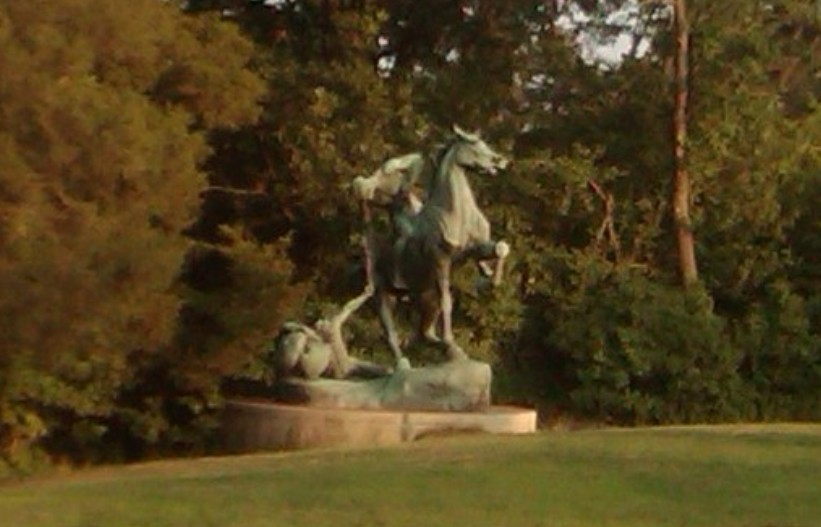
Los Portadores de la Antorcha ("The Torch-bearers"), cast bronze, Discovery Museum and Planetarium, Bridgeport, Connecticut

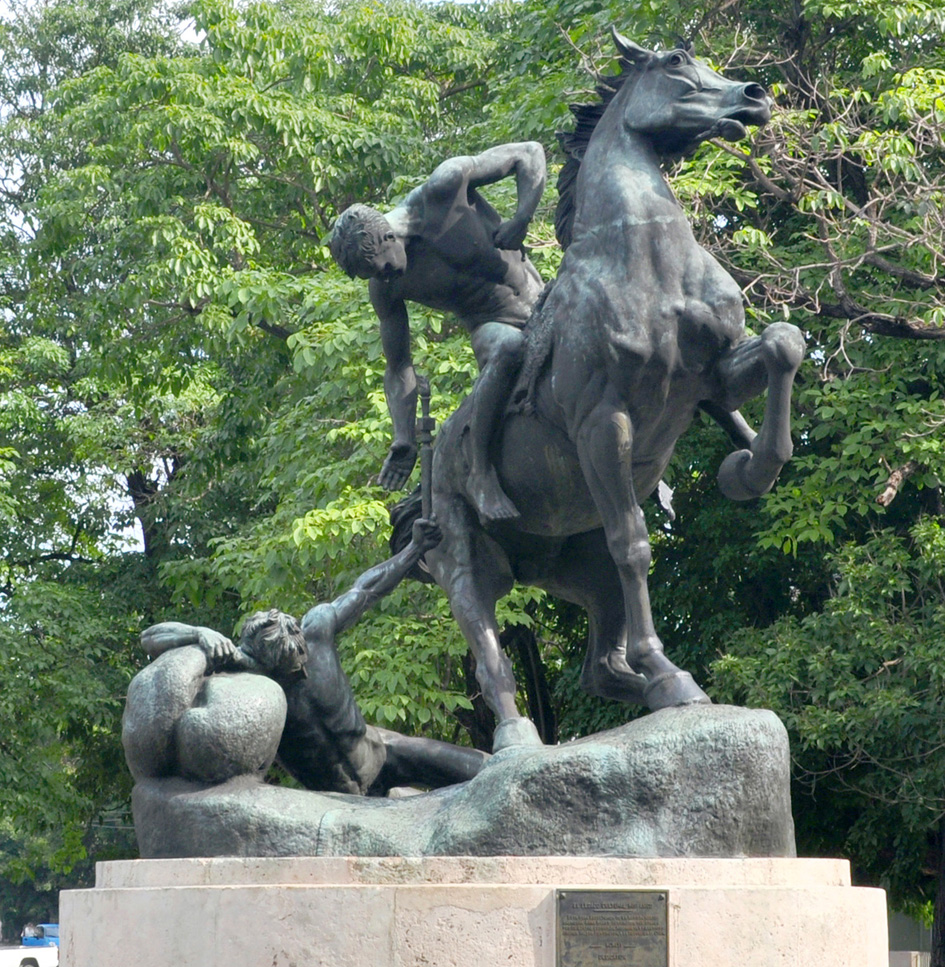
Los Portadores de la Antorcha ("The Torch-bearers"), cast bronze, Habana, Cuba

Mother Bear and Cubs, at Earthplace, Westport, Connecticut

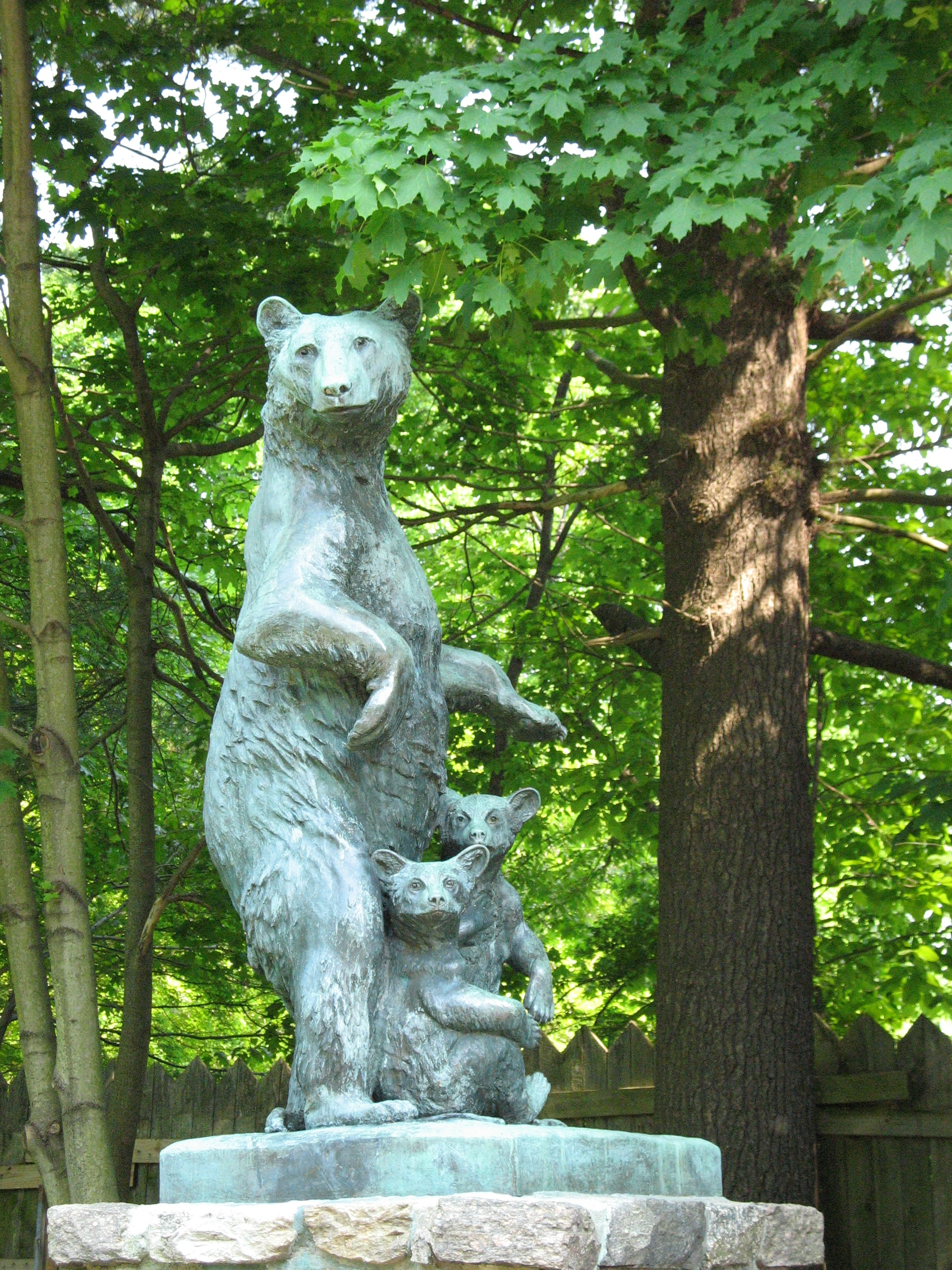
Mother Bear and Cubs, Huntington State Park, Redding, Connecticut

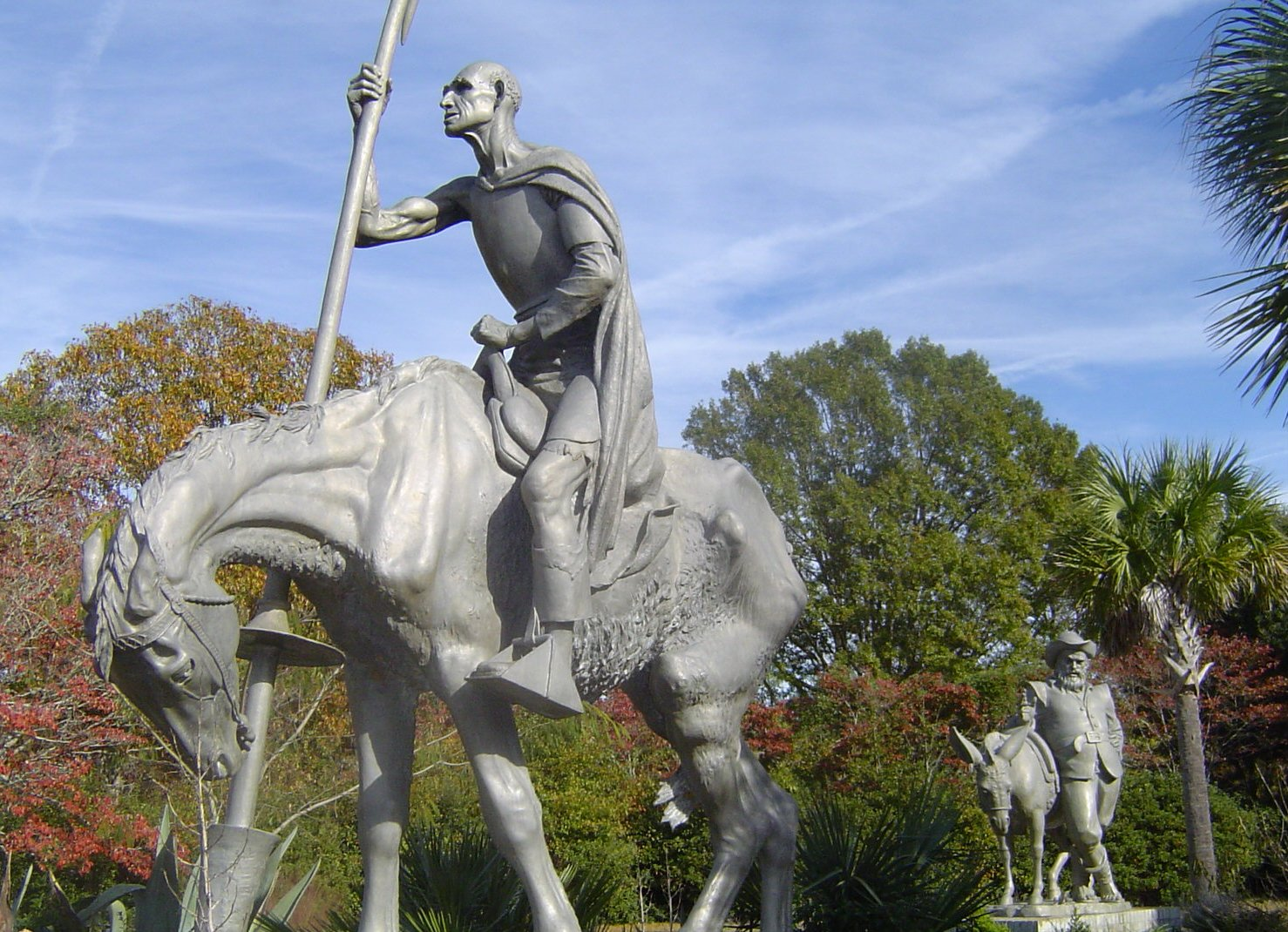
Don Quixote, aluminum 1947, Brookgreen Gardens, Murrells Inlet, South Carolina

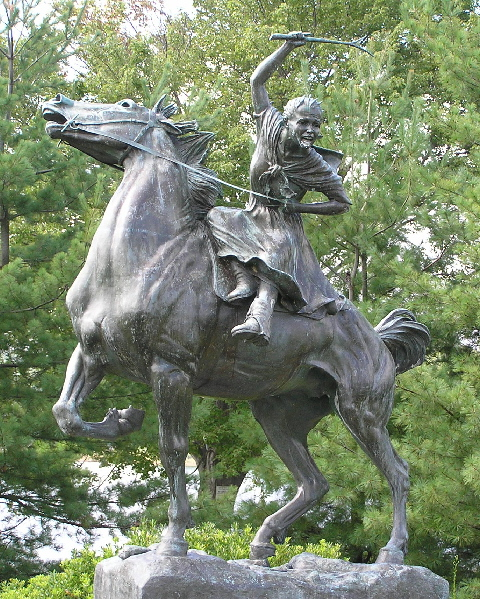
Sybil Ludington, 1961, Carmel, New York

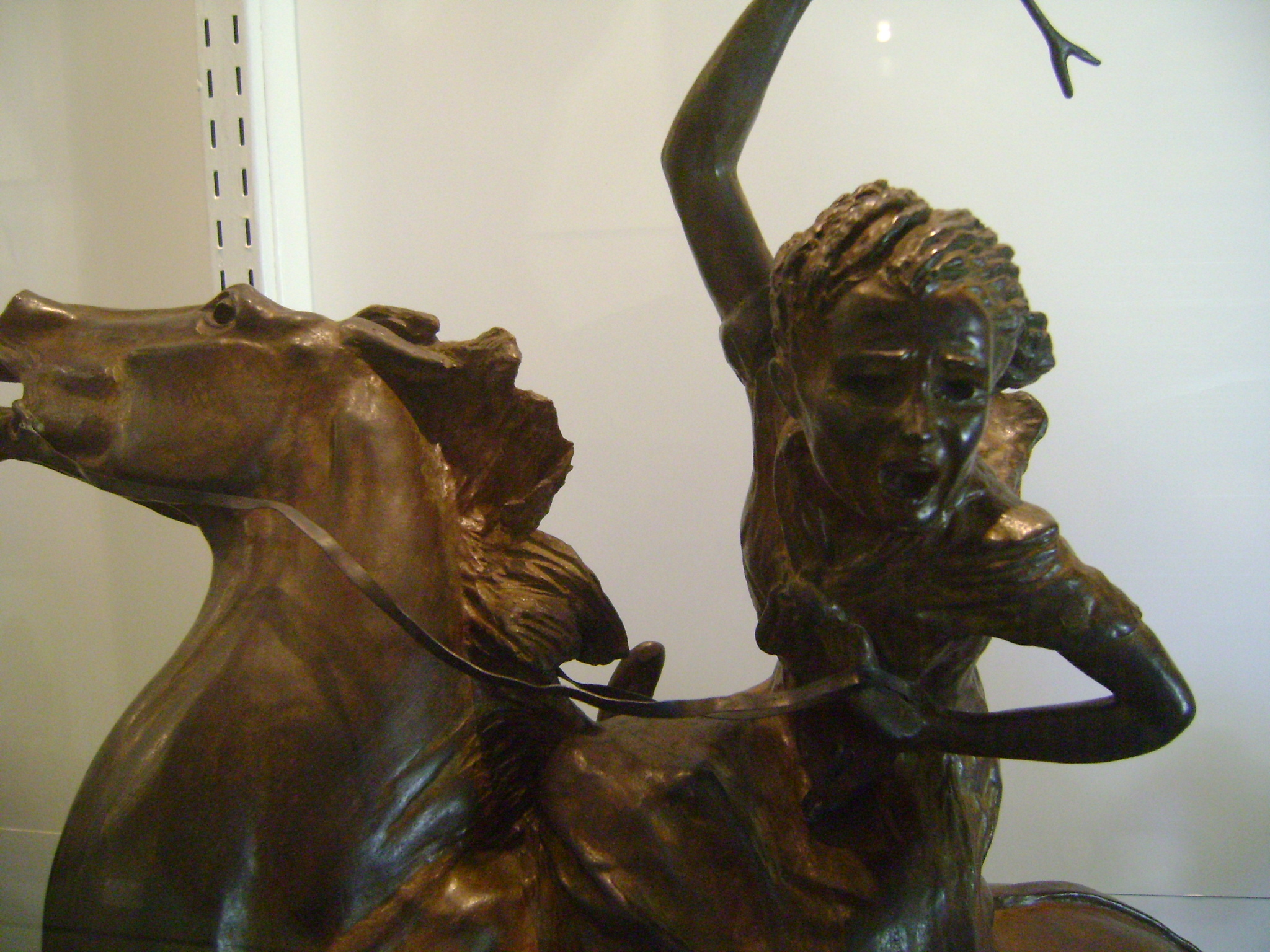
Smaller Sybil Ludington statue close-up, Offner museum, Brookgreen Gardens

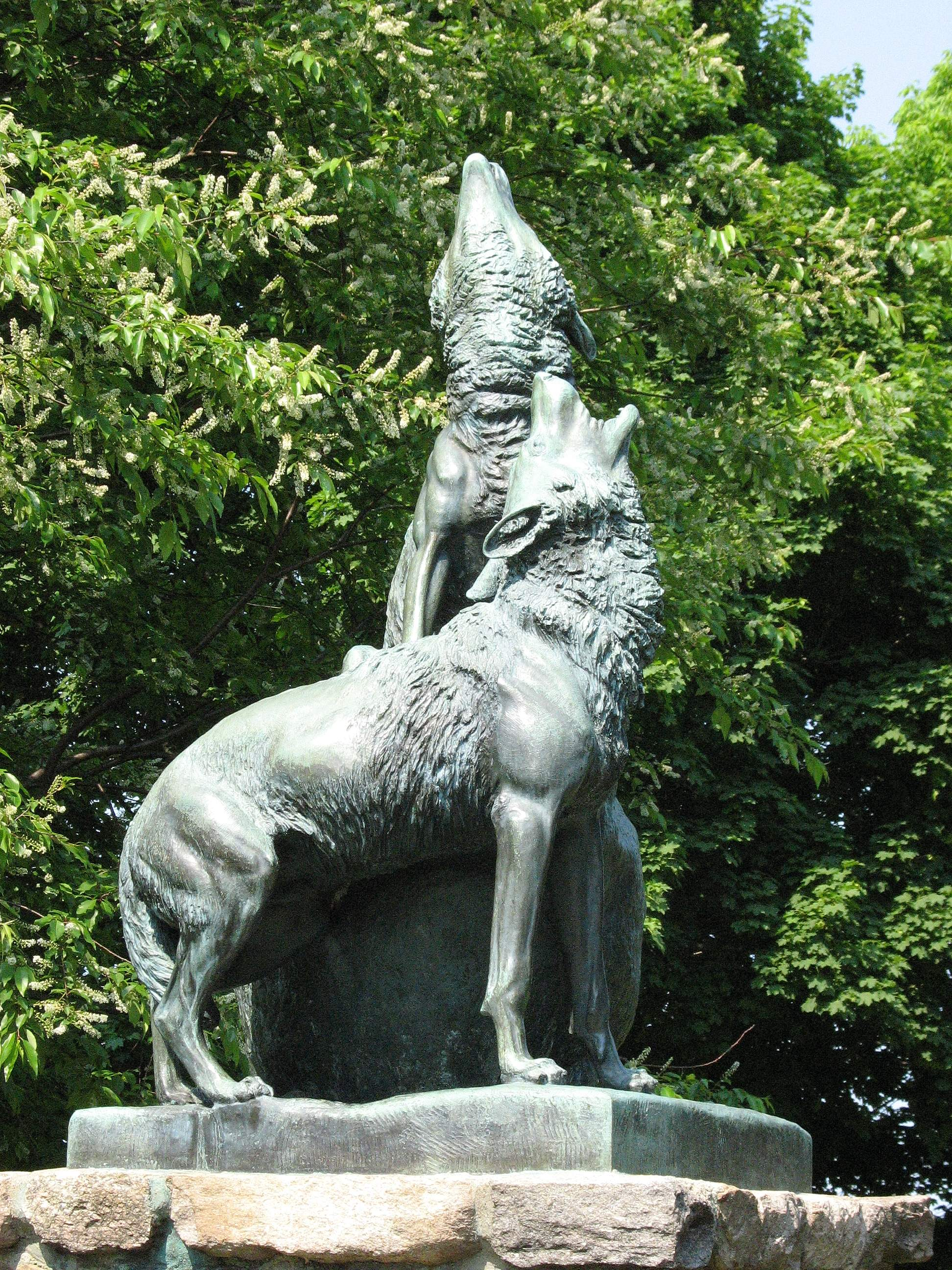
Sculpture of Wolves, Huntington State Park, Redding, Connecticut

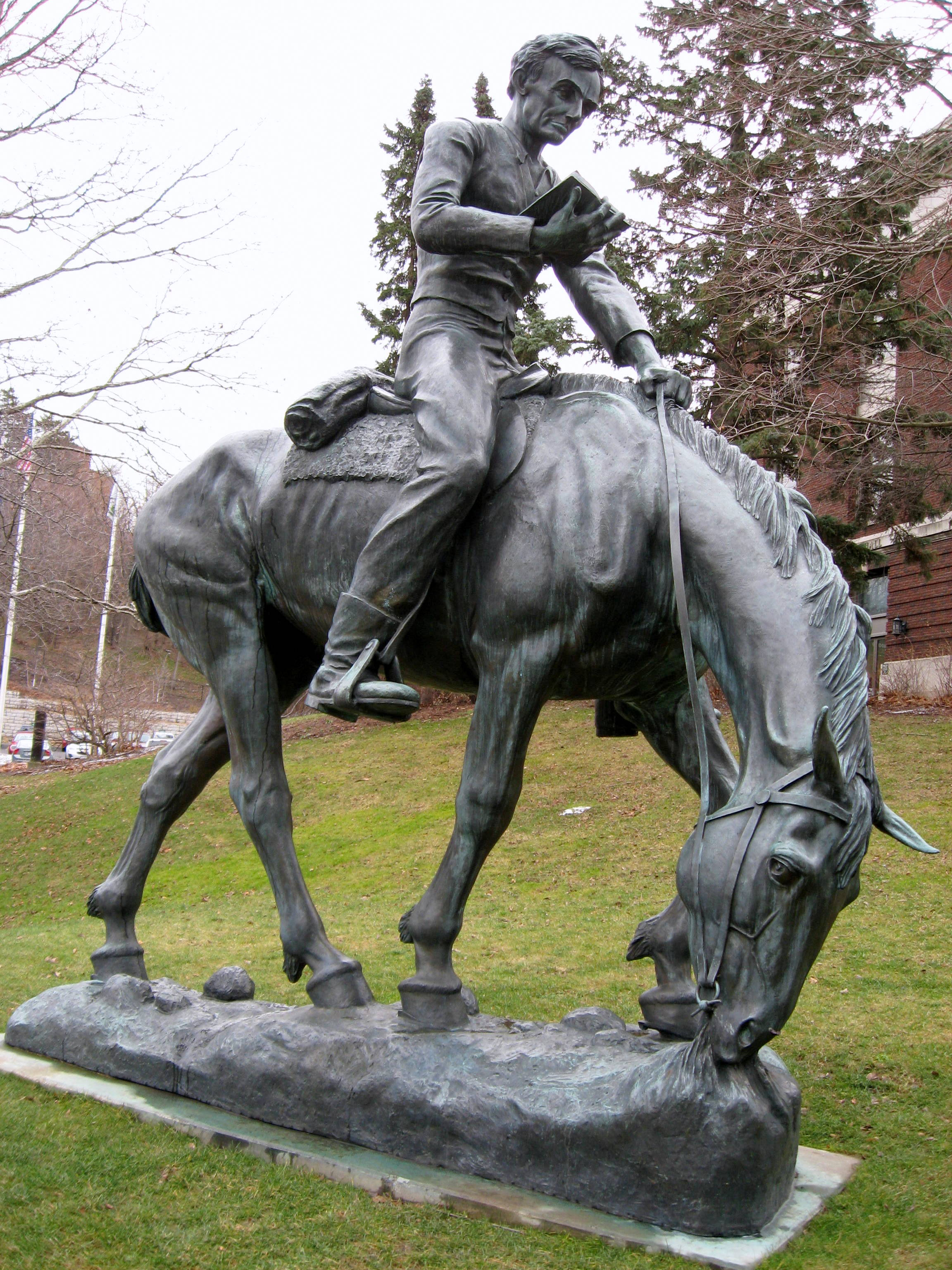
Young Abe Lincoln on Horseback, bronze 1966, on the campus of the State University of New York College of Environmental Science and Forestry, Syracuse, New York

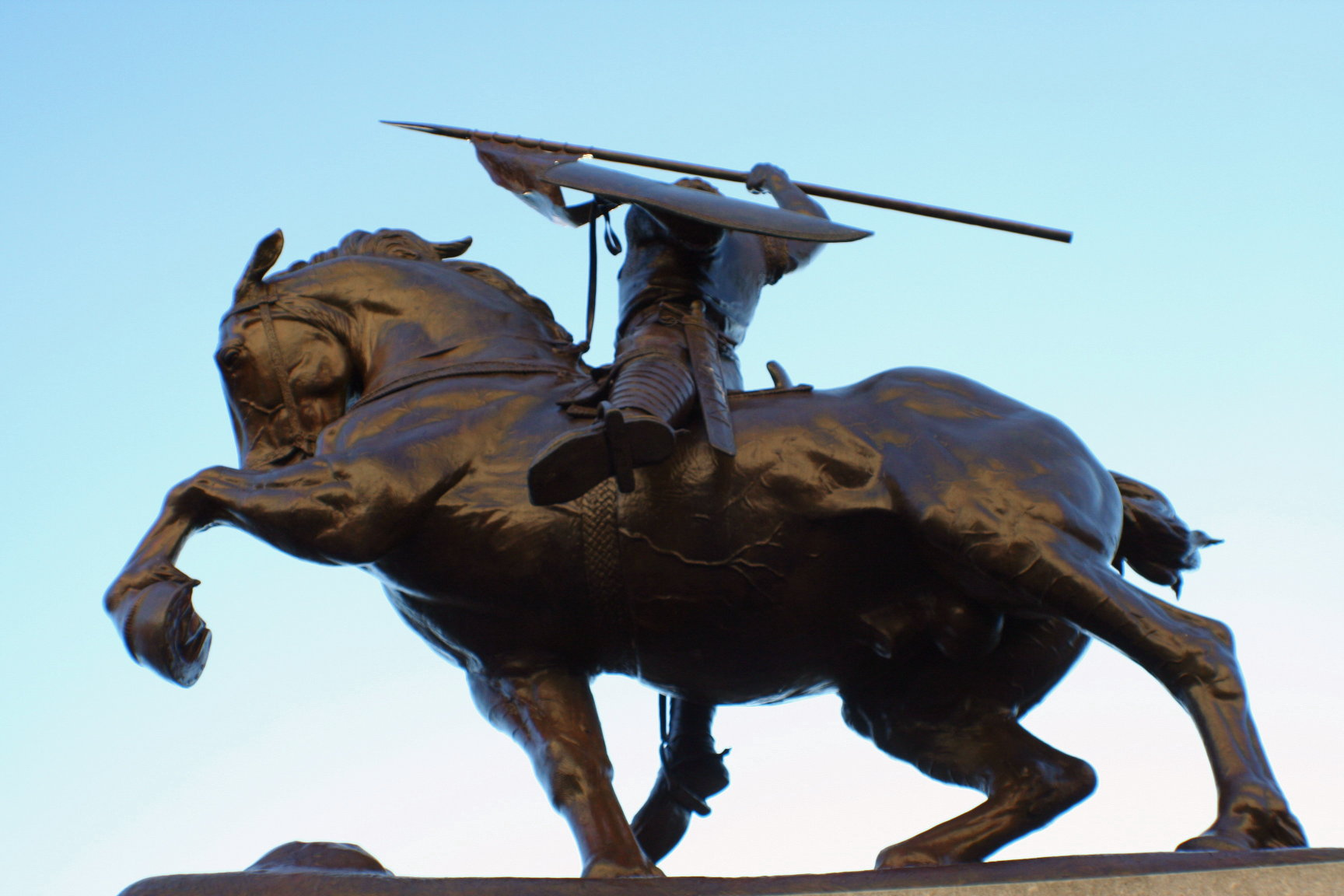
El Cid Campeador, bronze 1923, the central sculpture at the entrance to the Hispanic Society of America, New York City

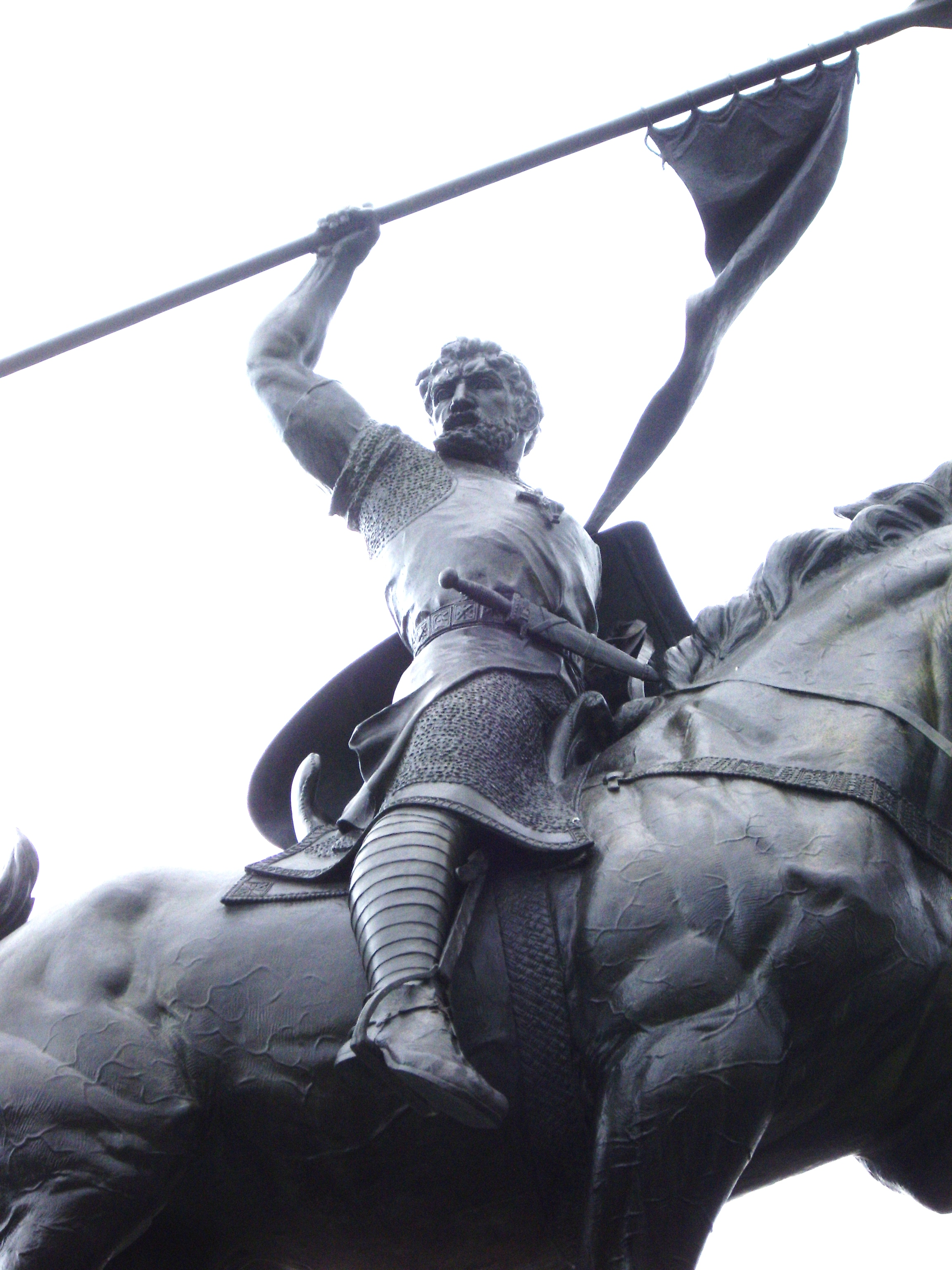
Cid Campeador, a monument to El Cid in Seville

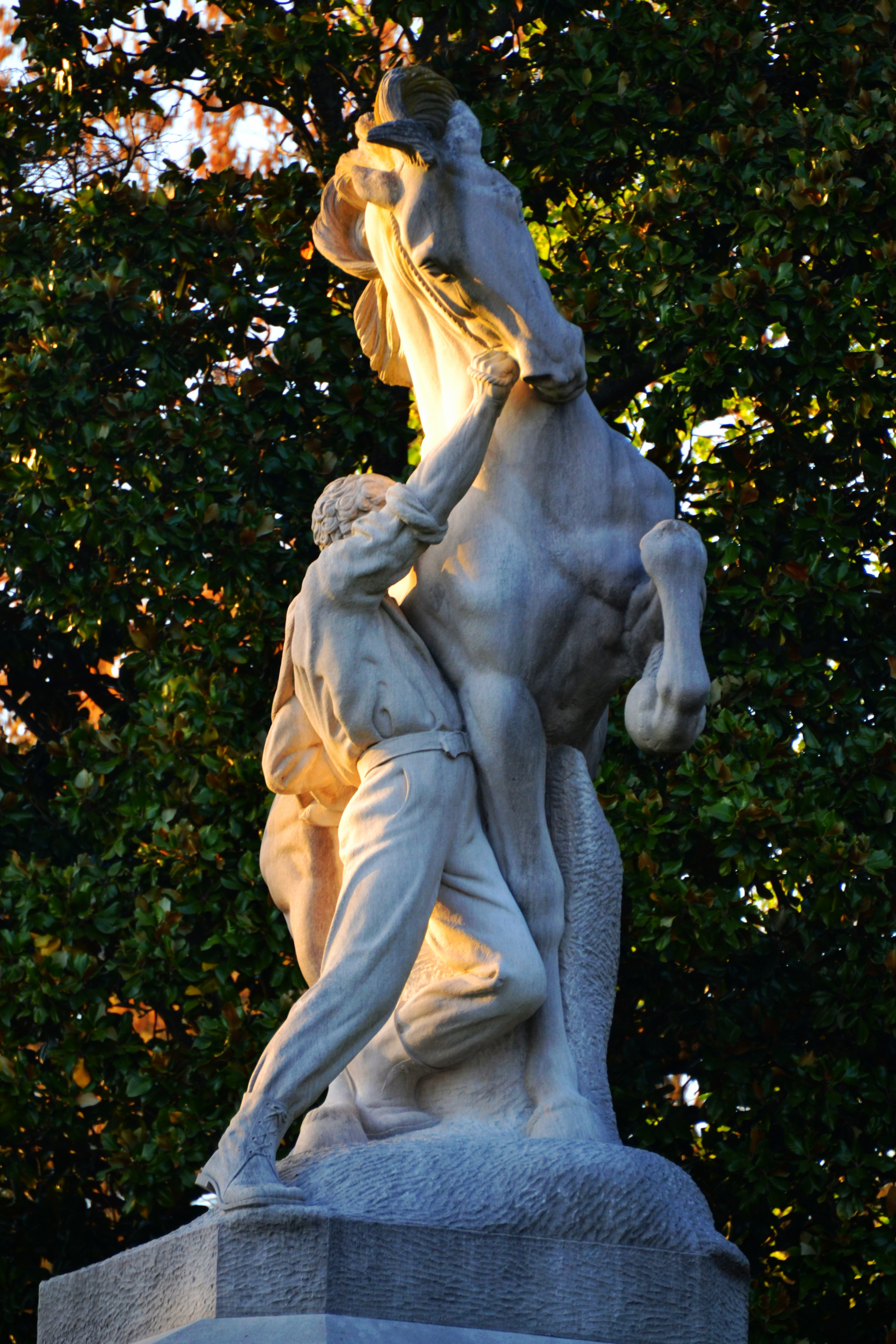
Youth Conquering the Wild at The Mariners Museum in Newport News, Virginia

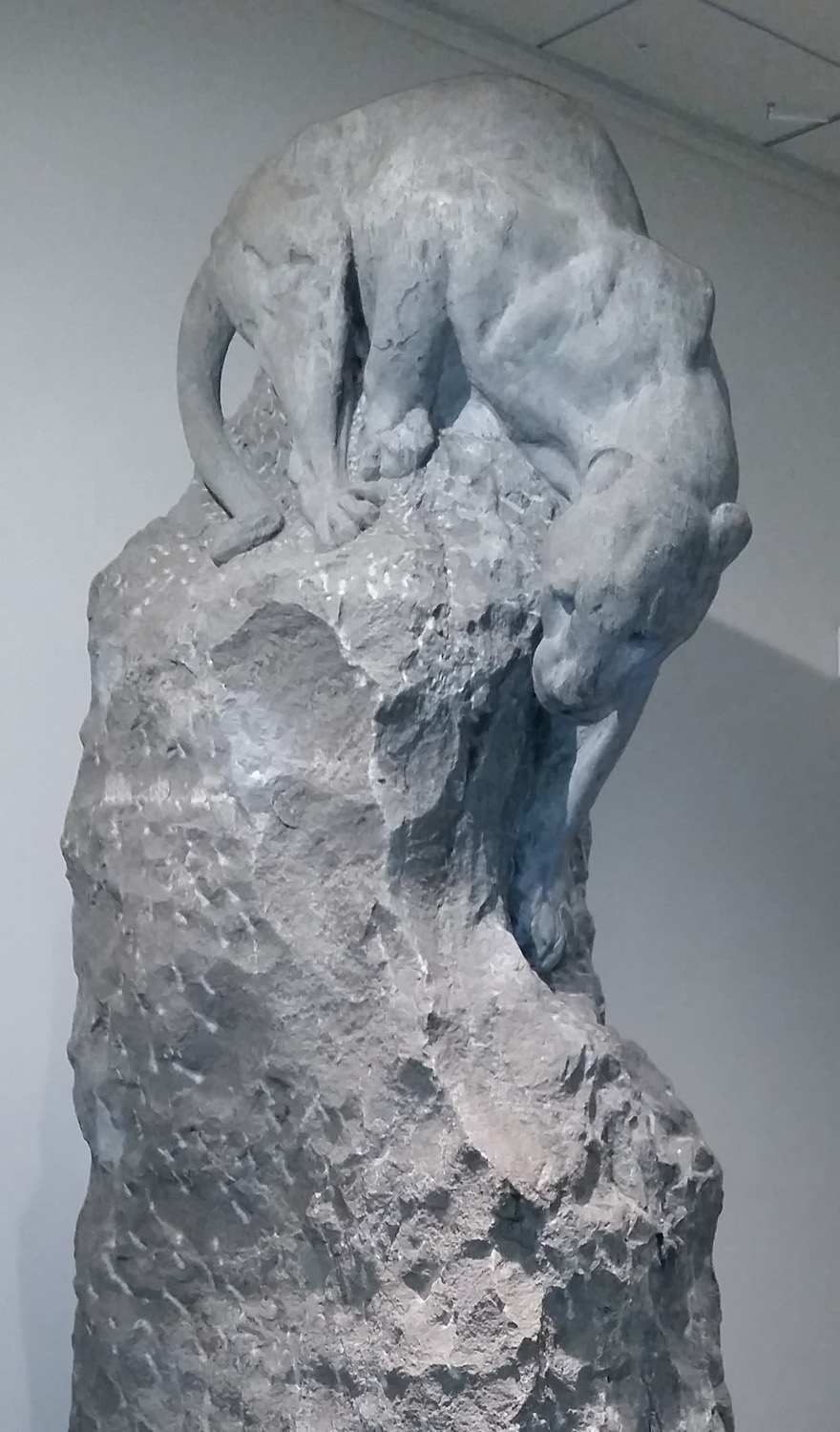
One of the Reaching Jaguar sculptures at The Mariners Museum in Newport News, Virginia

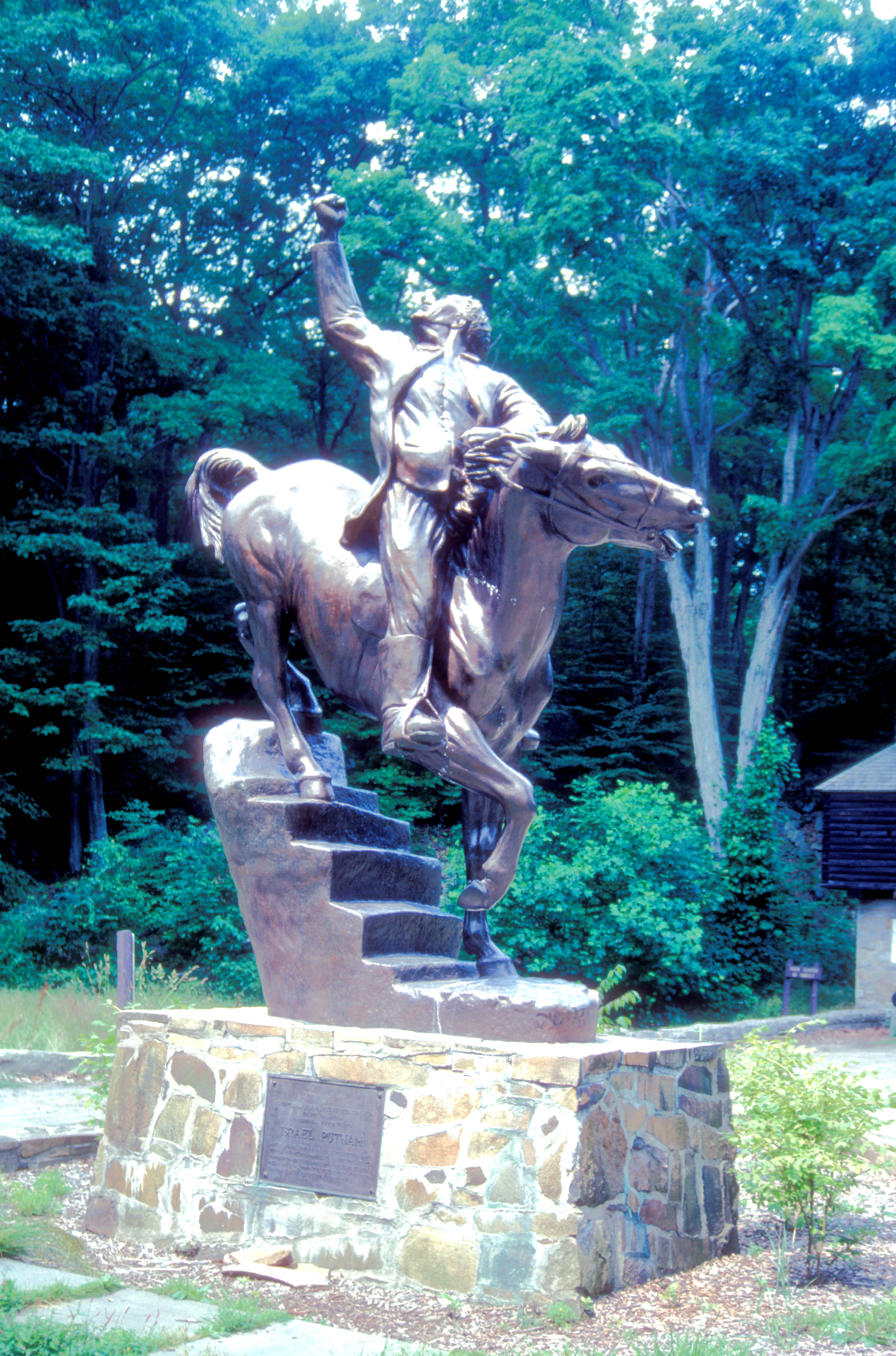
Equestrian statue of Israel Putnam at the entrance to Putnam Memorial State Park

== See also ==
- Atalaya and Brookgreen Gardens, a National Historic Landmark site in South Carolina
- Berkshire Museum, Massachusetts
