= Equestrian statue of José Martí (Central Park) =

Equestrian statue in Central Park, Manhattan, New York, U.S.

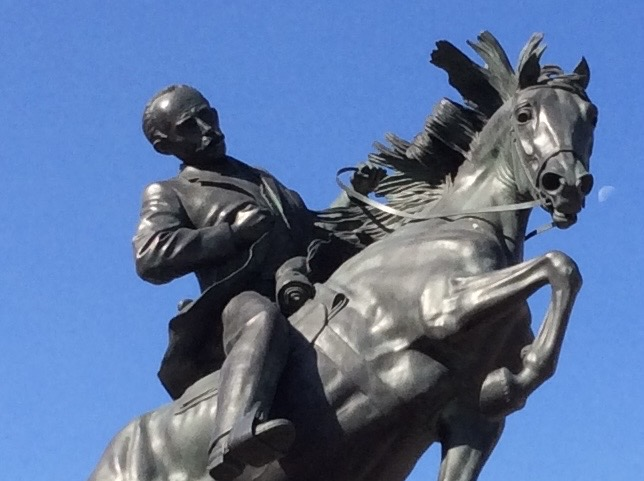
- Detail. Plaza 13 de Marzo in Habana, Cuba
- Artist: Anna Hyatt Huntington
- Medium: Bronze; granite
- Subject: José Martí
- Location: New York City, New York, U.S.; 40°45′57.8″N 73°58′33.9″W

A statue of José Martí by Anna Hyatt Huntington is installed in Manhattan's Central Park, in the U.S. state of New York.

A copy of the statue is centrally placed on Plaza13 de Marzo in Habana, Cuba.

== Description and history ==
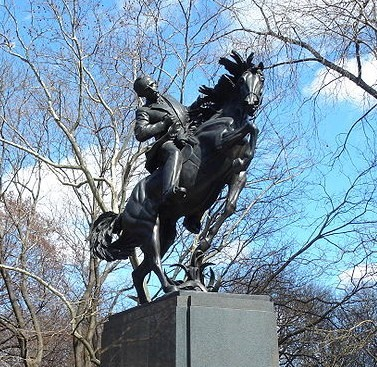
The statue in Central Park in 2006

The monument features a bronze sculpture resting on a dark Barre granite pedestal designed by the architectural firm Clarke & Rapuano and donated by the Cuban government. The statue was cast in 1959, dedicated in May 1965, and conserved by the Central Park Conservancy in 1992 with funds raised by Cuban-Americans.

An inscription on the east side of the base reads: "APOSTOL DE LA INDEPENDENCIA / DE CUBA GUIA DE LOS PUEBLOS / AMERICANOS Y PALADIN DE LA / DIGNIDAD HUMANA SU GENIO / LITERARIO RIVALIZA CON SU / CLARIVIDENCIA POLITICA NACIO / EN HABANA EL 28 DE ENERO DE / 1853. VIVIO QUINCE ANOS DE SU / DESTIERRO EN LA CIUDAD DE NUEVA / YORK MURIO EN EL COMBATE DE / DOS RIOS PROVINCIA DE ORIENTE / EL 19 DE MAYO DE 1895." An inscription on the base's west side reads, "APOSTLE OF CUBAN INDEPENDENCE / LEADER OF THE PEOPLES OF AMERICA / AND DEFENDER OF HUMAN DIGNITY / HIS LITERACY GENIUS VIED WITH HIS / POLITICAL FORESIGHT. HE WAS BORN / IN HAVANA ON JANUARY 28, 1853 / FOR FIFTEEN YEARS OF HIS EXILE HE LIVED IN THE CITY OF NEW YORK. / HE DIED IN ACTION AT DOS RIOS IN / ORIENTE PROVINCE ON MAY 19, 1895."

== See also ==
- 1959 in art
