= 161 West 93rd Street =

Building in New York City, United States

Coordinates: 40.79184°N 73.9709°W

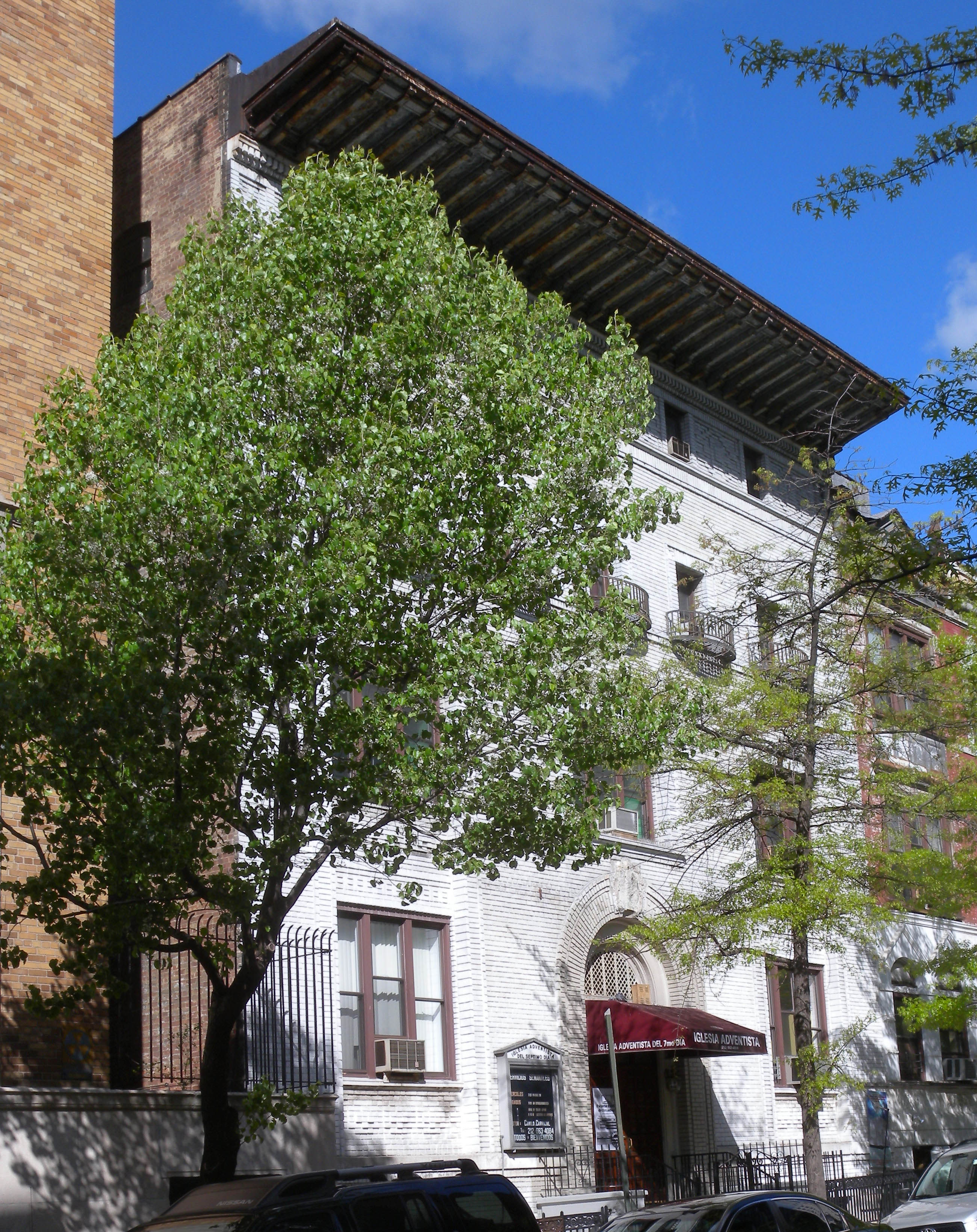
161 West 93rd Street

161 West 93rd Street is a building on 93rd Street in Manhattan that was once the home of the Nippon Club, a gentlemen's club for Japanese Americans and Japanese nationals.

The club, founded in 1905 by Jōkichi Takamine, first occupied a townhouse at 334 Riverside Drive, between 105th and 106th Streets. The Renaissance Revival building at 161 West 93rd Street was designed for the club by the architect John Vredenburgh Van Pelt and erected in 1912. The American Institute of Architects guide describes the style as "the Chicago school crossbred with Florence", remarking that "the cornice is extraordinary; it sails overhead with the assurance of Lorenzo de'Medici". Windows alternate with a brick frieze, in the manner of the Metopes and triglyphs of a Greek temple.

After the Japanese attack on Pearl Harbor, the building was seized by the federal government. In 1944, the Federal Office of the Alien Property Custodian sold the building to the Elks. Today, the building houses a church called Templo Adventista at its lower level and condominiums on the upper floors.
