= El Cid Campeador (sculpture) =

Equestrian statue by Anna Hyatt Huntington

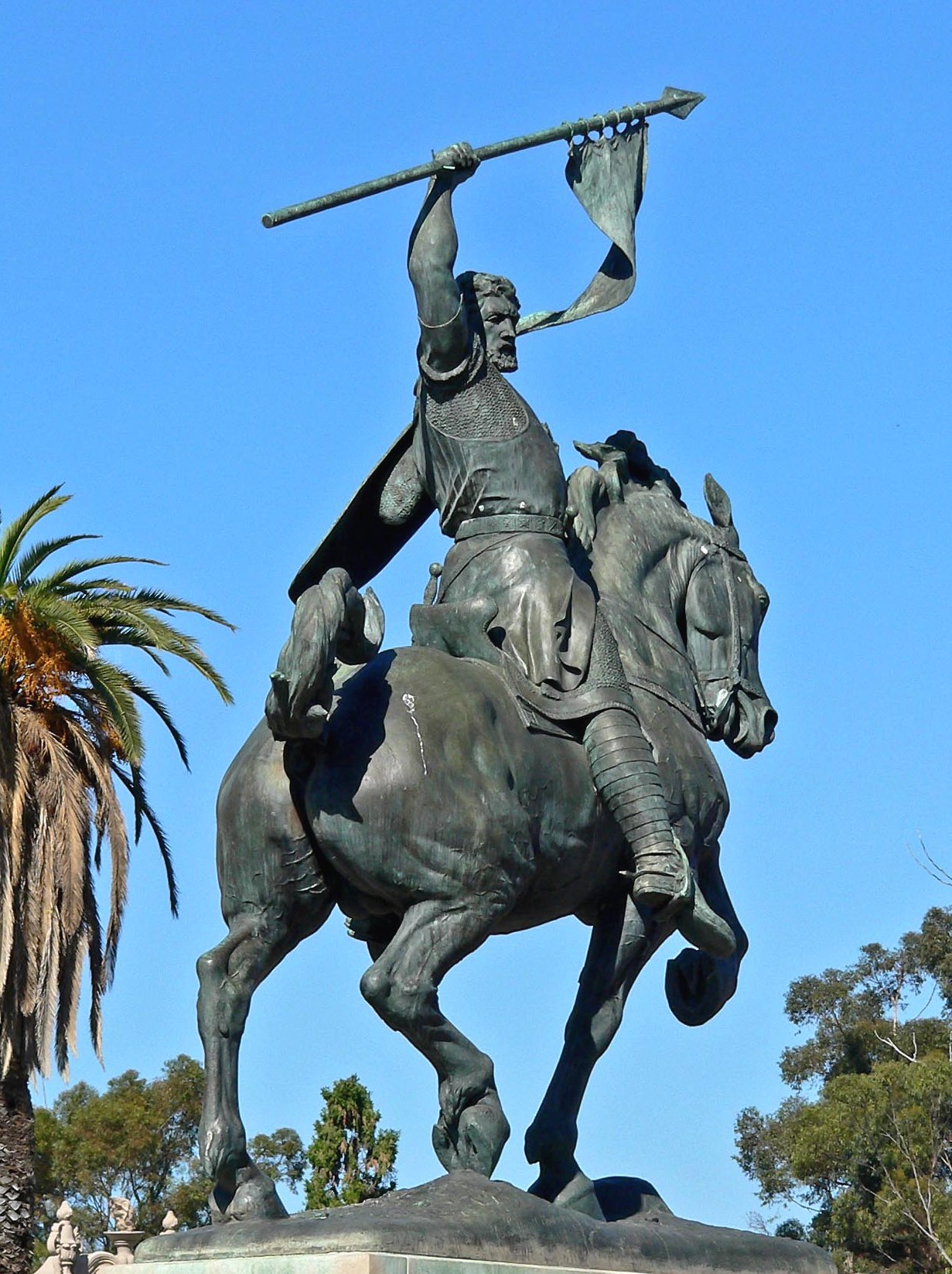
- The statue in 2006
- Artist: Anna Hyatt Huntington (sculptor); William Templeton Johnson (architect)
- Year: 1927
- Type: Sculpture
- Medium: Sculpture: bronze Base: concrete or Indiana limestone
- Subject: El Cid
- Condition: "Treatment needed" (1994)
- Location: San Diego, California, U.S.; 32°43′51″N 117°09′02″W

El Cid Campeador is an outdoor equestrian statue depicting the 11th-century Spanish knight and warlord El Cid by artist Anna Hyatt Huntington, architect William Templeton Johnson, and the foundry General Bronze Company, installed at Balboa Park's Plaza de Panama in San Diego, California. The bronze sculpture was created in 1927 and dedicated on July 5, 1930.

The statue measures approximately 11 ft × 9 ft × 7 ft (3.4 m × 2.7 m × 2.1 m), with a 16 ft (4.9 m) diameter, and its concrete or Indiana limestone base measures approximately 11 ft × 14 ft × 8 ft (3.4 m × 4.3 m × 2.4 m). It was surveyed and deemed "treatment needed" by the Smithsonian Institution's "Save Outdoor Sculpture!" program in March 1994.

Copies of Huntington's statue exist in other cities, including Buenos Aires, New York City, San Francisco, Seville, and Valencia. The New York cast is on the grounds of the Hispanic Society of America on Audubon Terrace in Manhattan. Anna Hyatt Huntington was the wife of Archer M. Huntington, the society's founder.

== Gallery ==
El Cid Campeador around the world
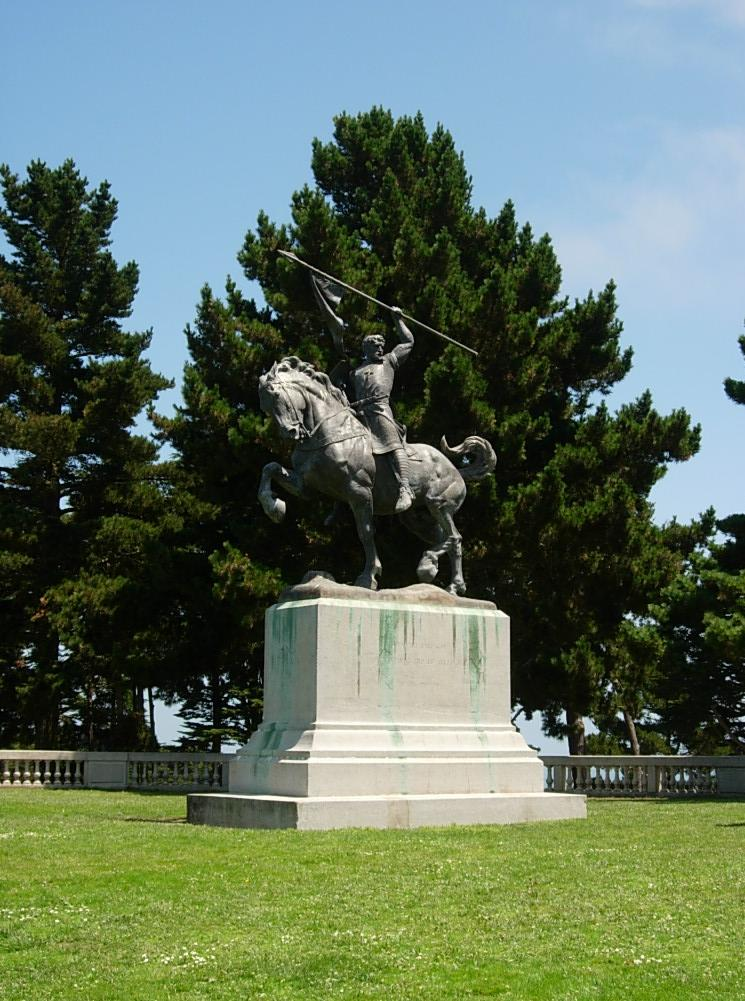
San Francisco

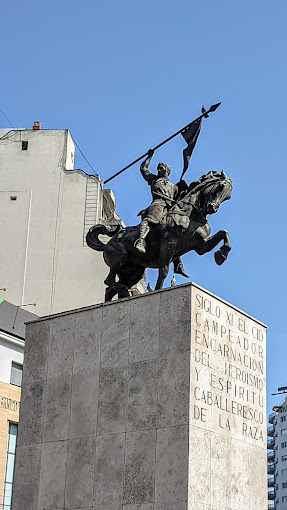
Buenos Aires, Argentina

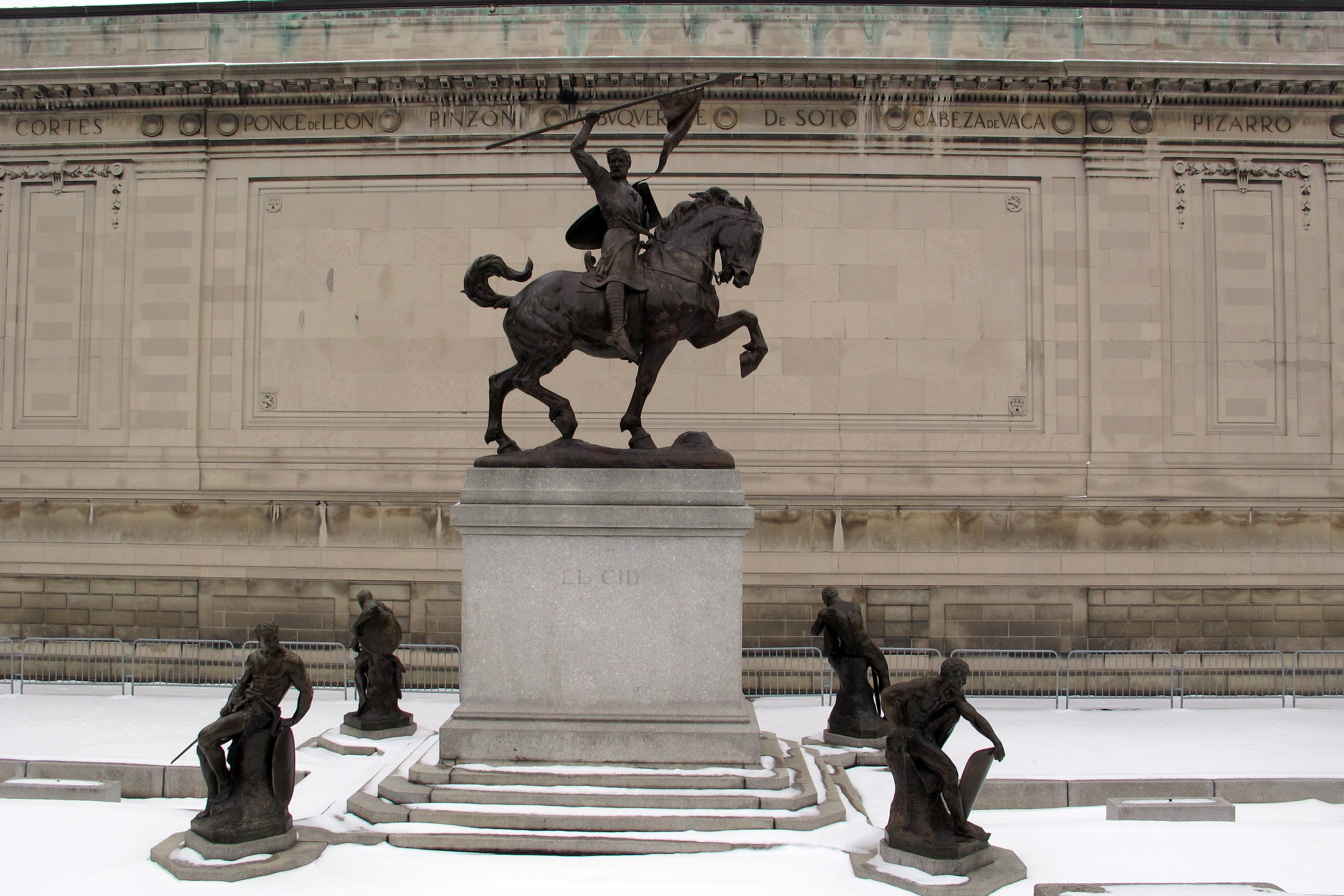
New York City

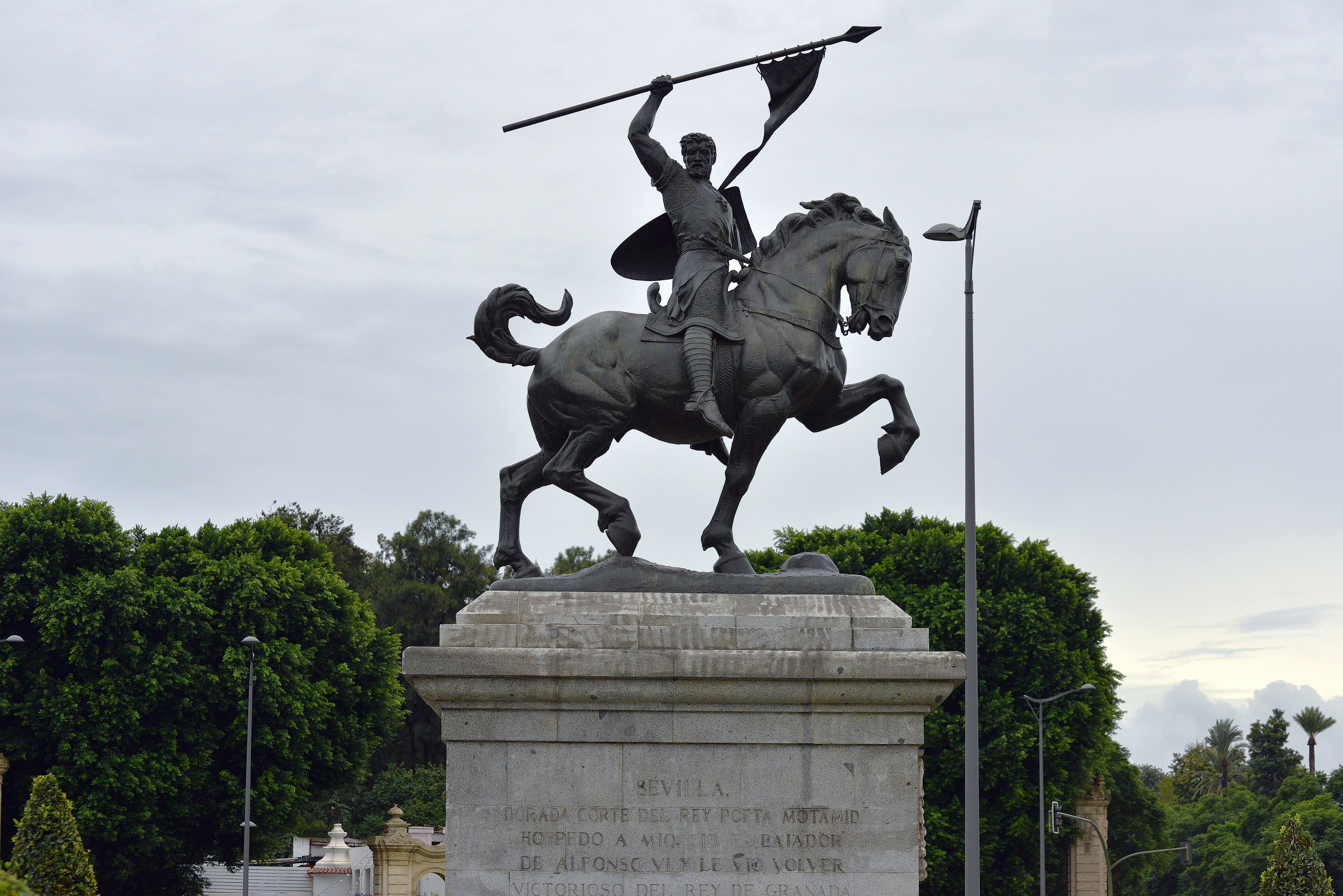
Seville, Spain

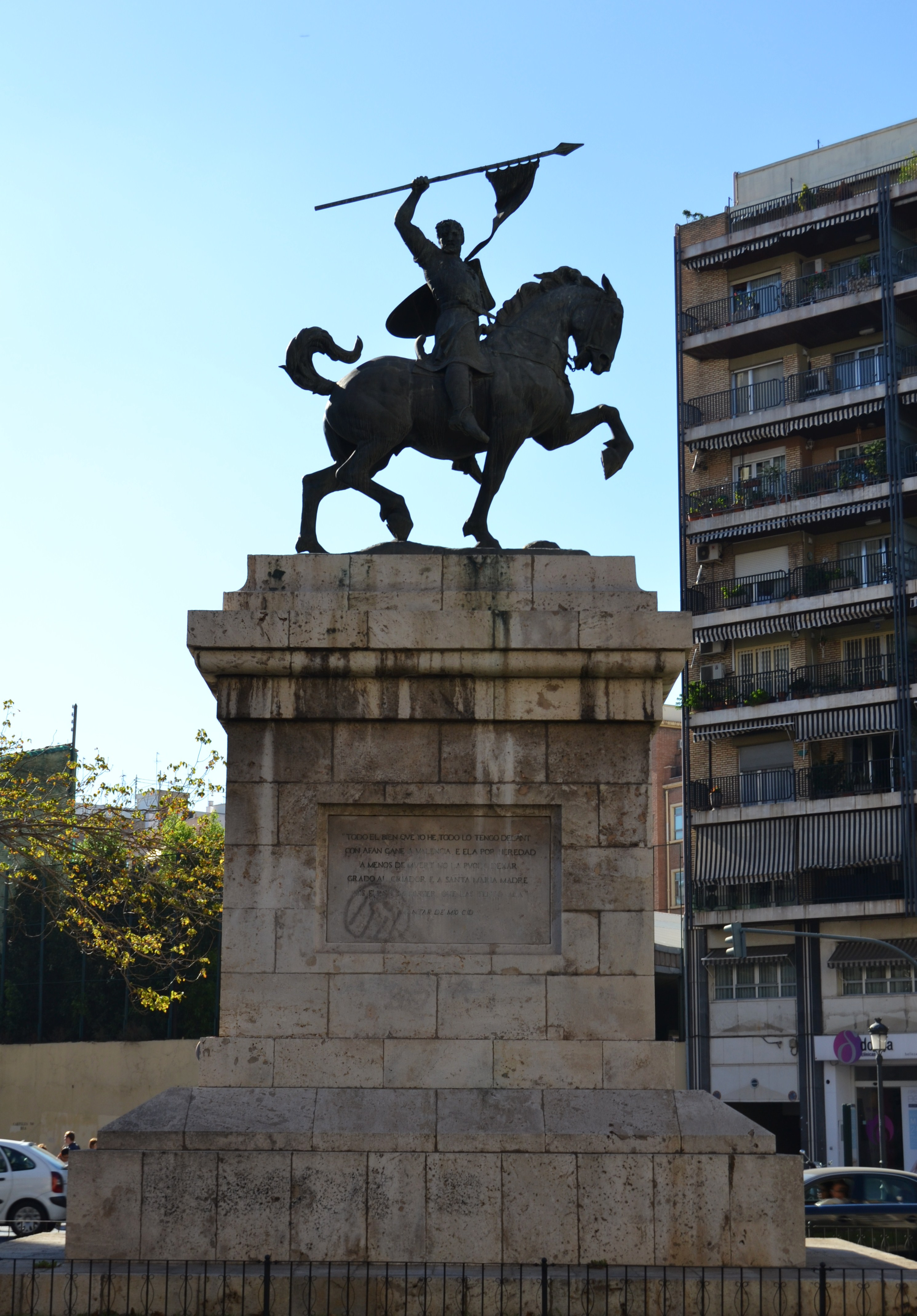
Valencia, Spain

== See also ==
- 1927 in art
