= Andrew Jackson State Park =

Park in South Carolina, United States

- Location within South Carolina
- Interactive map of Andrew Jackson State Park
- Nearest city: Lancaster, SC
- Coordinates: 34°50′28″N 80°48′25″W
- Area: 360 acres (145.7 ha)
- Created: 1952
- Other information: Features include: a museum

Andrew Jackson State Park is a 360-acre (1.5 km^{2}) South Carolina state park established in 1952 to honor the only South Carolina-born president, Andrew Jackson, who was born nearby in 1767. The park is on U.S. Highway 521 about nine miles north of Lancaster, South Carolina. The park offers hiking, boating, camping, fishing and picnicking. There are 25 camping spaces with paved road access. Each space has water hookup and electricity. They are often full on weekends, but not during the week. Nearby is a 20-acre lake with an island in the middle and hiking paths all the way around it. There is abundant Wildlife.

The park's museum features exhibits about the boyhood life of U.S. President Andrew Jackson, who grew up in this region. Rooms depict Colonial period life, including a dining room, bedroom, textile room, and early tools and farm implements.

A notable park feature is a large bronze statue called Andrew Jackson, A Boy of The Waxhaws, sculpted by Anna Hyatt Huntington, that depicts a young Jackson astride a farm horse. There is a marker recognizing Jackson's birthplace that was donated by the Daughters of the American Revolution. The park also includes a replica of a late 18th-century one-room schoolhouse and an amphitheatre.

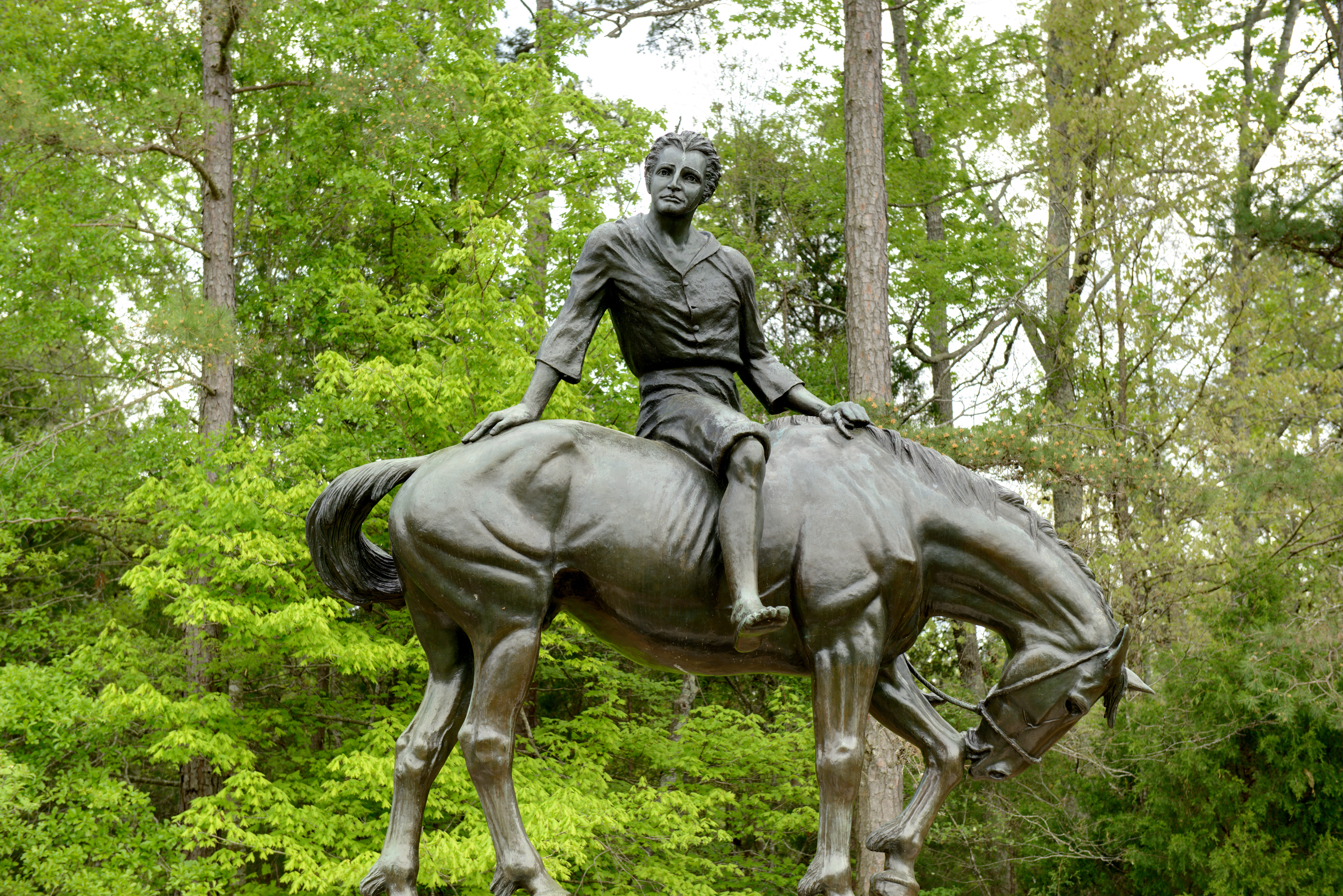
Large bronze statue of Andrew Jackson at Andrew Jackson State Park, Lancaster, SC. sculpted by Anna Hyatt Huntington.

== See also ==
- List of South Carolina state parks
- Presidential memorials in the United States
