= Marion Boyd Allen =

American painter

- Born: October 23, 1862; Boston, Massachusetts, USA
- Died: December 28, 1941 (aged 79); Boston, Massachusetts, US
- Education: School of the Museum of Fine Arts, Boston
- Known for: painting
- Spouse: William Augustus Allen (m. 1905; died in 1911)

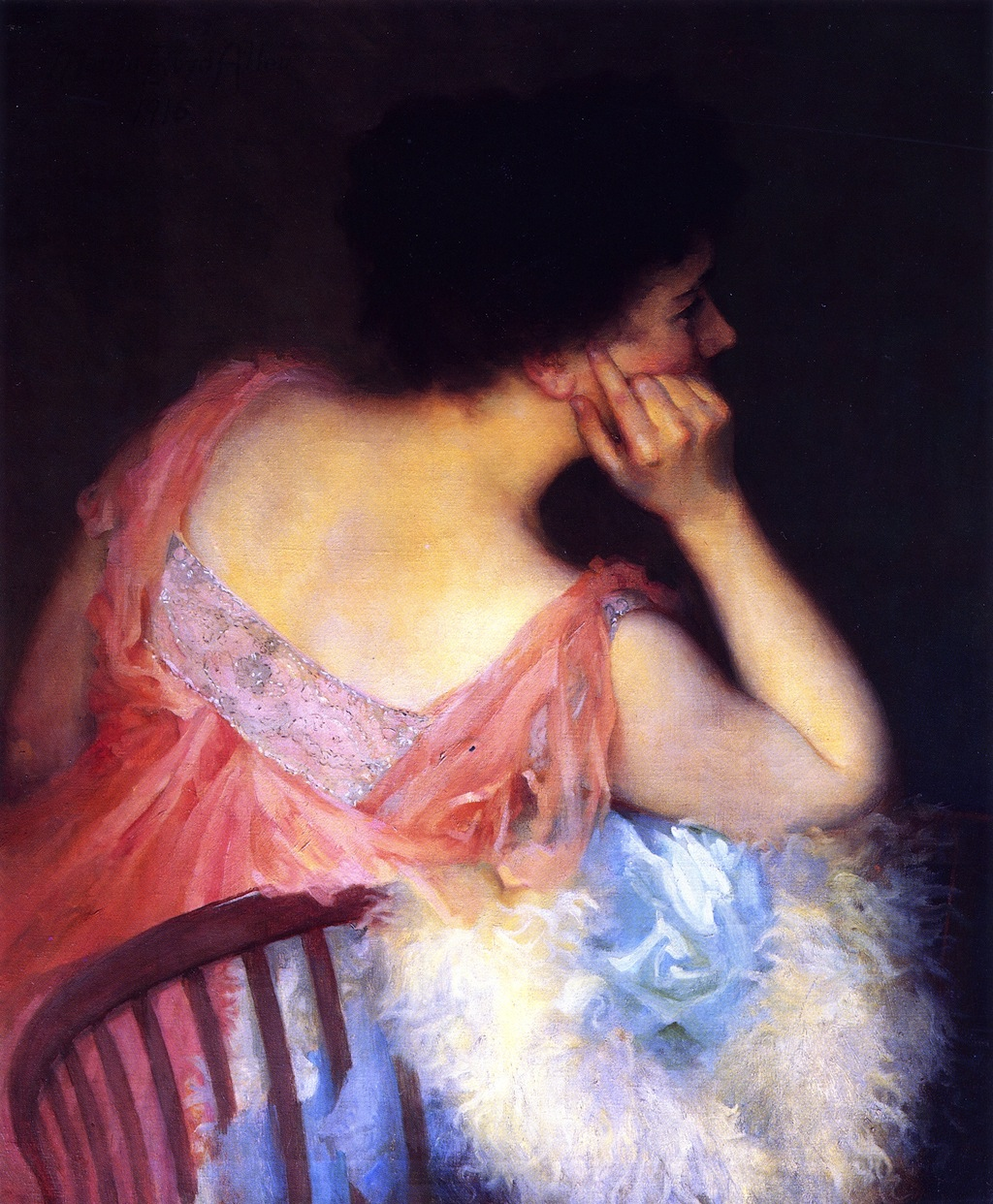
Portrait of a Woman in a Pink Dress, 1916

Marion Boyd Allen (23 October 1862 – 28 December 1941) was an American painter, known for her portraits and landscapes.

== Family and early life ==
Allen was born in Boston in 1862 to Stillman Boyd Allen, an attorney and state legislator, and Harriet Smith Allen, née Seaward. She was sister to Willis Boyd Allen, author of The Mountaineers. When Allen was young, her parents took her on a European vacation, where she first decided to become a painter after sketching the Alps. Unfortunately, Allen had to postpone her artistic education for several years, as she devoted much of her life as a young adult to caring for her sick mother.

She married her father's cousin, William Augustus Allen, in 1905. Allen was widowed only six years later in 1911.

== Education and career ==
Encouraged by landscape artist Charles H. Davis, Allen entered the Boston Museum School in 1896 at the age of 36, where she studied under Frank Weston Benson, Edmund C. Tarbell and Philip Hale; she received her diploma in 1909.

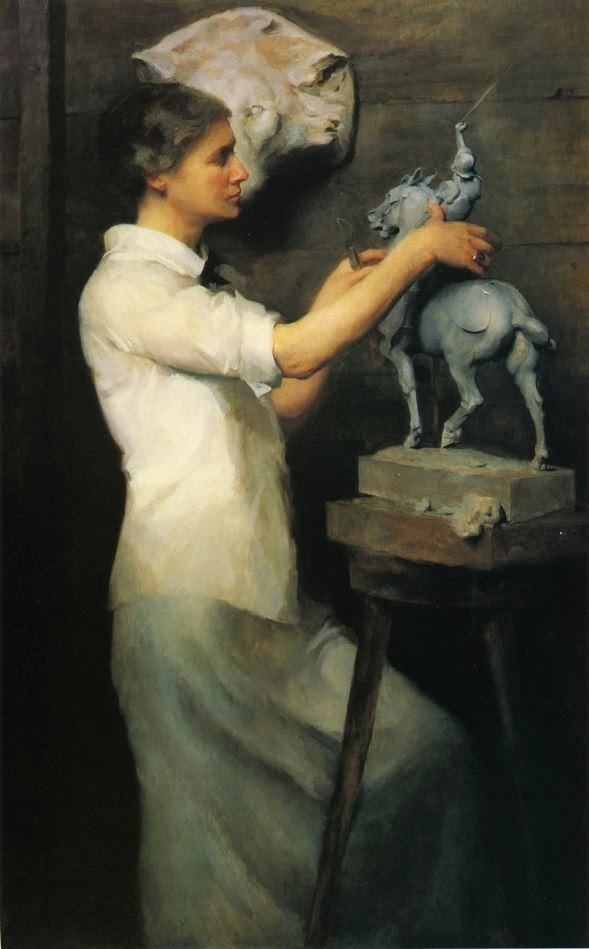
Portrait of Anna Vaughn Hyatt, 1915

After graduation, Allen gained particular recognition for her portraits. She exhibited in group shows at the Société Nationale des Beaux-Arts, Paris; National Arts Club, New York; Corcoran Gallery of Art, Washington, DC; and the Cincinnati Art Museum, among others. After graduation, she held a solo exhibition at the Copley Society Gallery in 1910, and continued to exhibit there until about 1930. Some of her other solo exhibitions were held at the Ferargil Galleries in New York in 1928, Bose Galleries in Boston in 1929 and 1930, Argent Galleries in New York in 1931, 1932 and 1934, and the Boston Art Club in 1936. Her career took off after her painting Enameling was included in the Panama–Pacific International Exposition in 1915. Her life-sized portrait of Anna Vaughn Hyatt won the Newport Art Association's popular prize in 1919. On March 8, 1924, her half-length figure study A Girl of the Orient made the cover of The Literary Digest. Her particular strengths were considered to be her skill with portraits and drawing, a “natural feeling for color”, and her ability to carry the energy of her first sketches through to the finished product.

From 1925 to 1936, she traveled to the American West and Canadian Rockies, sketching and painting landscapes, including national landmarks such as the Grand Canyon and Mount Rainier. She climbed mountains and at times lived in isolated cabins to reach vantage points to paint her subjects. She also spent time in Arizona, driving up to one thousand miles across the desert and scaling long ladders to reach Native American ruins. Allen painted several portraits of Native Americans while in the Southwest and often exhibited her portraits in frames carved by local craftsmen.

She continued to exhibit her work and win awards, like the New Haven Paint and Clay Club prize, and the Hudson prize from the Connecticut Academy of Fine Arts, at a time when landscape painting was almost exclusively a male-dominated field. In 1932 she attended an event by the Woman’s Club of Newton Centre in Massachusetts, whose purpose was to exhibit women’s achievements in art. She was described as having “attained international prominence”. Some other artists present were Margaret Fitzhugh Browne, Gertrude Fiske, Lilian Westcott Hale, Laura Coombs Hills, Lilla Cabot Perry, and Anna Coleman Ladd. Some of her most characteristic paintings are The Green Veil, Air Castles, The Morning Stint, and Enameling.

== Legacy ==
Allen's 1915 portrait of Anna Vaughan Hyatt was included in the inaugural exhibition of the National Museum of Women in the Arts, American Women Artists 1830–1930, in 1987.
