= Discovery Museum and Planetarium =

Coordinates: 41.214°N 73.2334°W

Discovery Science Center and Planetarium
- Former name: Discovery Museum and Planetarium
- Established: 1958
- Location: 4450 Park Avenue, Bridgeport, Connecticut
- Type: Science Center
- Visitors: 65,000+ (annual)
- Owner: Board of Trustees
- Website: http://www.shudiscovery.org/
- Executive Director: Carla Murphy
- Board Chairmen: Michael L. Iannazzi and Brad Dancer

The Discovery Science Center and Planetarium is a children's science museum in Bridgeport, Connecticut, that serves as both a tourist destination and an educational resource for area schools. The Discovery Science Center provides educational programs, planetarium presentations, the Challenger Learning Center, Science on a Sphere and a variety of permanent and traveling exhibits, to increase science awareness among the area's children.

== History ==
The Discovery Science Center was founded in 1958 and opened to the public in 1962 as the Museum of Art, Science, and Industry. It sits on leased land in an agreement that extends until 2088. It was designed by noted architect John M. Johansen, one of the Harvard Five.

In 2018, the museum received a $1.8 million grant from the state of Connecticut to upgrade the planetarium, improve exhibits and classroom and theater spaces, undertake energy conservation improvements, elevator upgrades and replace the roof on the Wonder Workshop building.

In 2020, the center closed in March to COVID-19, but then remained closed due to financial reasons. The 18-month closing allowed the museum to complete the 2018 renovation project.

As of January 2021, the museum is managed as a part of Sacred Heart University.

In September 2021, the museum officially reopened as the Discovery Science Center & Planetarium.

== STEM Learning Programs ==
Discovery Science Center offers hands-on STEM Learning Programs including over 80 Educational Programs for school field trips, scout troops, and special events. Discovery's Education staff can customize a package to align with curriculum goals. Discovery Science Center runs 8 weeks of Summer STEM Programs for young learners in grades K-9 with new topics featured each week. Special weekend events are offered throughout the year on topics such as Aeronautics, Space Exploration, Earth Science, and Engineering. These special events feature activities offered by science center staff and partners including local universities, businesses and manufacturers, local STEM professionals, and more.

== Challenger Learning Center ==
The Challenger Learning Center is part of a global network of Challenger Learning Centers use space-themed simulated learning and role-playing strategies to help students bring their classroom studies to life and cultivate skills needed for future success, such as problem solving, critical thinking, communication and teamwork. One of 48 locations globally, The Discovery Science Center is home to Connecticut's only Challenger Learning Center.

== Henry B. duPont III Planetarium ==
The Discovery Science Center's Planetarium features a 33 feet (10 m) domed ceiling, seats up to 85 people and was most recently upgraded in 2021. Presentations are made with a Digistar projection system.

== Science on a Sphere ==
The lower level of the science center features Science On a Sphere (SOS). SOS is a room-sized, global display system that uses computers and video projectors to display planetary data on a six-foot diameter animated globe. This exhibit opened in early 2016 at Discovery Science Center's annual Space Day event, and is available to guests and groups with hundreds of data sets available for viewing. Developed by researchers at National Oceanic and Atmospheric Administration (NOAA) as an educational tool that illustrates Earth System science, SOS transforms real-time data from the Earth and other planets into detailed graphic representations.
