= 93rd Street (Manhattan) =

West-east street in Manhattan, New York

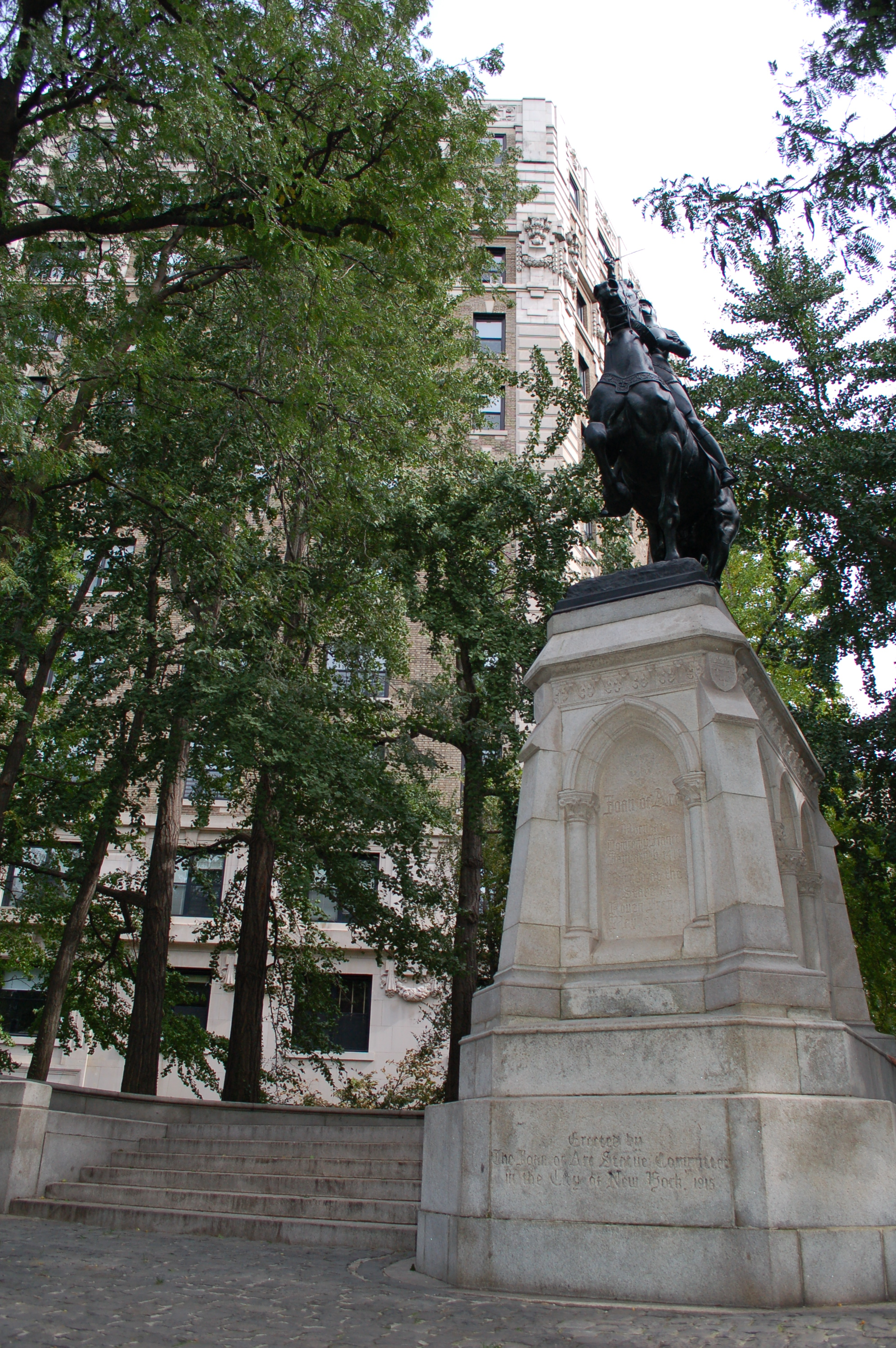
- Jeanne d'Arc monument, located at West 93rd Street and Riverside Drive
- Maintained by: NYCDOT
- Length: 1.2 mi (1.9 km)
- Width: 60 feet (18.29 m)
- Location: Manhattan
- Postal code: 10024 (west), 10128 (east)
- Coordinates: 40°47′00″N 73°57′03″W
- West end: Riverside Drive
- East end: First Avenue
- North: 94th Street
- South: 93rd Street

Construction
- Commissioned: 1811

93rd Street is a one-way street in the New York City borough of Manhattan. Like most Uptown Manhattan east–west streets crossing Central Park, it is split in two segments. Its west segment traverses the Upper West Side and runs from Riverside Drive to Central Park West, while its east segment traverses the Upper East Side and runs from 5th Avenue to East End Avenue.

The portion of the street between Madison and Fifth Avenue is part of the Carnegie Hill Historic District.

A notable monument to Joan of Arc by Anna Hyatt Huntington stands at the street's western terminus at Riverside Park.

In 2025, the section of the street near West End Avenue was named Malachy McCourt Lane, after American-Irish actor, writer and politician Malachy McCourt.

== History ==
The block of 93rd on the Upper East Side was nearly empty until 1888, when some row houses on 57 and 61 East 93rd were built. Some small apartment buildings were then built in 1891 from 62 to 72 East 93rd Street. The Alamo, located at 55 East 93rd Street, was built in 1900.

== Notable buildings ==
- Columbia Grammar & Preparatory School
- 161 West 93rd Street, built by the Nippon Club
- The Spence School occupies the former William Goadby and Florence Baker Loew House.
- Congregation Shaare Zedek, in a former Neoclassical building from 1922, demolished in 2019 and since redeveloped as a Modernist building.
- The Joan of Arc Junior High School in an Art Deco building between Amsterdam and Columbus avenues.
- The Gothic Revival Lutheran Church of the Advent, 1900, on the northeast corner of Broadway.
- 75 E 93rd St - Synod of the Russian Orthodox Church Outside Russia - formerly the Francis Palmer House / George F Baker Mansion—the former mansion of General Winfield Scott was located here as well
- 60 East 93rd Street- Formerly the Virginia Graham Fair Vanderbilt house. The mansion now serves as a gallery for Carlton Hobbs LLC, an antique dealer specializing in fine European furniture and works of art.

The 93rd Street Beautification Association works to preserve and enhance the street where it runs through Carnegie Hill.

== Notable residents ==
- The Marx Brothers lived here at 179 East 93rd Street.
- Larry Ray (born 1959), criminal convicted of sex trafficking, extortion, forced labor, and other offenses, sentenced to 60 years in prison
- Jackie Robinson lived at 33 West 93rd Street for a year and a half in the 1960s.
