= Collis P. Huntington State Park =

State park in Fairfield County, Connecticut

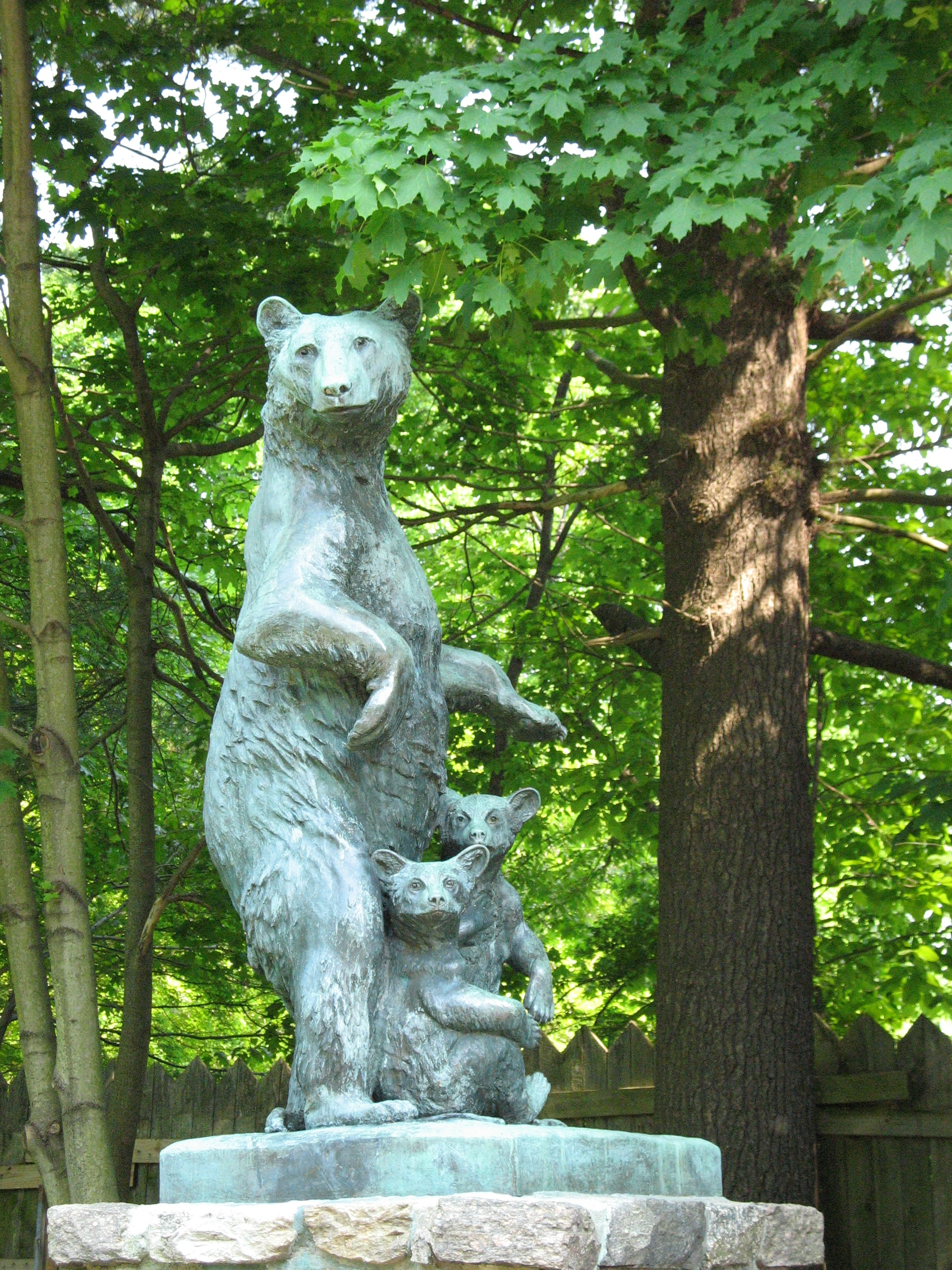

- Location within Connecticut Location within the United States
- Interactive map of Collis P. Huntington State Park
- Location: Redding, Newtown & Bethel, Connecticut, United States
- Coordinates: 41°21′00″N 73°21′18″W
- Area: 883 acres (357 ha)
- Elevation: 791 ft (241 m)
- Established: 1973
- Administrator: Connecticut Department of Energy and Environmental Protection
- Designation: Connecticut state park
- Website: Official website

Collis P. Huntington State Park is a public recreation area covering 1,017 acres (412 ha) in the towns of Redding, Newtown, and Bethel in Fairfield County, Connecticut. The state park is noted for Anna Hyatt Huntington's sculptures of bears and wolves that welcome visitors at the park entrance. Her work can also be seen in the heroic sculpture of General Israel Putnam at Putnam Memorial State Park in Redding. The park bears the name of railroad magnate Collis Potter Huntington, whose heirs donated the lands to the state. The park's web of multi-use trails is open to hikers, cyclists, and equestrians. The park is managed by the Connecticut Department of Energy and Environmental Protection.

== History ==
Under the late 19th-century ownership of Commodore Walter Luttgen, a New York banker, industrialist and yachtsman, park-like features were added to the landscape including service roads, trails, and artificial ponds. One of Luttgen's improvements, a miniature stone lighthouse, may still be seen. The remains of a small steam paddlewheeler that once plied the ponds have not been found.

Joseph E. Sterrett, a principal with the accounting firm of Price, Waterhouse, acquired the estate, including its mansion, Villa Linta, following Luttgen's death in 1922. After Villa Linta burned down, the land was purchased by Archer M. Huntington, the philanthropist stepson of industrialist Collis Potter Huntington. He and his wife Anna Hyatt Huntington changed its name to Stanerigg and moved to the estate in 1939 to pursue their various interests: she as creator of works of realistic sculpture, he as poet, Spanish scholar, and patron of the arts. The park was opened to the public following Anna Huntington's death in 1973.

== Geology ==
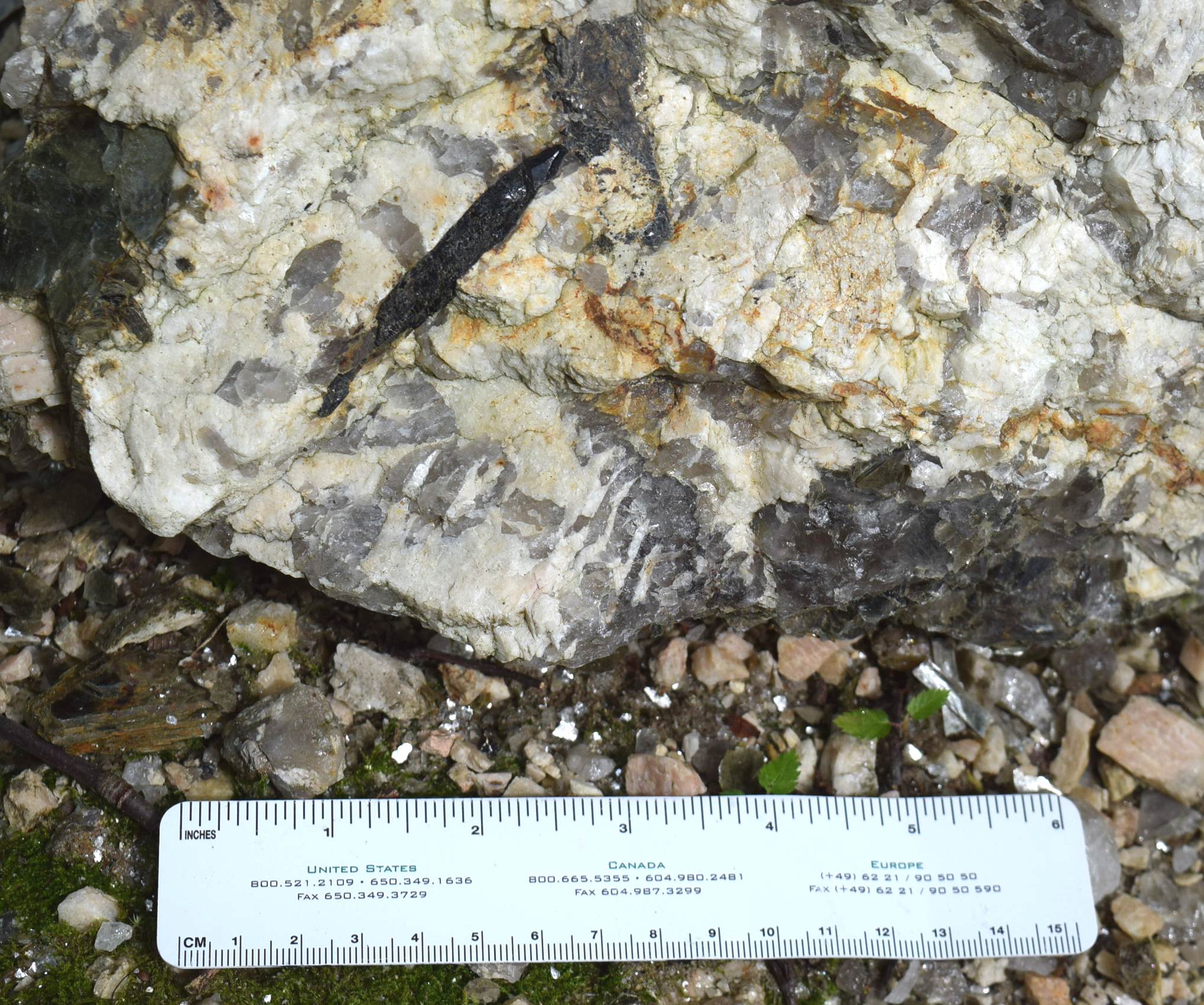
Tourmaline (the black and long prismatic crystal) in a Pegmatite; photographed in the former Biermann Quarry.

The pegmatite in the northern part of the park was mined for mica and feldspar and contains minerals like tourmaline.

== Activities and amenities ==
The park has trails for hiking, mountain biking, horseback riding, and cross-country skiing. Trails include the northern section of the Aspetuck Valley Trail, which connects with the adjacent Centennial Watershed State Forest. Park ponds are available for canoeing and fishing. Archery-only deer hunting is offered from mid-September through December.
