= Natalie Van Vleck =

American artist and conservationist (1901–1981)

Natalie Van Vleck (October 19, 1901 – December 25, 1981) was an American visual artist and the founder of Flanders Nature Center & Land Trust. She is considered among the earliest women modernist visual artists working in a cubist style.

== Early life and education ==
Natalie Van Vleck was born on October 19, 1901 in New York City, the only child of Edward Wakeman Van Vleck and Bertha Macy Van Vleck. Her father was a stockbroker and his side of the family descended from the founders of New Amsterdam, now known as New York City, while her mother was part of the Macy family of New York. The home of the affluent household was in Morristown, New Jersey. As a child, Van Vleck attended the private Brearley School in New York, graduating in 1919. While at the Brearley School she would study after school and on the weekends at the Art Students League of New York under the mentorship of portrait painter Agnes Richmond. In a letter sent to Van Vleck in response to a question about full-time study at the League, Agnes Richmond wrote:

I would enter Mr. Henri's class, and try it at once...you will find him interesting and very likeable but do not take any teacher too seriously. Look inside yourself to see what you are developing in your own way. Art schools kills as many artists as they make. You have something very precious of your own. That means, take all you can from Mr. Henri and everyone you study with, but study yourself along the way.

From 1919 to 1922, Van Vleck continued her studies full time at the Art Students League of New York both under the mentorship of Agnes Richmond, George Bridgman, and Robert Henri. In 1921 and 1922 she took classes with Max Weber, which turned her artistic influence to cubism and abstraction.

== Artwork, style, and influences ==
Beginning in 1922, Van Vleck began traveling abroad to find inspiration for her artworks, starting in Mallorca and over the years traveling to Saint Malo, the islands of French Polynesia, Martinique, and Guadeloupe where she would spend months at a time painting. Her work during this time consisted of abstract landscapes and scenes from life on the islands. After her travels she returned to New York City and opened a studio at 149 E 45th Street, where she explored creating wood carvings and other art media and held an exhibition.

In December 1926, Van Vleck's parents purchased a farm and house on Flanders Road in Woodbury, Connecticut and made it their permanent home in the summer of 1927. In 1928, Van Vleck built an art studio on the grounds near her parents house that included a bedroom and bathroom. Here she spent time painting and woodworking while also traveling to Dominica in 1929 and Tahiti and Mo'orea in 1930 and 1931. In 1932, her paintings from these travels helped form a one-woman show in New York at the Brownell-Lamberston Galleries, and the following year an exhibition at Macy Galleries titled "Autumn Exhibition of Modern Painting, Sculpture and Prints". In 1934, she stopped painting and began to dedicate her time to farming and nature conservancy, although she did loan paintings for an exhibition at The Little Shop, Woodbury Inn, in 1937 and Town & Country Club, Hartford in 1938.

== Personal life and death ==
In 1935, Van Vleck entered a local turkey shoot beating 150 other competitors and winning first place. This set her on a path of turkey farming over the next two decades, eventually moving into raising sheep and growing crops. When Van Vleck's mother died in 1942 and father in 1943 she inherited the land on Flanders Road and began acquiring more property and expanding the farm. In 1963, she converted all of her property into a farm sanctuary and nature preserve which was incorporated in Connecticut as the nonprofit Flanders Nature Center & Land Trust and currently holds over 2,100 acres (850 hectares) of open space across Woodbury, Bethlehem, Southbury, and Middlebury.

Van Vleck's preference for masculine clothing and gender-neutral appearance can be seen in portraits and photographs of her from that time, including a notable portrait of her by fellow-artist Elsie Driggs.

Natalie Van Vleck died on December 25, 1981, in her home.

== Exhibitions and public collections ==
- Smithsonian Institution
- Flanders Nature Center & Land Trust (2025)
- Mattatuck Museum (2018–2019)
- Harvard Art Museums
- Woodbury Public Library
- The Little Shop, Woodbury Inn (1937)
- Town & Country Club, Hartford (1938)
- Brown-Lambertson Galleries (1932)
- Macy Galleries (1928, 1933)
