= Aspetuck River =

River in Connecticut, United States

Coordinates: 41.2319°N 73.3231°W

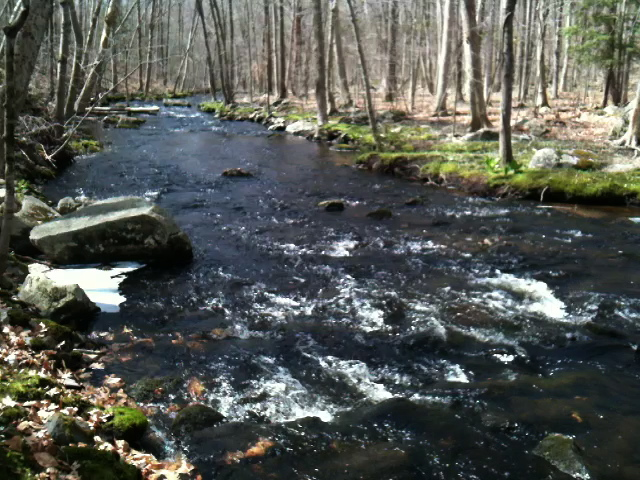
A stretch of the river in Redding.

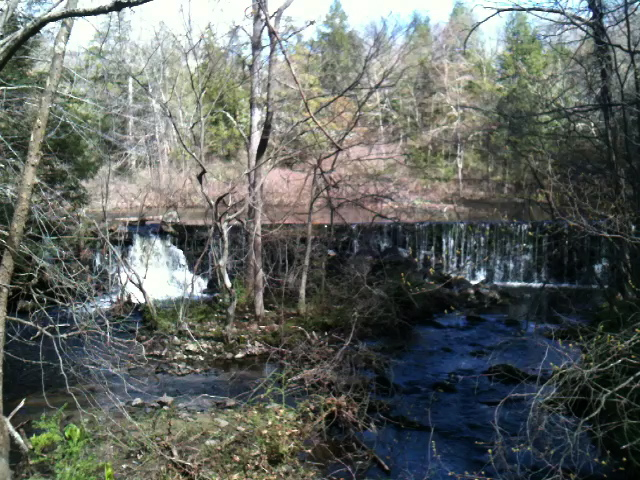
Hedmon's Pond Waterfall in Redding.

The Aspetuck River is a 17.0-mile-long (27.4 km) river in the U.S. state of Connecticut. The river rises in the hills located in Huntington State Park in Bethel, with a watershed of approximately 430 acres (170 ha). The river flows generally southerly through Redding, Connecticut, to the Aspetuck Reservoir, and finally into the Saugatuck River in Westport, Connecticut and then into the Long Island Sound. It flows through the village of Aspetuck at an average depth of 2.5 feet (0.76 m). The word Aspetuck can be translated as "river originating at the high place" in an Algonquian language.

The Aspetuck Reservoir is fed water diverted from the Saugatuck Reservoir via an underground aqueduct. Water from the Aspetuck Reservoir is also diverted into the Hemlock Reservoir in Easton and Fairfield, which then flows into the Mill River.

== Recreation ==
=== Hiking ===
The Aspetuck Valley Trail is a Blue-Blazed Trail that follows the general course of the river.

== Water quality ==
The Aspetuck is one of the cleanest rivers in the state, with an AA rating.

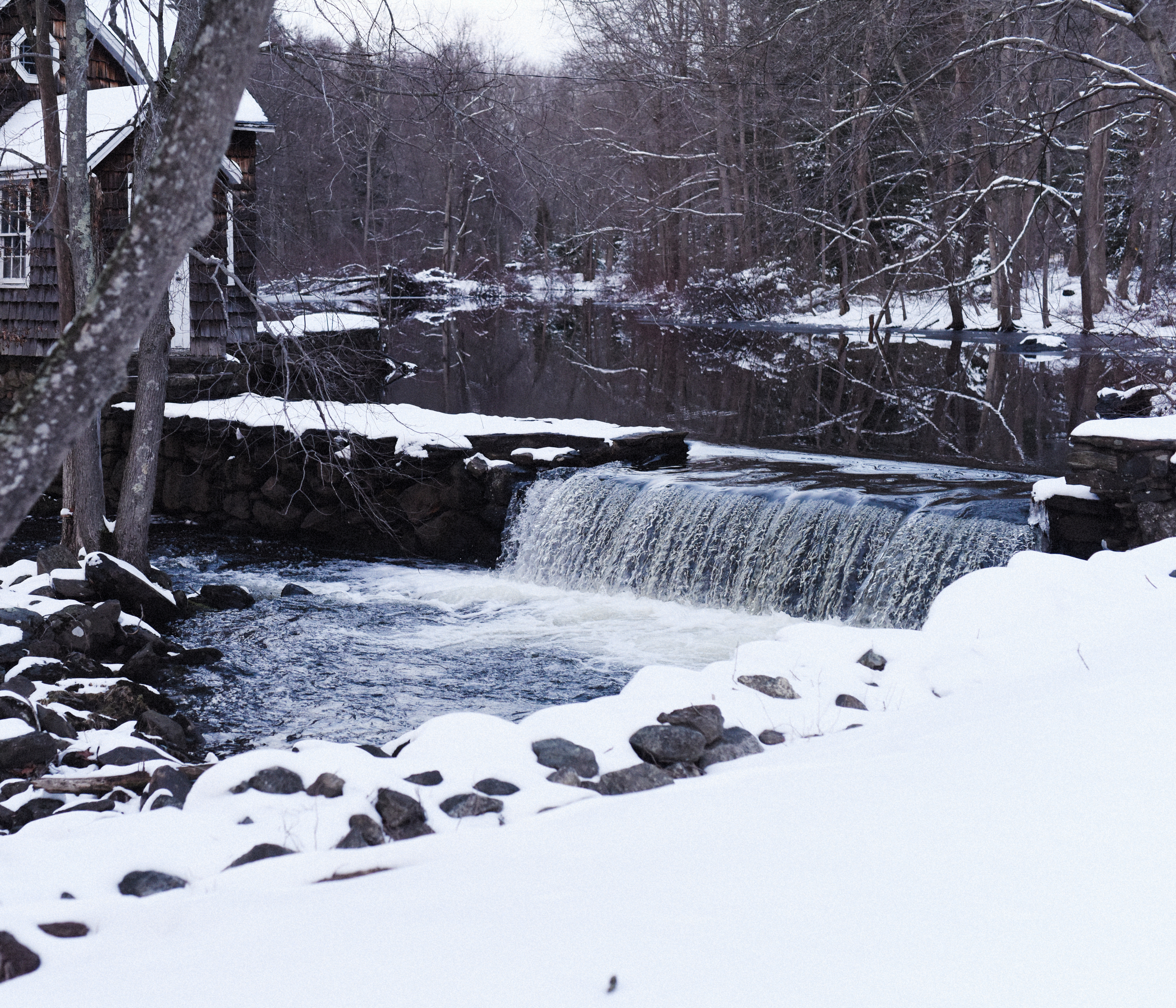
The Grist Mill is located on Old Redding Rd, in Aspetuck, CT.

== See also ==
- List of rivers of Connecticut
- East Aspetuck River
