= Aspetuck Valley Trail =

Hiking trail in Connecticut, United States

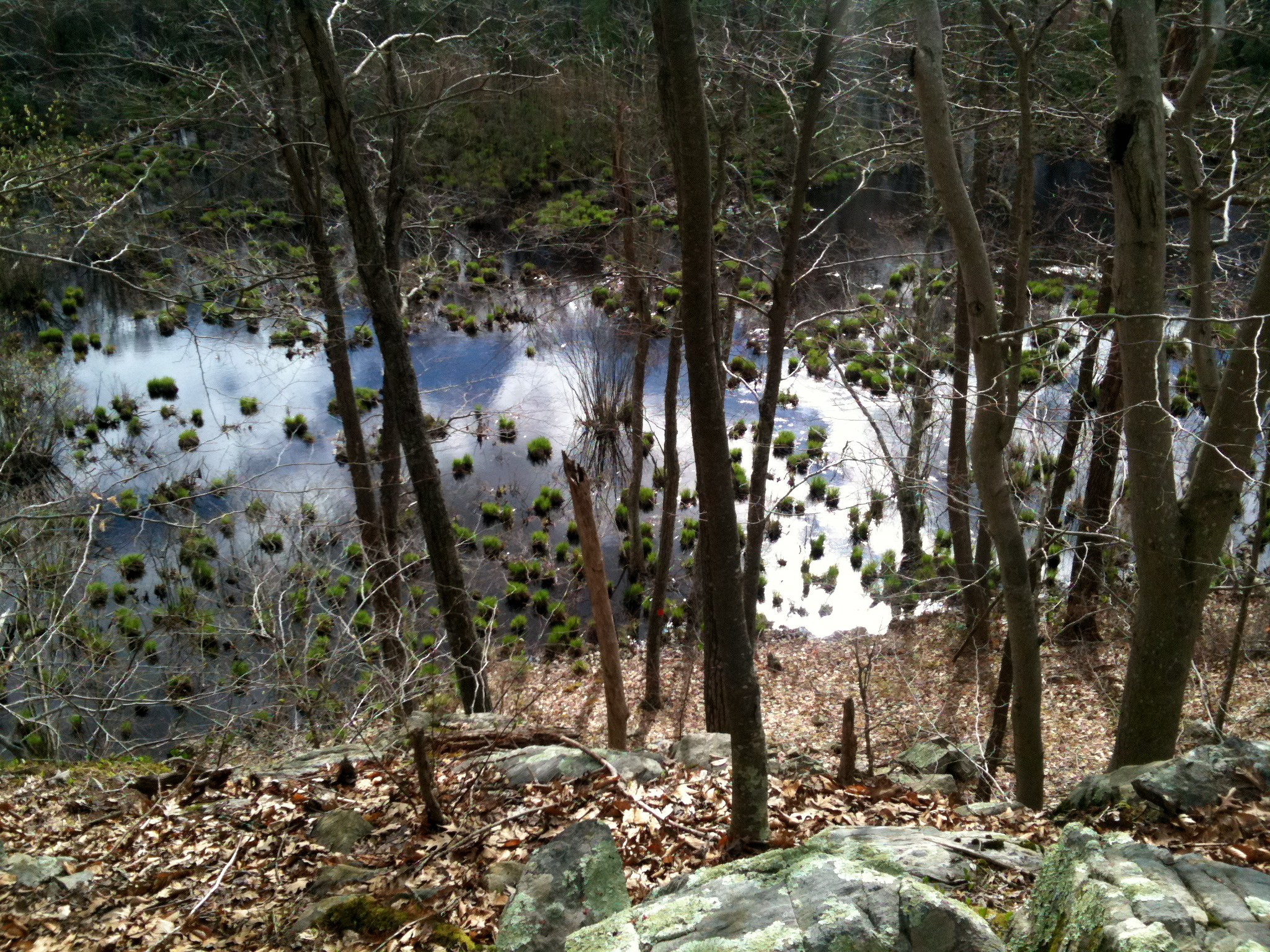
- Bog mirroring clouds and sky in Aspetuck Valley from the Aspetuck Valley Trail, Newtown, Connecticut.
- Length: 5.9 mi (9.5 km)
- Location: Newtown, Redding and Easton Connecticut
- Designation: CFPA Blue-Blazed Trail
- Trailheads: Rock House Road (Valley Road intersection) in Easton Connecticut. Collis P. Huntington State Park near Hopewell Road in Redding Connecticut.
- Use: hiking, cross-country skiing, snowshoeing, fishing, geocaching, other
- Highest point: Collis P. Huntington State Park
- Lowest point: Aspetuck River
- Difficulty: easy, with very few difficult sections
- Sights: Aspetuck River, Hedmon's Pond Dam
- Hazards: hunters, deer ticks, poison ivy

The Aspetuck Valley Trail is a 5.9-mile (9.5 km) Blue-Blazed hiking trail in the Aspetuck River Valley area of Fairfield County in the towns of Newtown, Easton and Redding Connecticut.

The trail follows the Aspetuck River through Centennial Watershed State Forest and Aspetuck Land Trust parcels. The Aspetuck Valley Trail is a mostly straight linear north to south trail. The northern end of the trail veers eastward to connect to the local trail system in the Collis P. Huntington State Park.

Notable features include the Poverty Hollow and Valley scenic roads, Aspetuck River, bogs, the dam on Hedmon's pond, modest high points and scenic overlooks as well as several stone fences.

The trail opened on June 2, 2007, after the 19th edition of the Connecticut Walk Book West had gone to press in 2006. The Aspetuck Valley Trail is maintained largely through the efforts of the Connecticut Forest and Park Association and the Nature Conservancy.

== Trail description ==
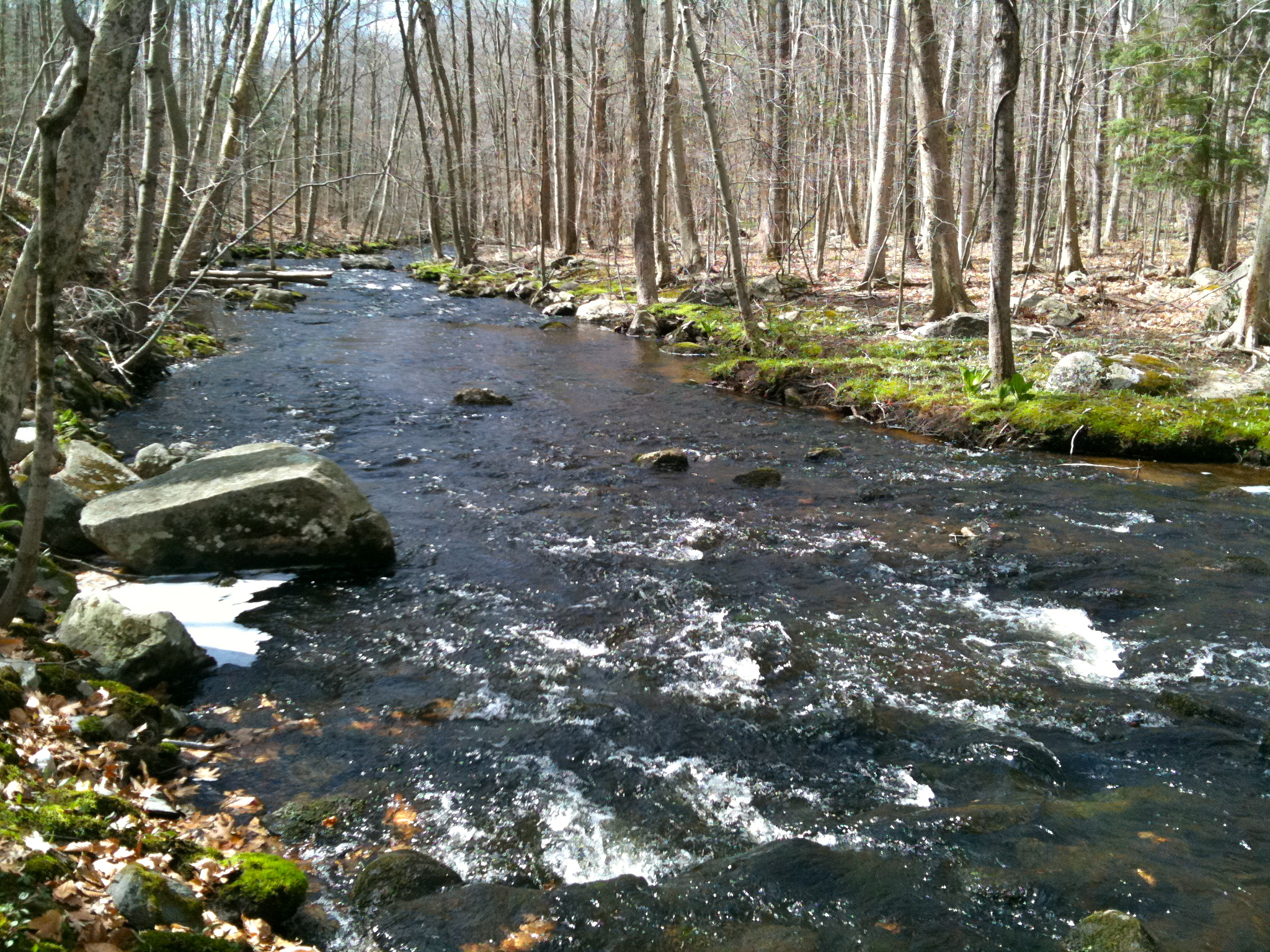
Aspetuck River from Aspetuck Valley Trail in Redding, CT.

The Aspetuck Valley Trail is primarily used for hiking, backpacking, picnicking, and in the winter, snowshoeing.

Portions of the trail are suitable for, and are used for, cross-country skiing. Site-specific activities enjoyed along the route include hunting (very limited), fishing, horseback riding, bouldering and rock climbing (limited). There are signs at the trail heads forbidding mountain biking but they are periodically ignored. Evidence of horse riding and hunting can be found along the trail.

The trail is wooded except for the road walks along Stepney and Foundry roads. The southern section is mostly flat following the river and roads, the northern section is hilly and somewhat rocky.

=== Trail route ===
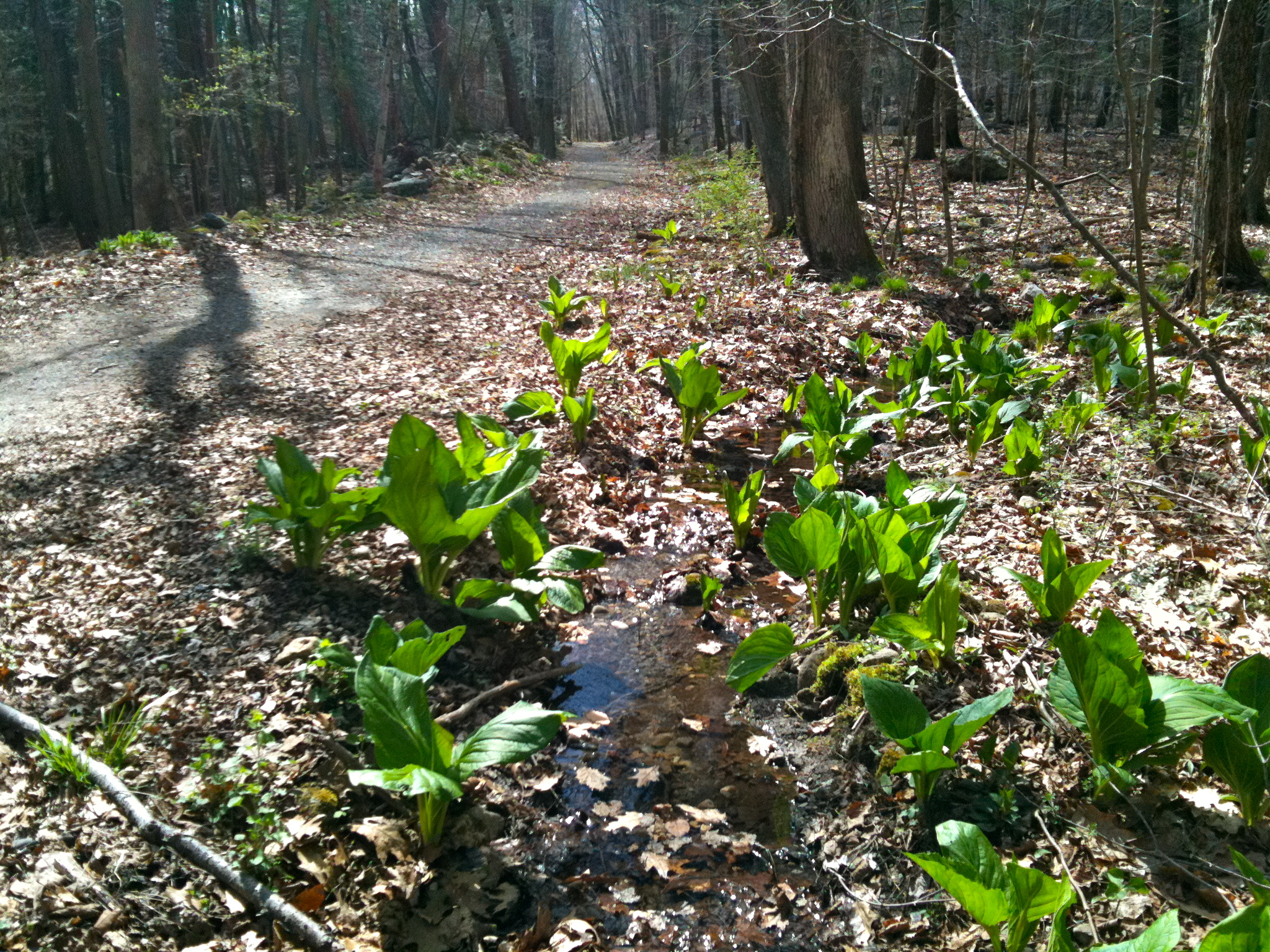
Skunk Cabbage along Poverty Hollow Road portion of Aspetuck Valley Trail in Redding, CT.

The southern terminus of the Aspetuck Valley Trail is a small parking lot on Rock House Road in Easton, Connecticut not too far west of the intersection with Valley Road.

The northern terminus occurs inside Collis P. Huntington State Park at the junction with local trails inside the park. There is a small parking area where the trail crosses Hopewell Road in Redding, Connecticut before it enters the state park. The parking lot is on the east side of Hopewell Road.

From the south heading north the trail follows the Aspetuck River and uses the unimproved Valley Road until it reaches the paved Poverty Hollow Road intersection with Stepney road. There is a dam on the river at Hedmon's Pond at the intersection. The trail diverges from the river via a short walk east on Stepney road and then the trail turns north on the dirt Foundry Road and when Foundry Road ends the trail enters the woods of the Centennial Watershed State Forest for a two-mile stretch before it rejoins both the Aspetuck River and Poverty Hollow Road. After crossing the river and road the trail continues in the state forest for another mile north before reaching the parking lot on Hopewell Road. The hiker can then cross Hopewell Road and continue on into Collis P. Huntington State Park for another 0.4 miles.

=== Trail communities ===
The official Blue-Blazed Aspetuck Valley Trail passes through land located within the municipalities of Newton, Easton and Redding, Connecticut.

== Landscape, geology, and natural environment ==
"AspetuckValleyTrailAspetuckRiver2.theora.ogv" with a still from 200 seconds

== History and folklore ==
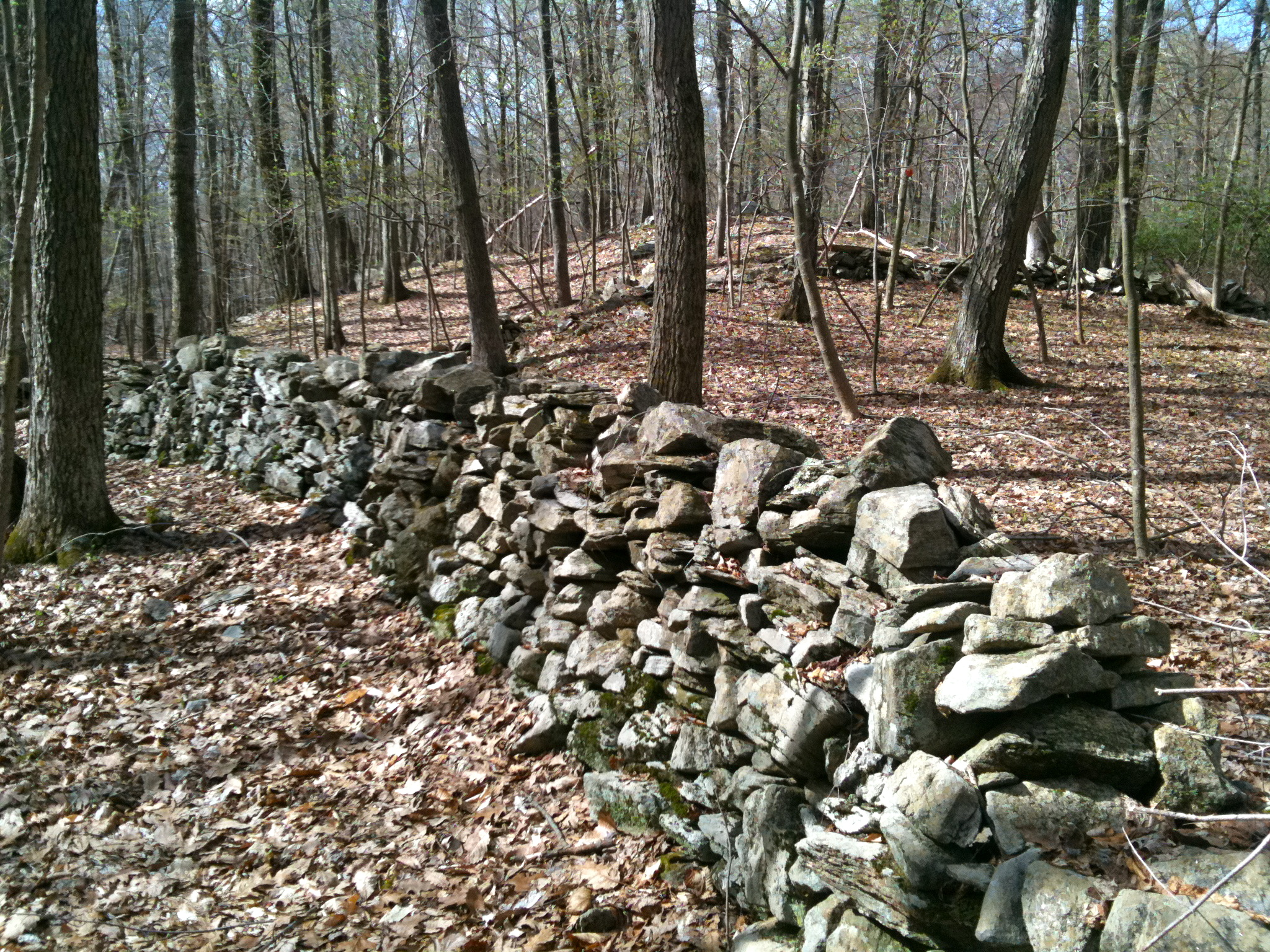
Old abandoned farm stone fence in Centennial State Forest along Aspetuck Valley Trail in Newtown, CT.

The Aspetuck Valley Blue-Blazed Trail was created by a collaboration in 2006 between Aquarion Water, the Nature Conservancy and the Connecticut Forest and Park Association.

=== Origin and name ===
Aspetuck can be translated to mean "river originating at the high place." in the Algonquin language of many Indians native to Connecticut. This translation fits as Aspetuck was and is the name of the tributary river which begins on Sunset Hill in Redding and flows southward before it joins the Saugatuck River.

Aspetuck was also the name of the native American tribe which lived along the Aspetuck River in a settlement were New Milford and Redding are today. The Aspetucks are believed to be related to the Paugussett and the name is believed to have been a name those in the Paugussett tribe's Unkowa clan.

Aspetuck has also become the unofficial name for an area in Easton and Redding near the Aspetuck River.

Paugussett is the name of an Algonquian-speaking native American tribe and sachemdom existing in southwestern Connecticut in the 17th century. Derby, Connecticut was once known as "Paugussett" before it was renamed in 1675.

Paugussett villages existed in Bridgeport, Trumbull, Stratford, Shelton, Monroe and Oxford in Fairfield County as well as in what is now Milford, Orange, Woodbridge, Beacon Falls, Derby and Naugatuck in New Haven County, Connecticut. Pootatuck (AKA Potatuck) was a village of the Paugussett where the Pootatuck River is today in Newtown.

Descendants of the southeast Fairfield County Connecticut branch of the Paugussett tribe (known as the "Golden Hill" Paugussetts) today have a reservation in Colchester Connecticut (New London County) as well as a small land holding in the Nichols section of Stratford, Connecticut.

For more information on the Paugussett native-Americans ("American Indians") see the Wikipedia entry on the Paugussett as well as the Golden Hill Paugussett website.

== Hiking the trail ==
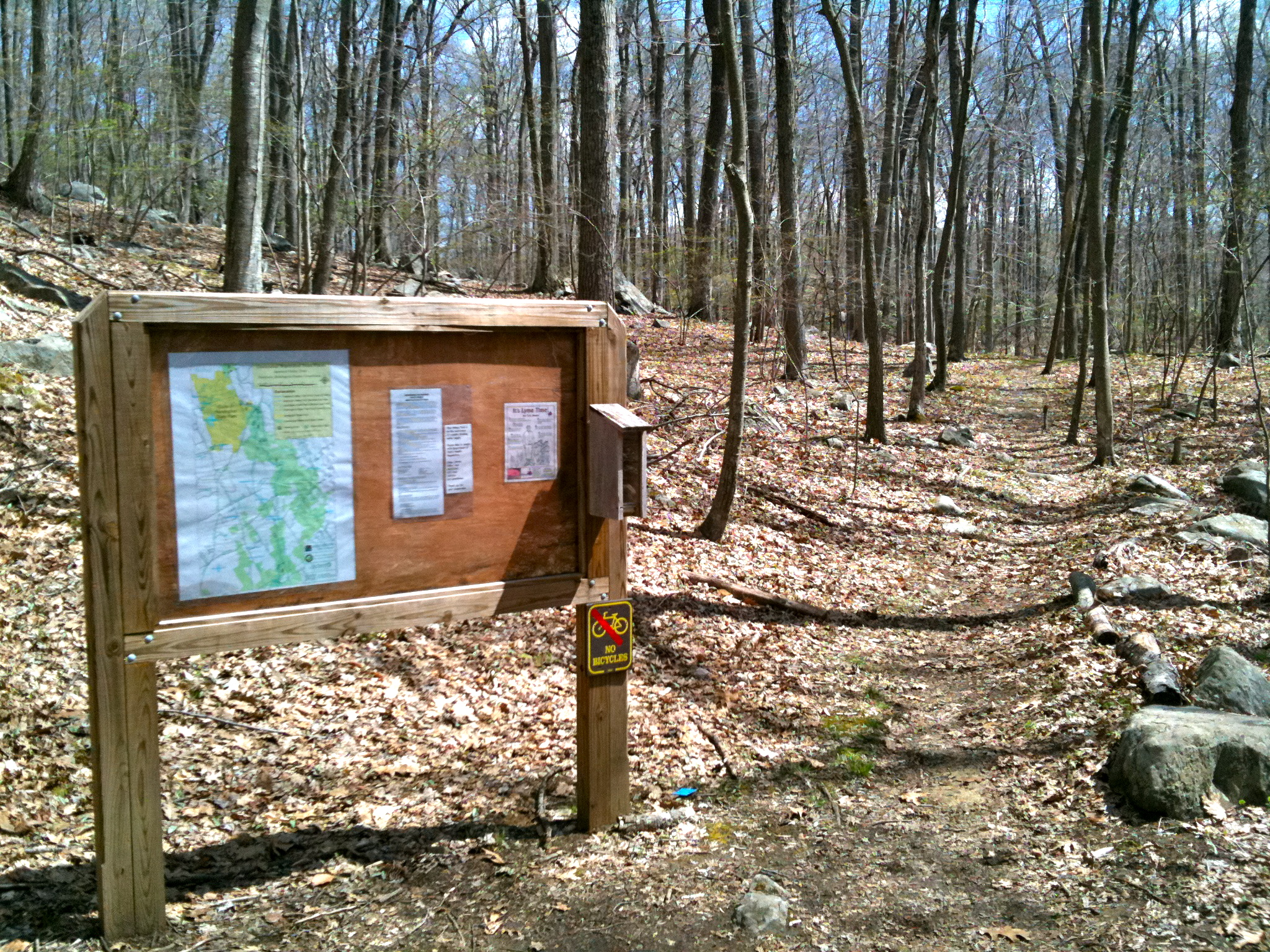
Northern Terminus of Aspetuck Valley Trail inside Collis P. Huntington State Park.

The mainline Aspetuck Valley trail is blazed with blue rectangles. It is regularly maintained, and is considered easy hiking, with very few sections of rugged and moderately difficult hiking (notably just the climb up to the northern high point near the great Oak tree).

Much of the Aspetuck Valley Trail is close to water and though some swamp areas inland are prone to flooding the trail along the lake shore is mostly on very high ground. There are no camping facilities along the trail and camping is prohibited in the Centennial Watershed State Forest. Trail descriptions are available from a number of commercial and non-commercial sources, and a complete guidebook is published by the Connecticut Forest and Park Association

Weather along the route is typical of Connecticut. This trail does not really have any exposed ridge tops or summits. Snow is common in the winter and may necessitate the use of snowshoes. Ice can form on exposed ledges and summits, making hiking dangerous without special equipment.

Extensive flooding in ponds, puddles and streams usually occurs in the late winter or early spring, overflowing into the trail and causing very muddy conditions. In this case fairly high waterproof boots are recommended. Since some parts of the trail follow forest roads, ruts and tracks from ATVs and four-wheel drive vehicles make be found.

Biting insects can be bothersome during warm weather. Parasitic deer ticks (which are known to carry Lyme disease) are a potential hazard.

Only the trail heads and the middle of the trail are close to (rural) civilization (and are on paved roads). There two very short dirt road walks — along Stepney and Foundry Roads.

Almost all of the trail is adjacent to, or is on lands where hunting and the use of firearms are permitted. Wearing bright orange clothing during the hunting season (Fall through December) is recommended.

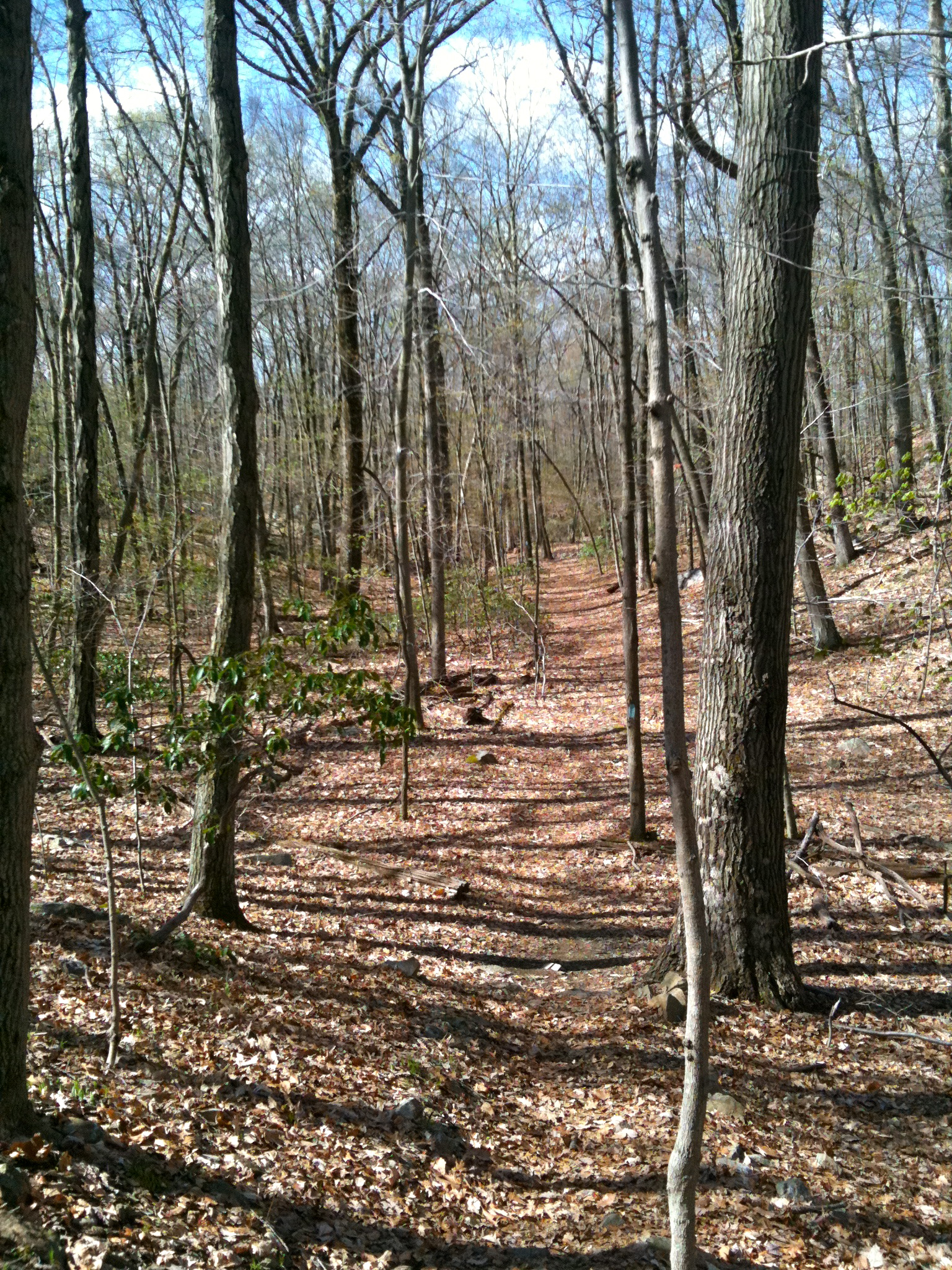
Aspetuck Valley Trail path through woods near Towne End Road in Newtown, CT.

As of April 2010 the Centennial Watershed State Forest "Seedling Series" letterbox has been out of commission although the State of Connecticut's Department of Environmental Protection Forestry Division has said that it will be made available again.

== See also ==
- Blue-Blazed Trails
- Aspetuck River
- Aspetuck, Connecticut
- Easton, Connecticut
- Newtown, Connecticut
- Redding, Connecticut
- History of Newtown, Connecticut
