= List of land trusts in Connecticut =

This is a list of major land trusts in the state of Connecticut.

Name	Headquarters	County	Scope	Summary
Aspetuck Land Trust	Westport	Fairfield	Regional	website
Avalonia Land Conservancy	Old Mystic	New London	Regional	website
Avon Land Trust	Avon	Hartford	Single Town	website
Branford Land Trust	Branford	New Haven	Single Town	website
Flanders Nature Center & Land Trust	Woodbury	Litchfield	Regional	website
Great Meadows Conservation Trust	Glastonbury	Hartford	Regional	website
Greenwich Land Trust	Greenwich	Fairfield	Single Town	website
Hamden Land Conservation Trust	Hamden	New Haven	Single Town	website
Joshua's Trust	Mansfield	Tolland	Regional	website
Kongscut Land Trust, Inc.	Glastonbury	Hartford	Regional	website
Middlesex Land Trust	Middletown	Middlesex	Regional	website
New Canaan Land Trust	New Canaan	Fairfield		Website
Northern Connecticut Land Trust	Somers	Tolland		website
Northwest Connecticut Land Conservancy	Kent	Litchfield	Regional	website
Roxbury Land Trust	Roxbury	Litchfield		website, includes Mine Hills Preserve
Waterford Land Trust	Waterford	New London		website
Wintonbury Land Trust	Bloomfield	Hartford	Regional	website
Wolf Den Land Trust		Windham		website
Wyndham Land Trust	Pomfret Center	Windham		website

== See also ==
- List of nature centers in Connecticut
- Connecticut Forest and Park Association
