= Aspetuck Reservoir =

- Location within Connecticut
- Location: Fairfield County, Connecticut
- Coordinates: 41°14′18″N 73°19′09″W
- Type: reservoir
- Primary inflows: Aspetuck River
- Primary outflows: Aspetuck River
- Surface elevation: 69 m (226 ft)

Interactive map of the Aspetuck Reservoir

The Aspetuck Reservoir is a large body of water in Fairfield County, Connecticut. It is formed on the Aspetuck River. All of the Aspetuck River Watershed in Redding, the easternmost quadrant of the Town, drains south to the Aspetuck Reservoir in Easton and Fairfield.
