= Trout Brook Valley State Park Reserve =

State park in Connecticut, United States

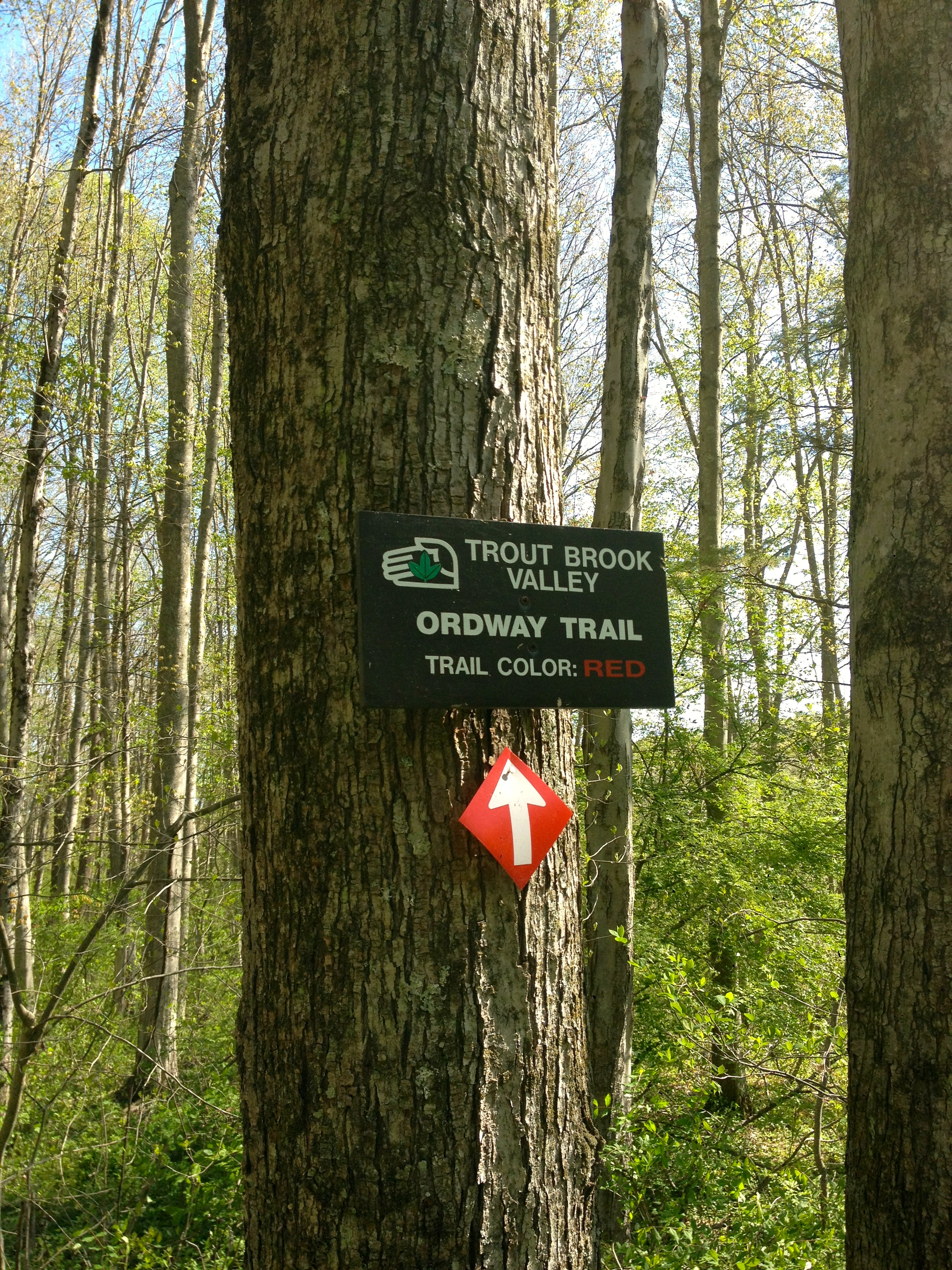
- Trout Brook Valley Preserve and Connecticut State Reserve, Ordway (Red-Blazed) Trail southern trailhead (north of Bradley Hill Road) entrance.

- Location within Connecticut Location within the United States
- Location: Easton, Connecticut, United States
- Coordinates: 41°14′44″N 73°20′33″W
- Area: 300 acres (120 ha)
- Established: 1999
- Administrator: Connecticut Department of Energy and Environmental Protection
- Designation: Connecticut state park
- Website: Official website

Trout Brook Valley State Park Reserve is a 300-acre (120 ha) parcel owned by the state of Connecticut that is part of the larger Trout Brook Valley Preserve (also known as the Trout Brook Valley Conservation Area), located in Easton, Connecticut. The full conservation area covers 1,009 acres (408 ha) and comprises several contiguous parcels in the towns of Easton and Weston, bordering the southeast corner of the Saugatuck Reservoir. It is managed by the Aspetuck Land Trust. The state park portion of the preserve offers opportunities for hiking and hunting.

== History ==
In 1994, the Bridgeport Hydraulic Company (BHC) began to entertain the notion of selling the 730 acres of undeveloped property it owned which bordered the southeast corner of the Saugatuck Reservoir. In 1997, BHC's parent company, Aquarion, BHC and a developer signed a contract to develop 103 luxury residences and a golf course on the property. In 1998, the Aspetuck Land Trust and the Coalition to Preserve Trout Brook Valley spearheaded an initiative to save the parcel from development. They were joined in the effort by Connecticut Fund for the Environment, Citizens for Easton, the Easton garden club, hiking and mountain biking groups, birding enthusiasts, naturalists and others including actor/philanthropist Paul Newman and his family. In September 1999, 685 acres of the Trout Brook Valley land were purchased from BHC/Aquarion with $5.3 million raised by the Aspetuck Land Trust and the Nature Conservancy and $6 million from the state of Connecticut. Forty-five acres in neighboring Weston were purchased by the municipal government.
