= Mill River (Fairfield, Connecticut) =

River in Fairfield, Connecticut

Coordinates: 41°09′55″N 73°16′14″W

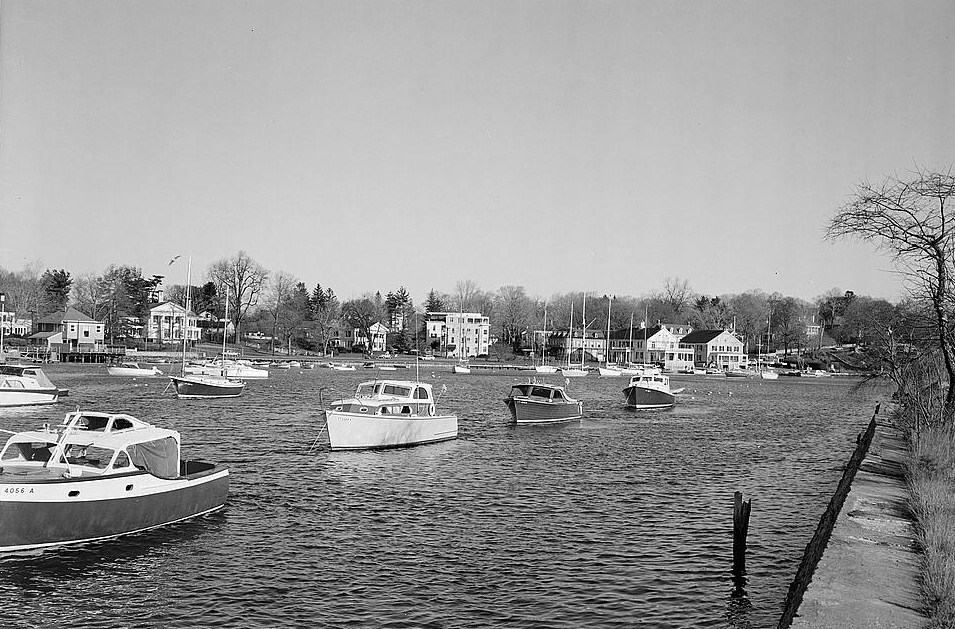
Mill River at Southport Harbor - Fairfield County, Connecticut

The Mill River is a 16.3-mile (26.2 km) river in the town of Fairfield, Connecticut. It flows into Long Island Sound at Southport harbor.

Dams on the Mill River form the Easton Reservoir, Hemlock, and Samp Mortar Lake Reservoirs and control downstream flow.

== See also ==
- List of rivers of Connecticut
