= Saugatuck Reservoir =

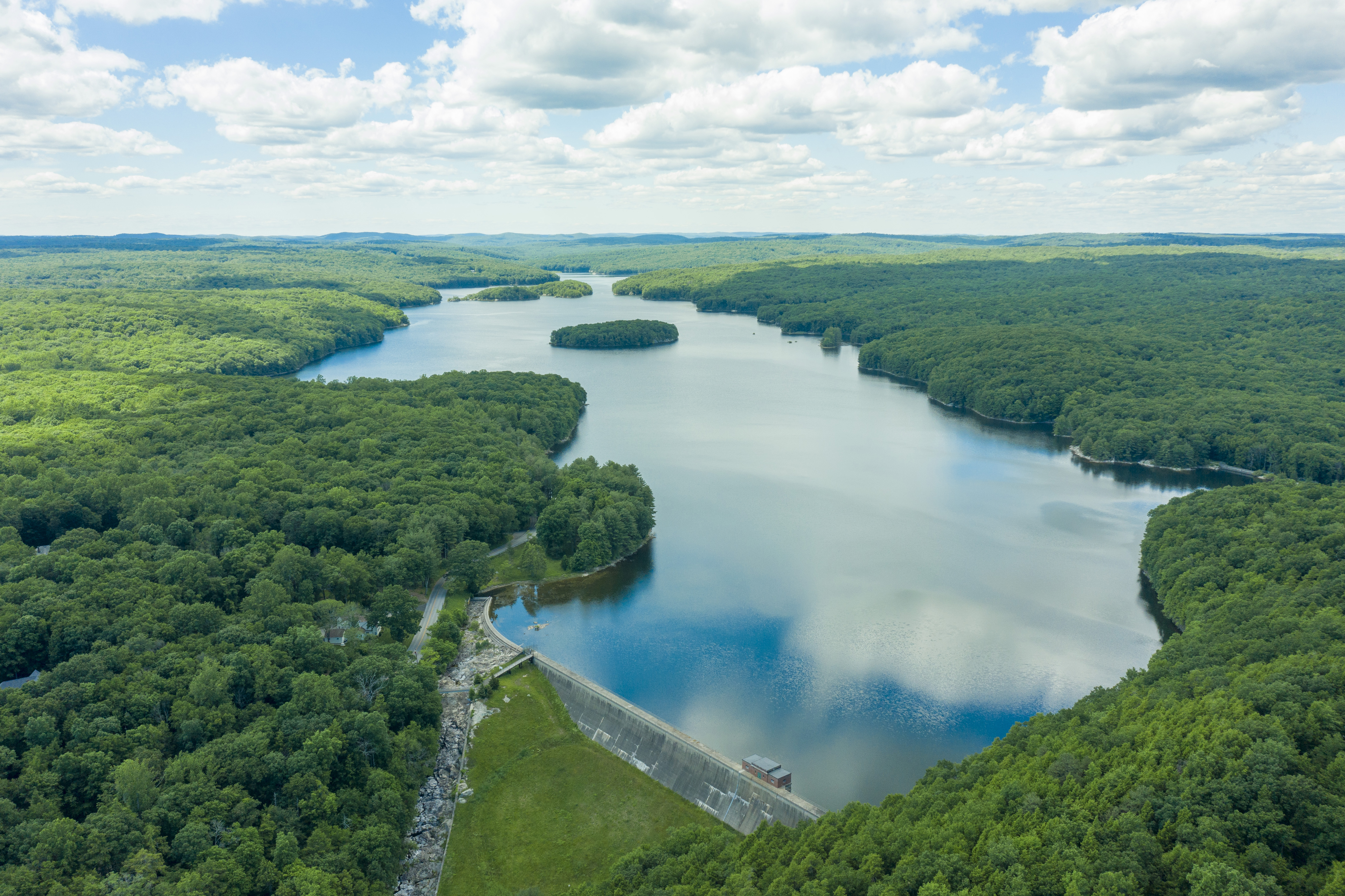

- Location within Connecticut Location within the United States
- Location: Fairfield County, Connecticut, United States
- Coordinates: 41°15′54″N 73°21′54″W
- Type: reservoir
- Primary inflows: Saugatuck River
- Primary outflows: Saugatuck River
- Catchment area: 35 square miles (91 km^{2})
- Basin countries: United States
- Surface area: 827 acres (3.35 km^{2})
- Average depth: average 45 feet (14 m)
- Max. depth: 110 feet (34 m)
- Water volume: 37,215 acre-feet (45,904,000 m^{3})
- Shore length^{1}: 13 miles (21 km)
- Surface elevation: 279 ft (85 m)
- ^{1} Shore length is not a well-defined measure.

Interactive map of the Saugatuck Reservoir

The Saugatuck Reservoir is a reservoir in Fairfield County, Connecticut, United States, that straddles the border between the towns of Redding, Weston, and Easton. Its completion is marked by the creation of the Samuel P. Senior dam of the Saugatuck River in January 1942, and provides water to several of the nearby towns. The reservoir is surrounded by the Centennial Watershed State Forest and a small section of the Trout Brook Valley State Park Reserve on the southeast end of the reservoir. The Saugatuck Reservoir utilizes an uncontrolled spillway adjacent to the Samuel P. Senior dam that effectively limits the maximum water level. There is also a concrete levee positioned on the southeastern side of the reservoir that prevents water from flooding Trout Brook Valley.

Bridgeport Hydraulic Company Holdings (now owned by Aquarion) flooded the Saugatuck River Valley after 1938, removing the villages of Hull and Valley Forge to create the Saugatuck Reservoir.

Aquarion Water Co., owner of the reservoir and dam, allows tailrace fishing in one area at the Weston end of the reservoir, where it has constructed a handicapped-access area. However, anglers must obtain a permit from Aquarion before fishing in the Saugatuck.

The Saugatuck is the largest of the eight reservoirs that make up Aquarion’s greater Bridgeport water system. It holds about 12 billion US gallons (45,000,000 m^{3}) of water.

The following fish species may be found within the Saugatuck Reservoir:

American eel
Bluegill (Sunfish)
Brook trout
Brown trout
Bullhead catfish
Chain pickerel
Crappie
Largemouth bass
Pumpkinseed (Sunfish)
Rainbow trout
Rock bass
Smallmouth bass
Walleye
White perch
Yellow perch
