= Branford Land Trust =

US non-profit organization

The Branford Land Trust is a non-profit organization that purchases land to make it non-developable, protected land through land trusts.

Founded in 1967, the trust aims to protect Branford's natural resources through:

- Acquiring and managing open space
- Promoting education about natural resources, and
- Encouraging community involvement

The trust owns nearly 775 acres (3.14 km^{2}) in over 130 parcels in Branford, Connecticut, U.S., on the shore of Long Island Sound, just east of New Haven. It has worked for the acquisition of several large, publicly owned tracts, including the Short Beach Preserve, a 40-acre (160,000 m^{2}) parcel of land with rugged rock outcroppings, tall oaks, beeches, groves of mountain laurel, wetlands and a bluff offering views of Talmadge Pond and the Long Island Sound.

In 2002, the Land Trust was awarded the Branford Chamber of Commerce Community Advancement Award, which "recognizes the sustained efforts of an individual organization or company for their efforts towards helping to make Branford a better place to work and live."

== See also ==
- List of land trusts in Connecticut
