= Agnes Millen Richmond =

American Impressionist painter

Agnes Millen Richmond (1870–1964) was an American Impressionist painter based primarily in New York City, New York. Her body of work consists primarily of oil paintings of confrontational, confident women, as well as a few landscapes and paintings of other subjects.

== Personal life ==
Richmond was born in 1870 in Alton, Illinois, where she stayed until attending the St. Louis School of Fine Arts. In 1888, Richmond moved to East Midtown Manhattan to attend classes at the Art Students League of New York. While in New York, she married Winthrop Turney, a watercolor painter and muralist for the Works Progress Administration. The date of their marriage is unclear, but was between 1888 and 1918, based on Richmond's move to New York City in 1888 and the summers they spent together in Gloucester, MA, recorded earliest in 1918. The couple also often summered in Mountainville, NY, and many of Richmond's paintings explore the settings of Mountainville and Gloucester. In 1924, Richmond moved to Brooklyn, where she lived until she died in 1964.

== Education and career ==
Before moving to New York City in 1888, Richmond was first introduced to an education in the arts at the St. Louis School of Fine Arts. After moving to New York City, Richmond began to take classes at the Art Students' League of New York, where she studied with American Impressionist masters John Henry Twachtman in 1901, and Walter Appleton Clark and Kenyon Cox in 1902 and 1903. During this time and until 1914, Richmond was also actively teaching herself the skills that would culminate in her confident draftsmanship, accompanied by a balanced palette of intense hues and subdued earth tones. From 1910 to 1914, Richmond taught at the Art Students League while she began to garner national attention. In 1911, she won the Watrous Figure Prize, and throughout the next few decades would be featured in both group and solo exhibitions.

Throughout her life, Richmond summered in various locales, primarily Mountainville, NY and Gloucester, MA. Her paintings often reflect these sceneries. In Gloucester, Richmond joined a group of artists in the so-called "Red Cottage," where artists of various backgrounds and skills gathered for a few summers between 1914 and 1919. While the cottage was owned by artists John and Dolly Sloan, the artists that summered there included Charles and Alice Winter, sculptor Helen Davis, Agnes M. Richmond, Paul Cornoyer, Randall Davey, Leon Kroll, F. Carl Smith, and music composer Paul Tietjens. She was also affiliated with the Allied Artists of America, the National Association of Women Artists, the Brooklyn Society of Artists, and the American Artists Professional League.

== Exhibitions ==
- Pennsylvania Academy of Fine Arts in 1912, 1920s, 1937
- Corcoran Biennials in 1914 and 1919
- Pan-Pacific Exposition in San Francisco in 1915
- National Association of Women Artists
- Sesqui-Centennial International Exposition in Philadelphia in 1926
- Brooklyn Society of Artists
- Solo exhibition at the Fifteen Gallery in 1939
- Society of Independent Artists
- Art Institute of Chicago
- Carnegie Institute's International Exhibitions
- Salons of America
- Regional exhibitions in New Rochelle, NY, Montreal, Toronto, NC, San Diego
- Jeffrey Alan Gallery in New York in 1981
- Currently in the collections of San Diego Fine Arts Society, Georgia Museum of Art, Hickory (NC) Museum of Art
