= Flanders Nature Center & Land Trust =

- Interactive map of Flanders Nature Center & Land Trust
- Type: Nature center and land trust
- Location: 5 Church Hill Road; Woodbury, CT, USA
- Coordinates: 41°14′51″N 73°28′25″W
- Area: 179 acres (72 ha)
- Created: 1963
- Website: flandersnaturecenter.org

Flanders Nature Center & Land Trust is a non-profit nature center and land trust located at 5 Church Hill Road in Woodbury, Connecticut. Established in 1963, the organization holds in trust over 2,100 acres of space in seven preserves in Woodbury, Bethlehem, Southbury and Middlebury.

The center offers classes in nature, art, summer camps, after-school and other programs for adults, children and school groups.

== Reserves ==
- Van Vleck Farm and Nature Sanctuary, Woodbury, teaching campus with a farmhouse, studio, trail house, sugar house and barns
- Whittemore Sanctuary, 686 acres, Woodbury
- Manville Kettle, 6.5 acres, Woodbury
- Hetzel Refuge, 54 acres, Middlebury
- Fredrick W. Marzahl Memorial Refuge
- Leavenworth Preserve, 126 acres, Woodbury
- Fleming Preserve, 28.5 acres, Woodbury

== See also ==
- List of land trusts in Connecticut
