= Aspetuck Land Trust =

American non-profit organization

- Founded: August 7, 1967
- Founder: Barlow Cutler Wotton
- Location: Aspetuck Land Trust, PO Box 444, Westport, CT 06881
- Key people: Paul Newman
- Website: AspetuckLandTrust.org

The Aspetuck Land Trust is a nonprofit organization founded in 1967 that seeks to preserve open spaces in the towns of Westport, Fairfield, Weston and Easton in Fairfield County, Connecticut. In 2011 it was reported that the trust covered an area of 1,700 acres over 43 sites which include public trails.

== History ==
In 2011 Joan duPont donated 34 acres owned since 1982.

In 2011 the trust acquired the Trout Brook Valley lands in Easton. Paul Newman is recognized as responsible for lobbying the Connecticut governor for assisting with the funds for the purchase. Part of this land is a state park known as Trout Brook Valley State Park Reserve.

== Reception ==
In 2010 it was reported that the trust had preserved hiking trails arounds the Saugatuck river.

== Protected areas ==
=== Lee's Canal Wetlands Habitat, Westport ===
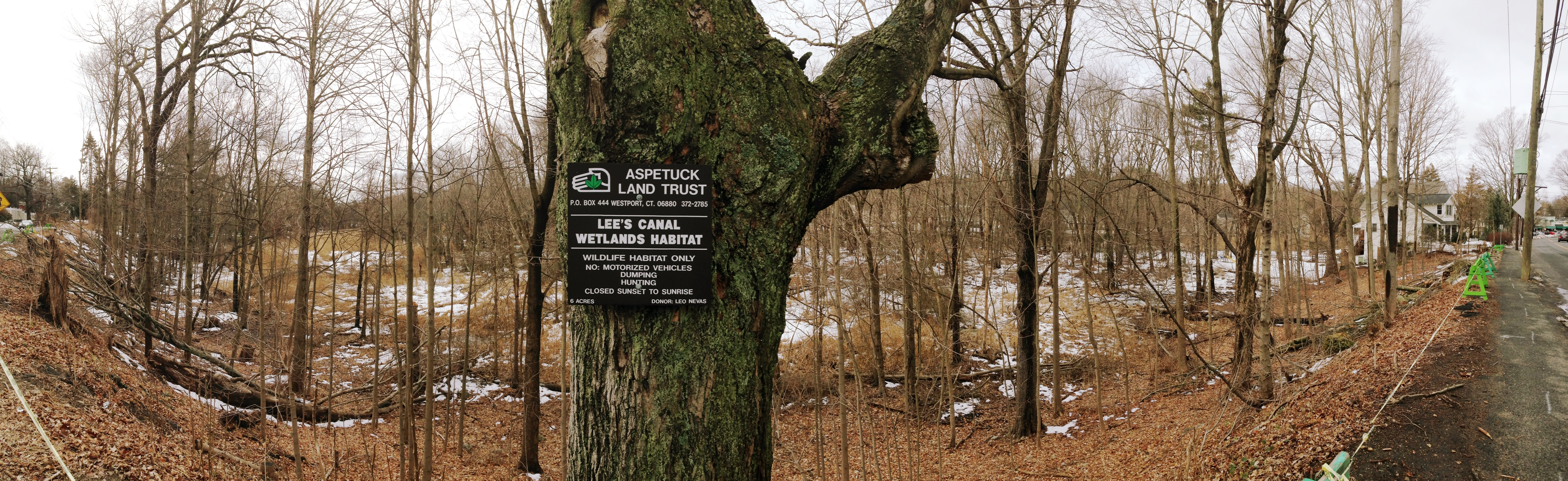

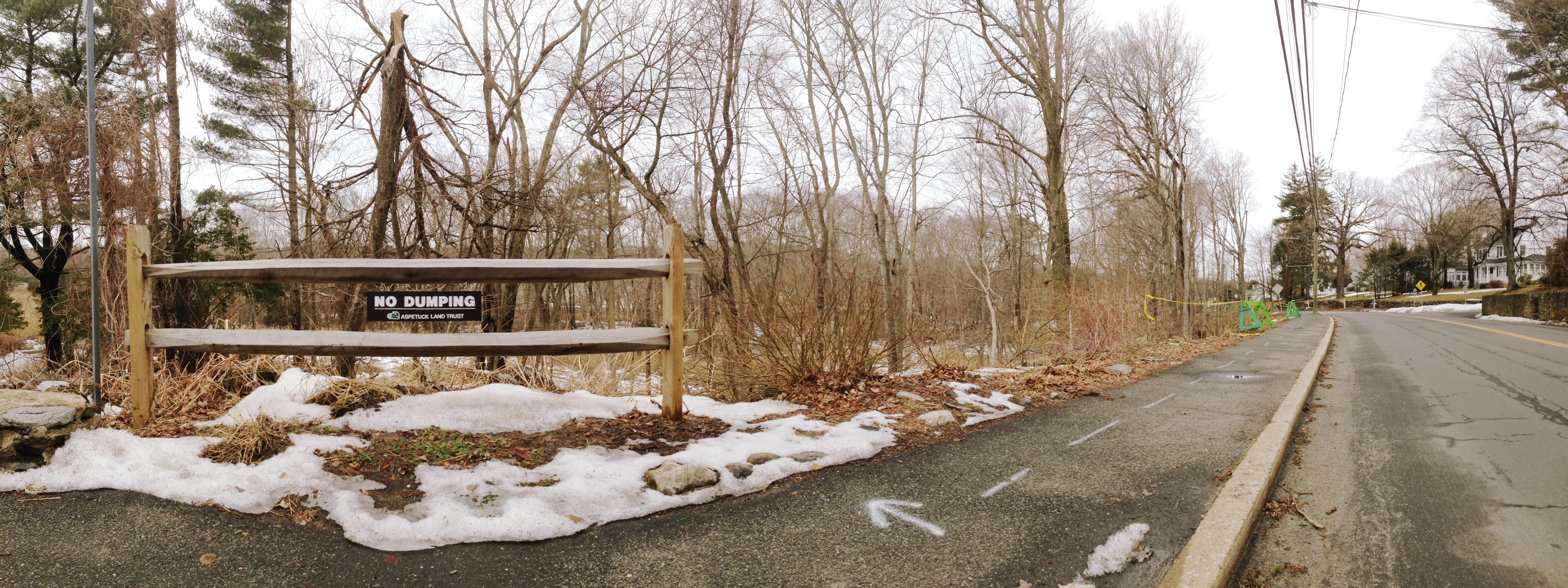

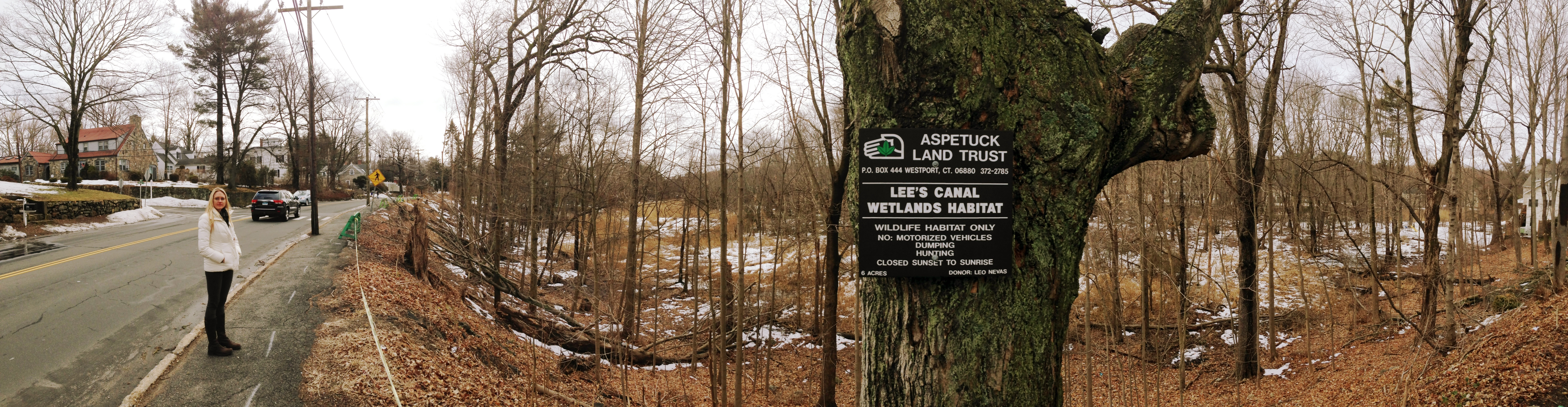

=== Newman Poses Nature Preserve, Westport ===
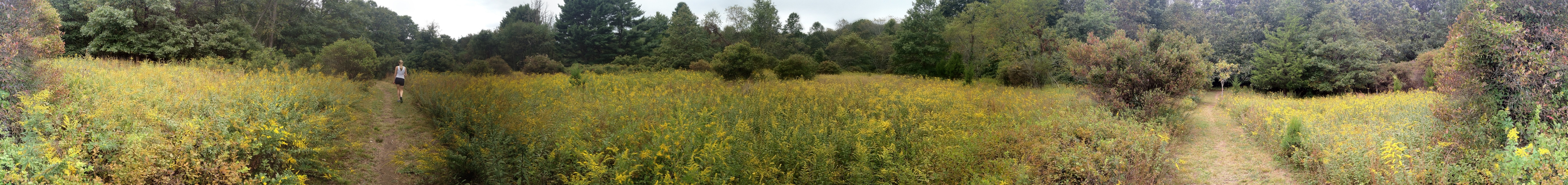

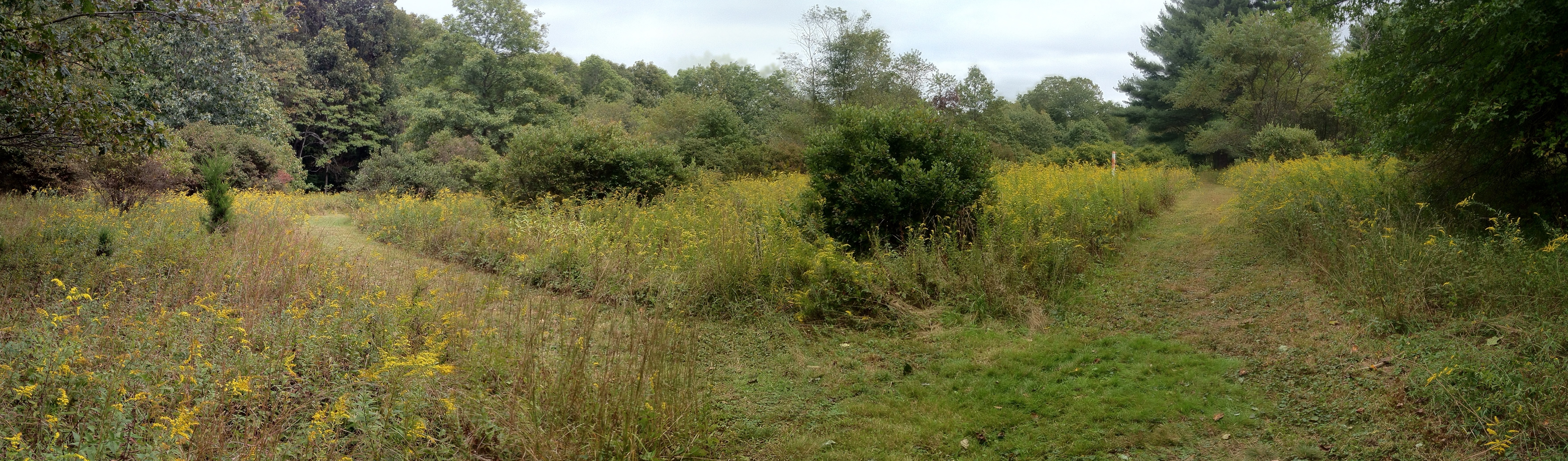

=== Taylortown Salt Marsh, Westport ===
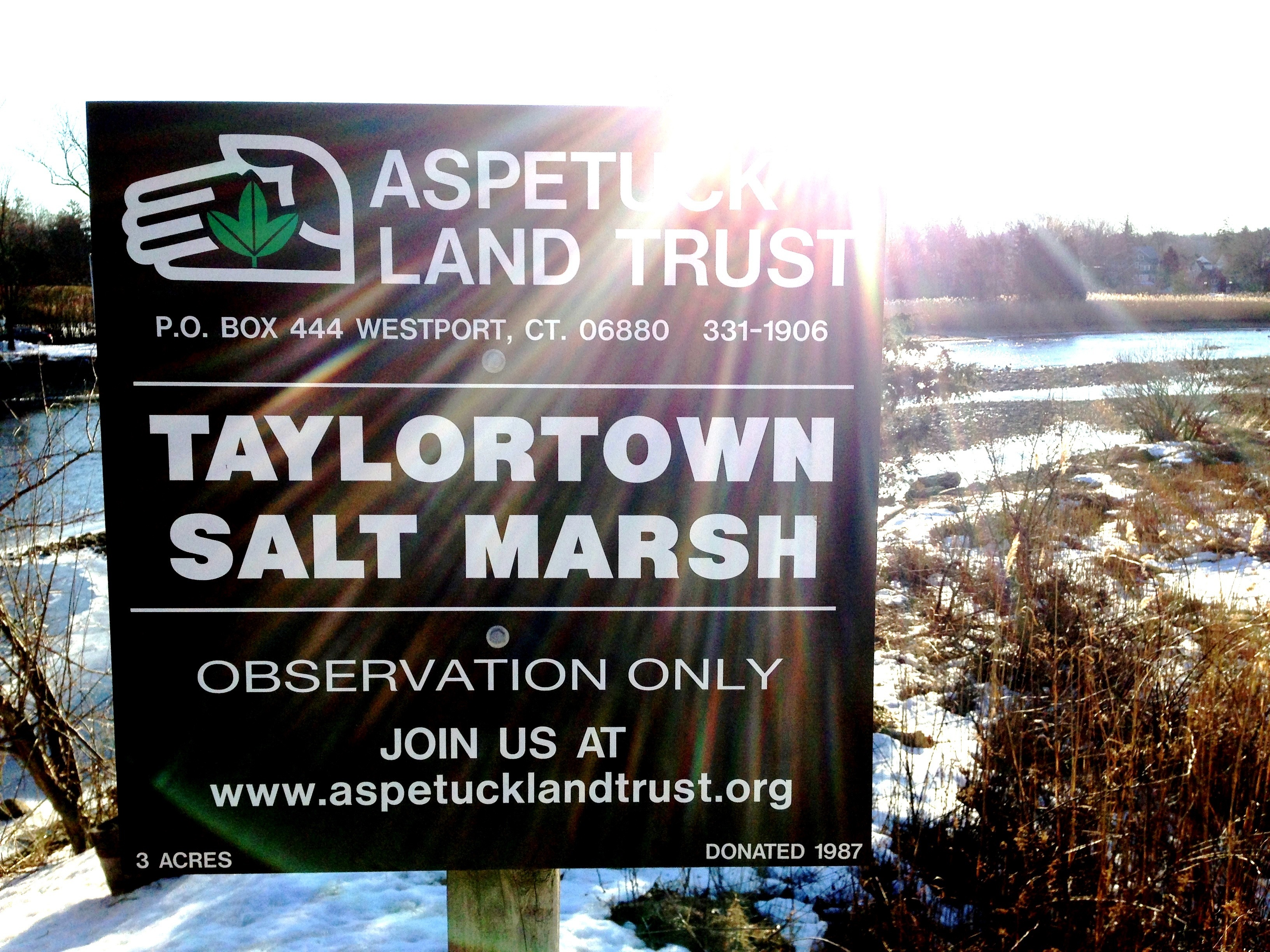

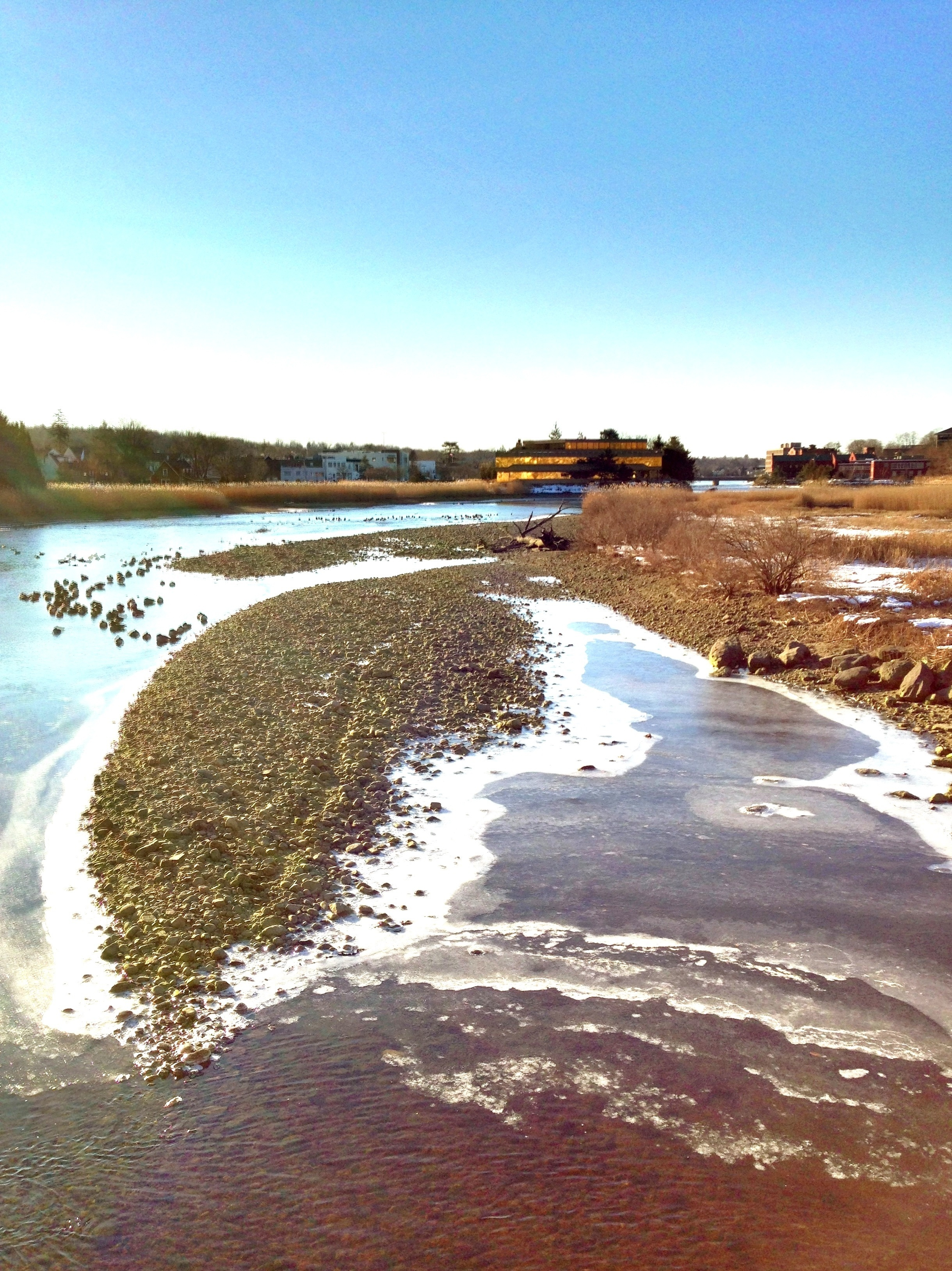

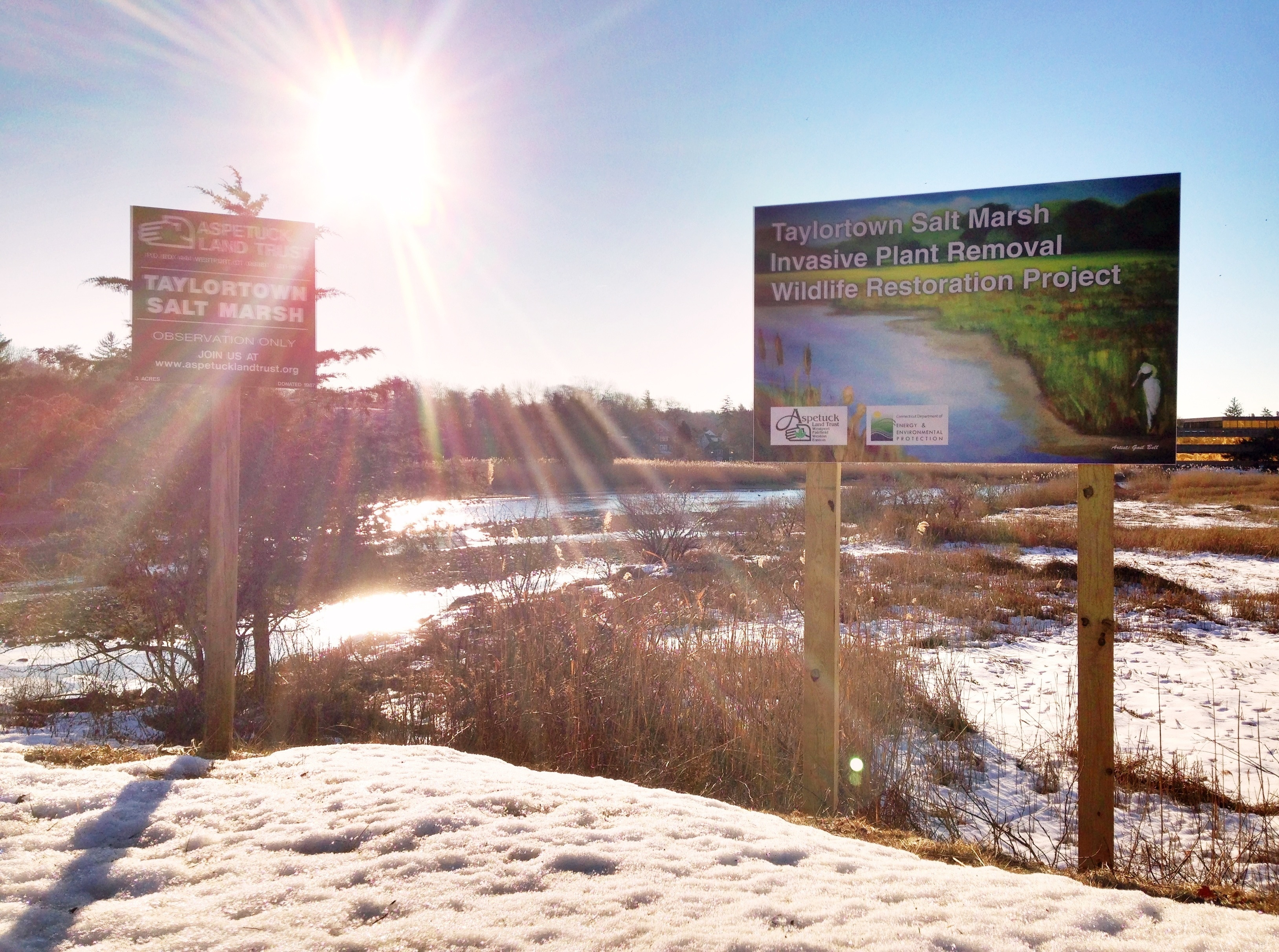

=== Trout Brook Valley Preserve, Easton ===
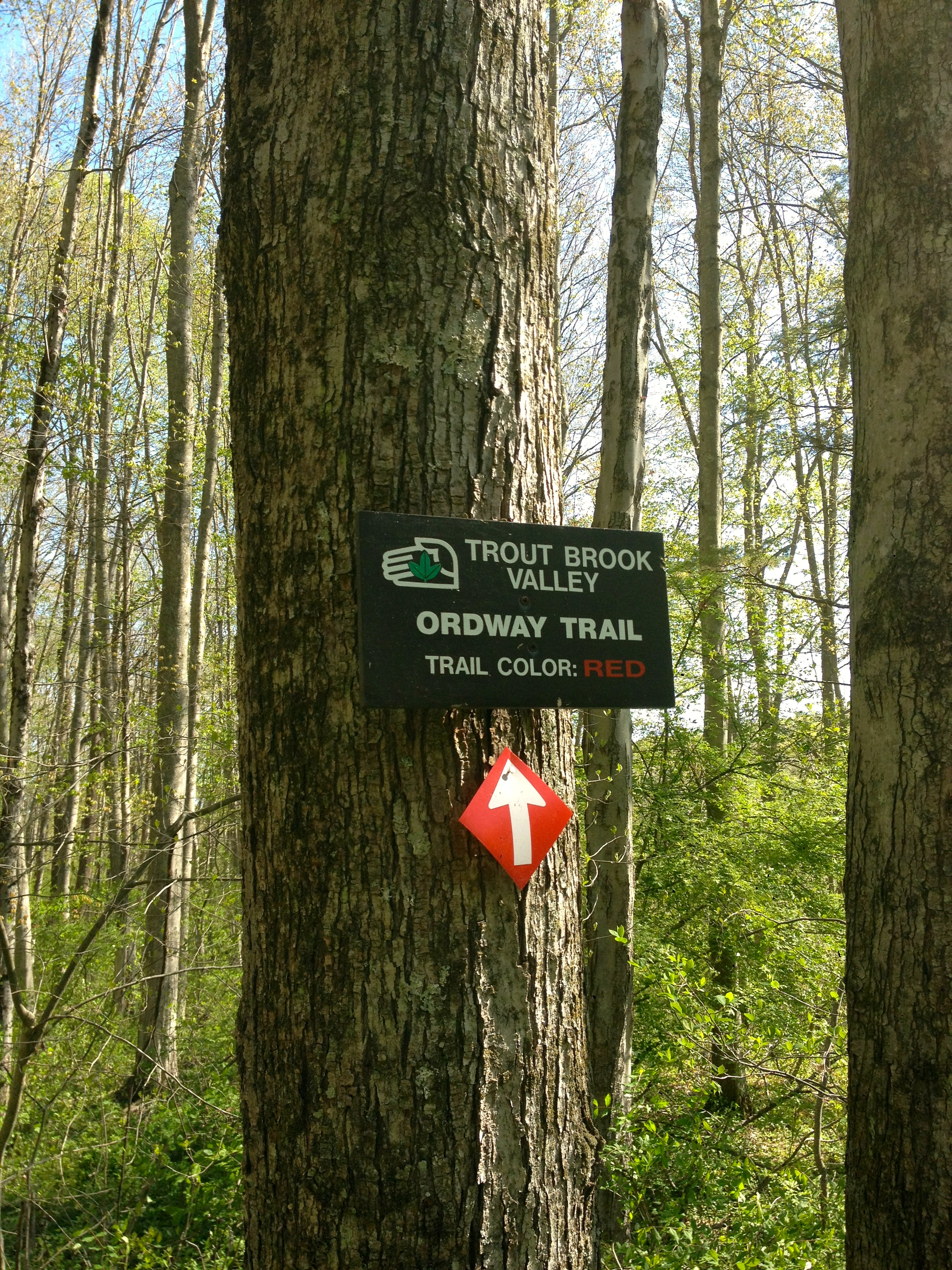
Trout Brook Valley Preserve and Connecticut State Reserve, Ordway (Red-Blazed) Trail Southern Trailhead (north of Bradley Hill Road entrance)

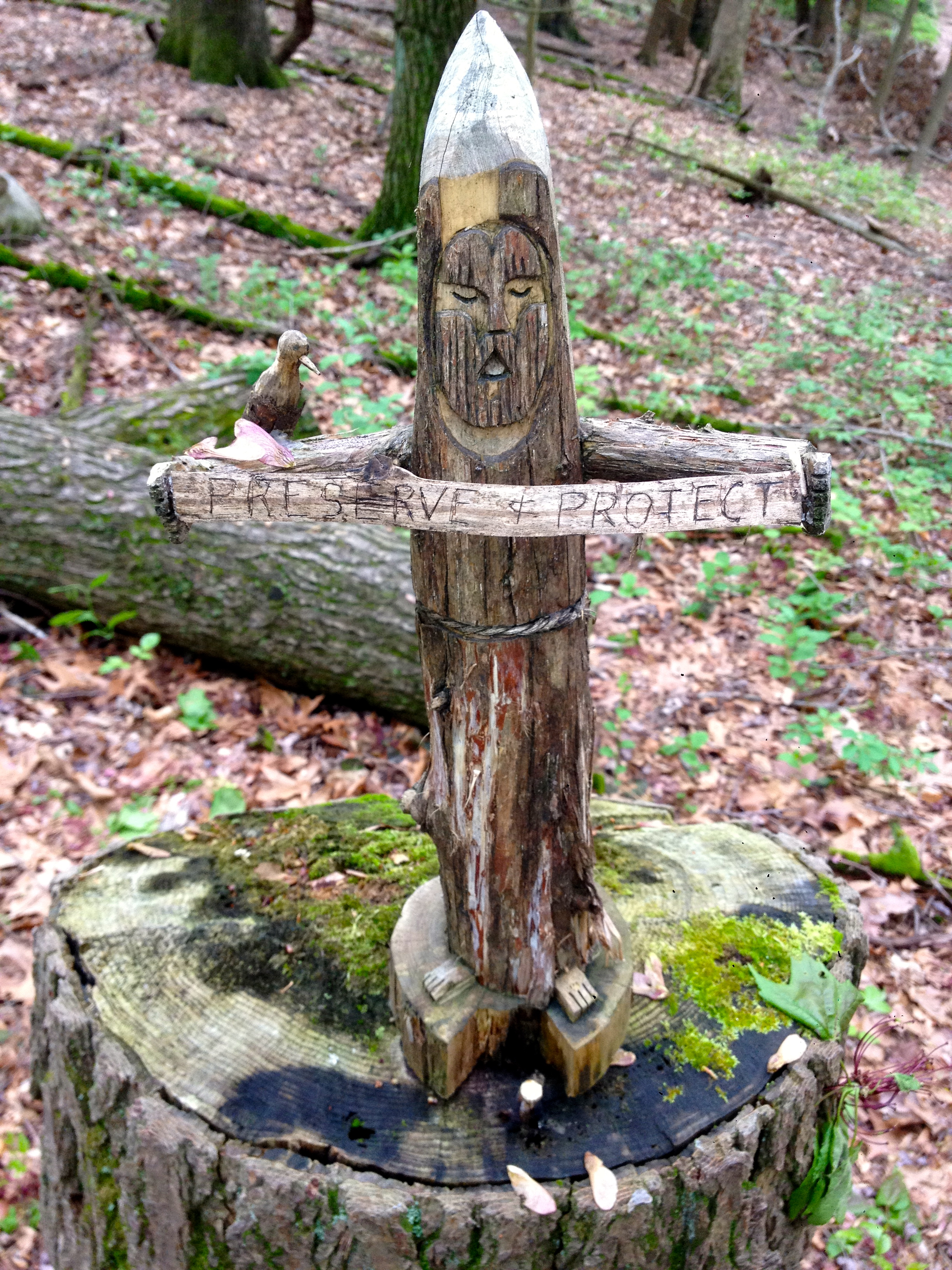
Rustic Carved Wood Statue in Trout Brook Valley Preserve north of Elm Drive parking lot alongside the Blue Trail

== See also ==
- List of land trusts in Connecticut
