= Centennial Watershed State Forest =

State forest in Connecticut, United States

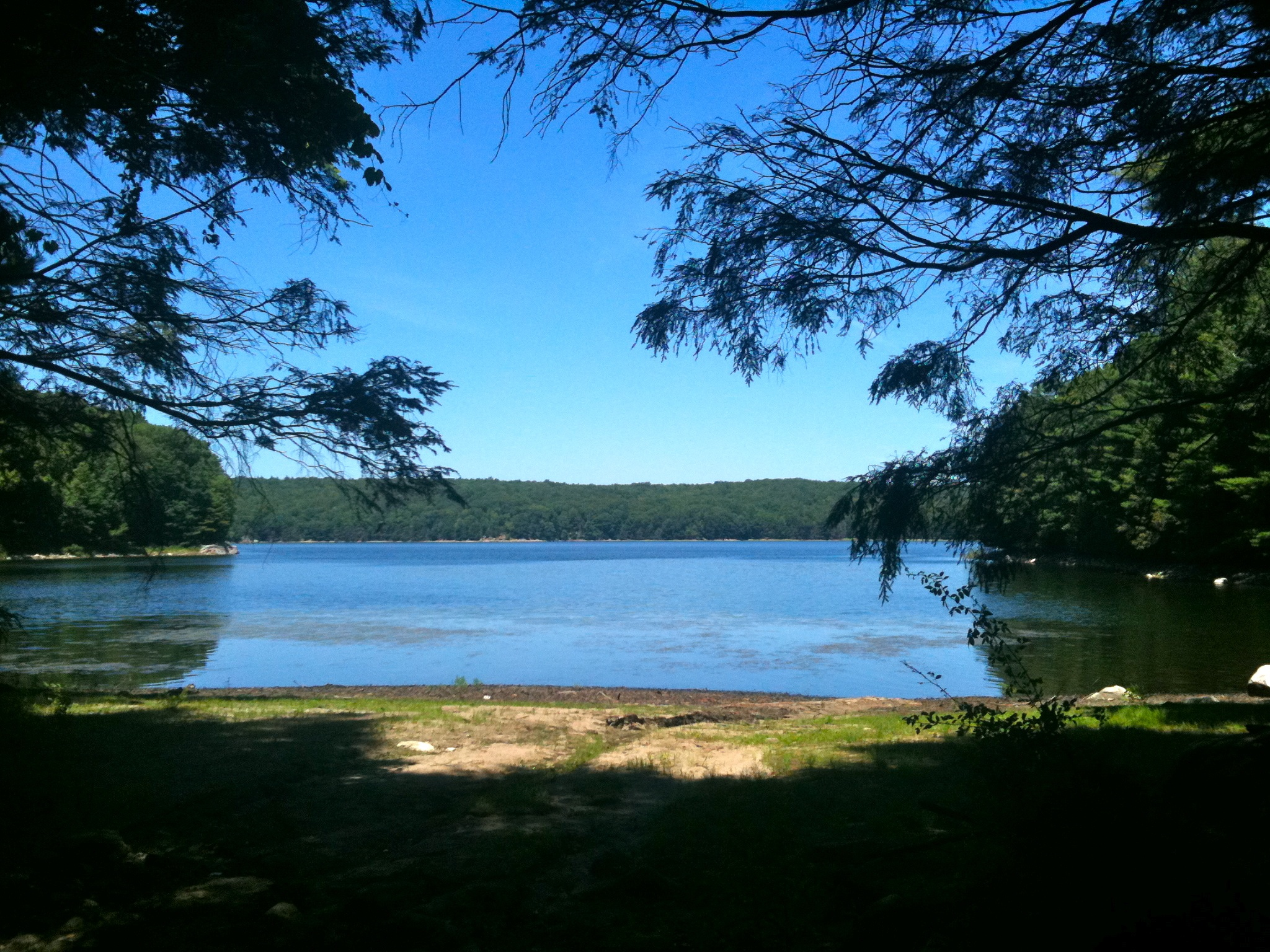
- Saugatuck Reservoir from the Saugatuck Trail in Centennial Watershed State Forest.

- Location within Connecticut Location within the United States
- Location: Fairfield County, Connecticut, United States
- Coordinates: 41°16′02″N 73°22′00″W
- Area: 15,370 acres (6,220 ha)
- Elevation: 282 ft (86 m)
- Established: 2002
- Administrator: Connecticut Department of Energy and Environmental Protection, The Nature Conservancy, Aquarion Water Company
- Website: Official website

Centennial Watershed State Forest is a highly fragmented Connecticut state forest of more than 15,000 acres. Its larger parcels or fragments are in the towns of Easton, Newtown, Redding, and Weston. Dozens of other, disconnected properties -- often merely a few acres -- are strung throughout much of suburban, southwest Connecticut. In 2002, the lands were acquired from the Aquarion Water Company by the state in partnership with The Nature Conservancy. Those three entities continue to manage the property by committee. The forest was named in honor of the hundredth anniversary of the state forest system.

== Recreation opportunities ==
Most of the state forest acreage is off limits to the public and patrolled by Aquarion security officers. In limited areas, the state permits certain recreation including hiking on the Aspetuck Valley Trail and Saugatuck Trail, and shoreline fishing on the Saugatuck Reservoir. Public access to limited parts of the forest requires a special state permit.
