= Walter Luttgen =

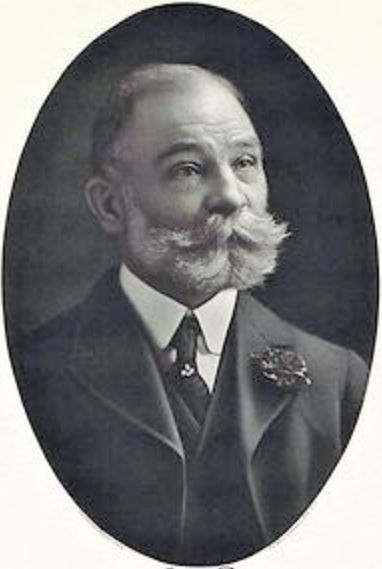
- Luttgen, c. 1917
- Born: Walther Lüttgen; January 19, 1839; Solingen, Kingdom of Prussia (now Germany)
- Died: February 27, 1922 (aged 83); New York City, New York, U.S.
- Occupations: Banker, industrialist and yachtsman
- Spouse: Amelia Victoria Bremeyer (m. 1866)
- Children: 2

Walter Luttgen (né Walther Lüttgen; January 9, 1839 - February 27, 1922) was a German-born American industrialist, banker and yachtsman who was based in New York City.

== Early life and education ==
Walter Luttgen was born January 9, 1839, in Solingen, Kingdom of Prussia to Carl August and Anne Johanne Luttgen (née Struller). The family emigrated to New York City in 1854.

== Career ==
In 1859, Luttgen was hired as office boy at the international banking company August Belmont & Company in New York, where he climbed up the ranks and became partner in 1880. He held this position until his death in 1922. Additionally he was appointed director of the Illinois Central Railway Company, Transatlantic Trust Company and the Rapid Transit Construction Company. He served as the Commodore of the Columbia Yacht Club, was a member of the New York Yacht Club, Metropolitan Museum of Art, Downtown Association, American Museum of Natural History and The Legal Aid Society.

== Personal life ==
In 1866, Luttgen married Amelia Victoria Bremeyer (1846-1928), who was born in Brooklyn to an English-born father, likely of German origin and an Irish-born mother. They had two daughters;

- Florence Amelia Luttgen (March 8, 1867 - 1 May 1927)
- Gertrude Marion Luttgen (March 6, 1880 - 9 April 1908)
