= Mine Hills Preserve =

Archaeological site in Connecticut, United States

- Roxbury Iron Mine and Furnace Complex
- U.S. National Register of Historic Places
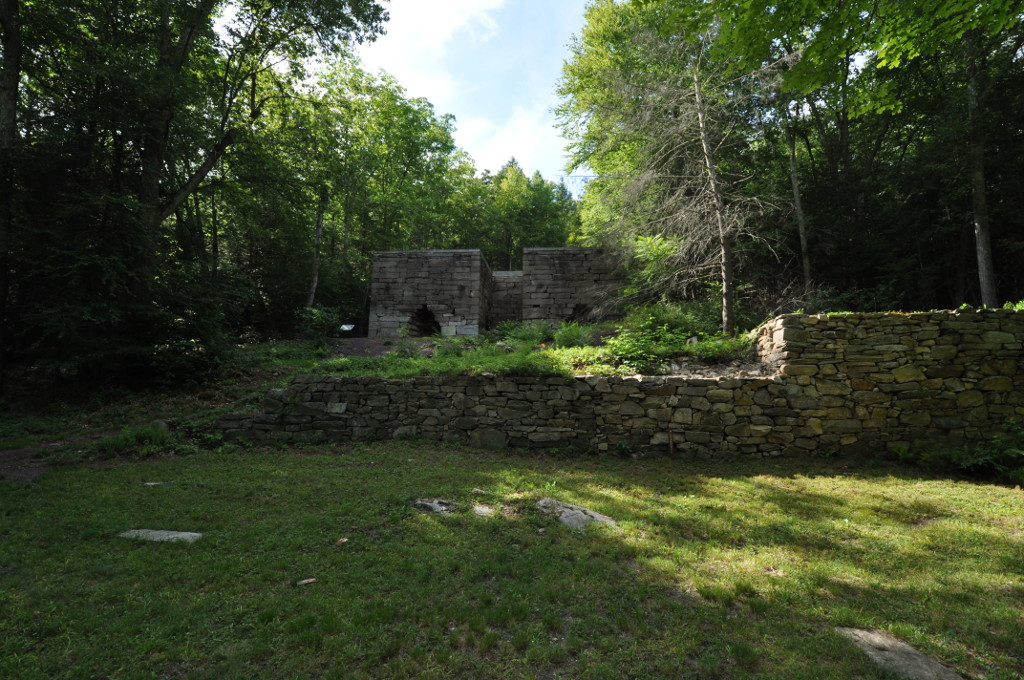

- Location within Connecticut Location within the United States
- Location: Mine Hill Road, Roxbury, Connecticut
- Coordinates: 41°33′39″N 73°20′7″W
- Area: 365 acres (148 ha)
- Built: 1750
- Built by: Bartram, Newton
- NRHP reference No.: 79002621
- Added to NRHP: June 24, 1979

Mine Hills Preserve is a natural and historical conservation area on Mine Hills Road in northwestern Roxbury, Connecticut. Owned by the Roxbury Land Trust, it protects the site of a well-preserved 19th-century iron mine and furnace works. Several miles of trails provide access to abandoned quarry areas and the preserved remains of the iron works, whose uses are explained by informational panels. The preserve is open from dawn to dusk. The 360-acre (150 ha) preserve was listed on the National Register of Historic Places in 1979.

== Description and history ==
When Roxbury was first settled in the 18th century, the land form now known as Mine Hill was called Spruce Hill and was common land. Its stone outcrops were eventually recognized for their minerals, and a few attempts were made in the mid-18th century to extract gold, silver, and lead from the mountain. None of these efforts lasted more than a few years, but shafts dug into the hill survive from this period. In the early 19th century a geological analysis found the presence of carbonated iron ore, a rare and highly desirable form of ore that was probably unknown to the early miners. Disputes over land ownership delayed exploitation of the resource until 1865, when the Shepaug Spathic Iron and Steel Company purchased the hill and began to develop it. It set up a mining operation, with a railroad carrying ore to furnaces near the base of the hill, and built a small town for the workers. Mineral Spring Brook was dammed to create a reservoir that would provide a reliable water supply. Later in the 19th century, a granite quarry was also opened near the base of hill, its products were transported by rail to market in New York City. The iron furnace and mining operation was closed in 1905, and the stone quarry closed in 1935.

The preserve occupies 360 acres (150 ha) north of Mine Hills Road in northwestern Roxbury. It occupies the eastern face of the eponymous hill, whose summit and western portions are in neighboring New Milford. A parking area on Mine Hills Road provides access to the trails. There is a short (0.2 mile) loop leading to the area where the blast furnaces are located, and a longer 3.5-mile trail that loops through the areas where the 18th and 19th-century mining activities took place. A short 0.3-mmile trail provides access to the reservoir site.

== See also ==
- National Register of Historic Places listings in Litchfield County, Connecticut
