= Paul Cornoyer =

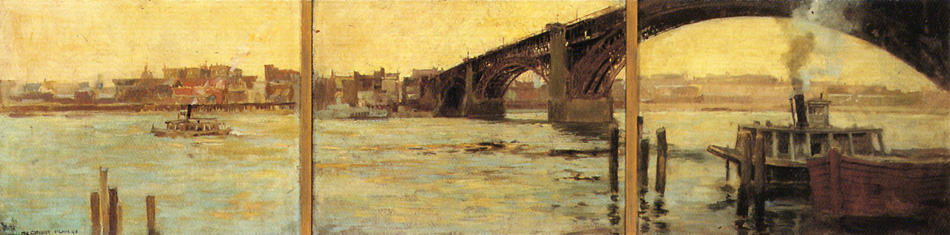
A View of St. Louis: A Triptych, oil on canvas, 1898

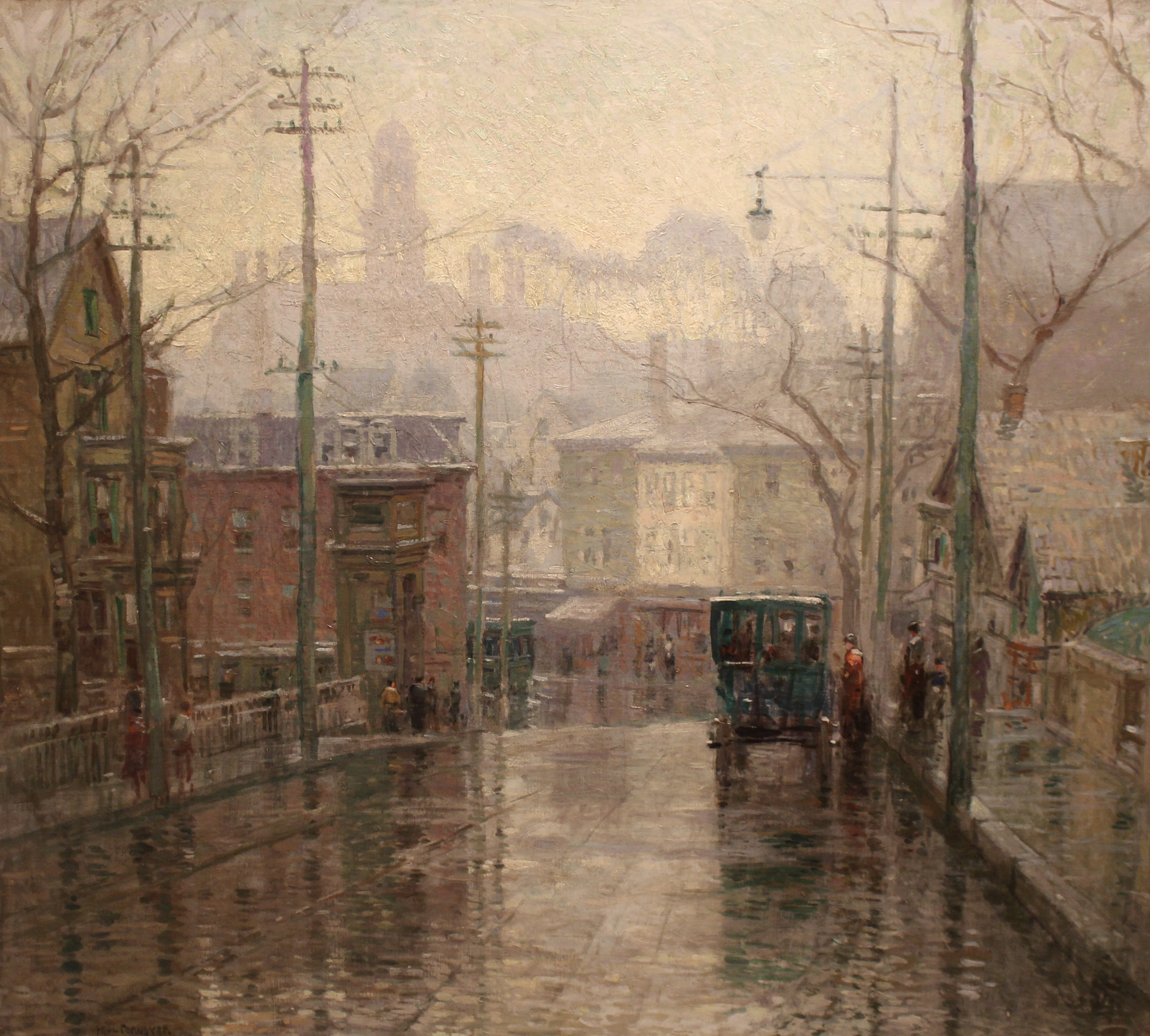
After the Rain Gloucester

Paul Cornoyer (1864–1923) was an American painter, currently best known for his popularly reproduced painting in an Impressionist, tonalist, and sometimes pointillist style.

Born in St. Louis, Missouri, Cornoyer began painting in Barbizon style and first exhibited in 1887. In 1889, He moved to Paris, where he studied at the Académie Julian alongside Jules Lefebvre and Jean-Joseph Benjamin-Constant. After returning from his studies in Paris in 1894, Cornoyer was heavily influenced by the American tonalists. At the urging of William Merritt Chase, he moved to New York City in 1899. In 1908, the Albright–Knox Art Gallery (formerly the Albright Gallery) hosted a show of his work. In 1909, he was elected into the National Academy of Design as an Associate Academician. He taught at Mechanics Institute of New York and in 1917, he moved to Massachusetts, where he continued to teach and paint.

Cornoyer received a retrospective exhibition entitled Paul Cornoyer: American Impressionist at the Lakeview Center for the Arts and Sciences in Peoria, Illinois in 1973. The exhibit drew heavily from the collection of Dr. and Mrs. Lawrence Ashby, who loaned multiple paintings to the exhibit, as well as over 20 works on paper.
