= History of Newtown, Connecticut =

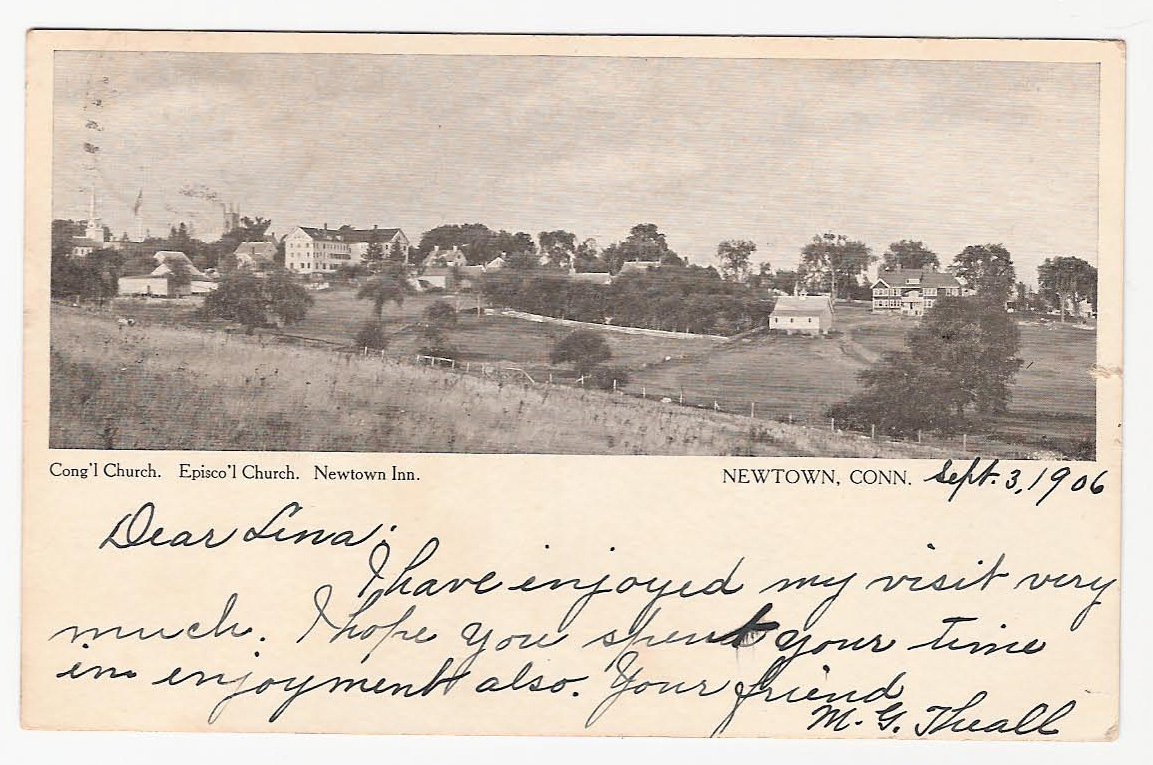
Newtown in 1906

The history of Newtown, Connecticut.

== 18th century ==
Historical population of Newtown
1756	1,253
1774	2,229
1782	2,404
1790	2,764
1800	2,903
1810	2,834
1820	2,879
1830	3,096
1840	3,189
1850	3,338
1860	3,578
1870	3,681
1880	4,013
1890	3,539
1900	3,276
1910	3,012
1920	2,751
1930	2,635
1940	4,023
1950	7,448
1960	11,373
1970	16,942
1980	19,107
1990	20,779
2000	25,031
2010	27,560
2020	27,173

Newtown Meeting House served as the town's Congregational Church for many years.

The town of Newtown, originally known as Quanneapague, was purchased from the Pohtatuck Indians in 1705. In 1708, 36 Connecticut Englishmen petitioned the General Assembly to settle an area north of Stratford (at least seven men previously had been given permission to settle the area). The 36 became "petition proprietors" legally entitled to own its common land and share in the division when the town decided to parcel out tracts into private hands. The town was incorporated in 1711.

In 1709, a "Town Plat" (essentially a planned design for the town's roads and properties) was established. The plan called for a 132-foot (40 m) wide north–south road (now Main Street), intersected by a northern and southern Cross Highway (now West Street, Church Hill Road and Glover Avenue Route 302). 4-acre (16,000 m^{2}) home lots were distributed in 1710 to proprietors, which then totaled 48 men. A 49th parcel was reserved for the minister when one was chosen.

The town's first settlers had a lot in common. They were generally in their late 20s and early 30s, mostly from Stratford and Milford, and second- and third-generation immigrants and farmers to a man. A move to the interior meant they could have more land to farm. Most of the men settled with their families on the original 4-acre (16,000 m^{2}) plots in a relatively compact village near the main street.

Their houses were built in the saltbox or Cape Cod cottage style and were 1½ or 2 stories high. In the back were barns, privies and other small outbuildings, and typically an orchard farther back. Small gardens were started for vegetables and herbs.

Originally, each proprietor's property was scattered. In addition to the 4-acre (16,000 m^{2}) plots for homes, land was given out for planting and grazing land. The first division gave each proprietor a 4-acre (16,000 m^{2}) meadow lot to the south of the village, near Deep Brook. Then a division was made for 4 acres (16,000 m^{2}) for "pitch" — parcels for crop fields near the village. Then each received a 20-acre (81,000 m^{2}) parcel somewhere else in town. Almost all of the town's land was divided up within 20 years.

For convenience, proprietors began moving away from the central village and to some of their larger parcels, and several proprietors with land in the same area tended to move out together to reduce isolation. One of the first of these outlying settlements was Sandy Hook, settled within a year of the start of the village. The Potatuck River at Sandy Hook allowed for the setting up of saw and grist mills.

Other concentrations of settlers (as seen from the establishment of schools) were at the area around Taunton Lake (school founded in 1738); Zoar to the east and Land's End to the north (both in 1748); Palestine petitioned for a school in 1748; Hanover got its school in 1755. By 1760 the town had seven school districts, including two in the village. There were 20 by 1794. (The districts were abolished in the 1920s, but their names have survived and are still use in designating various neighborhoods or areas of town. Other names include Dodgingtown, Hattertown, Lake George, and Head O'Meadow.)

=== American Revolution ===
Newtown was a stronghold of Tory sentiment during the early American Revolutionary War. French General Rochambeau and his troops encamped here in 1781 on their way to the siege of Yorktown, Virginia, which ended the Revolution.

The rooster weathervane (a town symbol), located atop the Newtown Meeting House, is said to have been used as a target by French soldiers encamped here in 1781 during the Revolutionary War.

== 19th century ==
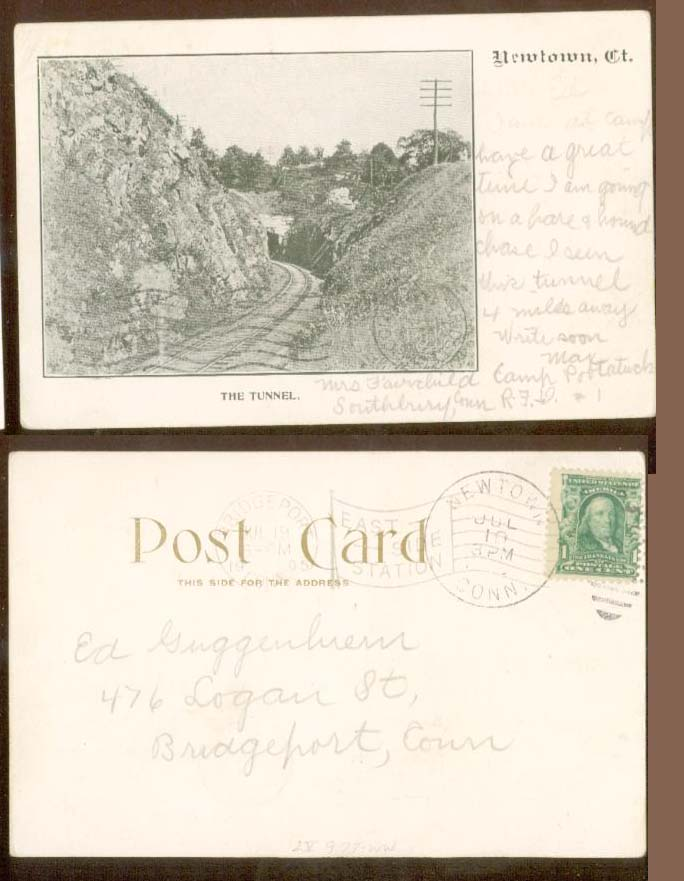
Railroad tunnel, from a postcard sent in 1905

In the early 19th century, several small industries developed along the town's rivers, which supplied power to the water wheels of shops and mills. Hat making was an early industry, but the several small shops that developed were put out of business by the 1880s by the larger, more efficient factories in Danbury and Bethel.

Button and comb production thrived until the late 19th century. Both buttons and combs were made from the horns, bones and hooves of animals, all plentiful in an agricultural town. At one point there were 14 button shops, but after the Civil War, plastic began to replace the older materials and the industry shriveled. Two button shops remained in 1900, one of which finally went out of business after a fire in 1926. The other, S. Curtis and Co., survived by remaking itself into a manufacturer of cardboard boxes and is now Curtis Packaging, Inc.

An important crossroads throughout its early history, the village of Hawleyville briefly emerged as a railroad center and the town's population grew to over 4,000 circa 1881. In the following decades, the population dwindled to a low of 2,635 in 1930 before again growing.

Local industry has included the manufacture of furniture, tea bags, combs, fire hose, folding boxes, buttons, and hats, as well as farming and mica and feldspar mining.

The town flag pole, which remains a prominent landmark, was first erected in 1876.

The Newtown Bee, the weekly newspaper based in town, was founded in 1877, and owned (and operated) by the Smith family since 1881.

=== Irish ===
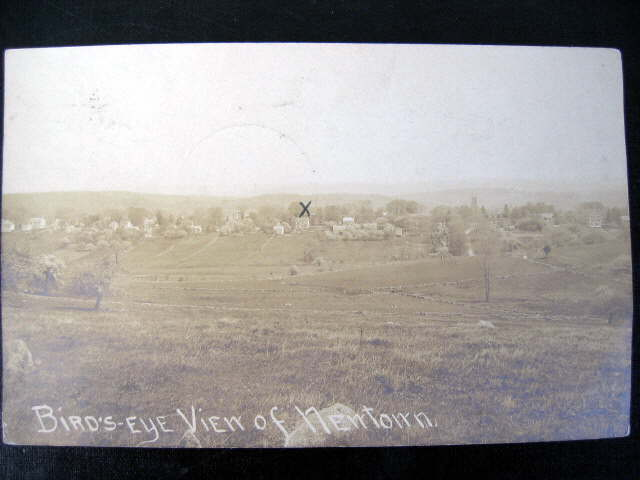
Postcard: "Bird's Eye View of Newtown" sent January 10, 1900

The town experienced a big change with an influx of Irish immigrants, many of whom came through the area as railroad workers in the early 19th century and stayed to farm land abandoned by earlier farmers.

Most of the early Irish residents lived in the Sandy Hook and Walnut Tree Hill neighborhoods, as well as farms along Route 25 in the Botsford section of town. "The Irish were very polarizing socially, religiously, and politically in town," said Daniel Cruson, the town historian, in a 2007 interview. "There was very little Catholic presence in town when the Irish moved in, and with the increase in the Irish population, St. Rose (Roman Catholic Church) saw a big lift in membership, for instance." As more Irish moved into town in the 19th century, they changed the town's political majority from Republican to Democrat.

The proportion of the town's Irish-American population went from 5.6 percent in 1850 to 41.8 percent in 1890, and by 1900 it was up to 44 percent. Many of the immigrants came to Newtown from one small area of County Clare, according to Harlan Jessup, a local genealogist.

Many found work in the local factories and button shops. At one point, according to Jessup, the New York Belting and Packing rubber factory in town employed 200 people — 185 of whom were Irish. Many Irishwomen worked as domestic laborers, seamstresses and lace makers.

Tensions between the Yankees and Irish ran high. One Irishmen, James E. Madigan, published the popular Newtown Chronicle from 1880 to 1882, a Democratic, working-class rival to The Newtown Bee, a self-professed independent newspaper then hobbled by poor management. The Chronicle devoted one page of each four-page issue to news from Ireland. Not until after World War II were the Irish finally accepted, according to Cruson.

== 20th century ==
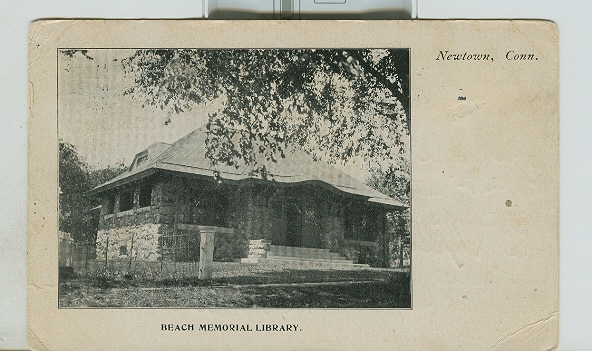
Before the Booth library there was the Beach Memorial Library, pictured here in a postcard mailed in 1910

Hawley School was constructed in the 1920s and over the years has been used as a whole-town school, a high school, and (currently) an elementary school. Though it has been many different school functions, its original section has remained much the same, though two additions have been added since its construction.

In the 1930s, some significant buildings and institutions were built in town.

The "Fairfield Hills" state mental health hospital was erected in the 1930s and operated until its closure in the 1990s.

Architect Philip Sutherland designed both the Edmond Town Hall and the Cyrenius H. Booth Library, both completed in the 1930s. The town hall contains not only town offices, but a movie theater, a gymnasium for sports, parties and craft shows; the Alexandria Room, used for weddings, parties and recitals; and other, smaller meeting rooms.

Newtown's Booth Memorial public library was opened December 17, 1932 with a capacity for 25,000 volumes. The library is a posthumous gift of Mary Elizabeth Hawley and was named after her maternal grandfather, a doctor in town from 1820 until his death in 1871. Hawley's gift not only paid for construction of the building, but included a trust fund of about $250,000 which resulted in the town not financing the library until the 1980s. The library building was considered one of the most modern libraries of its time. Not only fireproof, it was furnished with cork floors and acoustic ceiling tiles to deaden sound, and had a built-in humidifying unit and a centralized vacuum cleaner. In January 1998 an addition to the rear of the building was completed and officially opened, doubling the available floor space.

The game of Scrabble was developed in Newtown by a town resident. In 1948, a lawyer, bought the rights to manufacture the game in exchange for granting the inventor a royalty on every unit sold. Though he left most of the game (including the distribution of letters) unchanged, Brunot slightly rearranged the "premium" squares of the board and simplified the rules; he also changed the name of the game from "Criss-Crosswords" to "Scrabble", a real word which means "to grope frantically," and sold sets to, among other customers, Macy's department store, which created a demand for the game.

The town adopted a charter to reorganize local government in 1961 and most recently revised it in 2001. The charter retains a limited Town Meeting form of government with a three-member elected Board of Selectmen, a First Selectman acting as the town's chief executive and administrative officer, and a 12-member Legislative Council acting as the legislative body, and a six-member Board of Finance.

== 21st century ==
The town purchased the Fairfield Hills mental health hospital property and, as of 2007, was considering options for using the tract.

== See also ==
- Newtown, CT#Landmarks, a list of historic landmarks in Newtown, including places listed on the National Register of Historic Places
