= Hemlock Reservoir =

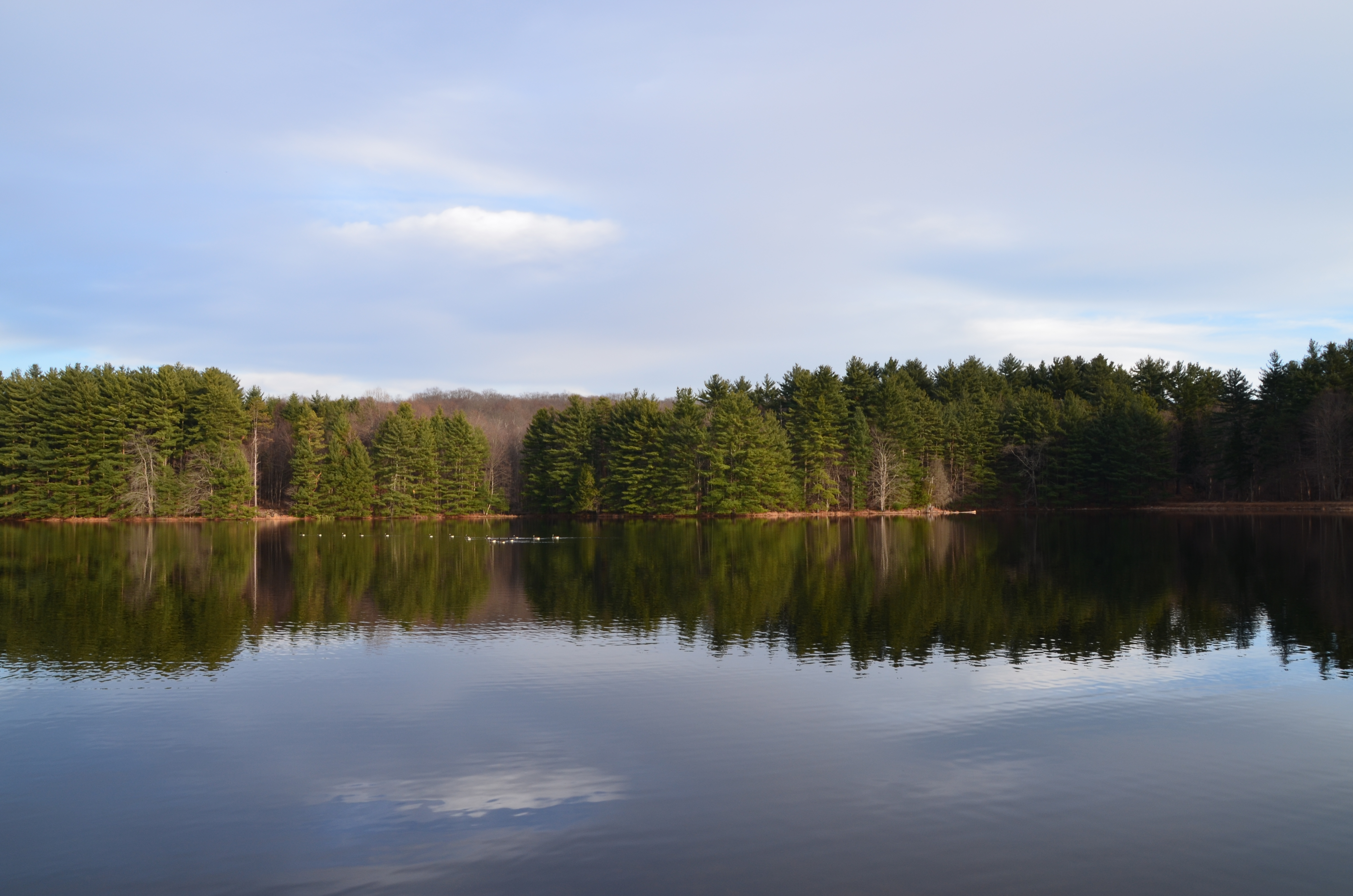

- Location within Connecticut Location within the United States
- Location: Fairfield County, Connecticut, United States
- Coordinates: 41°13′06″N 73°17′29″W
- Type: reservoir
- Primary inflows: Saugatuck River
- Primary outflows: Saugatuck River
- Catchment area: 5.3 square miles (14 km^{2})
- Basin countries: United States
- Surface area: 437 acres (1.77 km^{2})
- Water volume: 11,662 acre-feet (14,385,000 m^{3})
- Surface elevation: 226 ft (69 m)

The Hemlock Reservoir is a reservoir in Fairfield, Connecticut, United States. Its completion was marked by the creation of the Hemlock Reservoir Dam, which was completed in 1914, and provides water to Fairfield, Bridgeport, and several other nearby towns.

In 2020, Aquarion Water Co., owner of the reservoir and dam, submitted an application to transfer up to 14.2 million gallons per day of water from the Greater Bridgeport System, primarily including the Hemlock Reservoir system, to the Southwest Fairfield County Region. Critics worry that this would impact the water quality from the reservoir.

Largemouth bass, chain pickerel, and rainbow trout are commonly found in the reservoir, but fishing is prohibited.
