= Daniel Bartlett =

Daniel Bartlett may refer to:

- Daniel Bartlett (footballer) (born 2000), English footballer
- Dan Bartlett (born 1971), counselor to the President during the George W. Bush administration
- D. Brook Bartlett (1937–2000), American judge
- Daniel Bartlett, namesake of the Daniel and Esther Bartlett House, a historic house in Connecticut that is listed in the National Register of Historic Places

== See also ==
- Daniel Bartlett Allyn (born 1959), U.S. Army general
- Daniel Bartlett Stevens (1837–1924), American politician and member of the Wisconsin State Assembly
