= Jeffrey S. Grenier =

American historian and archivist

Jeffrey S. Grenier (born 1967) is an American historian and archivist. Since 1997, he has been the president of the Watertown Historical Society, a non-profit organization based in Litchfield County, Connecticut; he previously served as the society's treasurer from 1993 to 1997.

In his leadership capacity, Grenier has been responsible for preserving the educational, commercial, cultural and media history of Watertown, Connecticut. His leadership in coordinating a newspaper digitization project that transferred the society's newspaper archive from print and microfilm editions was honored in 2008 with a special award from the Connecticut League of Historical Organizations. In September 2007, he received the Community Service Award from the Daughters of the American Revolution for his commitment to preserving and protecting Connecticut's historical heritage.
