= Greenwich Historical Society =

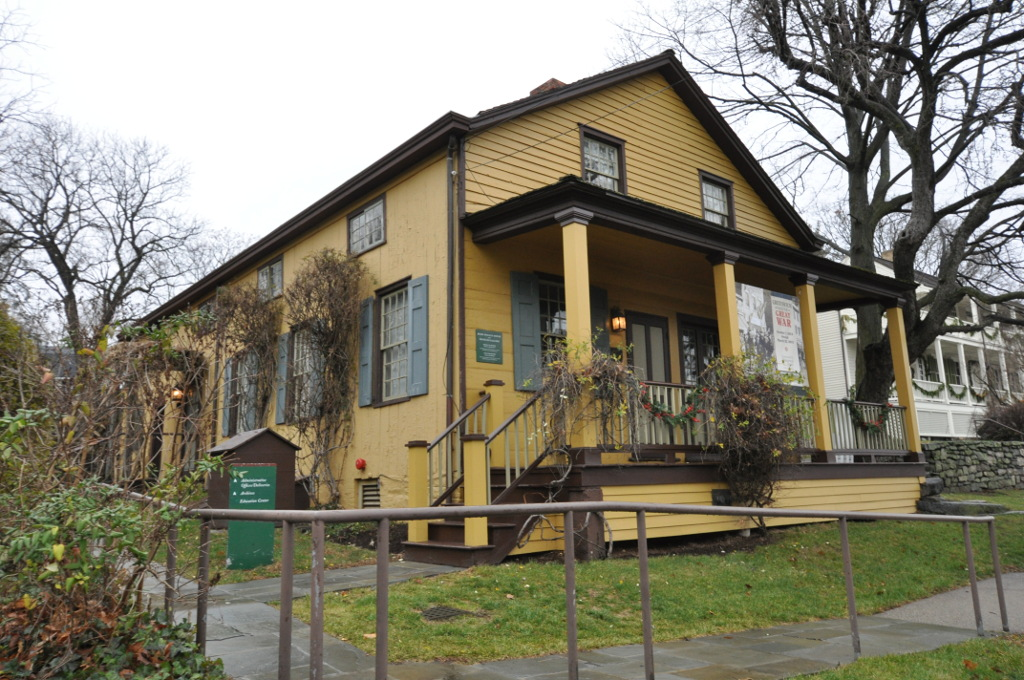
- Administration Building adjacent to Bush-Holley House
- Formation: December 8, 1931; 94 years ago
- Type: Nonprofit, Historical Society
- Headquarters: 47 Strickland Road; Cos Cob, Connecticut, U.S. 06807
- Executive Director and CEO: Carol B. Cadou
- Website: greenwichhistory.org
- Formerly called: The Historical Society of Greenwich

Greenwich Historical Society (also Bush-Holley House Archives and Museum) is an independent 501(c)(3) nonprofit organization dedicated on preserving and displaying history of Greenwich, Connecticut. The society hosts exhibits, markets and community events and provides lectures and other educational programs. Founded in 1931, the society acquired the historic Bush-Holley House in 1957. Greenwich Historical Society is accredited by the American Alliance of Museums. Further it is a member of Historic Artists Homes and Studios, having a permanent collection of John Henry Twachtman paintings and is one of 21 museums of the Connecticut Art Trail.

== Organization ==
The society is headquartered at 47 Strickland Road in the Cos Cob section of Greenwich, Connecticut and is managed by the appointed board of trustees and a team of approximately 20 part and full-time staff. The current President and CEO is Debra L. Mecky, PhD.

== History ==
The Historical Society of Greenwich (original nonprofit and predecessor of today's society) was formed on December 8, 1931, and housed in a village library in Old Greenwich. Due to growing interest and collections, the society was looking for a permanent location by the 1950s which they ultimately found in Bush-Holley House, which was acquired in 1957.

== See also ==
- List of historical societies in Connecticut
