= Thompson Historical Society =

Historical society in Northeastern Connecticut

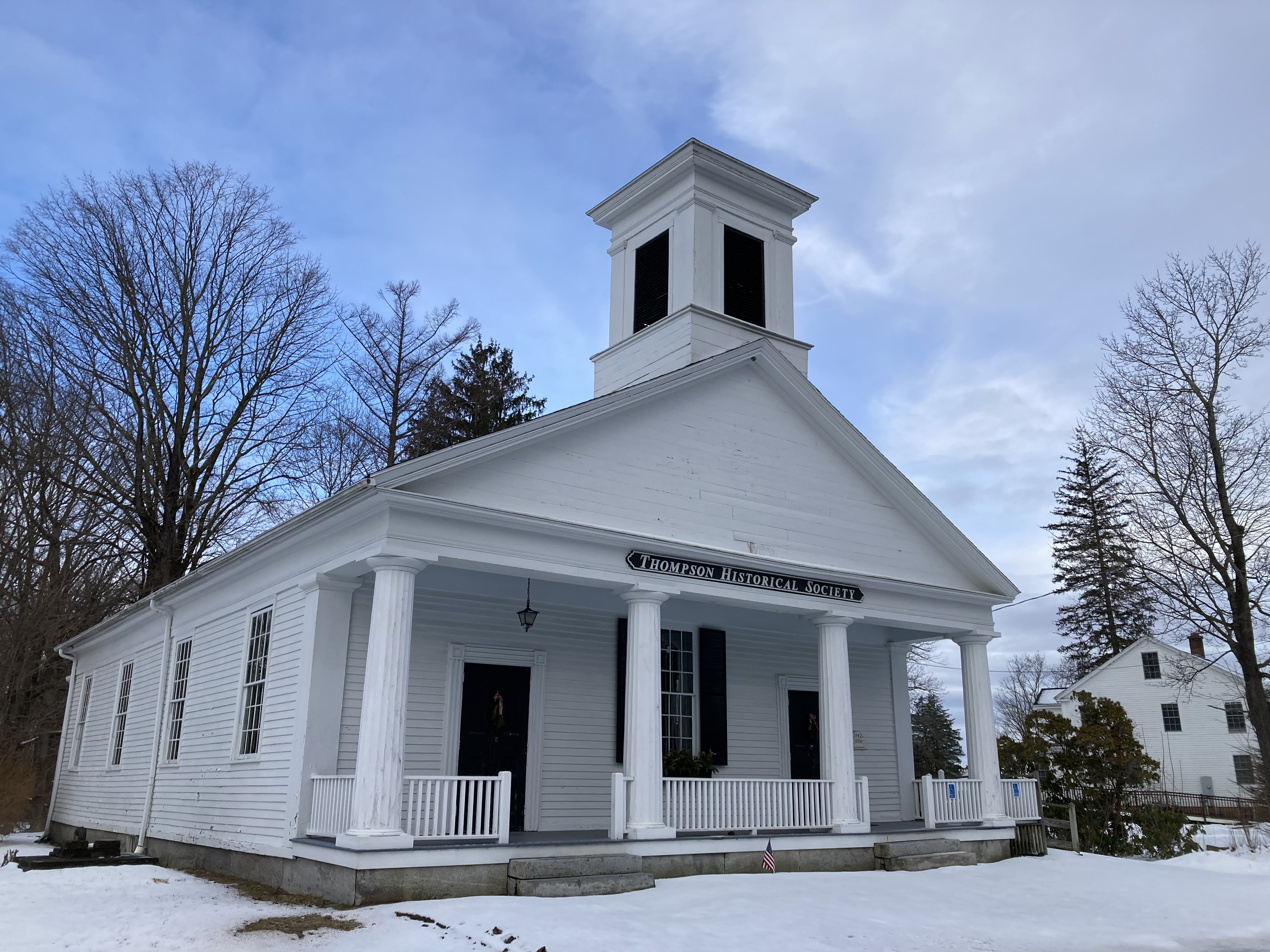
The 1842 Old Town Hall.

The Thompson Historical Society (est. 1968) is a nonprofit organization located in Thompson, Connecticut, dedicated to the local history of Thompson's 10 villages. The society owns two buildings, the 1902 Thompson Library (now the Thompson Museum) and the 1842 Old Town Hall, both contributing properties to the Thompson Hill Historic District. Both were purchased from the town of Thompson - the Old Town Hall in 1969, and the museum in 2017.

== Thompson Museum at the Ellen Larned Memorial building ==
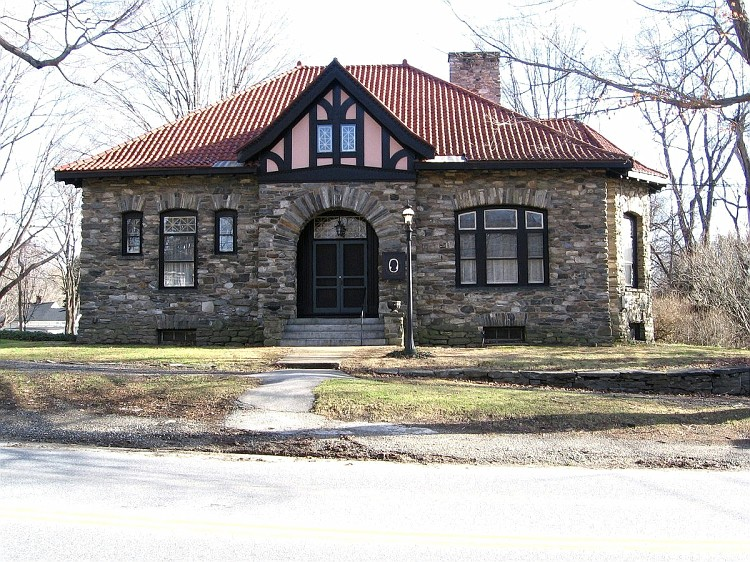
Thompson Museum at the Ellen Larned Memorial Building

The organizational headquarters is the building once known as the Thompson Library, built in 1902. In 1995, the town of Thompson leased the old town library on Thompson Hill to the Thompson Historical Society. The building was named the Ellen Larned Memorial Building, after historian and Thompson native Ellen Larned. In 2005 and 2006, permanent displays were added to create the Thompson Museum. The town of Thompson officially transferred permanent ownership of the building to the Thompson Historical Society in 2017.

== Tourtellotte Memorial High School exhibits ==
Located in the Tourtellotte Memorial High School (North Grosvenordale, CT), the Memorial Room Museum collection is maintained by the Thompson Historical Society. The museum and its contents were donated by Dr. and Mrs. Tourtellotte in 1909, to honor their two deceased daughters Lucy and Hattie Tourtellotte. The museum underwent a thorough renovation in 2009. Also hosted within the Tourtellotte Memorial High School and managed by the Thompson Historical Society are the Ramsdell Transportation Collection (a collection of railroad photographs donated by Dale King) and the Kenney Store and Post Office Exhibit (a restoration of the original building's interior, donated by Glennyce Kenney).

== The Nine Lives of No. 9: The True Story of the Ramsdell Train (2021) ==
In 2021, the Thompson Historical Society produced an original documentary film, directed by Blair Cole, documenting the history and restoration of a Maine Narrow Gauge train that had resided in Thompson, CT for over 60 years. The film first aired on Connecticut Public Television and on other PBS stations in New England on November 7, 2021.

== Gallery ==
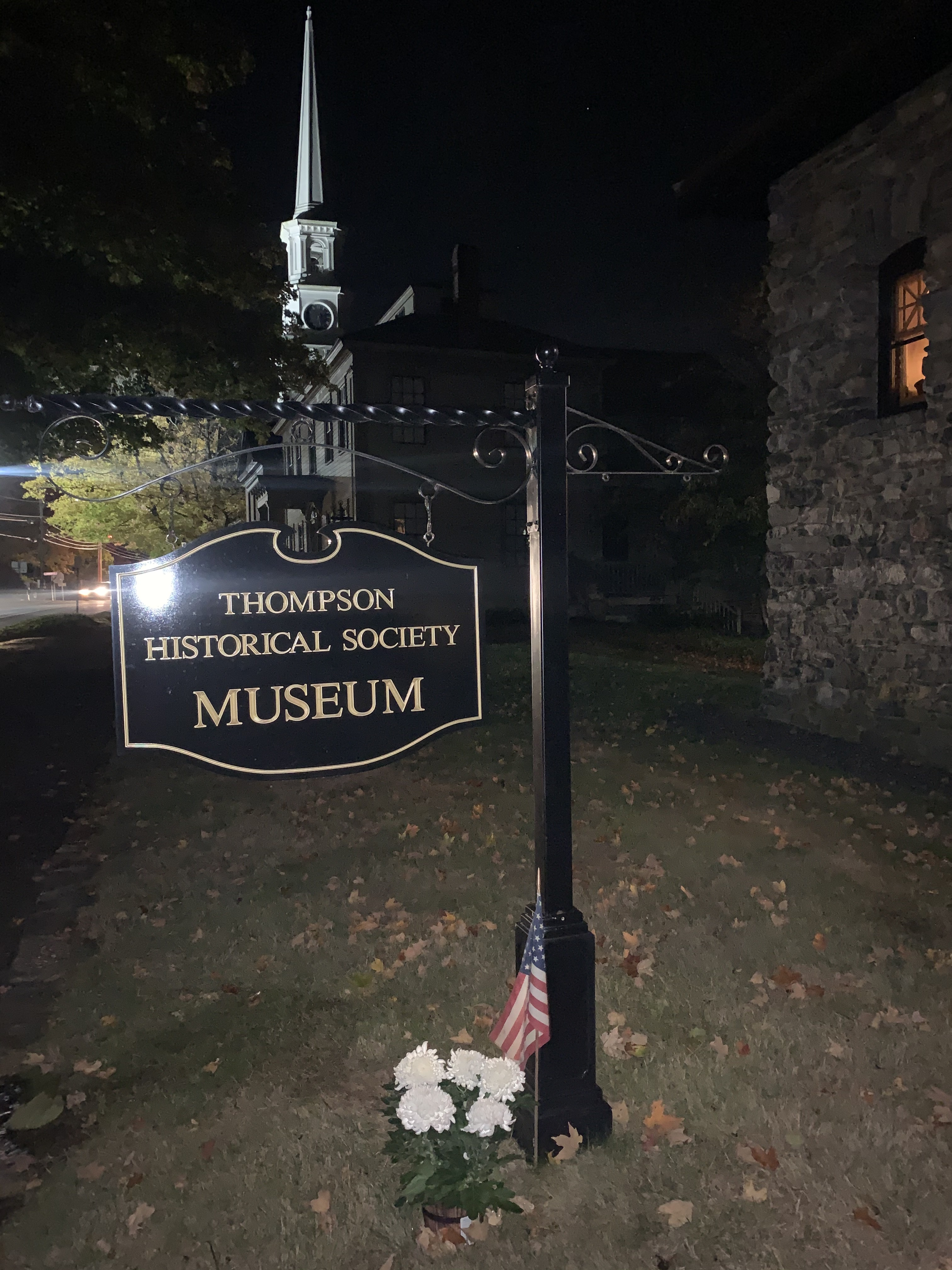
Sign in front of the Thompson Historical Society Museum.

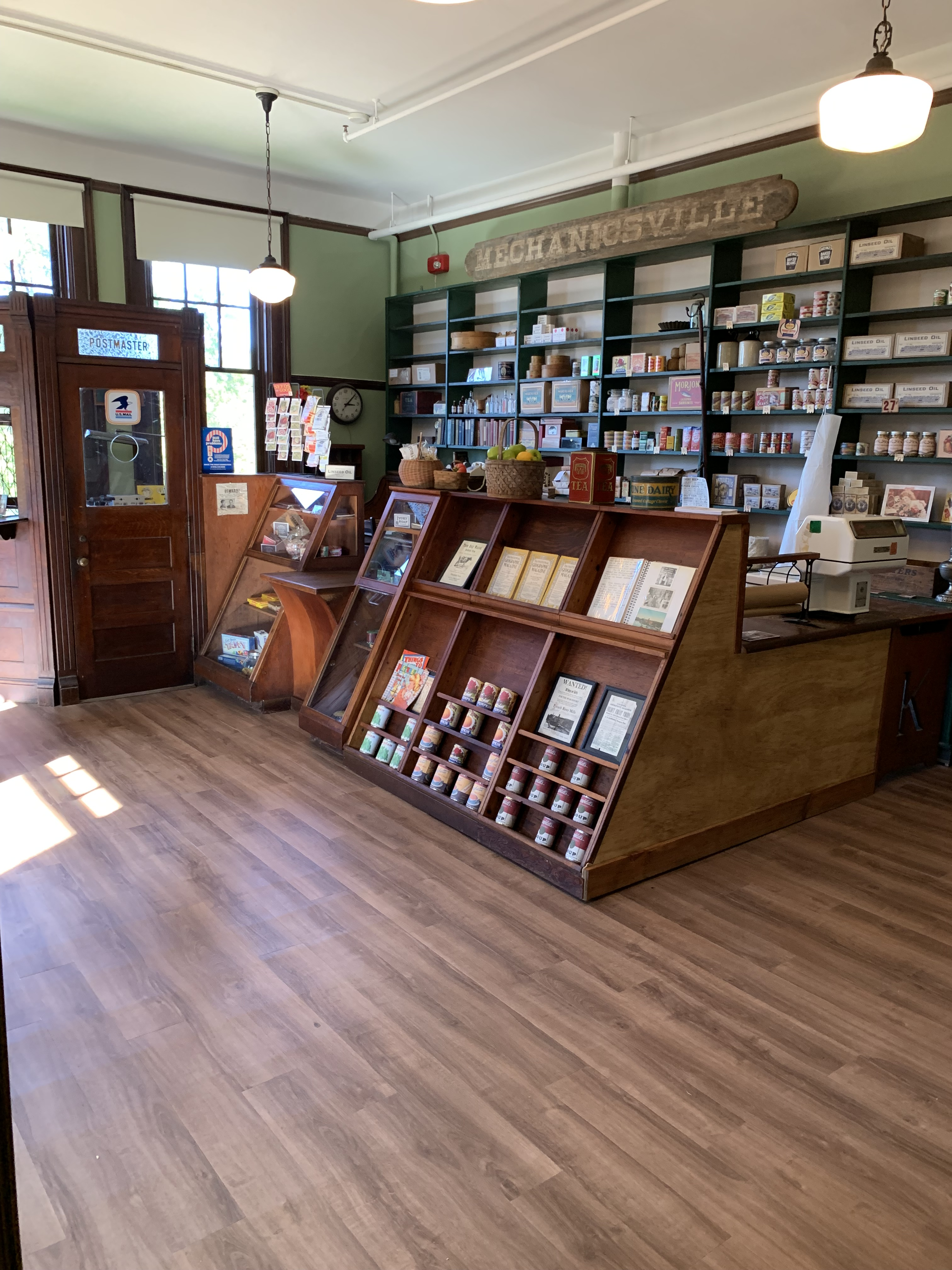
Kenney Store & Post Office Exhibit at the Tourtellotte Memorial High School

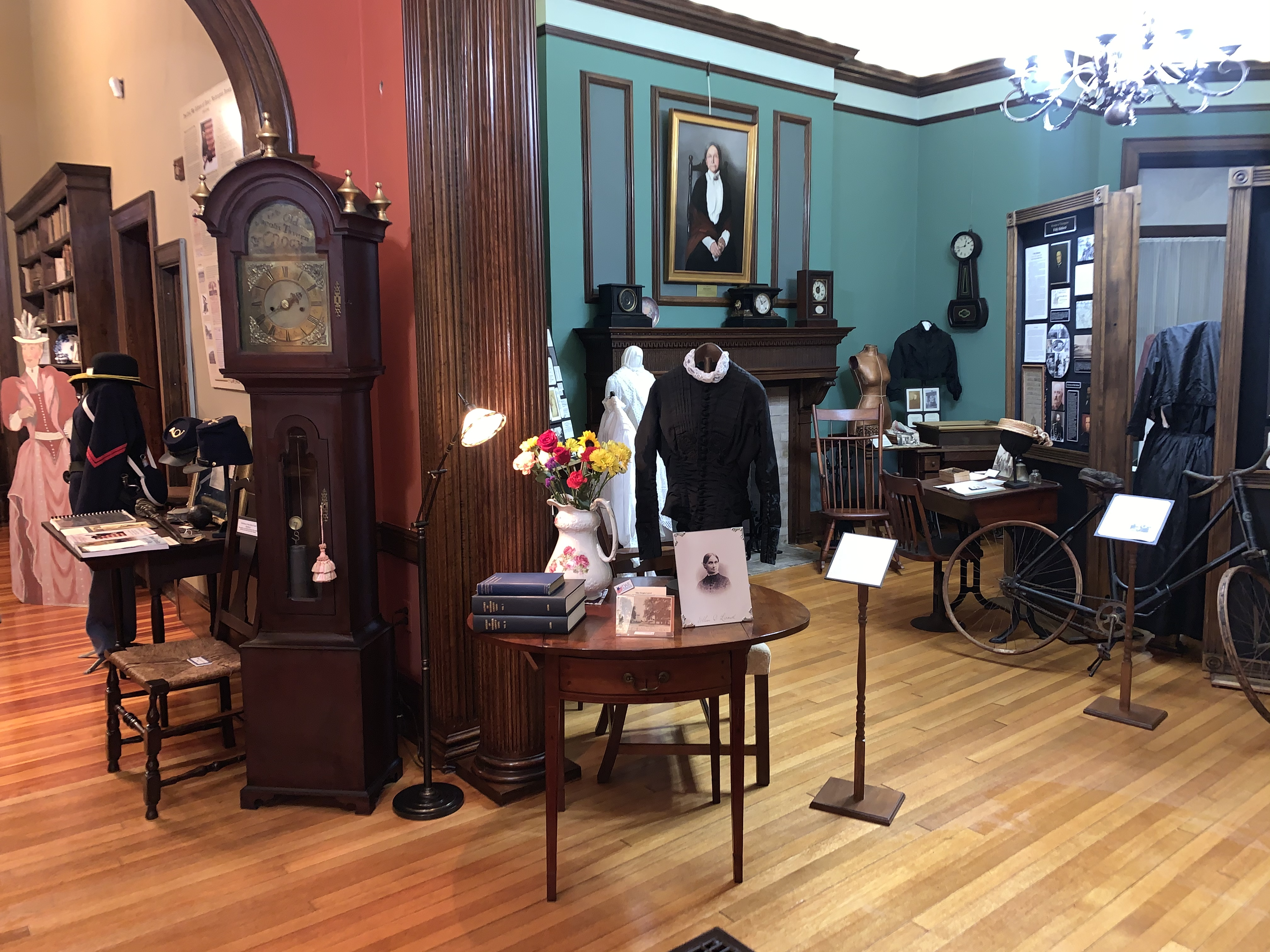
Ellen Larned Memorial Building Museum

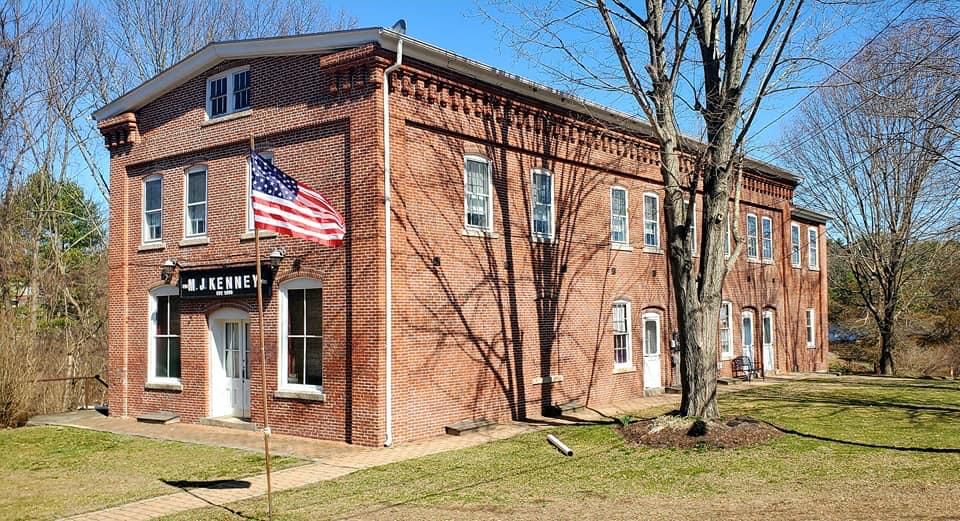
Original Kenney Store & Post Office in Mechanicsville, CT - the exhibit at the Tourtellotte Memorial High School is a recreation of the interior of this building.

== See also ==
- List of historical societies in Connecticut
