= Redding Historical Society =

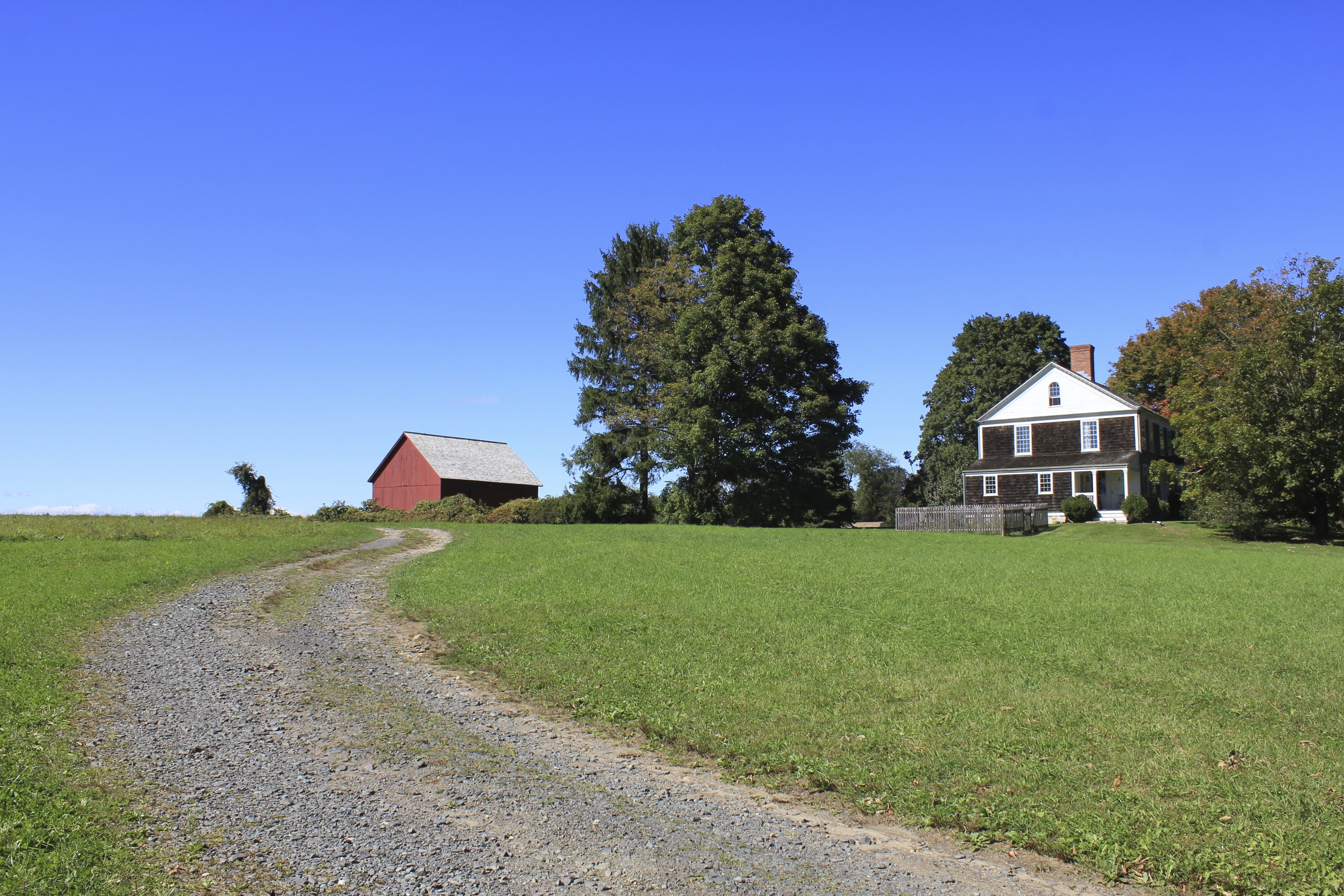
- Lonetown Farm and Museum
- Formation: December 14, 1964; 60 years ago
- Type: Nonprofit, Historical Society
- Headquarters: 43 Lonetown Road; Redding, Connecticut, U.S. 06896
- President: Robert E. Moran
- Website: Official website

Redding Historical Society (RHS) is an independent incorporated 501(c)(3) nonprofit organization with a mission to educate, preserve and promote the history of Redding, Connecticut. Founded in 1964, the society is headquartered at the Daniel and Esther Bartlett House in Redding Center Historic District.

== Organization ==
RHS was incorporated on December 14, 1964, and is headquartered at Lonetown Farm and Museum at 43 Lonetown Road, Redding, CT 06896 which is also known as Daniel and Esther Bartlett House. The current organization consists of:

- Robert E. Moran (President)
- Joseph Bonomo (Vice President)
- Denise Jankovic (Treasurer)
- Janice Dimon (Secretary)

== See also ==
- List of historical societies in Connecticut
