= List of historical societies in Connecticut =

The following is a list of historical societies in the state of Connecticut, United States.

== Organizations ==
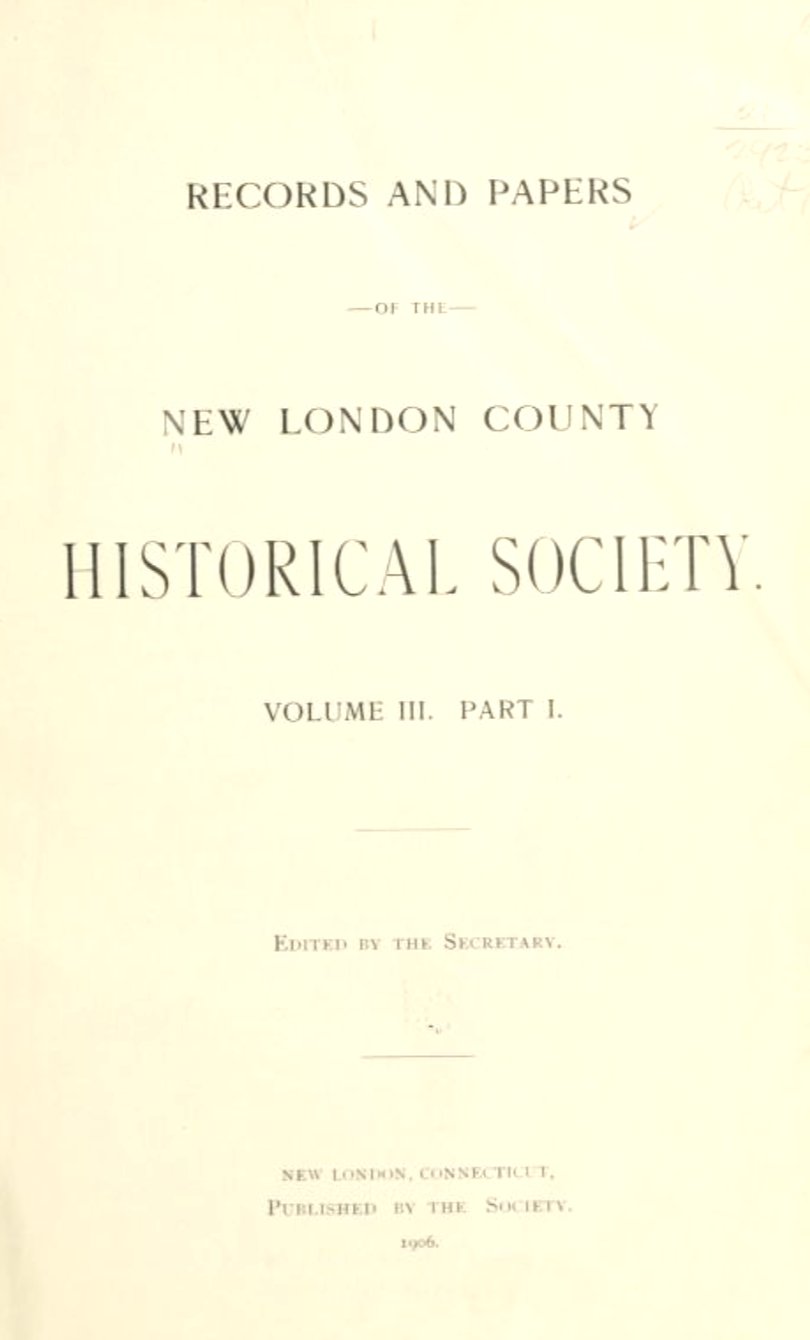
Title page of the 1890 Records and Papers of the New London County Historical Society, volume 3, Connecticut

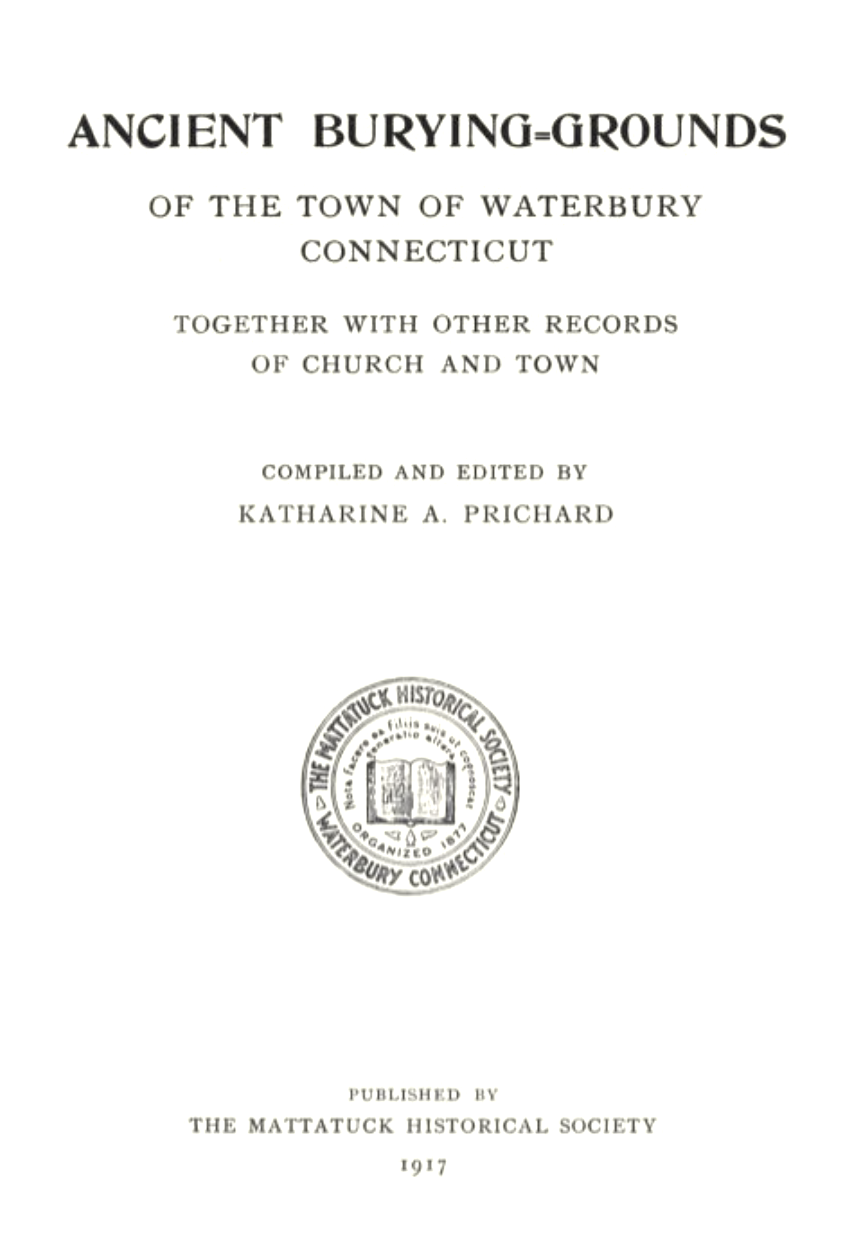
Title page of 1917 publication of the Mattatuck Historical Society, Waterbury, Connecticut

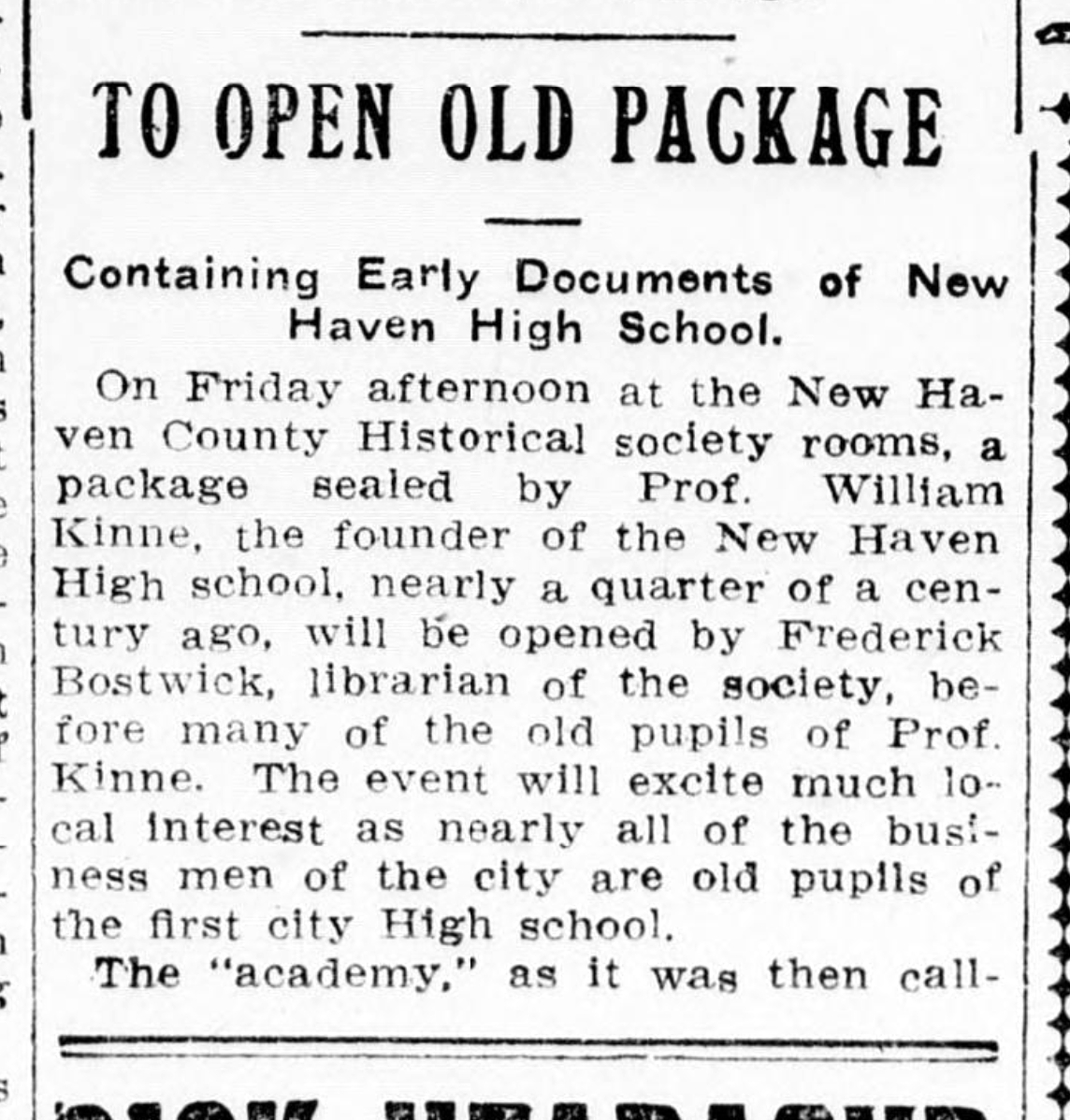
1909 newspaper item about the New Haven County Historical Society, Connecticut

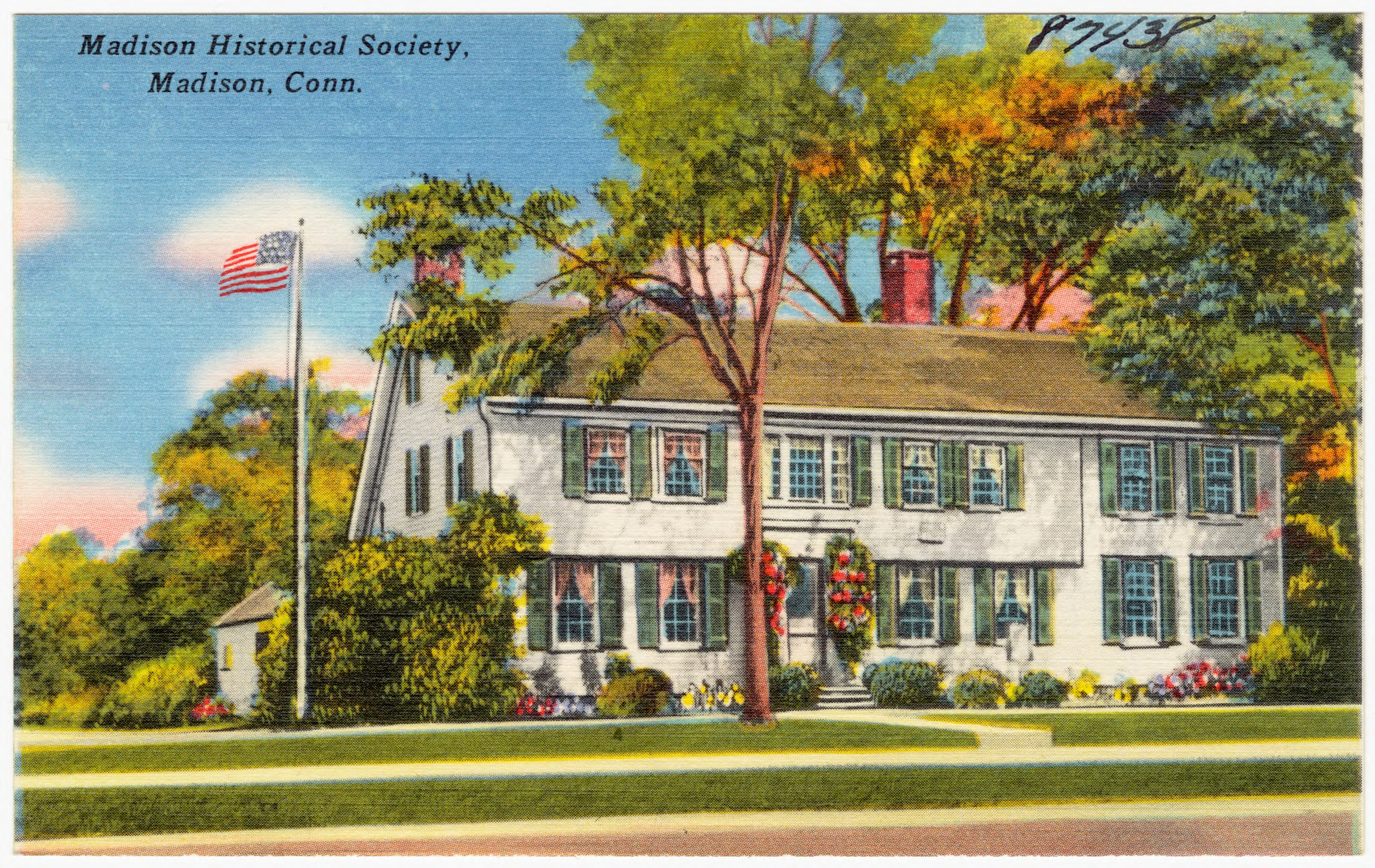
Postcard of the Madison Historical Society building in Connecticut, circa 1940s

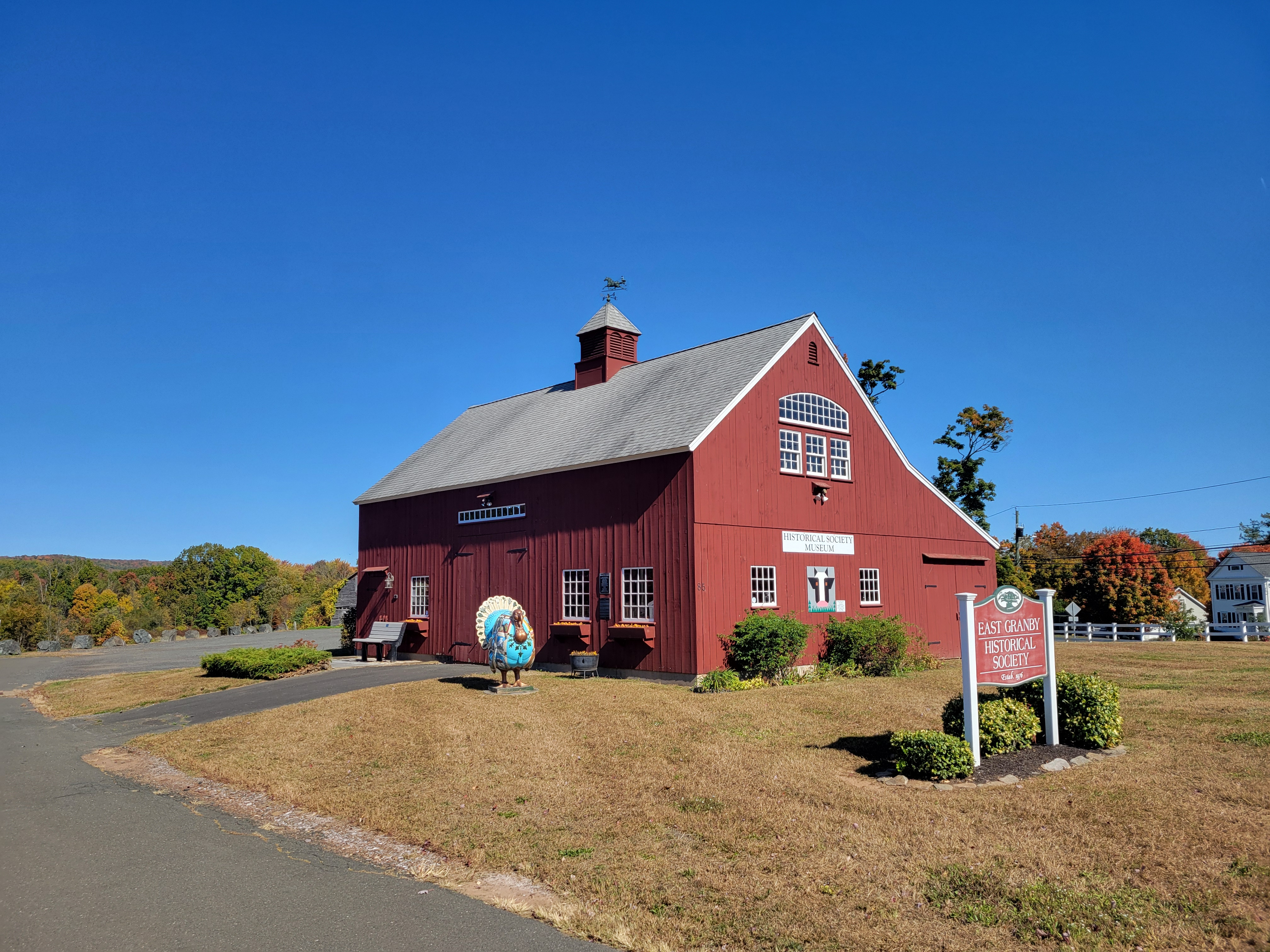
East Granby Historical Society building, Connecticut (photo 2024)

- Amity & Woodbridge Historical Society
- Andover Historical Society
- Ashford Historical Society
- Aspinock Historical Society of Putnam
- Avon Historical Society
- Bantam Historical Society
- Barkhamsted Historical Society
- Beacon Falls Historical Society
- Berlin Historical Society
- Bethany Historical Society
- Bethel Historical Society
- Old Bethlem Historical Society in Bethlehem, CT
- Bolton Historical Society
- Branford Historical Society
- Bridgeport Community Historical Society
- Bridgewater Historical Society
- Bristol Historical Society
- Brookfield Historical Society
- Brooklyn Historical Society, Connecticut
- Burlington Historical Society
- Canterbury Historical Society
- Canton Historical Society
- Chatham Historical Society
- Cheshire Historical Society
- Chester Historical Society
- Clinton Historical Society, Connecticut
- Colchester Historical Society
- Colebrook Historical Society
- Columbia Historical Society, Connecticut
- Connecticut Electric Railway Association
- Connecticut Museum of Culture and History (formerly Connecticut Historical Society)
- Cornwall Historical Society
- Coventry Historical Society Incorpporated
- Cromwell Historical Society
- Crystal Lake Historical Society
- Danbury Museum and Historical Society
- Darien Historical Society
- Deep River Historical Society
- Derby Historical Society
- Dorothy Whitfield Historic Society
- Durham Historical Society
- East Granby Historical Society
- East Haddam Historical Society
- Historical Society of East Hartford
- East Haven Historical Society
- East Lyme Historical Society
- East Windsor Historical Society
- Eastford Historical Society
- Historical Society of Easton
- Ellington Historical Society
- Enfield Historical Society
- Essex Historical Society
- African American Historical Association of Fairfield County
- Fairfield Historical Society
- Falls Village Canaan Historical Society
- Farmington Historical Society
- Franklin Historical Society
- Gaylordsville Historical Society
- Historical Society of Glastonbury
- Goshen Historical Society
- Greater New Haven African American Historical Society
- Greater New Haven Labor History Association
- Greenwich Historical Society
- Griswold Historical Society
- Groton Historical Society, Connecticut
- Guilford Keeping Society
- Haddam Historical Society
- Hamden Historical Society
- Hampton Antiquarian and Historical Society
- Hartland Historical Society
- Harwinton Historical Society
- Hebron Historical Society
- Kent Historical Society
- Killingly Historical and Genealogical Society
- Killingworth Historical Society
- Kosciuszko Historical Society of Ansonia
- Lebanon Historical Society
- Ledyard Historical Society
- Lisbon Historical Society
- Litchfield Historical Society
- Madison Historical Society
- Manchester Historical Society, Connecticut
- Mansfield Historical Society
- Marlborough Historical Society
- Mattatuck Museum (formerly Mattatuck Historical Society) in Waterbury CT
- Meriden Historical Society
- Middlebury Historical Society
- Middlefield Historical Society
- Middlesex County Historical Society
- Milford Historical Society Trust
- Monroe Historical Society
- Montville Historical Society
- Morris Historical Society
- Mystic River Historical Society
- Naugatuck Historical Society
- New Canaan Historical Society
- New Fairfield Historical Society
- New Hartford Historical Society
- New Haven Colony Historical Society
- New London County Historical Society
- New Milford Historical Society
- Newington Historical Society and Trust
- Newtown Historical Society
- Noank Historical Society
- Norfolk Historical Society
- North Haven Historical Society
- North Stonington Historical Society
- Northfield Historical Society
- Norwalk Historical Society
- Norwich Historical Society
- Old Lyme Historical Society
- Old Saybrook Historical Society
- Orange Historical Society
- Oxford Historical Society, Connecticut
- Plainfield Historical Society
- Plainville Historical Society
- Plymouth Historical Society
- Pomfret Historical Society
- Portland Historical Society
- Preston Historical Society
- Prospect Historical Society
- Redding Historical Society
- Ridgefield Historical Society
- Rocky-Hill Historical Society
- Rowayton Historical Society
- Roxbury Historical Society
- Salem Historical Society
- Salisbury Association
- Salmon Brook Historical Society
- Saugatuck Historical Society (in Westport)
- Scotland Historical Society
- Seymour Historical Society
- Sharon Historical Society
- Shelton Historical Society
- Sherman Historical Society
- Simsbury Historical Society
- Somers Historical Society
- South Windsor Historical Society
- Southbury Historical Society
- Southington Historical Society
- Sprague Historical Society
- Stafford Historical Society
- Stamford Historical Society
- Stonington Historical Society
- Stratford Historical Society
- Suffield Historical Society
- Thomaston Historical Society
- Thompson Historical Society
- Tolland Historical Society
- Torrington Historical Society
- Totoket Historical Society
- Trumbull Historical Society
- Union Historical Society
- Vernon Historical Society
- Voluntown Historical Society
- Wallingford Historical Society
- Warren Historical Society
- Waterford Historical Society
- Watertown Historical Society
- West Hartford Historical Society
- West Haven Historical Society
- Westbrook Historical Society
- Weston Historical Society
- Westport Historical Society
- Wethersfield Historical Society
- Willington Historical Society
- Wilton Historical Society
- Winchester Center Historical Association
- Winchester Historical Society
- Windham Historical Society
- Windsor Historical Society
- Windsor Locks Historical Society
- Wintonbury Historical Society
- Wolcott Historical Society
- Old Woodbury Historical Society
- Woodstock Historical Society

== See also ==
- History of Connecticut
- List of museums in Connecticut
- National Register of Historic Places listings in Connecticut
- List of historical societies in the United States
