= Salmon Brook Historical Society =

Historic house in Connecticut, United States

- Rowe and Weed Houses
- U.S. National Register of Historic Places
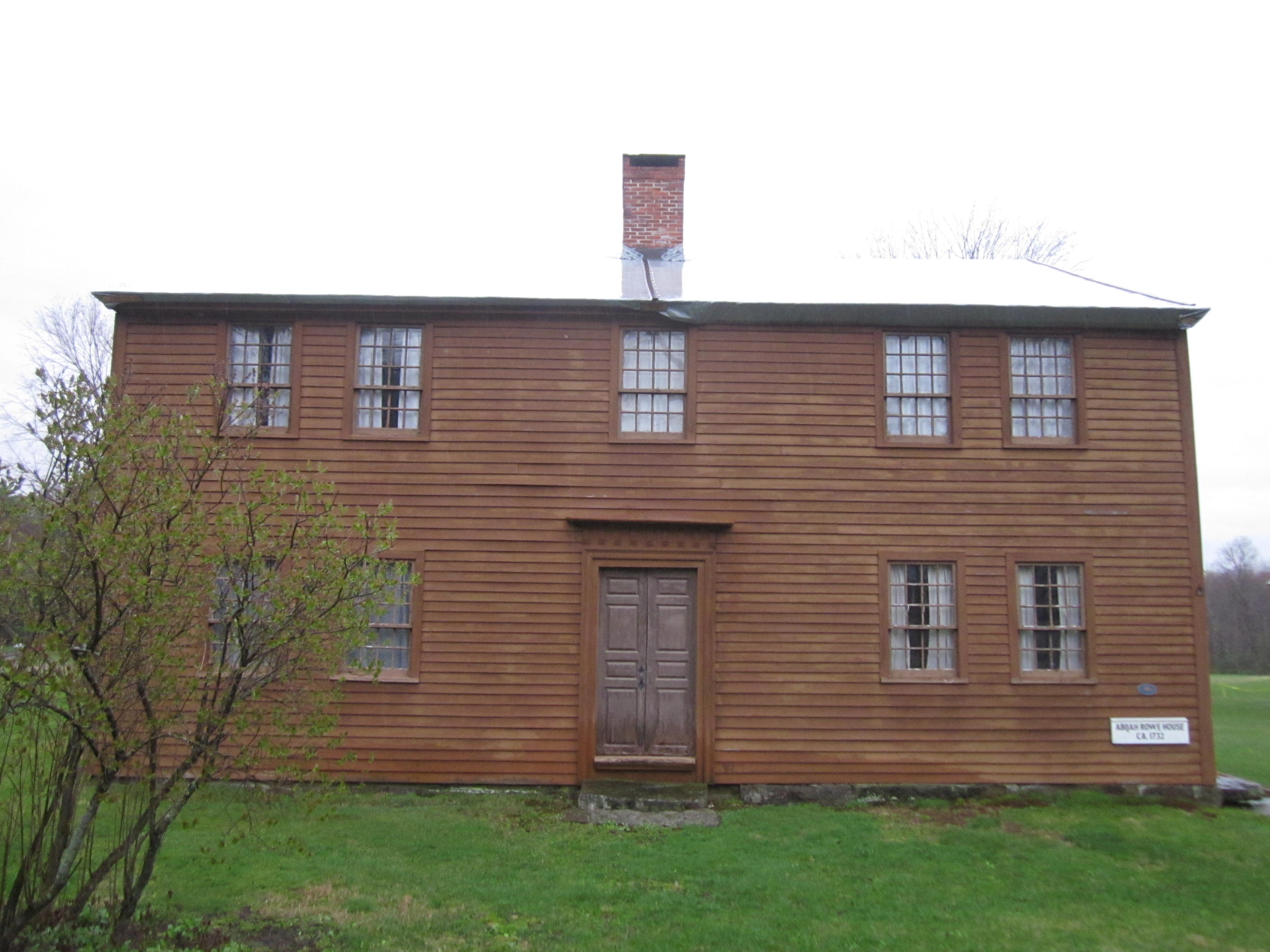
- The Rowe House

- Location within Connecticut Location within the United States
- Location: 208 Salmon Brook Street, Granby, Connecticut
- Coordinates: 41°56′45″N 72°47′27″W
- Area: less than one acre
- Built: 1732
- NRHP reference No.: 78002860
- Added to NRHP: January 18, 1978

The Salmon Brook Historical Society is the local historical society of Granby, Connecticut. The society's museum property is located and 208 Salmon Brook Street, and includes four historic buildings, which include museum displays of historic items, and a small research library. Two of the buildings, the Rowe and Weed Houses, are listed as a pair on the National Register of Historic Places.

== Abijah Rowe House ==
The Abijah Rowe House stands on the west side of the property, facing west toward Salmon Brook Street. It is a 2 1/2-story wood-frame structure, with a side-gable roof, central chimney, and clapboarded exterior. Its facade is five bays wide, with a center entrance framed by narrow moulding and a frieze with triglyphs topped by a shallow cornice. The interior retains many original period finishes, and has been decorated to have an early 1800s appearance. The house was built about 1732, probably by Nehemiah Lee, and is the oldest surviving building of the first colonial settlement of the area.

== Moses Weed House ==
The Moses Weed House stands behind the Rowe House, to which it is connected by a short hyphen; it faces north toward Meadow Gate Road. It is a single-story wood-frame structure, with a side-gable roof and central chimney. Its main facade is three bays wide, with a central entrance framed by simple trim. The interior includes a parlor finished in Victorian style, as well as the society's library and shop. The house was built in the uplands of Granby about 1790, and was moved here in 1970 to rescue it from demolition.

== Cooley School ==
The Cooley School is a single-story wood-frame structure with a gabled roof. Built about 1870, it is the only unaltered district schoolhouse remaining in Granby. It served as a school until 1972, and was moved by the society to its property in 1980. Its interior has been fitted as a late 19th-century classroom.

== Tobacco Barn ==
Also on the property stands a 1914 tobacco barn, which now houses a variety of exhibits on Granby's history and agrarian past.

== See also ==
- National Register of Historic Places listings in Hartford County, Connecticut
- List of historical societies in Connecticut

== See also ==
- Salmon Brook Historical Society web site
