= Bradley–Wheeler House =

Historic house in Connecticut, United States

- U.S. National Register of Historic Places
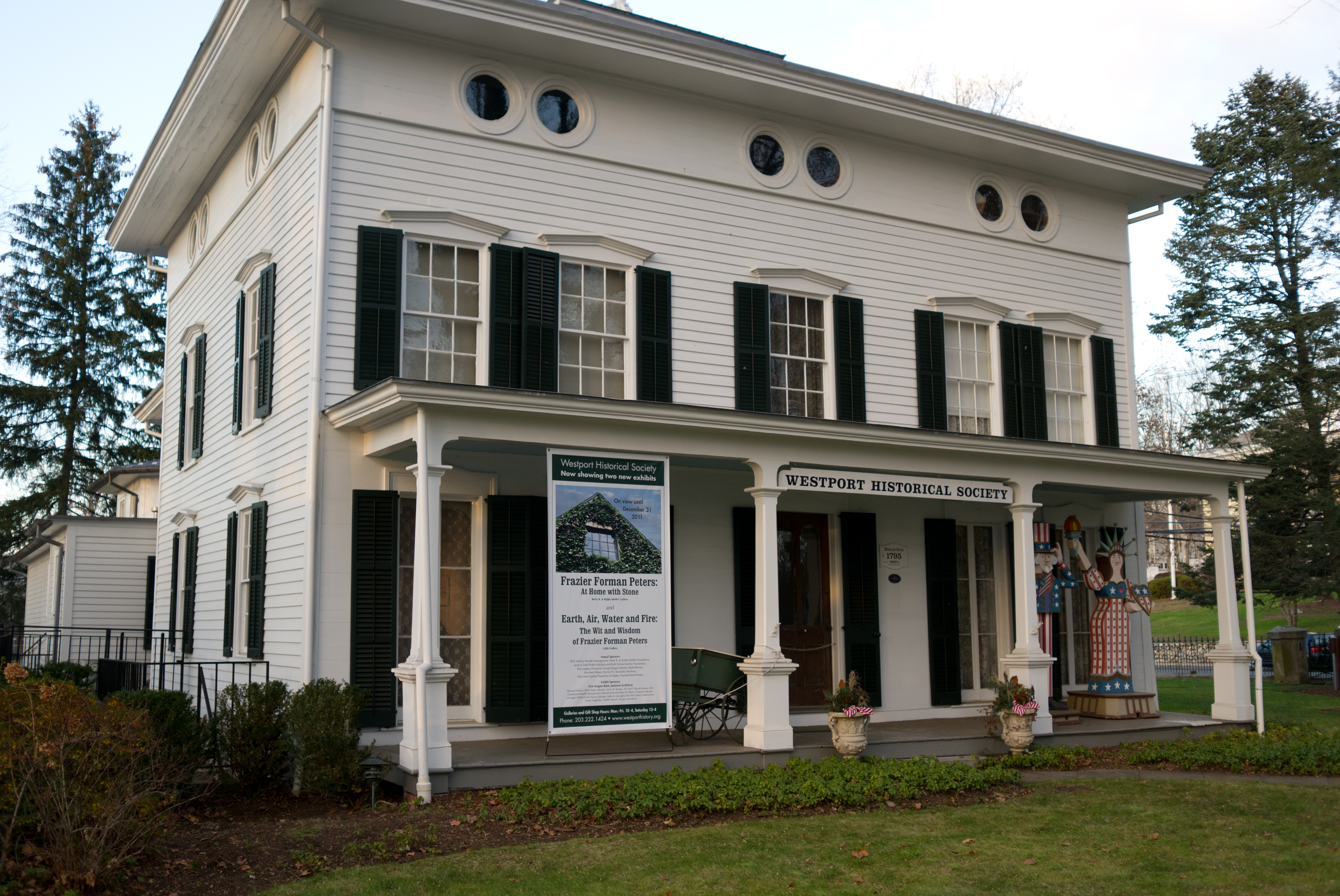
- Bradley–Wheeler House

- Location within Connecticut Location within the United States
- Location: 25 Avery Place, Westport, Connecticut
- Coordinates: 41°8′39″N 73°21′41″W
- Built: 1795
- Architectural style: Octagon Mode, Italianate
- NRHP reference No.: 84000791
- Added to NRHP: July 5, 1984

The Bradley–Wheeler House, also known as the Charles B. Wheeler House, is a historic house museum located at 25 Avery Place in Westport, Connecticut. Built ca. 1795 and restyled in the Italianate mode about 1867, it is one of the oldest surviving houses in Westport center. It was home to a procession of prominent local businessmen in the 19th century, and also includes a distinctive cobblestone barn that is the only known example of its type in the state. On July 5, 1984, it was added to the National Register of Historic Places.

== Description ==
The Bradley–Wheeler House stands just south of Westport's central Veteran's Green, on the north side of Avery Place. It is a 2 1/2-story wood-frame structure, with a clapboarded exterior and a shallow-pitch hip roof with a broad cupola at its center. Its main facade is five bays wide, with a single-story hip-roof porch across its width. Sash windows are topped by peaked cornices, and there are paired circular windows set in a frieze band in the attic level.

== Current use ==
The house is the headquarters of the Westport Museum for History and Culture (formerly the Westport Historical Society) and was operated as a Victorian-era historic house museum. On display were a furnished parlor room, dining room, bedroom and kitchen.

The Museum now displays changing exhibits of local history, art, and photography in its galleries.

The Bradley Wheeler Cobblestone Barn, located behind the house, is a heptagonal (seven-sided) barn with a conical octagonal roof. The barn is open seasonally and by appointment. Beginning in 2021, the barn underwent a restoration. According to the Museum's website, "the project included restoration of original windows, replacement lighting, floor and roof replacement, and interior climate conditioning to protect the building from climate-change provoked extremes of heat, cold and moisture that are very different from when the structure was originally built."

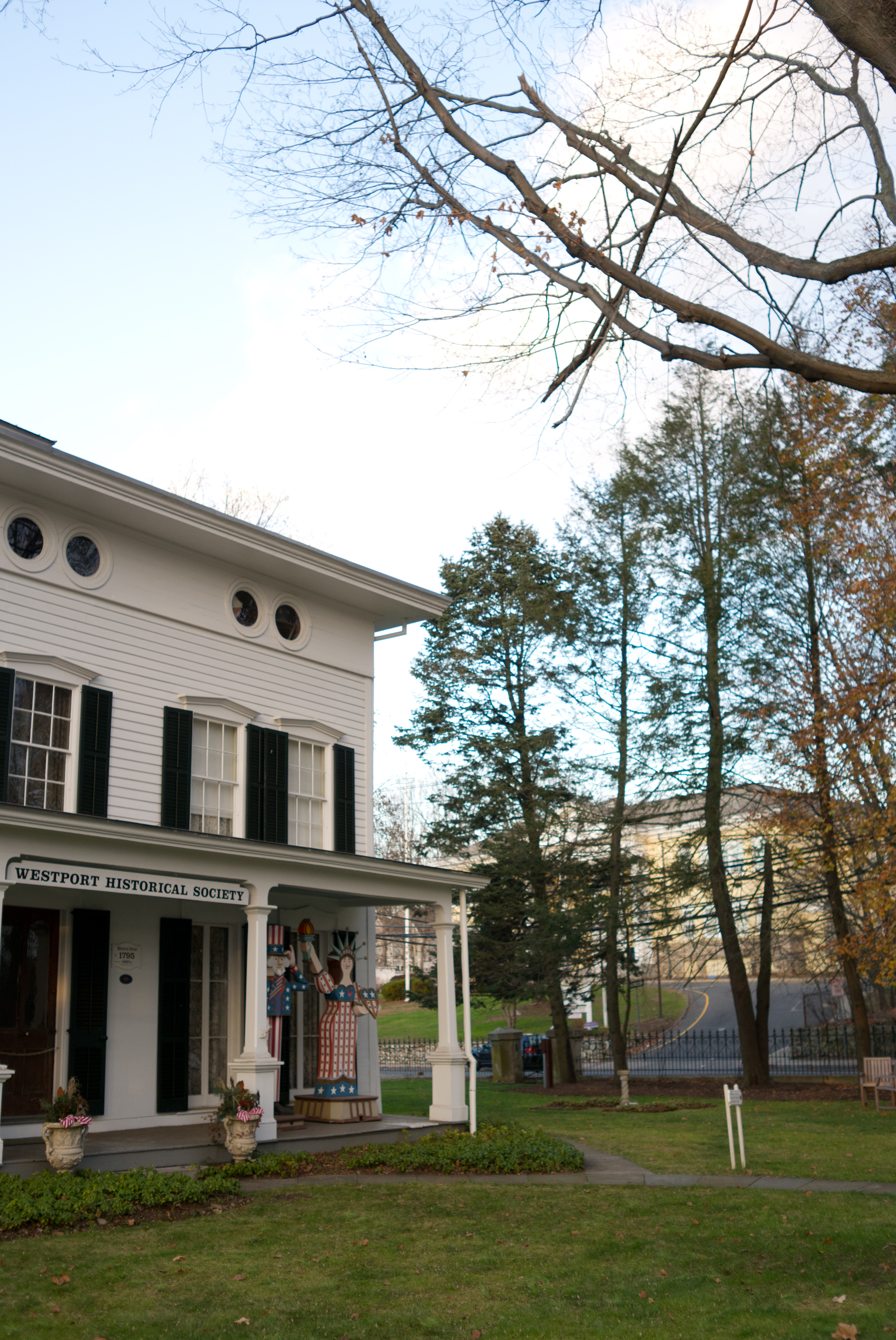

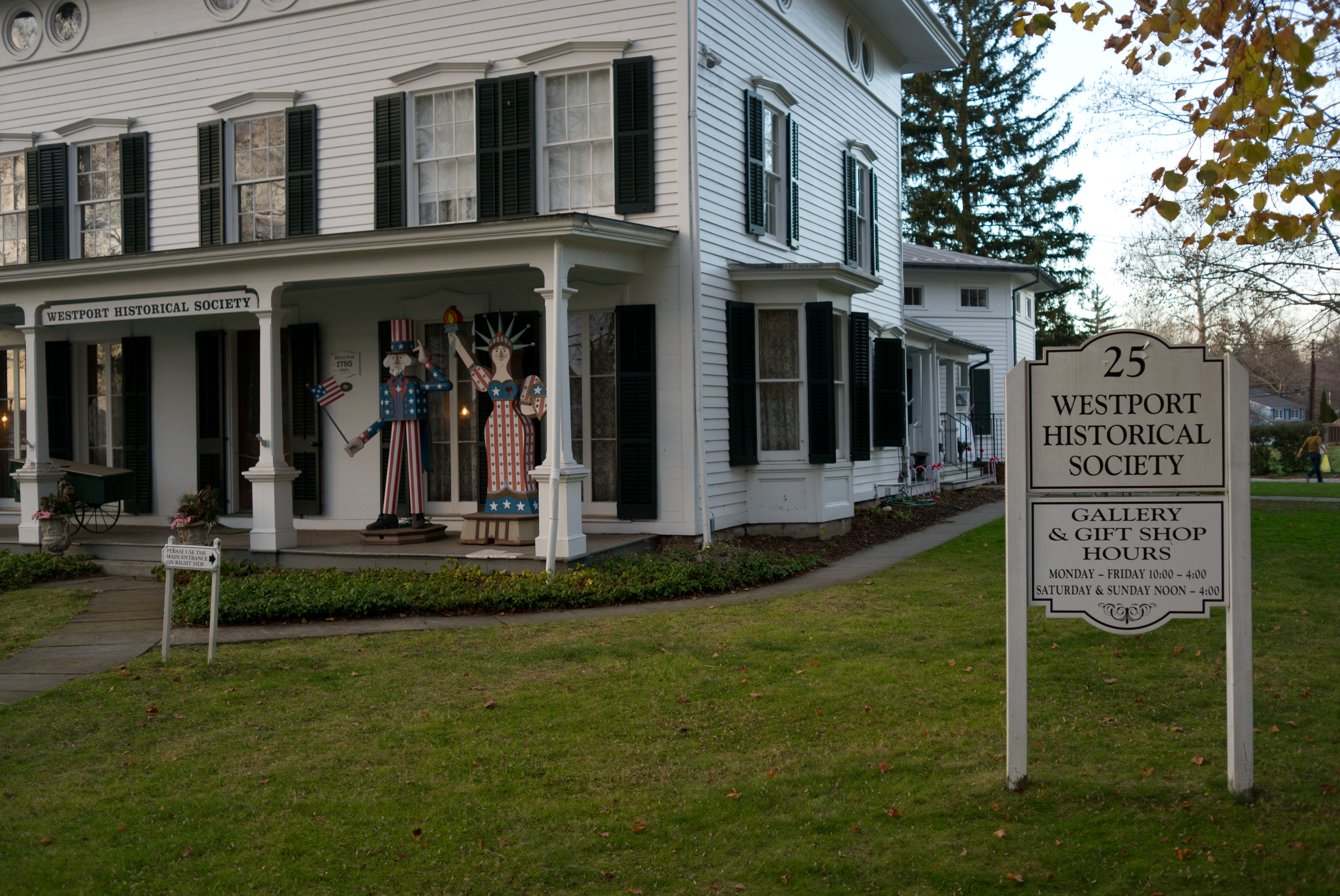

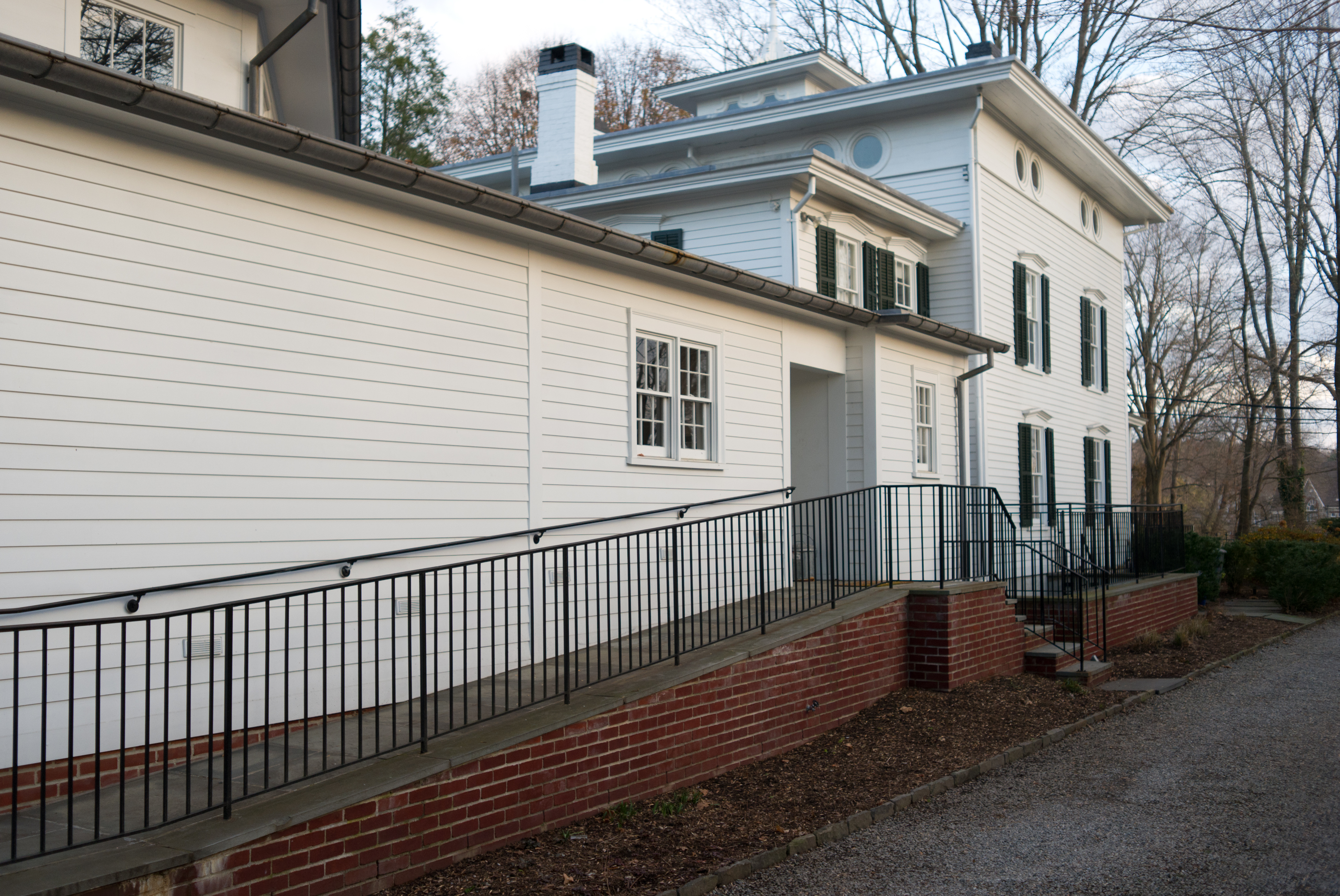

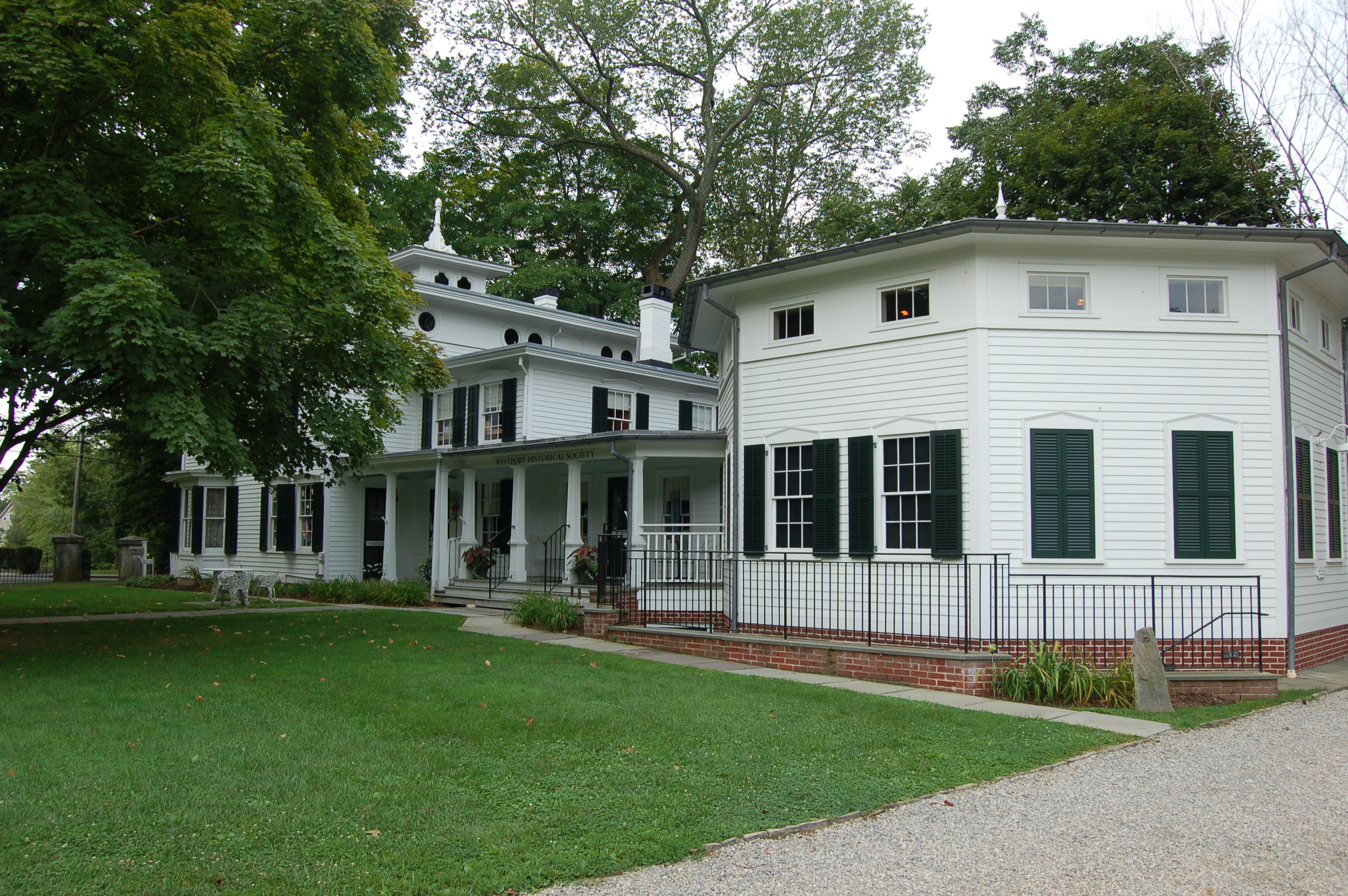

== See also ==
- National Register of Historic Places listings in Fairfield County, Connecticut
- List of historical societies in Connecticut
