= Watertown Historical Society =

Nonprofit in Watertown, Connecticut

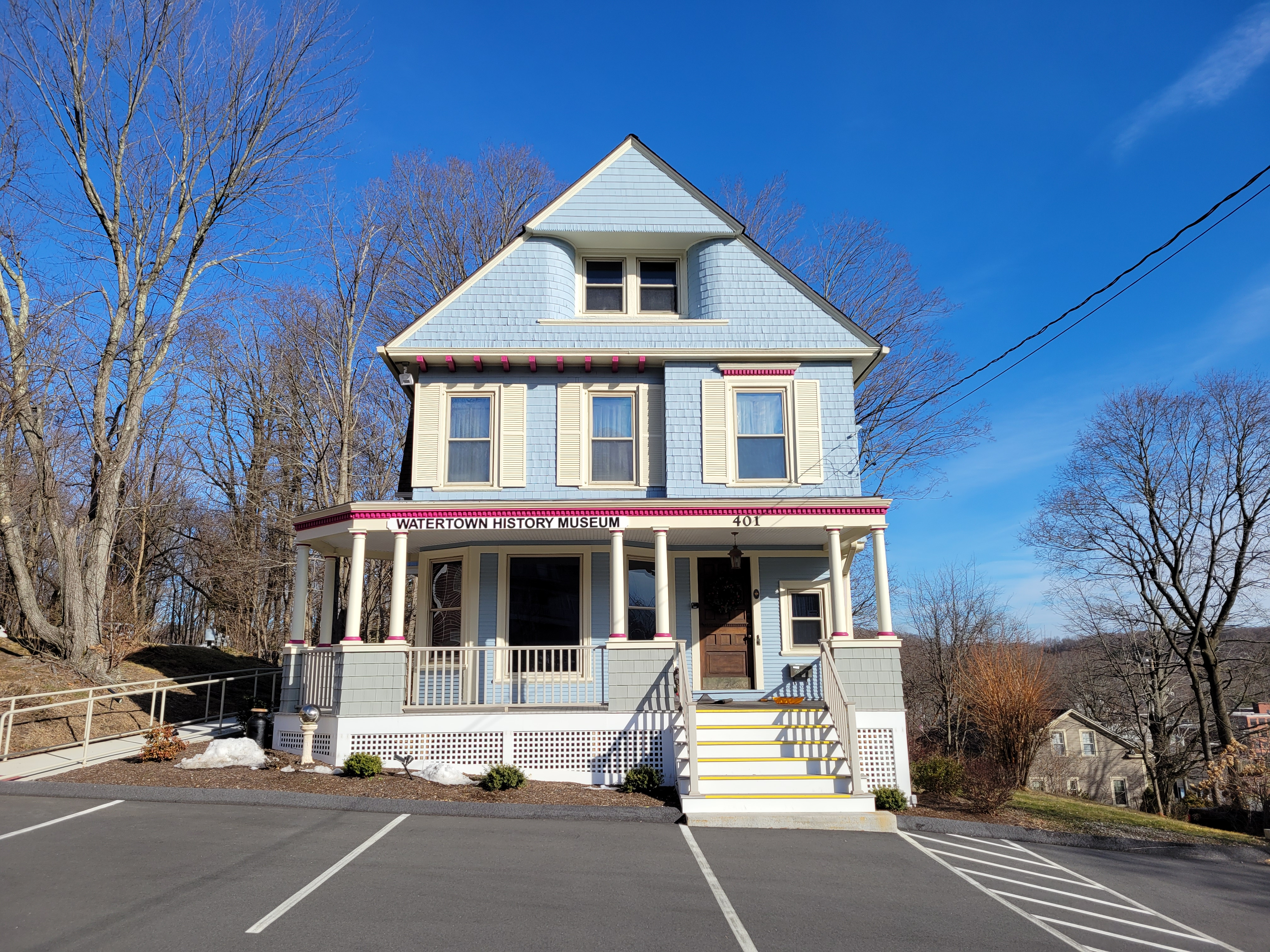
Watertown History Museum, Watertown Connecticut

The Watertown History Museum formerly known as the Watertown Historical Society is a nonprofit organization dedicated to preserving the social, commercial and cultural heritage of Watertown, Connecticut. Through its museum galleries, historic house tours, lecture series and archival collection, the society has traced and recorded the history of its region from the pre-Columbian period through the present day.

The museum is run by a team of volunteers and a Board of Directors. The museum has received local, state, and national honors for its work in bringing its historical collections into the 21st century.

== See also ==
- List of historical societies in Connecticut
