= Daniel and Esther Bartlett House =

Historic house in Connecticut, United States

- U.S. National Register of Historic Places
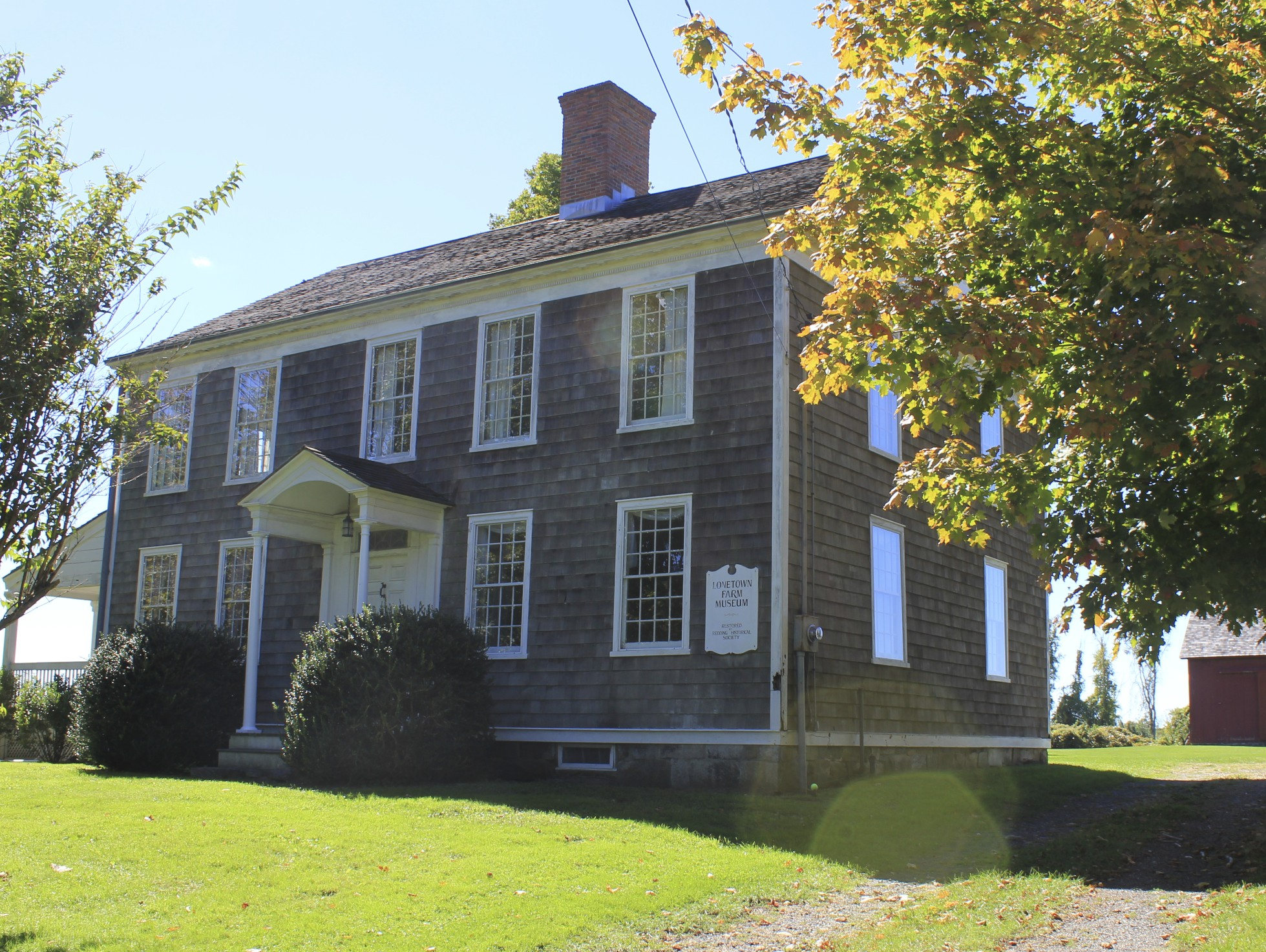

- Location within Connecticut Location within the United States
- Location: 43 Lonetown Road, Redding, Connecticut
- Coordinates: 41°18′40″N 73°23′9″W
- Area: 1.3 acres (0.53 ha)
- Built: 1796
- Architectural style: Federal
- NRHP reference No.: 93000290
- Added to NRHP: April 15, 1993

The Daniel and Esther Bartlett House is at historic house and farmstead at 43 Lonetown Road in Redding, Connecticut. Built in 1796, it is a good local example of well-preserved Federal architecture, somewhat unusual for its shingle siding. The property, now owned by the town and managed by Redding Historical Society, also includes an 18th-century barn. The property was listed on the National Register of Historic Places on April 15, 1993.

== Description and history ==
The Bartlett House is located in a rural-residential setting, northeast of the town center on the west side of Lonetown Road (Connecticut Route 107) just south of its junction with Gallows Hill Road Extension. It is a 2 1/2-story wood-frame structure, five bays wide, with a central chimney. The central entrance is framed by pilasters and topped by a transom window and pediment. The entry is sheltered by a gabled portico supported by Doric columns and pilasters. The interior follows a typical center chimney plan, with a narrow entry vestibule, parlors on either side, and the kitchen behind the chimney. Many original interior features remain, including wide floor boards, original doors (with original hardware), and wood paneling in the north parlor.

The house was built in 1796 for Daniel and Esther Bartlett, both members of locally prominent families. They only lived here until 1802, when they sold the property to the Sherwood family, who owned it for much of the 19th century. It remained in active use as a farm property until 1973, when the town acquired it and built the school just to the south. The house was then leased to the local historical society, which uses it as a headquarters and museum.

== See also ==
- National Register of Historic Places listings in Fairfield County, Connecticut
